= Cosmology Large Angular Scale Surveyor =

Microwave telescope array in Chile

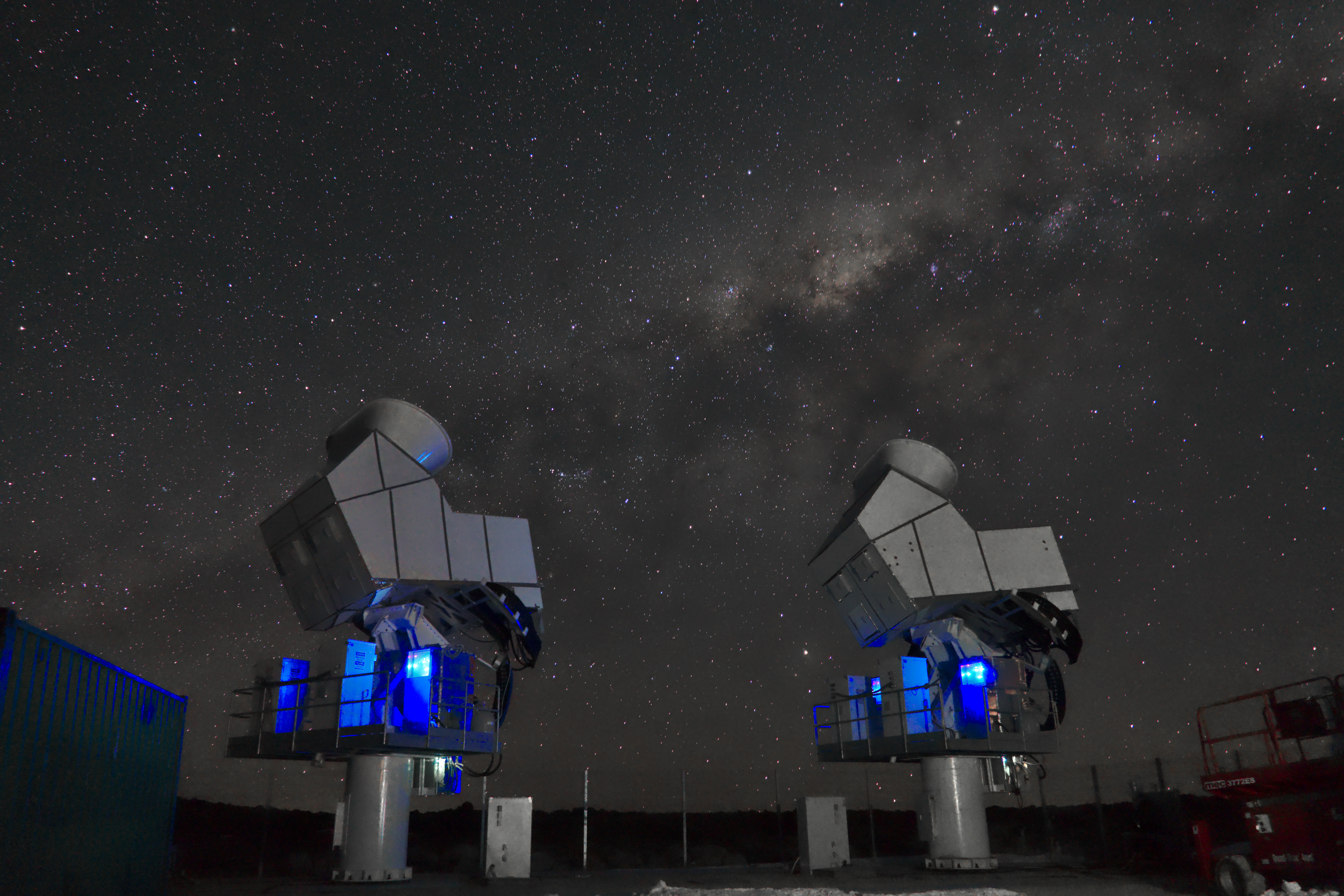
- CLASS telescopes at night
- Alternative names: CLASS
- Location: Atacama Desert
- Coordinates: 22°58′S 67°47′W
- Altitude: 5,140 m (16,860 ft)
- Wavelength: 1.4, 2.0, 3.3, 7.5 mm (214, 150, 91, 40 GHz)
- Telescope style: cosmic microwave background experiment radio telescope
- Website: sites.krieger.jhu.edu/class/
- Location within Chile
- Related media on Commons

The Cosmology Large Angular Scale Surveyor (CLASS) is an array of microwave telescopes which has been observing since 2016 from a high-altitude site in the Atacama Desert of Chile as part of the Parque Astronómico de Atacama. The CLASS experiment aims to improve our understanding of cosmic dawn when the first stars turned on and to test the theory of cosmic inflation by making precise measurements of the polarization of the Cosmic Microwave Background (CMB) over 65% of the sky at multiple frequencies in the microwave region of the electromagnetic spectrum.

To date, CLASS has produced maps of a majority of the sky at frequencies of 40 and 90 GHz (7.5 mm and 3.3 mm wavelength, respectively), constraints on circular polarization in the CMB, a detection of circular polarization from the atmosphere, and measurements of the disk-averaged microwave brightness temperature of Venus.

== Science goals ==
Overview of the CLASS site in 2019.

CLASS is addressing two primary science goals. The first is to improve our understanding of "cosmic dawn," when the first stars lit up the universe. Ultraviolet (UV) radiation from these stars stripped electrons from atoms in a process called reionization. The freed electrons scatter CMB light, imparting a polarization that CLASS measures. Constraints on reionization from the CMB are critical in reconciling astronomers' understanding of reionization with results from the James Webb Space Telescope that indicate that galaxies may have formed earlier than previously thought. In this way CLASS can improve our knowledge of when and how cosmic dawn occurred. A better understanding of cosmic dawn will also help other experiments measure the sum of the masses of the three known neutrino types using the gravitational lensing of the CMB.

A second science goal of CLASS is to test the theory of inflation. In physical cosmology, cosmic inflation is the leading theory of the very early universe; however, observational evidence for inflation is still inconclusive. Inflationary models generically predict that a gravitational-wave background (GWB) would have been produced along with the density perturbations that seed large-scale structure. Such an inflationary GWB would leave an imprint on both the temperature and polarization of the CMB. In particular it would leave a distinctive and unique pattern of polarization, called a B-mode pattern, in the CMB polarization. A measurement of B-mode polarization in the CMB would be important confirmation of inflation and would provide a rare glimpse into physics at ultra-high energies.

CLASS is also furthering our understand of our own Milky Way Galaxy and searching for evidence of exotic new physics through constraining circular polarization in the CMB and large-scale anomalies. (See the Low multipoles and other anomalies section of the cosmic microwave background article for more information on the latter.)

== Instrument ==
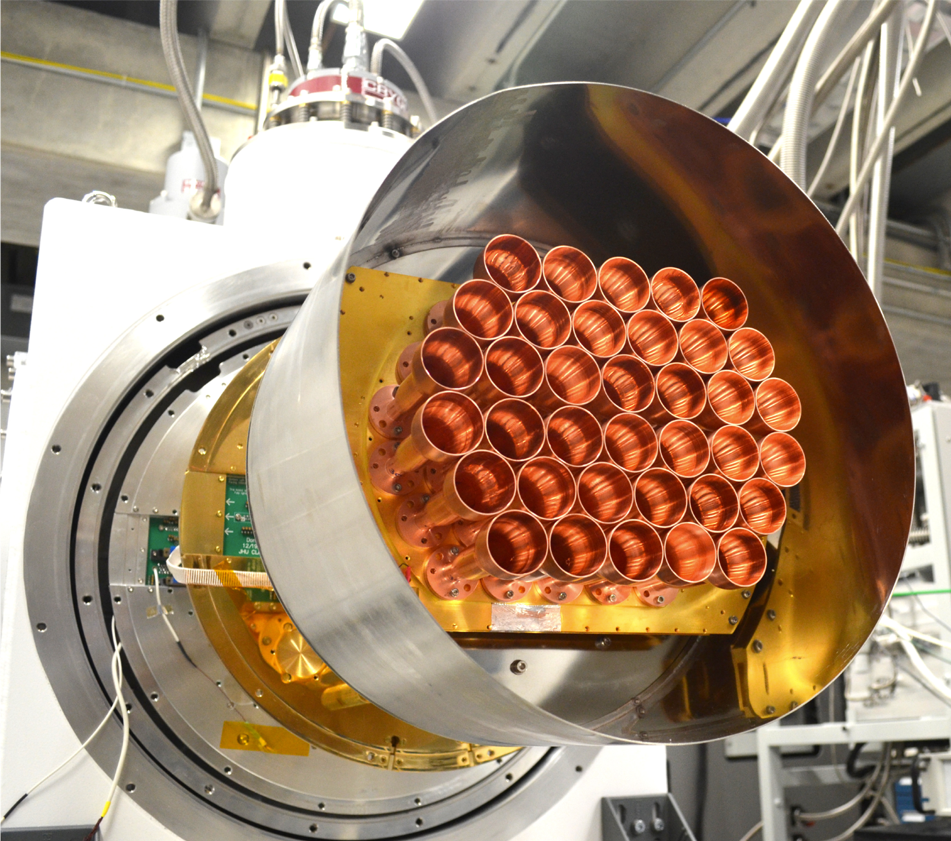
CLASS 40 GHz camera, showing the feedhorns that couple light onto the transition-edge sensor bolometers at a temperature of 0.1 Kelvin.

The CLASS instrument is designed to survey 65% of the sky at millimeter wavelengths, in the microwave portion of the electromagnetic spectrum, from a ground-based observatory with a resolution of about 1° — approximately twice the angular size of the sun and moon as viewed from Earth. The CLASS array consists of two altazimuth mounts that allow the telescopes to be pointed to observe different patches of sky. The four CLASS telescopes observe at a range of frequencies to separate emission from our galaxy from that of the CMB. One telescope observes at 40 GHz (7.5 mm wavelength); one telescope observes at 90 GHz (3.3 mm wavelength) with a second 90 GHz telescope planned in the future; and the fourth telescope observes in two frequency bands centered at 150 GHz (2 mm wavelength) and 220 GHz (1.4 mm wavelength). Two separate telescopes, observing at different frequencies, are housed on each mount. The 90 GHz telescope detector array was upgraded in 2022 to significantly increase sensitivity. In 2024 the variable-delay polarization modulator (VPM, see below for more details) for the CLASS 90 GHz telescope was replaced with a rotating reflective half-wave plate (HWP) to concentrate on improved sensitivity for linear polarization.

The CLASS instrument is specifically designed to measure polarization. As an electromagnetic wave, light consists of oscillating electric and magnetic fields. These fields can have both an amplitude, or intensity, and a preferred direction in which they oscillate, or polarization. The polarized signal that CLASS will attempt to measure is incredibly small. It is expected to be only a few parts-per-billion change in the polarization of the already-cold 2.725 K CMB. To measure such a small signal, CLASS employs focal plane arrays with large numbers of feedhorn-coupled, transition-edge-sensor bolometers cooled to just 0.1 °C above absolute zero by cryogenic helium refrigerators. This low temperature reduces the intrinsic thermal noise of the detectors.

The other unique aspect of the CLASS telescopes is the use of a VPM to allow a precise and stable measurement of polarization. The VPM modulates, or turns on and off, the polarized light going to the detector at a known frequency, approximately 10 Hz, while leaving unpolarized light unchanged. This allows for a clear separation of the tiny polarization of the CMB from the much larger unpolarized atmosphere by "locking in" to the 10 Hz signal. The VPM also modulates circular polarization out of phase with linear polarization, giving CLASS sensitivity to circular polarization. There are many potential scenarios that could generate circular polarization in the early universe, and CLASS has now put very strong limits on these theories.

Because water vapor in the atmosphere emits at microwave frequencies, CLASS observes from a very dry and high-altitude site in the Andes Mountains on the edge of the Atacama Desert of Chile. Nearby sites have been chosen by other observatories for the same reason, including ACT, APEX, ALMA, ASTE, CBI, CCAT-prime, NANTEN2, POLARBEAR, Simons Observatory, and TAO.

== Current status and results ==
Maps of linearly-polarized Stokes parameters Q and U, as well as circularly-polarized Stokes parameter V from the CLASS 40 GHz survey. The plane of the Milky Way Galaxy is horizontal in this projection.

CLASS is currently observing the sky in four frequency bands. The CLASS 40 GHz telescope achieved first light on 8 May 2016 and began a roughly five-year survey in September 2016 after initial commissioning observations were complete. In early 2018, a first 90 GHz telescope was installed on the same mount as the 40 GHz telescope, achieving first light on 30 May 2018. In 2019, the dual-frequency 150/220 GHz telescope was deployed, along with a second telescope mount, and achieved first light on 21 September 2019.

CLASS has released results from the first five years of observations with the 40 GHz telescope, through mid-2022, and from observations with the 90 GHz telescope through 2024. CLASS has made the most sensitive maps covering approximately 74% of the sky at 40 GHz at angular scales of approximately 2° to 20°. These maps have been combined with those of the Wilkinson Microwave Anisotropy Probe (WMAP) satellite at a similar frequency to produce even more sensitive combined maps. CLASS maps at 90 GHz are comparable in sensitivity to those of the Planck Satellite at similar frequencies and have been used to place constraints on reionization, a first for a ground-based telescope.

CLASS has made a first detection of circular polarization from the atmosphere at a frequency of 40 GHz, which is in agreement with models of atmospheric circular polarization due to Zeeman splitting of molecular oxygen in the presence of the Earth's magnetic field. The atmospheric circular polarization is smoothly-varying over the sky, allowing it to be separated from celestial circular polarization. This has allowed CLASS to constrain celestial circular polarization at 40 GHz to be less than 0.1 μK at angular scales of 5 degrees and less than 1 μK at angular scales around 1 degree. This is an improvement upon previous limits on circular polarization in the CMB by more than a factor of 100.

CLASS has also placed unique constraints on the disk-averaged microwave temperature of Venus, which is sensitive to the composition of the Venusian atmosphere.

== See also ==
- Llano de Chajnantor Observatory
- BICEP and Keck Array
- List of cosmic microwave background experiments
