= Atacama B-Mode Search =

Astronomical experiment

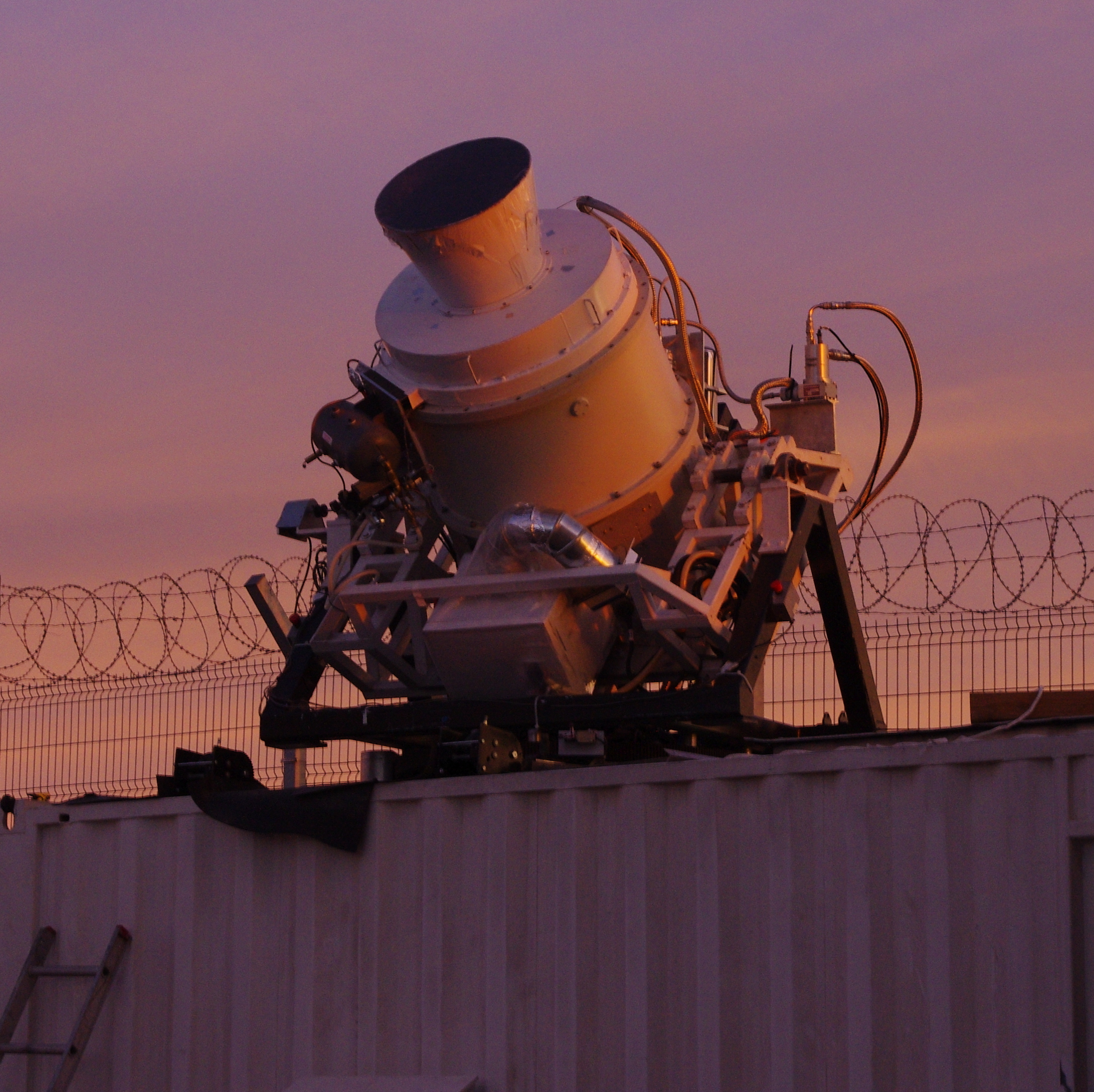
- The Atacama B-Mode Search on top of its shipping container.
- Location(s): Atacama Desert
- Coordinates: 22°58′S 67°47′W
- Altitude: 5,200 m (17,100 ft)
- Wavelength: 2 mm (150 GHz)
- Website: www.princeton.edu/physics/research/cosmology-experiment/abs-experiment/
- Location of Atacama B-Mode Search
- Related media on Commons

The Atacama B-Mode Search (ABS) was an experiment to test the theory of cosmic inflation and distinguish between inflationary models of the very early universe by making precise measurements of the polarization of the Cosmic Microwave Background (CMB). ABS was located at a high-altitude site in the Atacama Desert of Chile as part of the Parque Astronómico de Atacama. ABS began observations in February 2012 and completed observations in October 2014.

== Instrument ==
The ABS telescope imaged the sky at a frequency of 145 GHz (2 mm wavelength), in the microwave region of the electromagnetic spectrum, where the CMB emission is at its maximum. The CMB is expected to be weakly polarized, and the ABS instrument is designed to measure this very faint signal. The camera consisted of 240 polarization-sensitive pixels, with two transition-edge-sensor (TES) bolometers per pixel. This TES array was cooled to a temperature of 0.3 Kelvin to reduce thermal noise in the detectors. The optics consisted of two 60 cm mirrors that were kept at a temperature of 4 K.

At the frequencies relevant for measuring the CMB, emission from water vapor in the atmosphere can be a strong contaminant. The high altitude of the site (5200 m above sea level) and its very dry climate resulted in less signal contamination from the atmosphere than would be obtained from most other sites on Earth. Nearby sites have been chosen by other observatories for the same reason, including ACT, ALMA, APEX, ASTE, CBI, Nanten, and POLARBEAR/Simons Array.

The ABS experiment was designed for rapid deployment by being built in North America into a standard shipping container. Upon arrival in Chile, the telescope was raised out of a special hatch in the roof of the shipping container for observations. Compared to other similar experiments, ABS was unique in using an ambient-temperature half-wave plate to quickly modulate incoming polarization. This allowed the instrument to "lock in" to the polarized signal of interest and reject the atmosphere, which is largely unpolarized.

== Science goals ==
The observations made by ABS tested the theory of inflation. Inflation is the leading theory of the very early universe; however, observational evidence for inflation is still inconclusive. Inflationary models generically predict that a gravitational-wave background (GWB) would have been produced along with the density perturbations that seed large-scale structure formation. Such a GWB would leave an imprint on both the temperature and polarization of the CMB. In particular it would leave a unique pattern of polarization, called a B-mode pattern, in the CMB polarization. A measurement of B-mode polarization in the CMB would be important confirmation of inflation and would provide a rare glimpse into physics at ultra-high energies.

== Results ==
Based on an analysis of data from a 2400 deg^{2} primary observing patch (roughly 6% of the full sky), the ABS experiment measured the expected polarization of the CMB from density perturbations in the early universe, but found no evidence for a GWB from inflation. The ABS experiment also demonstrated the ability to use a half-wave plate as a fast, front-end polarization modulator for measurement stability and control of systematic errors.

The ABS project was supported by funding from the NSF, NASA, and CONICYT. Major collaborating institutions included Princeton University, the Johns Hopkins University, NIST, and the Universidad de Chile.

== See also ==
- Atacama Cosmology Telescope
- POLARBEAR
- List of radio telescopes
- Llano de Chajnantor Observatory
