= Astronomy in Chile =

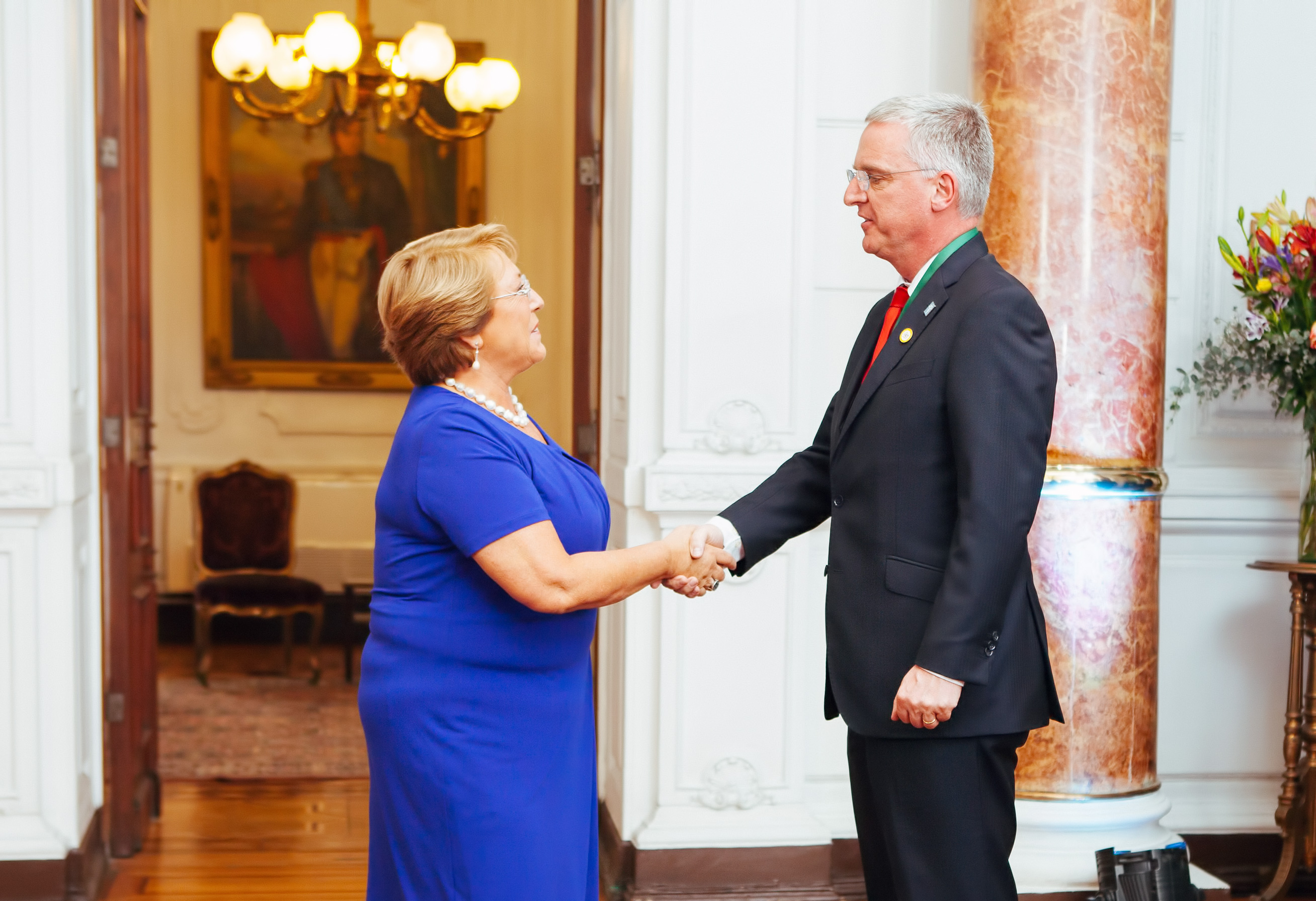
The President of Chile Michelle Bachelet meets senior ESO Director General Tim de Zeeuw.

In 2011, Chile was home to 42% of the world's astronomical infrastructure, consisting principally of telescopes. In 2015, it was estimated that Chile would contain more than 50% of the global astronomical infrastructure by 2030. In the Atacama Desert region of northern Chile, the skies are exceptionally clear and dry for more than 300 days of the year. These conditions have attracted the world's scientific community to develop highly ambitious astronomical projects in the Atacama Desert.

Chile's diverse and active astronomical community includes Chilean and international professionals, including astronomers, engineers, students, and teachers, as well as amateurs.

The first documented report of an astronomical measurement carried out in Chile was the observation of a lunar eclipse by the soldier Pedro Cuadrado Chavino in June 1582. He used a classic Greek method to establish the latitude of the city of Valdivia based on measurements during the eclipse. Three centuries thereafter, in 1849 under the government of Manuel Bulnes, a scientific mission organized by the U.S. Navy that was led by James Melville Gilliss arrived in Chile to observe Venus and Mars to determine the distance between the Earth and the Sun. Gilliss' mission established the first astronomical observatory in the Cerro Santa Lucia (Santiago). Three years thereafter, in 1852, the facilities comprising that observatory were transferred to Chile and the National Astronomical Observatory was born. During the second half of the 20th century, observatories owned and operated by organizations in the U.S. and Europe were constructed in various locations in the north of the country: La Silla, Cerro Tololo, Las Campanas and later Cerro Paranal, Cerro Pachon and Chajnantor.

== Chilean Astronomical Institutions ==
=== Professional astronomy ===
- Center for Excellence in Astrophysics and Associated Technologies, CATA - Spanish & English

CATA is the largest Chilean R&D facility that exists for the development of technologies useful for astronomy. It is located in Calán Hill (Cerro Calán), in Santiago, Chile. This center has the largest number of astronomers in Chile, who hail from three universities: Universidad de Chile, Pontificia Universidad Católica de Chile and Universidad de Concepción. CATA is engaged in work on nine different areas: six are focused on scientific research, three are focused on technological advances, and one is focused on Education & Outreach (to students, teachers, and the general public).

- Millennium Center for Supernova Science - Spanish & English

This center, which is mainly dedicated to supernova research, brings together astronomers from the Universidad de Chile, Pontificia Universidad Católica de Chile and Universidad Andrés Bello.

- Center of Astrophysics FONDAP - Spanish
- Centre of Astrophysics Valparaiso
- Chilean Astronomical Society (SOCHIAS) (in Spanish)

==== Northern Chile ====
- Astronomy Center, University of Antofagasta
- Astronomy Group, University of La Serena
- Program in Physics with a division in Astronomy, Catholic University of the North

==== Central Chile ====
- Astronomy Department, Universidad de Chile (Spanish & English)
- Department of Astronomy and Astrophysics, Universidad Católica de Chile (English & Spanish)
- Department of Physics and Astronomy, University of Valparaíso
- Departamento de Astronomía Universidad Andrés Bello. (Spanish)
- Group of Earth and Space Science, University of Santiago. (in Spanish)

==== Southern Chile ====
- Astronomy Department, Universidad de Concepción. (Spanish and English)

=== Amateur astronomy ===
- Cerro Los Condores Observatory (Atacama Region)
- Cerro Mayu Observatory (Coquimbo Region)
- Cerro Mamalluca Observatory (Coquimbo Region)
- Cerro Collowara Observatory (Coquimbo Region)
- Astronomical Society of Valparaiso and Viña (SAVAL) (Valparaiso Region)
- Department of Astronomy (RASTRO), University of Concepcion (Bio-Bio Region)
- Chilean Association of Astronomy and Astronautics (ACHAYA) (Metropolitan Region)
- Metropolitan Amateur Astronomical Society (Metropolitan Region)

== International astronomy institutions in Chile ==
- Carnegie Observatories
- European Southern Observatory (ESO)
- National Optical Astronomical Observatories [NOAO], USA)
- National Radio Astronomy Observatory (NRAO, USA)

== Observatories ==
=== Existing facilities ===
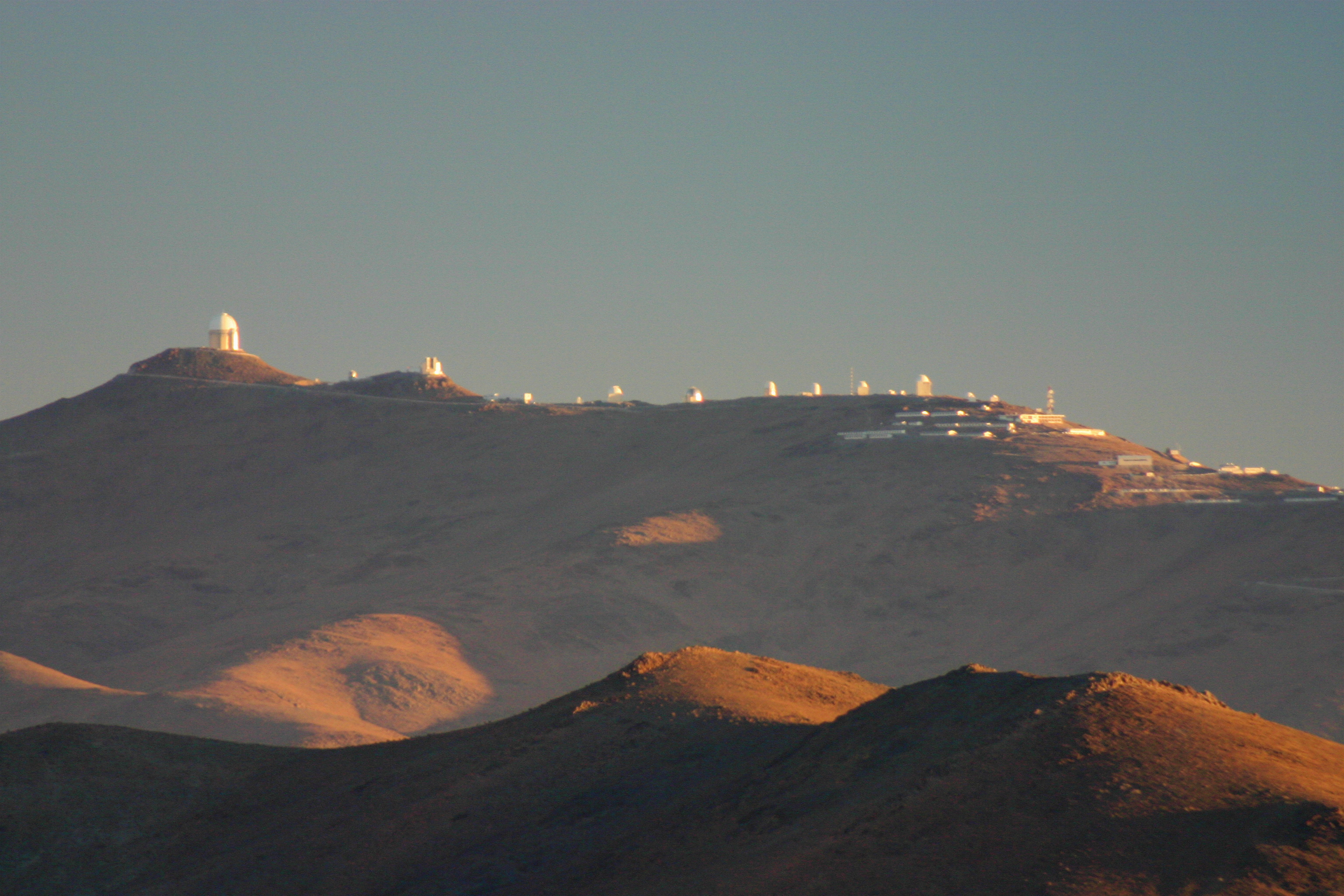
Picture of La Silla Observatory taken from Las Campanas Observatory

- National Astronomical Observatory (Chile)
- Cerro Tololo Inter-American Observatory: NOAO telescopes, SMART consortium, GONG, PROMPT, ALPACA.
- Cerro Pachon Observatory: Gemini Observatory, SOAR Telescope.
- Llano de Chajnantor Observatory: Cosmic Background Imager (CBI), Atacama Pathfinder Experiment (APEX), Q/U Imaging ExperimenT QUIET,
- Pampa La Bola and Purico Complex: Atacama Submillimeter Telescope Experiment (ASTE), NANTEN2 Observatory
- Paranal Observatory: Very Large Telescope (VLT), Visible & Infrared Survey Telescope for Astronomy (VISTA Telescope).
- Atacama Large Millimeter Array
- La Silla Observatory: ESO telescopes
- Las Campanas Observatory: Carnegie telescopes, Magellan telescopes, Birmingham Solar Oscillations Network
- Cerro El Roble Observatory
- Manuel Foster Observatory
- TIGO (Transportable Integrated Geodetic Observatory)

=== Future facilities ===
- Giant Magellan Telescope (GMT) to be located at Las Campanas Observatory.
- European Extremely Large Telescope (ELT) to be located in Cerro Armazones.
- Vera C. Rubin Observatory to be located in Cerro Pachón Observatory (El Peñón).
- Overwhelmingly Large Telescope (planned but not yet initiated). Potential sites in Chile were located in the Antofagasta region.

Further information on the Extremely large telescope.

== Light pollution ==
- Light Pollution Office (OPCC): depends on the Comision Nacional de Medio Ambiente (CONAMA) and the international observatories.
- IDA-Chile: National section of the International Dark-Sky Association (IDA).

== Education ==
=== Undergraduate programs ===
- Astronomy Bachelor's Degree (Pontificia Universidad Católica de Chile)
- Astronomy Bachelor's Degree (Universidad de Chile)
- Astronomy Bachelor's Degree (Universidad de Concepción)
- Bachelor's Degree in Physics, concentration in Astronomy (Universidad de Valparaíso)
- Bachelor's Degree in Physics with concentration in Astronomy (Universidad Andrés Bello)
- Bachelor's Degree in Physics, concentration in Astronomy (Universidad de la Serena)
- Bachelor's Degree in Physics, concentration in Astronomy (Universidad Católica del Norte)

=== Graduate programs ===
- Master's Degree in Astronomy (Universidad de Antofagasta)
- Master's Degree in Astronomy (Universidad de Chile)
- Ph.D. in Astronomy (Universidad de Chile)
- Master's Degree in Astronomy (Pontificia Universidad Católica de Chile)
- Ph.D. in astronomy (Pontificia Universidad Católica de Chile)
- Master's Degree in Astronomy (Universidad de La Serena)
- Master's Degree in Astronomy (Universidad de Concepción)
- Ph.D. in astronomy (Universidad de Concepción)
- Ph.D. in Astrophysics (Universidad Andrés Bello)

=== School programs ===
- CADIAS
- Education and Outreach. Astronomy Department, University of Concepción.

== People ==
=== Professional astronomers ===
==== In Chile ====
There are more than 100 astronomers resident in Chile. These include:

- Alejandro Clocchiatti (Pontificia Universidad Católica de Chile) Main Research Areas: Supernova and High-Performance Computing, member of the "High-Z Supernova Search Team". For this work, the PI of the team, Brian P. Schmidt, was awarded the Physics Nobel Prize in 2011 for the discovery of the accelerated expansion of the Universe.
- Mario Hamuy (Universidad de Chile). Main Research Areas: Supernovae, Distance Scale, Observational Cosmology. Main Awards: Guggenheim Scholarship (2011). Hamuy is the second most cited scientist in Chile, and the most cited Chilean astronomer according to the SAO/NASA Astrophysics Data System (tabulated until June 2011)
- Dante Minniti (Pontificia Universidad Católica de Chile) Main Research Area: Birth & Evolution of Structures in the Universe
- José Maza (Universidad de Chile). Main Research Area: Supernovae. Main Award: National Prize for Exact Sciences (1999)
- Leopoldo Infante, (Pontificia Universidad Católica de Chile) Main Research Areas: Birth & Evolution of Structures in the Universe, Star Populations.
- María Teresa Ruiz (Universidad de Chile): Main Research Area: Brown Dwarfs. Main Award: National Prize for Exact Sciences (1997)
- Guido Garay (Universidad de Chile) Main Research Area: Star Formation
- Luis Barrera, (UMCE)
- Leonardo Bronfman, (Universidad de Chile) Main Research Areas: Molecular Clouds, Star Formation & Galactic Structure, Astronomical Instrumentation
- Douglas Geisler (Universidad de Concepción)
- Wolfgang Gieren (Universidad de Concepción)
- Ronald Mennickent (Universidad de Concepción)
- Teresa Paneque
- Marcelo Mora, (Pontificia Universidad Católica de Chile)
- Ramirez, Amelia (U. La Serena): dynamics and evolution of galaxies, galaxy groups, and clusters.
- Munoz Ferrada, Carlos

=== Engineers ===
- Seguel, Juan (CTIO): site testing of potential observatory locations.

=== Amateur astronomers and teachers ===
- Gomez, Arturo: discoverer of the Gomez's Hamburger, a protoplanetary disk surrounding a young low-mass star.
- Jimenez, Carmen Gloria: teacher and psychologist working as Educational and Outreach Expert for the Astronomy Department of the Universidad de Concepción. She is widely known for her participation in NASA's program "Teachers in Space" with an opportunity to visit the International Space Station or participate in the ground-based support for space missions engaging teachers.
- Picetti, Battista: physics and astronomy teacher in the Seminario Conciliar de La Serena. He won the Michael Faraday Award for the Best Physics Teacher in 2007. Father Picetti is also the creator of El Tololito (La Serena) and Cerro Mayu Observatories

=== Planetariums ===
- Planetarium of the Universidad de Santiago (Santiago)
- Gemini's Mobile Planetariums (La Serena)
- The Rapanui Planetarium is located in Hanga Roa, Rapa Nui (a.k.a. Easter Island). The Planetarium has agreements with the Department of Astronomy of the University of Concepción as well as with the University of Valparaíso. It offers free weekly activities for an average of 305 local schoolchildren from the following institutions: Liceo Lorenzo Baeza Vega, Hona'a o te Mana Aldea Educativa Rapa Nui, Colegio San Sebastián de Akivi, and Colegio Católico Hermano Eugenio Eyraud de Rapa Nui. This is a private venture founded by the archaeoastronomers Edmundo Edwards and Barthelemy d'Ans to promote Rapanui and Polynesian ethnoastronomy in addition to traditional astronomy.

=== Publications and books ===
- Supernovas, José Maza, Mario Hamuy.
- Hijos de las estrellas, Maria Ruiz. ISBN 978-956-304-037-1
- Astronomía Contemporánea, José Maza
- Mundos lejanos, Dante Minniti.
- El mundo de Carlota, Teresa Paneque.
- Con ojos de gigantes: la observación astronómica en el siglo XXI, L. Felipe Barrientos y Sebastian Lopez, Ediciones B. 2008
