= List of cosmic microwave background experiments =

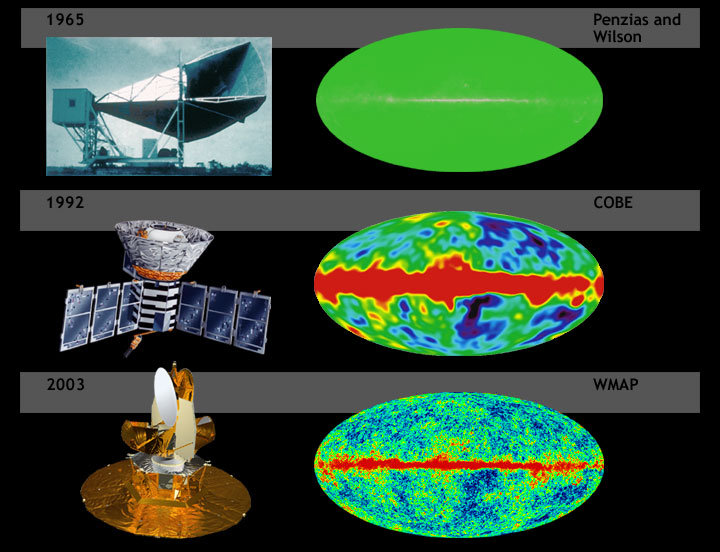
A comparison of the sensitivity and resolution of WMAP with COBE and Penzias and Wilson's telescope, simulated data

This list is a compilation of experiments measuring the cosmic microwave background (CMB) radiation anisotropies and polarization since the first detection of the CMB by Penzias and Wilson in 1964. There have been a variety of experiments to measure the CMB anisotropies and polarization since its first observation in 1964 by Penzias and Wilson. These include a mix of ground-, balloon- and space-based receivers. Some notable experiments in the list are COBE, which first detected the temperature anisotropies of the CMB, and showed that it had a black body spectrum; DASI, which first detected the polarization signal from the CMB; CBI, which made high-resolution observations and obtained the first E-mode polarization spectrum; WMAP; and the Planck spacecraft, which has produced the highest resolution all-sky map to-date of both the temperature anisotropies and polarization signals. Current scientific goals for CMB observation include precise measurement of gravitational lensing, which can constrain the mass of the neutrino; and measurement of B-mode polarization as possible evidence for cosmic inflation.

The design of cosmic microwave background experiments is a very challenging task. The greatest problems are the receivers, the telescope optics and the atmosphere. Many improved microwave amplifier technologies have been designed for microwave background applications. Some technologies used are HEMT, MMIC, SIS and bolometers. Experiments generally use elaborate cryogenic systems to keep the amplifiers cool. Often, experiments are interferometers which only measure the spatial fluctuations in signals on the sky, and are insensitive to the average 2.7 K background.

Another problem is the 1/f noise intrinsic to all detectors. Usually the experimental scan strategy is designed to minimize the effect of such noise. To minimize side lobes, microwave optics usually utilize elaborate lenses and feed horns. Finally, in ground-based (and, to an extent, balloon-based) instruments, water and oxygen in the atmosphere emit and absorb microwave radiation. Even at frequencies where the atmospheric transmission is high, atmospheric emission contributes photon noise that limits the sensitivity of an experiment. CMB research therefore uses of air- and space-borne experiments, as well as dry, high altitude locations such as the Chilean Andes and the South Pole.

== Cosmic microwave background experiments ==
The list below consists of a partial list of past, current and planned CMB experiments. The name, start and end years of each experiment are given, followed by the basis of the experiment—whether space, balloon or ground based—and the location where appropriate. The frequency and amplifier technologies used are given, as is the main targets of the experiments.

Image	Name	Start	End	Basis	Location	Frequency (GHz)	Detector technology	Targets	References
	Advanced Cosmic Microwave Explorer (ACME); Also HACME: HEMT+ACME	1988	1996	Ground	South Pole	26–35; 38–45	HEMT	Temperature anisotropies	
	Ali CMB Polarization Telescope (AliCPT)	2025	—	Ground	Ngari (Ali), Tibet	90, 150	Bolometer	Polarization	
	Antarctic Plateau Anisotropy Chasing Experiment (APACHE)	1995	1996	Ground	Antarctic	100, 150, 250	Bolometer	Temperature anisotropies	
ARCADE	Absolute Radiometer for Cosmology, Astrophysics, and Diffuse Emission (ARCADE)	2001	2006	Balloon		3, 5, 7, 10, 30, 90	HEMT	CMB Spectrum	
Archeops	Archeops	1999	2002	Balloon		143, 217, 353, 545	Bolometer	Measured large and intermediate scale with improved precision at the larger scales.	
	Arcminute Cosmology Bolometer Array Receiver (ACBAR)	2001	2008	Ground	South Pole	150, 219, 274	Bolometer	Temperature anisotropies	
AMI	Arcminute Microkelvin Imager (AMI)	2005	—	Ground	UK: Mullard Radio Astronomy Observatory	12-18	Interferometer	SZ effect, Temperature anisotropies	
	Q U I JOint TEnerife (QUIJOTE)	2012	—	Ground	Tenerife	11, 13, 17, 19, 30, 40	Polarizer / OMT	Polarization on degree angular scales	
	ARGO	1988, 1990, 1993	1993	Balloon		150-600	Bolometer		
AMiBA	Array for Microwave Background Anisotropy (AMiBA)	2007	—	Ground	Hawaii: Mauna Loa	86-102	Interferometer/MMIC	SZ effect; Polarization	
ABS	Atacama B-Mode Search (ABS)	2012	2014	Ground	Chile: Atacama Desert	145	Bolometer	Polarization	
ACT	Atacama Cosmology Telescope (ACT)	2008	2022	Ground	Chile: Atacama Desert	148, 218, 277	Bolometer	Small-scale temperature and polarization anisotropies	
APEX	Atacama Pathfinder Experiment (APEX)	2007	—	Ground	Chile: Atacama Desert	150, 217	Bolometer	Temperature anisotropies; SZ effect	
ATCA	Australia Telescope Compact Array (ATCA)	1991	1997	Ground	Paul Wild Observatory, New South Wales, Australia	8.7	HEMT		
	Background Emission Anisotropy Scanning Telescope (BEAST)	2000	—	Balloon, Ground		25–35; 38-45	HEMT	A ground single dish CMB observatory at the University of California's White Mountain Peak Research station.	
	Background Imaging of Cosmic Extragalactic Polarization (BICEP1)	2006	2008	Ground	South Pole	100, 150, 220	Bolometer	Measured degree-scale polarization with improved precision.	
	BICEP2	2009	2012	Ground	South Pole	150	Bolometer	Degree-scale B-mode polarization.	
	Keck Array	2010		Ground	South Pole	95, 150, 220	Bolometer	Degree-scale B-mode polarization.	
	Balloon-borne Anisotropy Measurement (BAM)	1995	1998	Balloon	University of British Columbia and Brown University balloon experiment	110-250	Spectrometer	Used differential Fourier Transform Spectrometer to measure degree scale anisotropy	
	Balloon-borne Radiometers for Sky Polarisation Observations (BaR-SPoRT)	Cancelled	—	Balloon		32, 90	Polarizer / OMT		
	Berkeley-Illinois-Maryland Association (BIMA)	1986	2004	Ground	Hat Creek Radio Observatory, California, USA	70–116; 210-270	SIS		
BOOMERanG	BOOMERanG experiment	1997	2003	Balloon	Long-duration balloon above Antarctica	90-420	Bolometer	Intermediate scale fluctuations	
	B-mode RAdiation INterferometer (BRAIN)	Never	—	Ground	Dome-C, Antarctica				
	Clover	Cancelled	—	Ground		97, 150, 230	Bolometer	Cancelled experiment to measure the small scale fluctuations and to search for B-mode polarization.	
	Cobra	1982	1990	Sounding Rocket	University of British Columbia	27-900	Bolometers/ FTS	Frequency spectrum of CMB	
	Cosmic Anisotropy Polarization Mapper (CAPMAP)	2002	2008	Ground	Crawford Hill Telescope, New Jersey	40, 90	MMIC/HEMT		
	Cosmic Anisotropy Telescope (CAT)	1994	1997	Ground	Mullard Radio Astronomy Observatory	13-17	Interferometer / HEMT	Very small scale fluctuations in small regions of the sky.	
CBI	Cosmic Background Imager (CBI)	2000	2008	Ground	Llano de Chajnantor Observatory, Chile	26-36	HEMT	Very small scale temperature and polarization anisotropies in a small patch of sky.	
CLASS Experiment Site Rendering Feb 2014	Cosmology Large Angular Scale Surveyor (CLASS)	2015	—	Ground	Llano de Chajnantor Observatory, Chile	40, 90, 150, 220	TES Bolometer	B-mode polarization signal at multipoles from 2 to 100	
	Primordial Inflation Polarization Explorer (PIPER)	Future	—	Balloon		200, 270, 350, 800	TES bolometers	B-mode polarization signal	
	COSMOSOMAS	1998	2007	Ground	Teide Observatory, Tenerife, Spain	10-18	HEMT	Circular scanning experiments for CMB and foregrounds	
COBE	Cosmic Background Explorer (COBE)	1989	1993	Space	Earth orbit	31.5, 53, 90 (DMR)		Temperature anisotropies; frequency power spectrum; solar system and galactic dust foregrounds.	
COBE	Cosmic Background Explorer (COBE)	1989	1990	Space	Earth orbit	68-3000 200 frequencies (FIRAS)	Bolometers	CMB Spectrum; CMB Temperature; CIB spectrum; Temperature anisotropies; frequency power spectrum; solar system and galactic dust foregrounds.	
	TRIS	1994	2001	Ground	Campo Imperatore	0.6, 0.82, 2.5		CMB frequency power spectrum	
	COMPASS	2001	2001	Ground	Pine Bluff, Wisconsin	26 to 36	HEMT	Polarization on degree angular scales	
	Cosmological Gene (CG)	1999	2009	Ground	RATAN-600, Caucasus, Russia	0.6 to 32	HEMT		
	Degree Angular Scale Interferometer (DASI)	1999	2003	Ground	South Pole	26-36	HEMT	Temperature and polarization anisotropy on degree angular scales	
	The E and B Experiment (EBEX)	2012	2013	Balloon	Antarctica	150-450	Bolometer	Inflationary gravitational-wave background (IGB) signal in B-mode polarization	
	Far Infra-Red Survey (FIRS)	1989	1989	Balloon	National Scientific Balloon Facility, Fort Sumner, New Mexico	170-680	Bolometer	Temperature anisotropy on large angular scales.	
	KU-band Polarization IDentifier (KUPID)	2003	—	Ground	Crawford Hill Telescope, New Jersey	12-18	HEMT		
	Medium Scale Anisotropy Measurement (MSAM)	1992	1997	Balloon		150-650	Bolometer		
MAXIMA	Millimeter Anisotropy eXperiment IMaging Array (MAXIMA)	1995, 1998, 1999	1999	Balloon	Near Palestine, Texas	150-420	Bolometer	Intermediate scale temperature fluctuations.	
	Millimeter Interferometer (MINT)	2001	2002	Ground	Cerro Toco, Chile	145	SIS	Temperature anisotropies around multipole 1500	
	Millimeter-Wave Bolometric Interferometer (MBI-B)	Future	—	Ground		90	Bolometer		
	Mobile Anisotropy Telescope (MAT)	1997, 1998	1998	Ground	Cerro Toco, Chile	30-140	HEMT / SIS		
	Polarization Observations of Large Angular Regions (POLAR)	2000	2000	Ground	Pine Bluff, Wisconsin, USA	26-46	HEMT	Polarization at large angular scales	
Polarbear	POLARBEAR	2012	—	Ground	Chajnantor plateau (Chile)	150	Antenna-coupled TES	CMB Polarization. Primordial and lensed B-modes.	
	Polatron	Never	—	Ground		100	Bolometer		
	Princeton I, Q, and U Experiment (PIQUE)	2002	2002	Ground	Princeton University	90	Bolometer		
	Python	1992	1997	Ground	South Pole	30-90	HEMT / Bolometer	Temperature anisotropy on intermediate angular scales	
	QMAP	1996	1996	Balloon		30-140	HEMT / SIS		
QUaD	QUaD	2005	2007	Ground	South Pole	100, 150	Bolometer	Polarization at intermediate angular scale	
QUBIC	QUBIC	2022	—	Ground	Alto Chorrillos, Argentina	150, 220	Bolometer	B-mode polarization on intermediate angular scale.	
	Q/U Imaging ExperimenT (QUIET)	2008	2010	Ground	Llano de Chajnantor Observatory, Chile	40, 90	HEMT		
	RELIKT-1	1983	1984	Space	Earth orbit	37		Temperature anisotropies	
	Saskatoon experiment	1993	1995	Ground	Saskatchewan	26-46	HEMT		
	Simons Observatory	2021	-	Ground	Atacama	27/39, 93/145, 225/280 GHz	Bolometers	B-mode polarization, SZE galaxy clusters, sources	
	Sky Polarization Observatory (SPOrt)	Cancelled	—	Space	International Space Station	22-90		Polarization	
	South Pole Telescope	2006		Ground	South Pole			Small scale temperature and polarization.	
	SPIDER	2015		Balloon	Antarctica	90, 150, 220	Bolometer	Large scale polarization.	
SZA	Sunyaev-Zeldovich Array (SZA)	2004	2008	Ground	Owens Valley Radio Observatory	26–36; 85-115	Interferometer	Produced sensitive CMB anisotropy constraints at l ~ 4000, measured the SZ effect in hundreds of galaxy clusters. Now part of CARMA	
	MUltiplexed Squid/Tes Array for Ninety Gigahertz (MUSTANG/MUSTANG2)	2007	—	Ground	Green Bank Telescope (West Virginia, USA)	90	TES bolometers	Sunyaev-Zeldovich effect (also used for non-CMB work)	
	Sunyaev-Zeldovich Infrared Experiment (SuZIE)	1996	—	Ground	Caltech Submillimeter Observatory, Mauna Kea, Hawaii	150, 220, 350	Bolometer	SZ effect	
	Tenerife Experiment	1984	2000	Ground	Tenerife	10, 15, 33	HEMT	Temperature anisotropies from degree to arcminute angular scales	
	TopHat	2001	2001	Balloon	Antarctica	150-720	Bolometer		
	Very Small Array	2002	2008	Ground	Tenerife	26-36	Interferometer / HEMT	Intermediate and small scale fluctuations in small regions of the sky.	
WMAP	Wilkinson Microwave Anisotropy Probe (WMAP)	2001	2010	Space	Lagrange 2	23-94	HEMT	Temperature anisotropies; Polarization	
	Planck	2009	2013	Space	Lagrange 2	30-857	HEMT / Bolometer	Temperature and polarization anisotropies; foregrounds	
