= Brian Keating =

American cosmologist

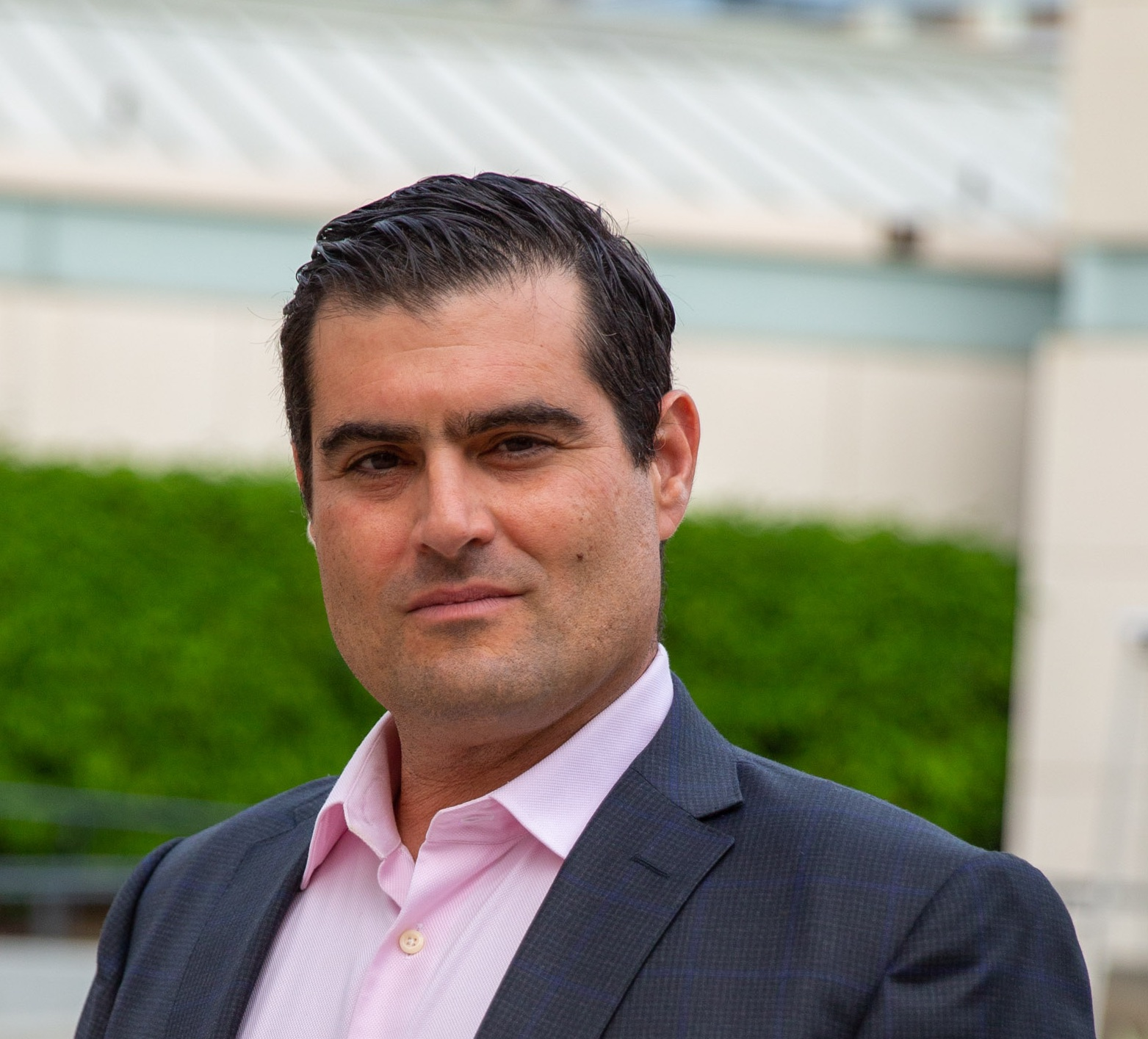
- Born: September 9, 1971
- Education: Case Western Reserve University, Brown University
- Occupations: Cosmologist; university teacher; physicist
- Awards: Presidential Early Career Award for Scientists and Engineers (2006); Buchalter Cosmology Prize (2014)
- Scientific career
- Workplaces: University of California, San Diego (2004–); California Institute of Technology (2001–2004)
- Thesis: A search for the large angular scale polarization of the cosmic microwave background
- Doctoral advisor: Peter Timbie
- Website: briankeating.com

Brian Gregory Keating (born September 9, 1971) is an American cosmologist. He works on observations of the cosmic microwave background, leading the POLARBEAR2 and Simons Array experiments. He also conceived the first BICEP experiment. He received his PhD in 2000, and is a distinguished professor of physics at University of California, San Diego, since 2019. He is the author of two books, Losing The Nobel Prize and Into the Impossible.

== Education and career ==
Keating received his B.S. degree in physics at Case Western Reserve University in 1993. He then obtained his M.S. and Ph.D. in physics at Brown University. His thesis, titled A search for the large angular scale polarization of the cosmic microwave background and supervised by Peter Timbie, was accepted in 2000. He started as a National Science Foundation (NSF) postdoctoral fellow at the California Institute of Technology in 2001 until 2004. He was an assistant professor at the University of California, San Diego from 2004, before being promoted to associate professor there in 2009. He received an NSF career grant in 2005, and a Presidential Early Career Award in 2006. Keating was one of three scientists, along with Jonathan Kaufman and Bradley Johnson, to receive the Buchalter Cosmology Prize in 2014. He became co-director of the Ax Center for Experimental Cosmology and the Joan & Irwin Jacobs Program in Astrophysics in 2013.

Keating became a professor at UC San Diego in 2014. He became a fellow of the American Physical Society in 2016. In 2019 he became the Chancellor's Distinguished Professor of Physics at UC San Diego, in the Center for Astrophysics & Space Sciences, which is part of the Department of Physics. Keating received an Excellence in Stewardship Award in 2018/19, and is an honorary member of the National Society of Black Physicists. He is co-director of the Arthur C. Clarke Center for the Human Imagination at UC San Diego. He received the Horace Mann Medal from Brown University Graduate School in 2022.

== Research ==
Keating researches cosmology, focusing on the study of the cosmic microwave background and its relationship to the origin and evolution of the universe. He conceived the BICEP (Background Imaging of Cosmic Extragalactic Polarization) instrument, which observed from the South Pole. BICEP received a NASA Group Achievement Award in 2010. In 2016 he convinced the Simons Foundation to provide US$38.4m of funding for what later became the Simons Array, and in 2019 a US$20m grant from the Simons Foundation led to the creation of the Simons Observatory, followed by an additional US$4.6m in 2021. Keating co-leads POLARBEAR2 and the Simons Array in Chile, is the Principal Investigator of Simons Observatory, and has raised around US$100m of funding for CMB telescopes.

He has two patents, on a "wide-bandwidth polarization modulator for microwave and mm-wavelengths" in 2009, and "Tunnel junction fabrication" in 2016.

== Podcast and outreach ==
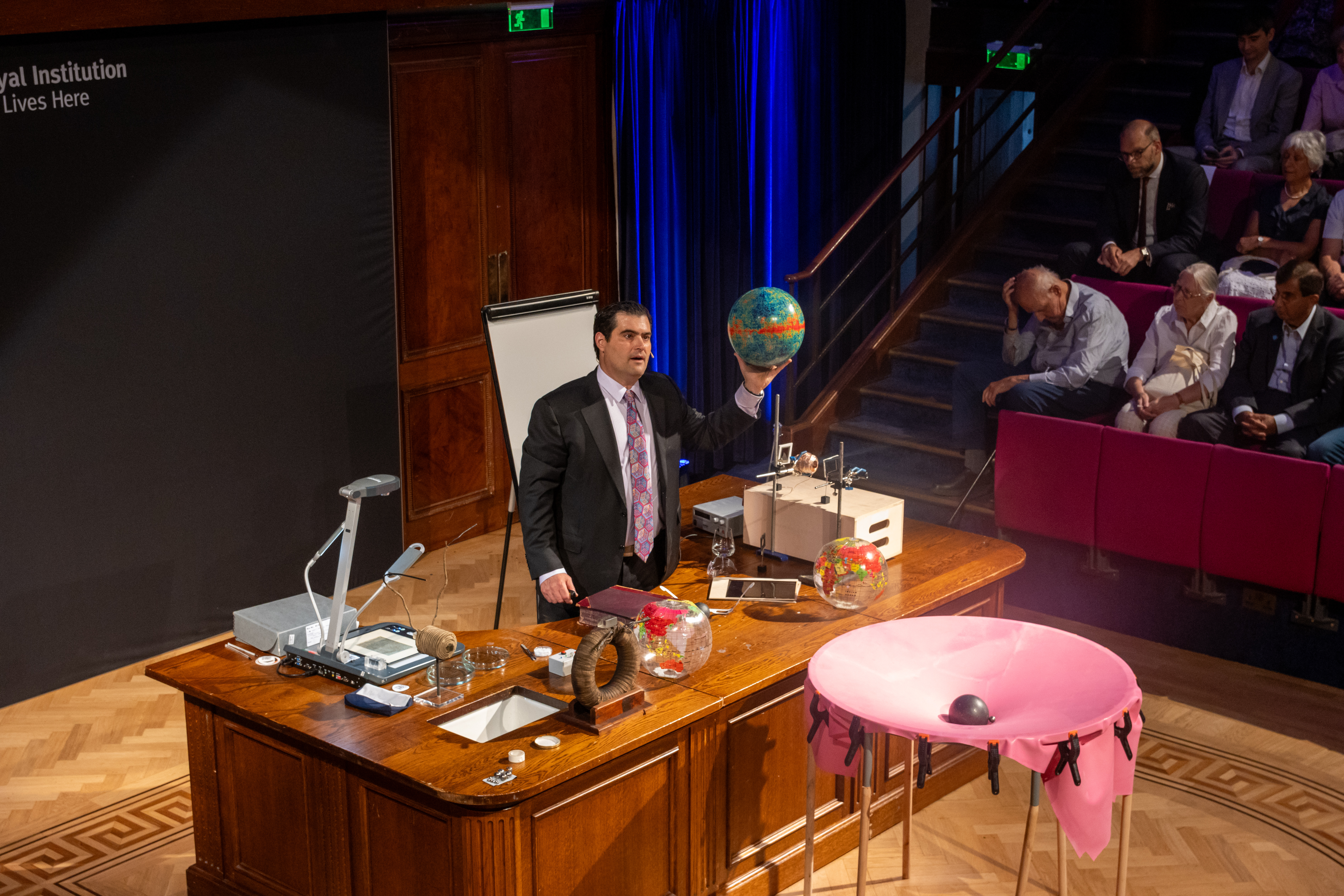
Keating presenting at the Royal Institution in 2023

Keating has hosted the Clarke Center Into the Impossible podcast since 2016. It takes its name from the second of Clarke's three laws: "The only way of discovering the limits of the possible is to venture a little way past them into the impossible." Each episode is a long-form conversation with nobel laureates, scientists, writers and other notable individuals such as Stephen C. Meyer (an advocate of intelligent design), Noam Chomsky, Eric Weinstein, Jill Tarter, Sara Seager lasting around an hour. As of 2022 it has hosted 11 Nobel Prize winners and two recipients of the Pulitzer Prize. It reached 200,000 subscribers in 2024.

Keating also appeared in The Michael Shermer Show podcast in 2019, and the Lex Fridman Podcast in 2022. He has also recorded videos for conservative website PragerU, and has talked about popular science connected with The Witcher television series. He appeared in the "Mysteries Of The Moon" episode of The UnXplained.

He also teaches astronomy to high school students since 2012 as part of his outreach work, and has given presentations to over 3,000 K-12 students since 1994.

He has also co-narrated a 21-hour audio book of Galileo Galilei's Dialogue Concerning the Two Chief World Systems in 2022.

== Books about the Nobel Prize ==
Keating is critical of the way that Nobel Prizes are organized, saying that "No scientist arrives alone in Stockholm." He has written two books on the topic. The Nobel Prize was a motivating factor in Keating's career due to his academic rivalry with his father.

=== Losing The Nobel Prize (2018) ===
Keating published his first book Losing the Nobel Prize: A Story of Cosmology, Ambition, and the Perils of Science's Highest Honor on April 24, 2018. The book describes the BICEP and BICEP2 experiments, which were located at the South Pole and were devised to detect and map the polarization of the cosmic microwave background radiation leftover from the Big Bang. BICEP2's data showed strong polarization signals that were announced to be cosmological in origin, but were later shown by Planck satellite data to be caused by polarized interstellar dust.

The first part of the book describes the background behind cosmological inflation, and the second covers BICEP2. The third section focuses on Keating's issues with the Nobel Prize, including lack of diversity in the recipients, that the prize cannot be awarded posthumously, the maximum of three laureates per prize, which excludes larger groups from receiving it, and the secrecy around nominations. According to Keating, all of these "reward an outdated version of science", and "better science comes from inclusivity, collaboration, and innovation". He argues that the science Nobel Prizes have strayed from the original intent of Alfred Nobel's will, and may hinder scientific progress by fostering unnecessary, and sometimes destructive, competition. He proposed that half a Nobel prize should go to the leaders of a collaboration, with the other half awarded to the rest of the team of scientists working on the project.

=== Into the Impossible (2021) ===
His second book, Into the Impossible, was published in 2021. It features interviews with Nobel Prize winners Adam Riess, Rainer Weiss, Sheldon Glashow, Carl Wieman, Roger Penrose, Duncan Haldane, Frank Wilczek, John C. Mather and Barry Barish.

== Personal life ==
Keating was born on September 9, 1971, the son of the mathematician James Ax, and his wife Barbara. When he was about seven, his parents divorced and his mother remarried, and the young Brian took his stepfather's name, Keating. He was out of contact with his father for the next 15 years, reconnecting only when he was a graduate student. Keating grew up in Dobbs Ferry, New York. He has three brothers: Kevin, Nick and Shaya.

Keating was born to Jewish parents, but they divorced and his mother married a Catholic. He became a member of the Catholic Church, although his mother and father were non-observant Jews. He later became an atheist, and subsequently he became an observant Jew, currently describing himself as a "practicing devout agnostic".

As well as a cosmologist, he is a pilot with a multi-engine turbine license. He was a trustee of Math for America, San Diego in 2006–2014, Angel Flight West in 2010–2015, and the National Museum of Mathematics in 2014–2017. He is currently a trustee of San Diego Air & Space Museum since 2013, and is on the Ruben H. Fleet Museum advisory council since 2017.
