= Crossed Dragone =

Type of telescope

The Crossed Dragone Telescope is an off-axis telescope design consisting of a parabolic primary mirror and a large concave secondary mirror arranged so that the focal plane is at right angles to the incoming light. In this configuration the polarization of light is preserved through the optics.

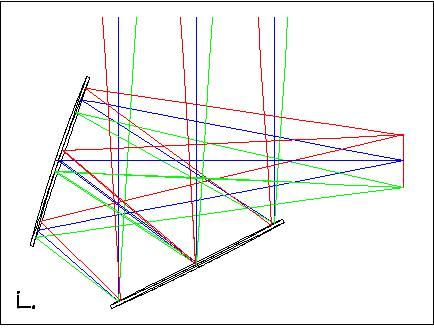
A cross section of a ray trace through a Crossed Dragone telescope. The primary mirror is on the bottom, the secondary on the left and the focal plane on the right.

Other advantages of this design are a large field of view in a compact volume. Due to its off-axis nature the secondary mirror does not block any of the incoming light. At millimeter and submillimeter wavelengths this greatly decreases systematic effects due to diffraction. The main disadvantage is that the size of the secondary mirror is of similar size to the primary mirror making it expensive to make and heavy (requiring large supports). However, for professional applications where low systematic effects are critical (for example in cosmic microwave background experiments), the benefits of low systematics across a large field of view can far out-weight these disadvantages.

== History ==
Corrado Dragone, from whom this optical design gets its name, first described the design in his 1978 paper. Several follow-up papers were published in the 1980s, however it was not until recently that astronomers have been able to build focal planes large enough to warrant the extra construction costs associated with the large secondary mirror of the Cross Dragone design. Older millimeter or submillimeter telescopes have typically been of Gregorian or Cassegrain designs.

== Examples ==
Some examples of existing and planned telescopes that use this design include:

- The QUIET experiment
- The Atacama B-mode Search (ABS)
- EPIC-IM
- Fred Young Submillimeter Telescope
- Simons Observatory
- CMB-S4 Experiment
- BINGO (telescope)

== Variations ==
Although the field of view of Crossed Dragone telescope is large, it can be increased further by the addition of canceling aspheric terms in the primary and secondary mirror shapes. This approach has been used by the Simons Observatory Large telescope and the CCAT-prime telescope currently (2021) under construction in Chile. This comes at the cost of breaking the symmetry of the mirrors – they are no longer rotationally symmetric around any axis. Modern machining techniques can cut such surfaces but on a large telescope the mirror will be made of many segments/panels. When aspheric terms are added, each panel becomes different adding to manufacturing costs.
