= Saskatoon experiment =

Astronomical experiment

- Location(s): Saskatoon, Saskatchewan, Canada
- Wavelength: 0.65 cm (46 GHz)–1.2 cm (25 GHz)
- Website: www.physics.princeton.edu/cosmology/sk/

The Saskatoon experiment (SK experiment or SK) was a ground-based telescope experiment to measure the anisotropy of the cosmic microwave background (CMB) at multipole moments between 60 and 360. It was named after Saskatoon, Saskatchewan, Canada, where the experiment took place, occurring in the Canadian winters of 1993 to 1995.

The experiment intended to measure the temperature fluctuations of the CMB at smaller angular scales than demonstrated with COBE, therefore at degree angular scales less than 7 degrees.

== See also ==
- Cosmic microwave background experiments
- Observational cosmology
