= John M. Kovac =

American physicist and astronomer (born 1970)

John M Kovac
- Born: 25 October 1970 (age 55)
- Education: Princeton University; University of Chicago
- Known for: BICEP2, BICEP and Keck Array
- Scientific career
- Fields: Experimental Physics and Cosmology
- Workplaces: Caltech; Harvard
- Thesis: Detection of Polarization in the Cosmic Microwave Background using DASI
- Doctoral advisor: John Carlstrom

John Michael Kovac (born 1970) is an American physicist and astronomer. His cosmology research, conducted at the Center for Astrophysics | Harvard & Smithsonian in Cambridge, Massachusetts, focuses on observations of the Cosmic Microwave Background (CMB) to reveal signatures of the physics that drove the birth of the universe, the creation of its structure, and its present-day expansion. Currently, Kovac is Professor of Astronomy and Physics at Harvard University.

== Education and early life ==
Kovac was born in Princeton, New Jersey. He attended Jesuit High School in Tampa, Florida. He received a bachelor's degree in Mathematics from Princeton University. He went on to the University of Chicago to receive a Masters and Doctorate in Physics in 2004. His thesis advisor was John Carlstrom.

== Career ==
He was the principal investigator of the BICEP2 telescope, which was part of the BICEP and Keck Array series of experiments. Measurements announced on 17 March 2014 from the BICEP2 telescope appeared to support the idea of cosmic inflation, by reporting the first evidence for a primordial B-Mode pattern in the polarization of the CMB. Further analysis revealed this result to be spurious, and that the signal had been contaminated by interstellar dust in the Milky Way.

Prior to BICEP2, as a graduate student at the University of Chicago, Kovac worked on the Degree Angular Scale Interferometer led by John Carlstrom, which in 2002 announced the first detection of polarization in the CMB. In 2003, Kovac moved to Caltech as a Millikan Postdoctoral Fellow, beginning work under Andrew Lange on the QUaD telescope and on BICEP1, the predecessor of BICEP2. After BICEP1's deployment to the South Pole in 2006, at Lange's invitation Kovac joined the research faculty of Caltech as a Kilroy Fellow and led the team that proposed BICEP2. In 2009 Kovac joined the faculty at Harvard University.

== Awards ==
In 2013 Kovac received the National Science Foundation Career Award. He was a recipient of the 2014 Presidential Early Career Award for Scientists and Engineers. In 2011 Kovac was selected as a Sloan Research Fellow. He was awarded the 2002–2003 Sugarman Award by the Enrico Fermi Institute.
