= BICEP and Keck Array =

Series of cosmic microwave background experiments at the South Pole

BICEP
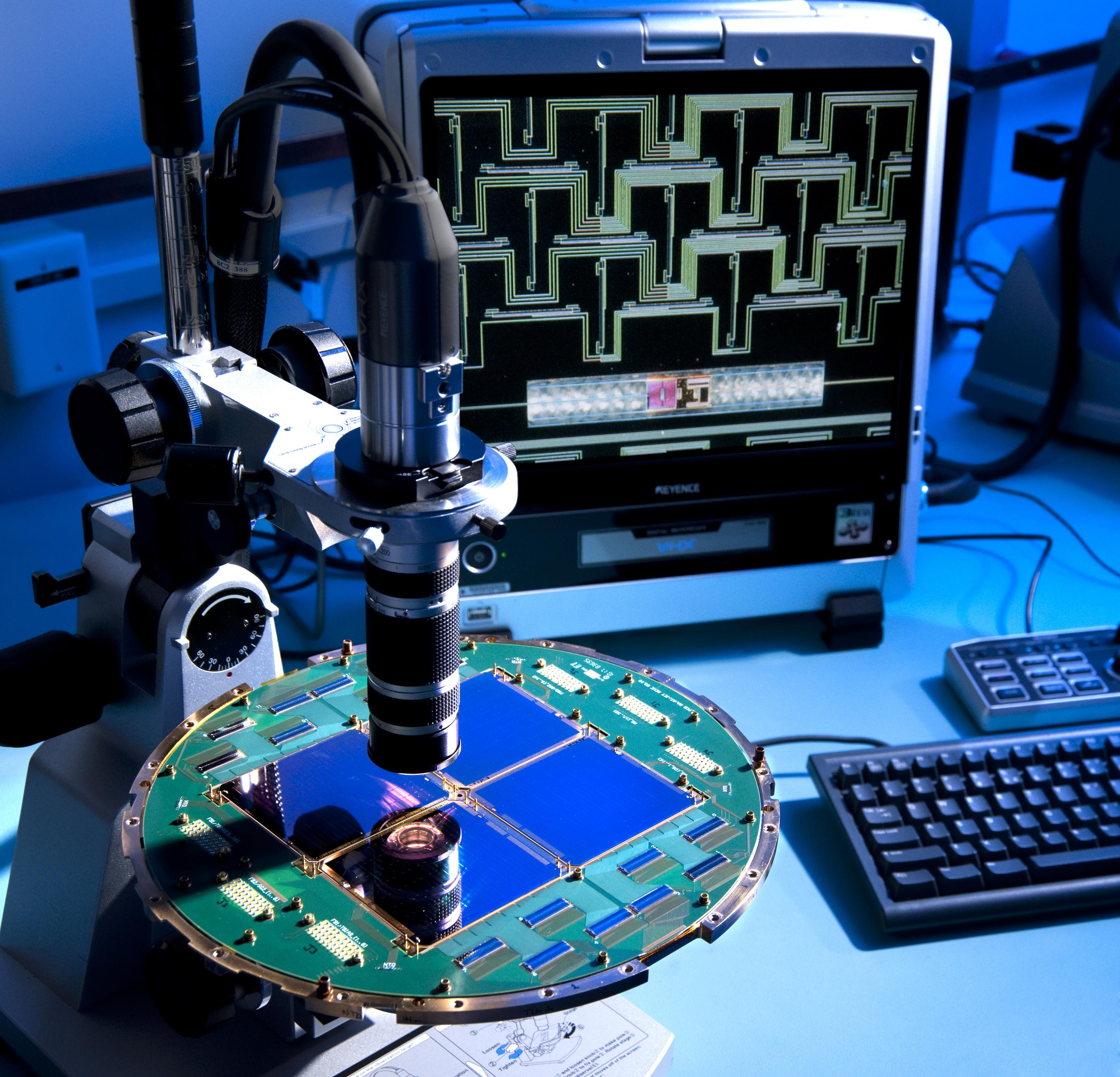
- The BICEP2 detector array under a microscope
- Alternative names: Background Imaging of Cosmic Extragalactic Polarization
- Location: Antarctic Treaty area
- Coordinates: 89°59′59″S 0°00′00″E
- Wavelength: 95, 150, 220 GHz (3.2, 2.0, 1.4 mm)
- Diameter: 0.25 m (9.8 in)
- Website: www.cfa.harvard.edu/CMB/keckarray/
- Location within Antarctica
- Related media on Commons

BICEP (Background Imaging of Cosmic Extragalactic Polarization) and the Keck Array are a series of cosmic microwave background (CMB) experiments, deployed near the South Pole. These are cryogenic telescopes with arrays of detectors sensitive to several frequencies of microwave radiation. They aim to measure the polarization of the CMB, in order to find signals from primordial gravitational waves predicted by "slow roll" models of cosmic inflation. As of 2025, the relevant polarization from primordial gravitational waves has not been detected.

The experiments have had five generations of instrumentation, consisting of BICEP1 (or just BICEP), BICEP2, the Keck Array, BICEP3, and the BICEP Array. BICEP1 collected data from 2006 to 2008 and BICEP2 observed from 2010 to 2012. The Keck Array, consisting of five telescopes, started observations in 2012 and BICEP3 has been fully operational since May 2016. The BICEP Array of four telescopes is currently being constructed; its first telescope began collecting data in 2019 and the second one in 2022.

== Purpose and collaboration ==
Gravitational waves may arise from inflation, a phase of accelerated expansion after the Big Bang.

The purpose of the BICEP experiments is to measure the polarization of the cosmic microwave background. Specifically, they aim to measure the B-modes (curl component) of the polarization of the CMB. BICEP operates from Antarctica, at the Amundsen–Scott South Pole Station. All three instruments have mapped the same part of the sky, around the south celestial pole.

The institutions involved in the various instruments are Caltech, Cardiff University, University of Chicago, Center for Astrophysics | Harvard & Smithsonian, Jet Propulsion Laboratory, CEA Grenoble (FR), University of Minnesota and Stanford University (all experiments); UC San Diego (BICEP1 and 2); National Institute of Standards and Technology (NIST), University of British Columbia and University of Toronto (BICEP2, Keck Array and BICEP3); and Case Western Reserve University (Keck Array).

The series of experiments began at the California Institute of Technology in 2002. In collaboration with the Jet Propulsion Laboratory, physicists Andrew Lange, Jamie Bock, Brian Keating, and William Holzapfel began the construction of the BICEP1 telescope which deployed to the Amundsen-Scott South Pole Station in 2005 for a three-season observing run. Immediately after deployment of BICEP1, the team, which now included Caltech postdoctoral fellows John Kovac and Chao-Lin Kuo, among others, began work on BICEP2. The telescope remained the same, but new detectors were inserted into BICEP2 using a completely different technology: a printed circuit board on the focal plane that could filter, process, image, and measure radiation from the cosmic microwave background. BICEP2 was deployed to the South Pole in 2009 to begin its three-season observing run which yielded the detection of B-mode polarization in the cosmic microwave background.

The main properties of the BICEP instruments
Instrument	Start	End	Frequency	Resolution	Sensors (pixels)	Refs
BICEP	2006	2008	100 GHz	0.93°	50 (25)	
BICEP	2006	2008	150 GHz	0.60°	48 (24)	
BICEP2	2010	2012	150 GHz	0.52°	500 (250)	
Keck Array	2011	2011	150 GHz	0.52°	1488 (744)	
Keck Array	2012	2012	150 GHz	0.52°	2480 (1240)	
Keck Array	2013	2018	150 GHz	0.52°	1488 (744)	
Keck Array	2013	2018	95 GHz	0.7°	992 (496)	
BICEP3	2015	—	95 GHz	0.35°	2560 (1280)	

== BICEP1 ==
The first BICEP instrument (known during development as the "Robinson gravitational wave background telescope" and later as "BICEP1") was installed on top of the Dark Sector Laboratory, right next to the South Pole Telescope in the "dark sector", where electromagnetic noise is minimized. It is located about 1 kilometer from the main South Pole Station.

The instrument, a prototype for future instruments, was first described in Keating et al. 2003, started observing in January 2006 and ran until the end of 2008.

It observed the sky at 100 and 150 GHz (3 mm and 2 mm wavelength) with an angular resolution of 1.0 and 0.7 degrees. It had an array of 98 detectors (50 at 100 GHz and 48 at 150 GHz), which were sensitive to the polarisation of the CMB. A pair of detectors constitutes one polarization-sensitive pixel.

== BICEP2 ==
The second-generation instrument was BICEP2. Featuring a greatly improved focal-plane transition edge sensor (TES) bolometer array of 512 sensors (256 pixels) operating at 150 GHz, this 26 cm aperture telescope replaced the BICEP1 instrument, and observed from 2010 to 2012.

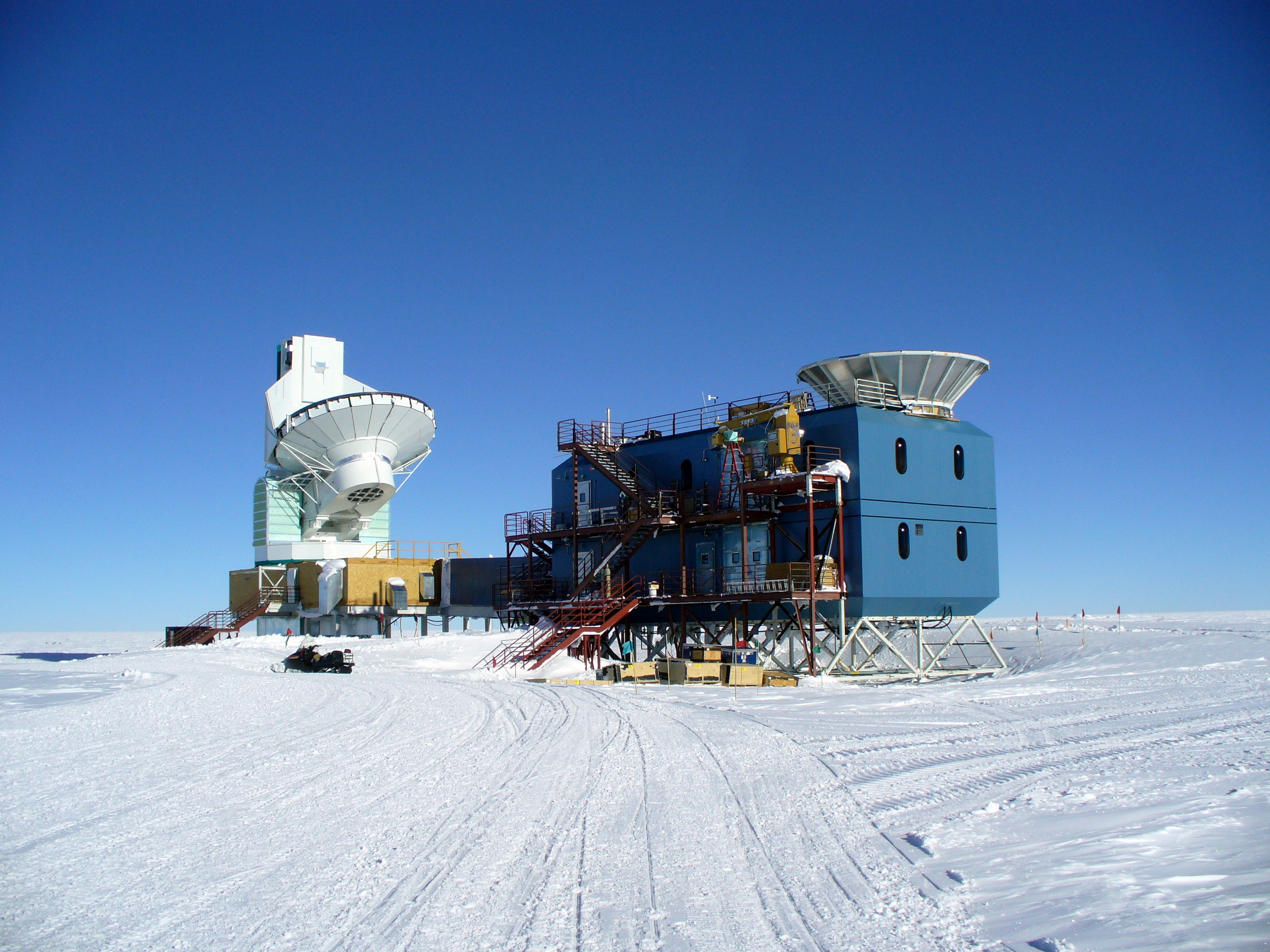
South Pole Telescope (left) and Dark Sector Laboratory with BICEP2 (right)

Reports stated in March 2014 that BICEP2 had detected B-modes from gravitational waves in the early universe (called primordial gravitational waves), a result reported by the four co-principal investigators of BICEP2: John M. Kovac of the Center for Astrophysics | Harvard & Smithsonian; Chao-Lin Kuo of Stanford University; Jamie Bock of the California Institute of Technology; and Clem Pryke of the University of Minnesota. An announcement was made on 17 March 2014 from the Center for Astrophysics | Harvard & Smithsonian. The reported detection was of B-modes at the level of r = 0.20+0.07
−0.05, disfavouring the null hypothesis (r = 0) at the level of 7 sigma (5.9σ after foreground subtraction).

However, on 19 June 2014, lowered confidence in confirming the cosmic inflation findings was reported; the accepted and reviewed version of the discovery paper contains an appendix discussing the possible production of the signal by cosmic dust. In part because the large value of the tensor to scalar ratio, which contradicts limits from the Planck data, this is considered the most likely explanation for the detected signal by many scientists. For example, on June 5, 2014 at a conference of the American Astronomical Society, astronomer David Spergel argued that the B-mode polarization detected by BICEP2 could instead be the result of light emitted from dust between the stars in our Milky Way galaxy.

A preprint released by the Planck team in September 2014, eventually accepted in 2016, provided the most accurate measurement yet of dust, concluding that the signal from dust is the same strength as that reported from BICEP2. On January 30, 2015, a joint analysis of BICEP2 and Planck data was published and the European Space Agency announced that the signal can be entirely attributed to dust in the Milky Way.

BICEP2 has combined their data with the Keck Array and Planck in a joint analysis. A March 2015 publication in Physical Review Letters set a limit on the tensor-to-scalar ratio of r < 0.12.

The BICEP2 affair forms the subject of a book by Brian Keating.

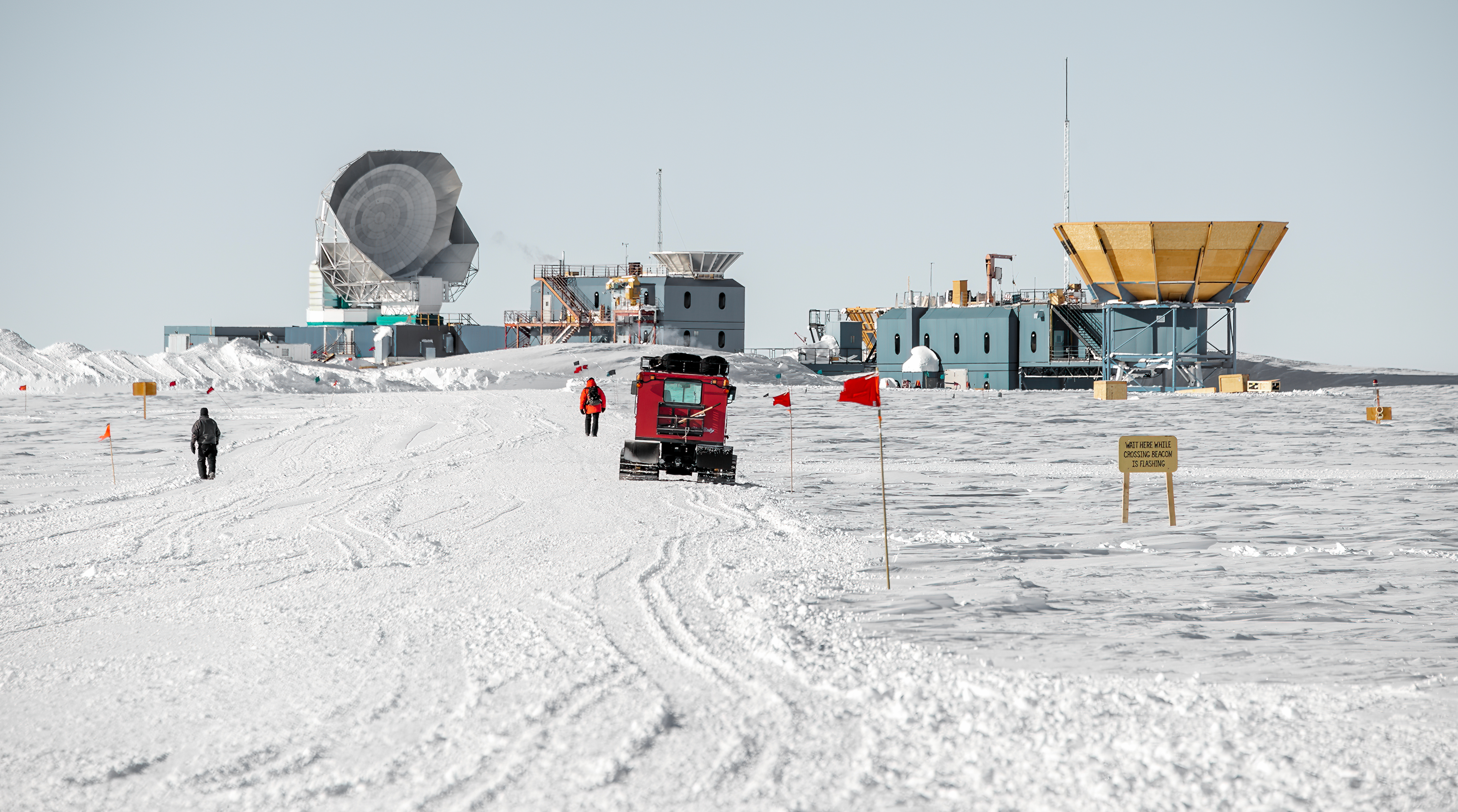
South Pole Telescope (left), Dark Sector Laboratory with BICEP3 (center background), Martin A. Pomerantz Observatory with Keck Array (right)

== Keck Array ==
Immediately next to the BICEP telescope at the Martin A. Pomerantz Observatory building was an unused telescope mount previously occupied by the Degree Angular Scale Interferometer. The Keck Array was built to take advantage of this larger telescope mount. This project was funded by $2.3 million from W. M. Keck Foundation, as well as funding from the National Science Foundation, the Gordon and Betty Moore Foundation, the James and Nelly Kilroy Foundation and the Barzan Foundation. The Keck Array project was originally led by Andrew Lange.

The Keck Array consists of five polarimeters, each very similar to the BICEP2 design, but using a pulse tube refrigerator rather than a large liquid helium cryogenic storage dewar.

The first three started observations in the austral summer of 2010–11; another two started observing in 2012. All of the receivers observed at 150 GHz until 2013, when two of them were converted to observe at 100 GHz. Each polarimeter consists of a refracting telescope (to minimise systematics) cooled by a pulse tube cooler to 4 K, and a focal-plane array of 512 transition edge sensors cooled to 250 mK, giving a total of 2560 detectors, or 1280 dual-polarization pixels.

In October 2018, the first results from the Keck Array (combined with BICEP2 data) were announced, using observations up to and including the 2015 season. These yielded an upper limit on cosmological B-modes of $r<0.07$ (95% confidence level), which reduces to $r<0.06$ in combination with Planck data.

In October 2021, new results were announced giving $r<0.036$ (at 95% confidence level) based on BICEP/Keck 2018 observation season combined with Planck and WMAP data.

== BICEP3 ==
Once the Keck array was completed in 2012, it was no longer cost-effective to continue to operate BICEP2. However, using the same technique as the Keck array to eliminate the large liquid helium dewar, a much larger telescope has been installed on the original BICEP telescope mount.

BICEP3 consists of a single telescope with the same 2560 detectors (observing at 95 GHz) as the five-telescope Keck array, but a 68 cm aperture, providing roughly twice the optical throughput of the entire Keck array. One consequence of the large focal plane is a larger 28° field of view, which will necessarily mean scanning some foreground-contaminated portions of the sky. It was installed (with initial configuration) at the pole in January 2015. It was upgraded for the 2015-2016 Austral summer season to a full 2560 detector configuration. BICEP3 is also a prototype for the BICEP Array.

== BICEP Array ==
The Keck array is being succeeded by the BICEP array, which consists of four BICEP3-like telescopes on a common mount, operating at 30/40, 95, 150 and 220/270 GHz. Installation began between the 2017 and 2018 observing seasons. It was originally scheduled to be fully installed by the 2020 observing season.

According to the project website: "BICEP Array will measure the polarized sky in five frequency bands to reach an ultimate sensitivity to the amplitude of IGW [inflationary gravitational waves] of σ(r) < 0.005" and "This measurement will be a definitive test of slow-roll models of inflation, which generally predict a gravitational-wave signal above approximately 0.01."

The first telescope of the BICEP Array, termed BA1, has been collecting data at 30/40 GHz since 2019/2020. The second one, BA2, operating at 150GHz, was deployed in 2022/2023.

== See also ==
- Cosmology
- Inflation (cosmology)
- Atacama Cosmology Telescope
- South Pole Telescope
- Cosmology Large Angular Scale Surveyor
- POLARBEAR
- LiteBIRD, space-based CMB B-mode polarization search project
- Spider, balloon-based CMB B-mode polarization project
