= POLARBEAR =

Astronomical experiment

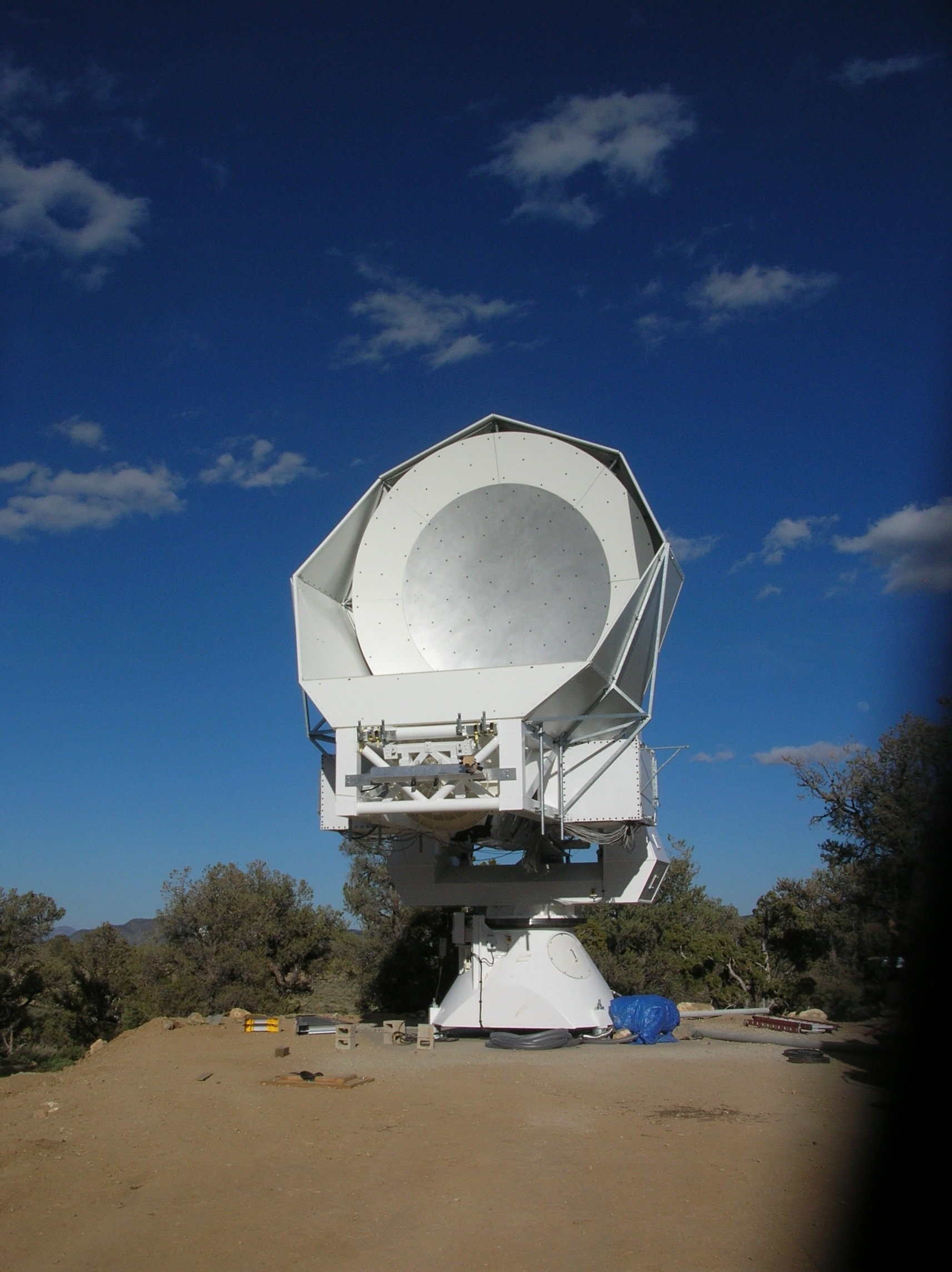
- Location(s): Atacama Desert
- Coordinates: 22°57′29″S 67°47′10″W
- Altitude: 5,200 m (17,100 ft)
- Wavelength: 148, 95 GHz (2.03, 3.16 mm)
- First light: 10 January 2012
- Telescope style: cosmic microwave background experiment radio telescope
- Diameter: 2.5 m (8 ft 2 in)
- Angular resolution: 3.5 arcminute
- Website: bolo.berkeley.edu/polarbear/
- Location of POLARBEAR
- Related media on Commons

POLARBEAR (POLARization of the Background Radiation) is a cosmic microwave background polarization experiment located in the Atacama Desert of northern Chile in the Antofagasta Region. The POLARBEAR experiment is mounted on the Huan Tran Telescope (HTT) at the James Ax Observatory in the Chajnantor Science Reserve. The HTT is located near the Atacama Cosmology Telescope on the slopes of Cerro Toco at an altitude of nearly 5,200 m (17,100 ft).

POLARBEAR was developed by an international collaboration which includes University of California, Berkeley, Lawrence Berkeley National Lab, University of Colorado at Boulder, University of California, San Diego, Imperial College, Astroparticle and Cosmology Laboratory of the University of Paris (2019), KEK (High Energy Accelerator Research Organization), McGill University, and Cardiff University.

== History ==
The instrument was first installed at the Combined Array for Research in Millimeter-wave Astronomy site near Westgard Pass in California (USA) for an engineering run in 2010. It was then moved to its final destination in the Atacama Desert in September 2011. POLARBEAR saw first light on January 10, 2012, and began its first observing season in April 2012.

In October 2014, POLARBEAR published a measurement of B-mode polarization at 150 GHz. These measurements focused on arcminute scale fluctuations likely sourced by gravitational lensing by intervening large-scale structure. Earlier in the year, the BICEP2 project published related measurements of degree-scale B-mode polarization, possibly sourced by primordial gravitational waves from cosmic inflation, but they could not rule out cosmic dust as a cause.

POLARBEAR's published measurements focused on a small but clean patch of the sky where galactic foregrounds should be subdominant to gravitational lensing B-modes. The POLARBEAR team was able to report that the measured B-mode polarization was of cosmic origin at a 97.2% confidence level by focusing their observing time on this small patch where they are highly sensitive to arcminute anisotropies. However, this observing strategy is insensitive to the larger degree-scale inflationary B-modes that BICEP2 and Keck Array have searched for.

== See also ==
- Atacama Cosmology Telescope
- BICEP and Keck Array
- Brian Keating
- LiteBIRD
- Llano de Chajnantor Observatory
- Simons Observatory
