= Llano de Chajnantor Observatory =

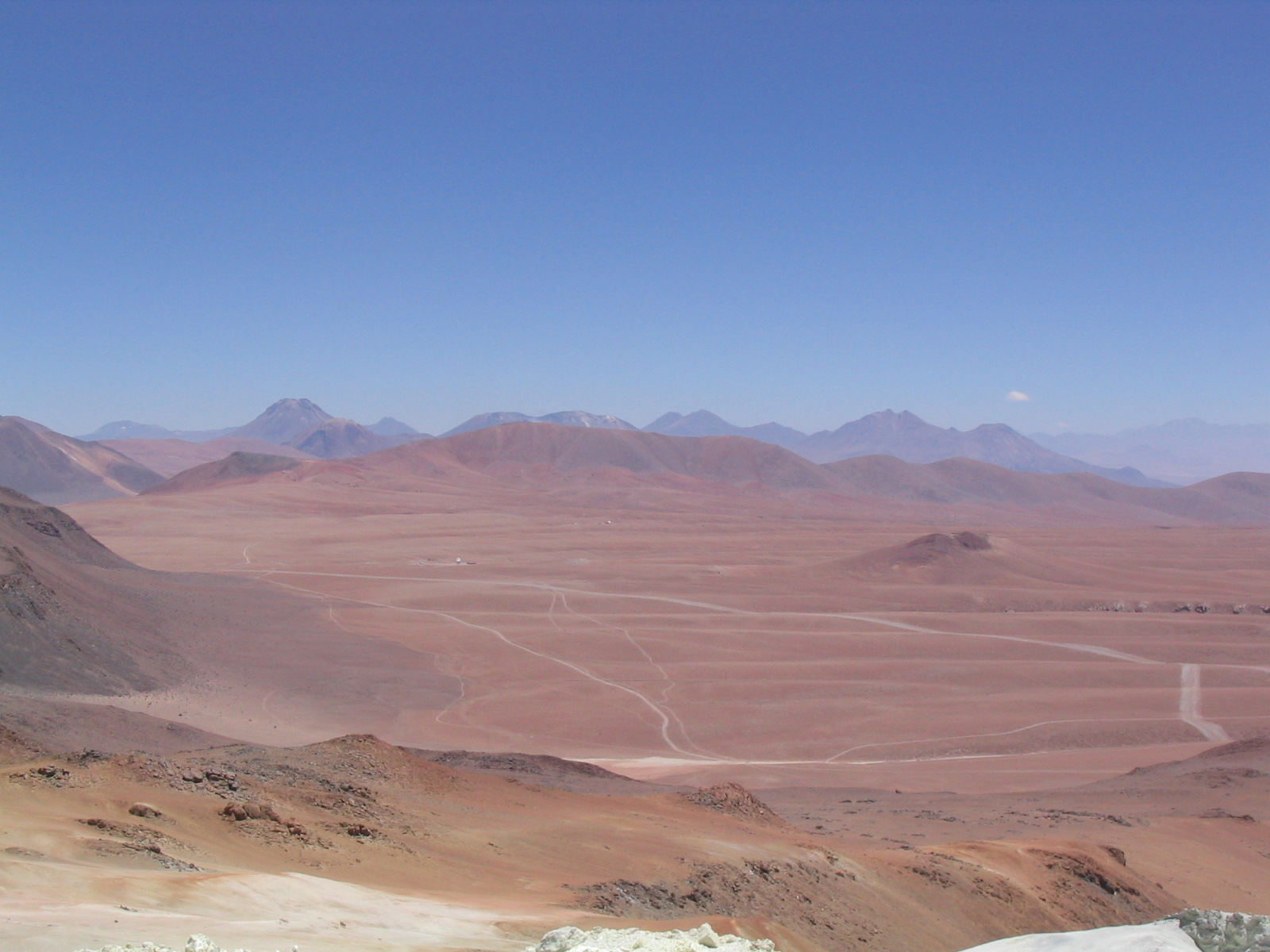
- Location: Antofagasta Region, Chile
- Coordinates: 23°01′22″S 67°45′18″W
- Altitude: 4,800 m (15,700 ft)
- Telescopes: Atacama Cosmology Telescope; Atacama Large Millimeter Array; Atacama Pathfinder Experiment; Atacama Submillimeter Telescope Experiment; NANTEN2 Observatory; POLARBEAR; QUIET; University of Tokyo Atacama Observatory
- Location of Llano de Chajnantor Observatory
- Related media on Commons

Llano de Chajnantor Observatory is the name for a group of astronomical observatories located at an altitude of over 4,800 m (15,700 ft) in the Atacama Desert of northern Chile. The site is in the Antofagasta Region approximately 50 kilometres (31 mi) east of the town of San Pedro de Atacama. The exceptionally arid climate of the area is inhospitable to humans, but creates an excellent location for millimeter, submillimeter, and mid-infrared astronomy. This is because water vapour absorbs and attenuates submillimetre radiation. Llano de Chajnantor is home to the largest and most expensive astronomical telescope project in the world, the Atacama Large Millimeter Array (ALMA). Llano de Chajnantor and the surrounding area has been designated as the Chajnantor Science Reserve (Spanish: Reserva Científica de Chajnantor) by the government of Chile.

== Site description ==
The Llano de Chajnantor is located on the western side of the Puna de Atacama, which is another name for the southern part of the Altiplano. The main ridge of the Andes is over 200 kilometres (120 mi) to the east, well into Argentina. The Salar de Atacama basin borders the Puna de Atacama to the west, which in turn is bordered by the Cordillera Domeyko. The western side of the Puna de Atacama is dotted with the volcanoes of the Central Volcanic Zone of the Andean Volcanic Belt. The Llano de Chajnantor site itself is bounded by volcanic peaks of the Purico Complex, which have been active in the Holocene but have not erupted in historic times. Cerro Chajnantor is to the north, Cerro El Chascón to the east, and smaller peaks to the south and west. The Pampa la Bola lies to the northeast, north of Cerro El Chascón and east of Cerro Chajnantor. Llano de Chajnantor has an average elevation of 5,000 m (16,000 ft), while Pampa la Bola averages 4,800 m (15,700 ft). The thin atmosphere makes work difficult for humans, so much of the activity for ALMA will be conducted at a base camp in the Salar de Atacama basin at approximately 2,900 m (9,500 ft) in elevation.

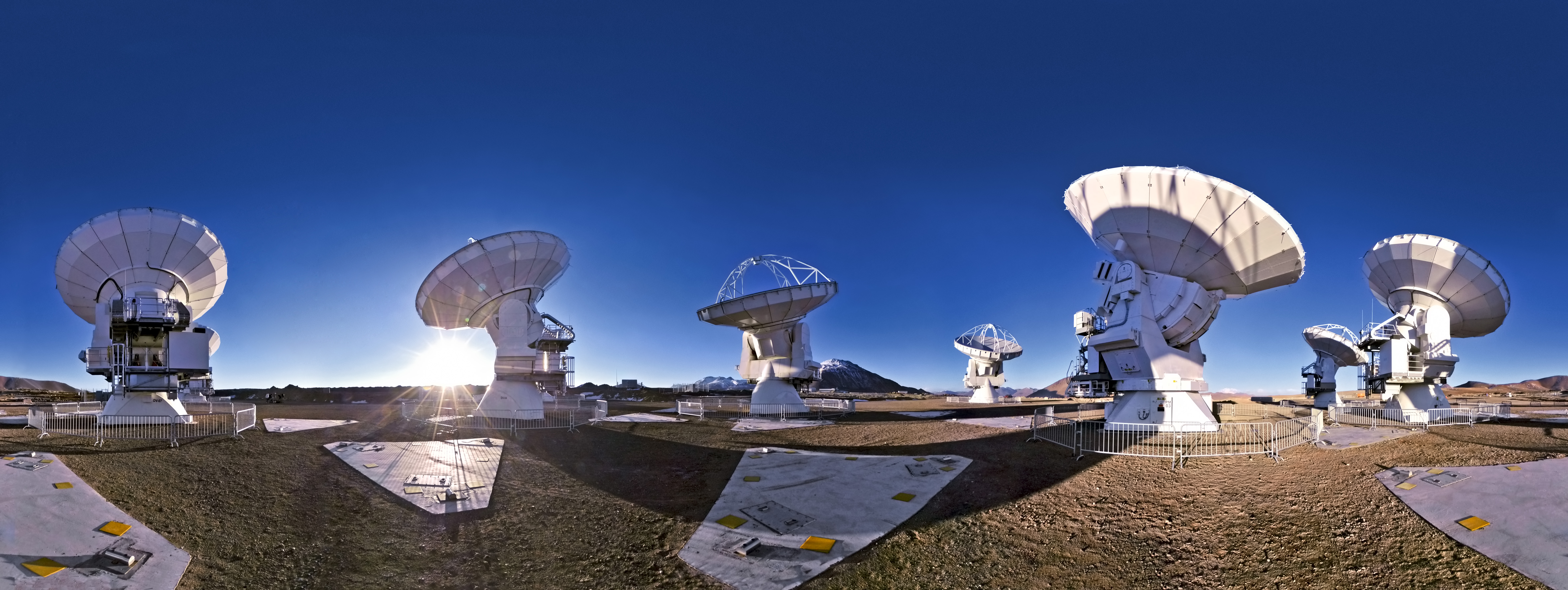
360-degree panorama of the Chajnantor plateau

Rainfall at the ALMA site averages 100 mm (3.9 in) annually. The dry climate of Llano de Chajnantor is due to three factors: the rain shadows created by the Andes and the Chilean Coastal Range, the inversion created by the Humboldt Current off the coast of Chile, and dry air descending between the Hadley cell and the Ferrel cell, which forms the South Pacific High. While the site is generally viewed as being in the Atacama Desert, in terms of ecoregions it is in the Central Andean dry puna. Llano de Chajnantor is at the same latitude as deserts in southern Africa and central Australia.

== Telescopes ==
=== Telescopes on Llano de Chajnantor ===
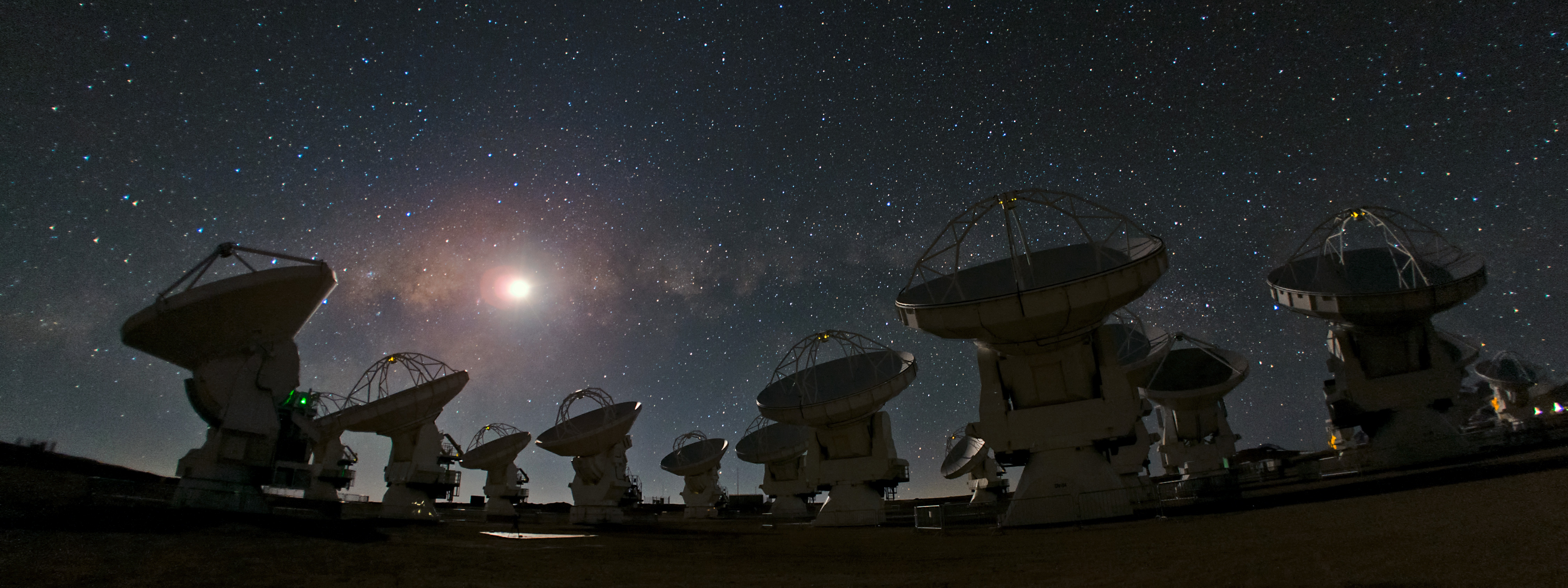
The Atacama Large Millimeter Array (ALMA)

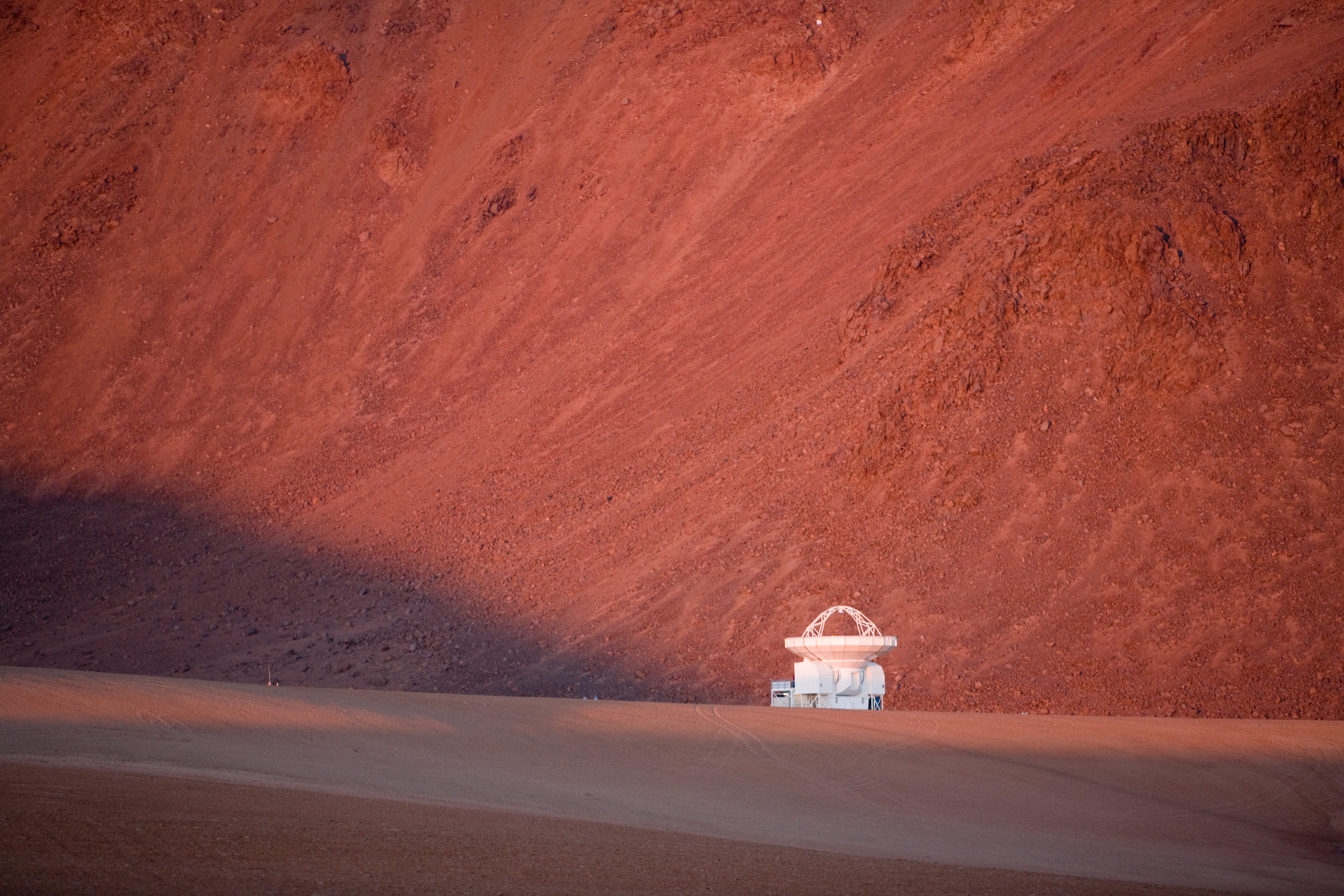
The Atacama Pathfinder Experiment (APEX), a new-technology 12-m telescope in operation since 2005 on Llano de Chajnantor

- The Atacama Large Millimeter Array (ALMA) is a large submillimetre radio telescope interferometer at Llano de Chajnantor, consisting of 54 big 12 m (39 ft) and 12 smaller 7 m (23 ft) parabolic antennas. Due to the high projected total cost of over $1.3 billion, ALMA has been developed and is run by a consortium led by the National Radio Astronomy Observatory and the European Southern Observatory, which are consortiums themselves. It has been in full operation since October 2013.
- The Atacama Pathfinder Experiment (APEX) is a 12 m (39 ft) submillimetre radio telescope installed in 2003 and inaugurated in 2005. Its design is based on the North American ALMA prototype antenna modified for single dish use. It is operated by a consortium led by the Max Planck Institute for Radio Astronomy.

=== Telescopes on Pampa la Bola ===
- The Atacama Submillimeter Telescope Experiment (ASTE) is a 10 m (33 ft) submillimetre radio telescope built by Mitsubishi Electric. It was an early prototype for the antennas of ALMA, and is operated by a consortium led by the National Astronomical Observatory of Japan. It was first built in Japan in 2000, and then was reassembled in Chile in 2002. It began regular observations in 2004.
- The NANTEN2 Observatory (NANTEN2) is 4.0 m (13.1 ft) millimeter-wavelength radio telescope operated by a consortium led by the Nagoya University. In 2004 it was moved from Las Campanas Observatory, where it had operated since 1995.

=== Telescopes on adjacent peaks ===
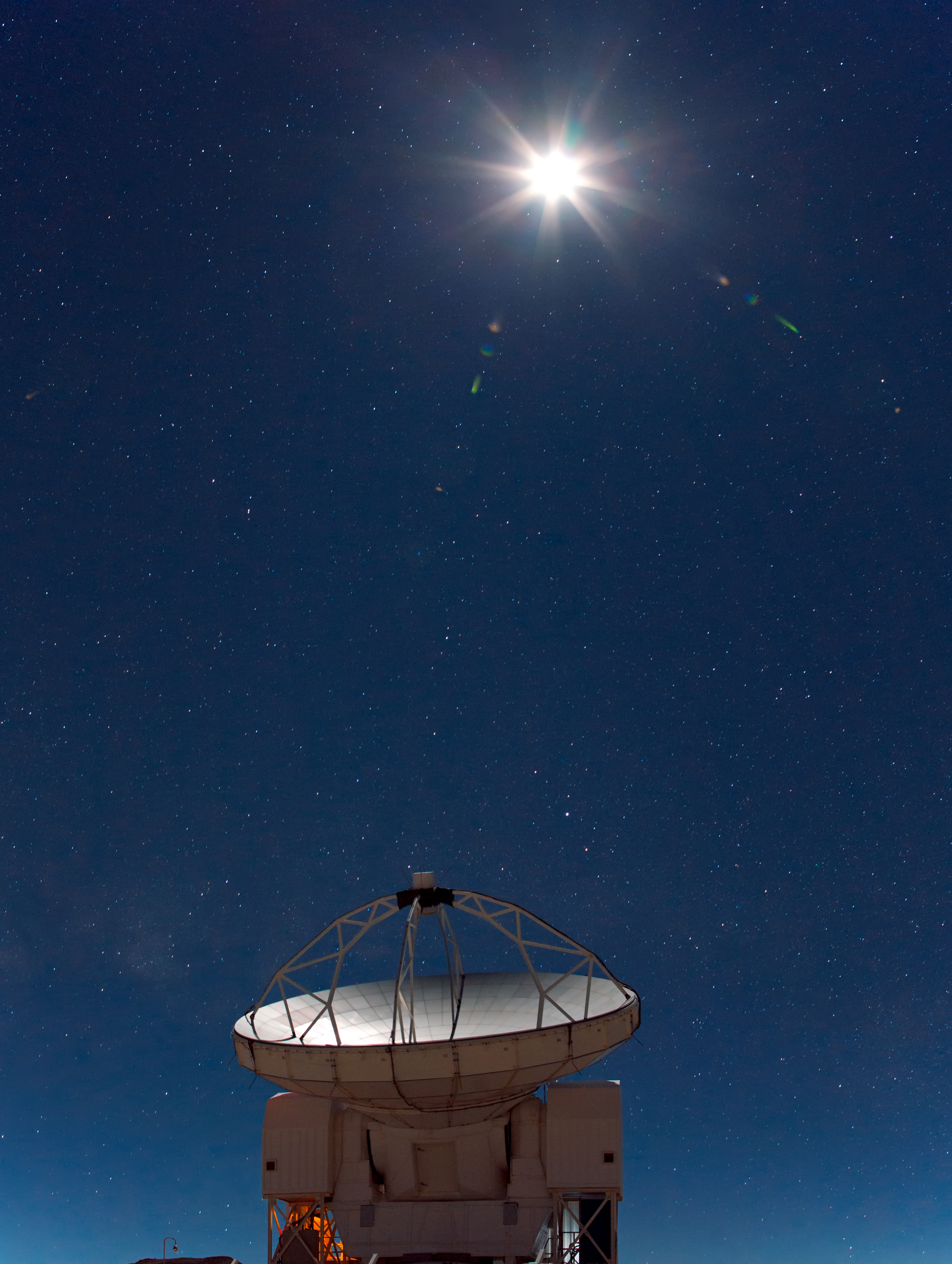
APEX Under the Moon. Starry night on the Chajnantor Plateau in the Chilean Andes

- The University of Tokyo Atacama Observatory (TAO) is a 6.5 m (21 ft) optical and infrared telescope under construction (as of 2019) on Cerro Chajnantor, which is immediately north of Llano de Chajnantor. A test facility, the miniTAO, with a 1.0 m (3.3 ft) telescope was completed in 2009. It is currently the highest permanent astronomical observatory in the world.
- The Cerro Chajnantor Atacama Telescope (CCAT) is a proposed 25 m (82 ft) submillimetre radio telescope which will be located on Cerro Chajnantor near the TAO. Originally called the Cornell Caltech Atacama Telescope earlier in the development process, it is now referred to on the project's website by the CCAT acronym. Completion was at one time expected in 2020. The CCAT project has had trouble finding funding, and construction had not begun as of 2019. The scientific collaboration has decided to build a pathfinder facility, CCAT-prime (CCAT-p), before pursuing the full CCAT. CCAT-p will be a similar type of telescope at CCAT, but much smaller, with 6 metre diameter. CCAT-p started construction in 2017 (fabrication started in late 2018) and first light is expected 2021.
- The Huan Tran Telescope (HTT) is part of a project to measure the polarization of the cosmic microwave background radiation. It is a 3.5 m (11 ft) Gregorian telescope. Attached to the telescope is the POLARBEAR experiment, which is an array of bolometers cooled to less than 1 K (−458 °F). HTT was first installed for testing at the CARMA site in 2010. It was moved to a location on Cerro Toco near the ACT in 2011 and saw first light in January 2012. It was developed by a consortium led by the University of California, Berkeley.
- The Simons Observatory is a microwave observatory consisting of a 6-m Large Aperture Telescope (LAT) and three 0.5 m Small Aperture Telescopes (SATs) with a total of 60,000 transition-edge sensor bolometers. It will conduct a wide survey of the cosmic microwave background and its linear polarization with arcminute resolution and a sensitivity an order of magnitude higher than the Planck space telescope. The SATs began observation April 2024, while the LAT's first light is expected early 2025.

=== Former telescopes ===
- The QU Imaging Experiment (QUIET) telescope was a three-element radio telescope array designed to measure the polarization of the cosmic microwave background radiation. The telescopes were custom-designed of an unusual Mizuguchi-Dragone design fitted with highly sensitive bolometers. The project, led by the University of Chicago, was installed in 2009 in the facility that previously housed the CBI array. It operated until 2010 and was dismantled in 2011.
- The Cosmic Background Imager (CBI) was a radio telescope interferometer designed to measure the intensity and polarization of the cosmic microwave background radiation. It operated with thirteen 0.9 m (3.0 ft) antennas between 1999 and 2006, and from 2006 until 2008 with 1.4 m (4.6 ft) antennas. The CBI facility was later reused by the QUIET experiment.
- The Millimeter-wave Interferometer (MINT) was a heterogenous four-element array that operated on the slopes of Cerro Toco in late 2001. The prototype instrument contained two 0.3 m (12 in) and two 0.45 m (18 in) Cassegrain reflectors. It was designed to measure the cosmic microwave background radiation.
- The Mobile Anisotropy Telescope (MAT, or MAT/TOCO) was a 0.8 m (2.6 ft) telescope that was designed to measure the anisotropy of the cosmic microwave background radiation. It originally was the gondola of the QMAP balloon-borne experiment. It operated on the slopes of Cerro Toco in late 1997 and again in late 1998.
- The Atacama Cosmology Telescope (ACT) was a 6.0 m (19.7 ft) Gregorian telescope designed to survey the sky at microwave wavelengths. It was installed on the western side of Cerro Toco in 2007 and was operated by a consortium led by Princeton University until its decommissioning in 2022.

== See also ==
- List of astronomical observatories
- List of highest astronomical observatories
- Other observatories in Chile:
  - Paranal Observatory
    - Very Large Telescope
  - Cerro Armazones Observatory
    - Extremely Large Telescope
  - La Silla Observatory
  - Cerro Tololo Inter-American Observatory
- Purico Complex, a compound volcano
