= NANTEN2 Observatory =

Southern sky observatory

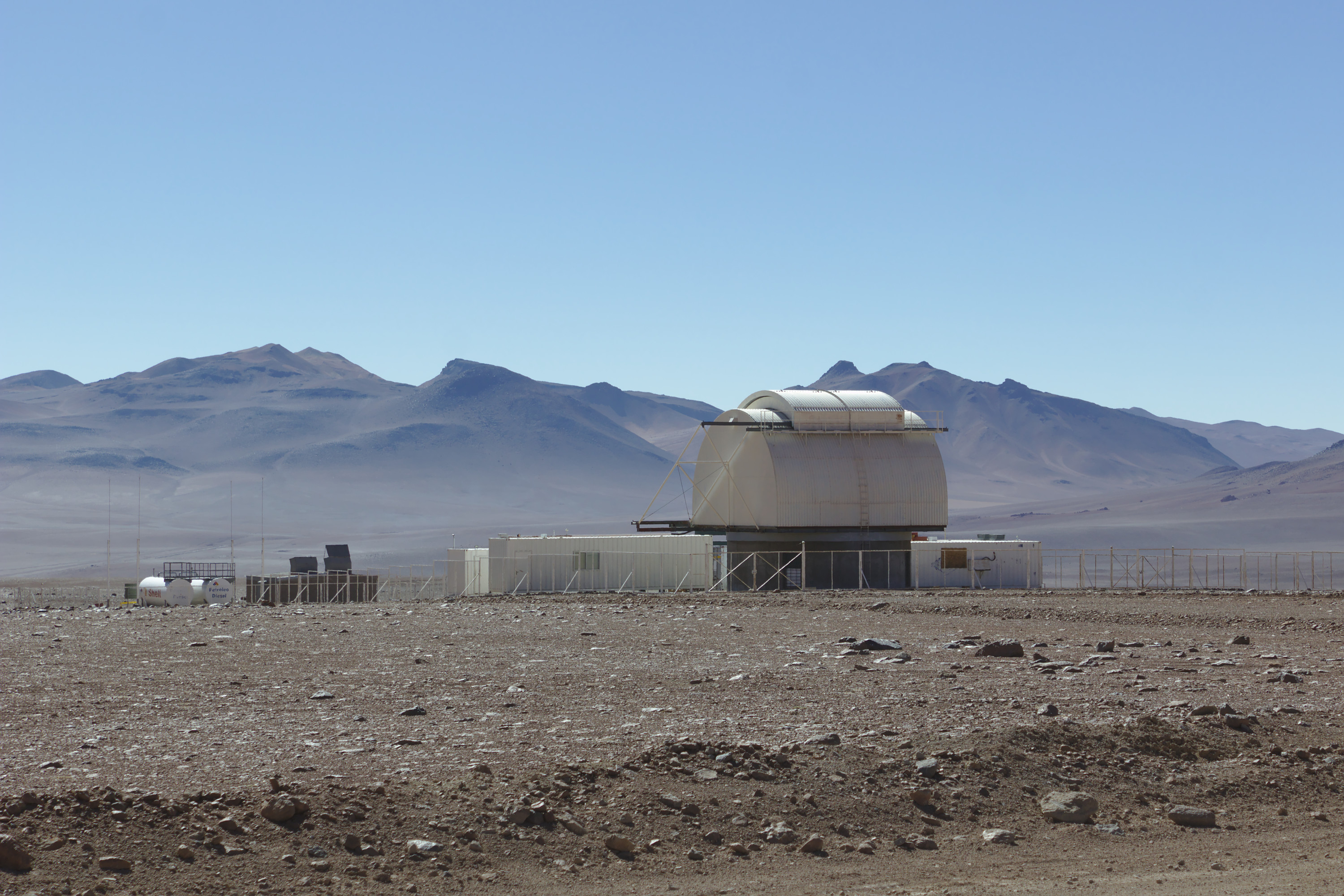
- Location(s): Atacama Desert
- Coordinates: 22°58′11″S 67°42′08″W
- Altitude: 4,800 m (15,700 ft)
- Wavelength: 0.34 mm (880 GHz)–2.73 mm (110 GHz)
- Diameter: 4 m (13 ft 1 in)
- Website: www.astro.uni-koeln.de/nanten2/
- Location of NANTEN2 Observatory
- Related media on Commons

The NANTEN2 Observatory is a southern sky observatory in the Atacama Desert of northern Chile. It is located at an altitude of 4,800 m (15,748 ft) on Pampa la Bola next to Cerro Chajnantor. The observatory is equipped with a millimeter and submillimeter wave telescope that is used for southern sky observations of atomic and molecular spectral lines in 110 GHz to 880 GHz range.

NANTEN2 is one of a number of observatories operating at Llano de Chajnantor Observatory. It is operated as a collaboration between research institutes in Japan (Nagoya University and Osaka University), South Korea (Seoul National University), Germany (KOSMA, Universität zu Köln, Argelander Institute for Astronomy at the University of Bonn), Australia (University of New South Wales, University of Adelaide, Macquarie University, Swinburne University of Technology, University of Sydney, University of Western Sydney) and Chile (Universidad de Chile).

The instrument was previously located at the Las Campanas Observatory from 1995 to 2004; it was known as the NANTEN millimeter-wavelength radio telescope back then.

== See also ==
- List of astronomical observatories
