= Atacama Submillimeter Telescope Experiment =

Astronomical experiment

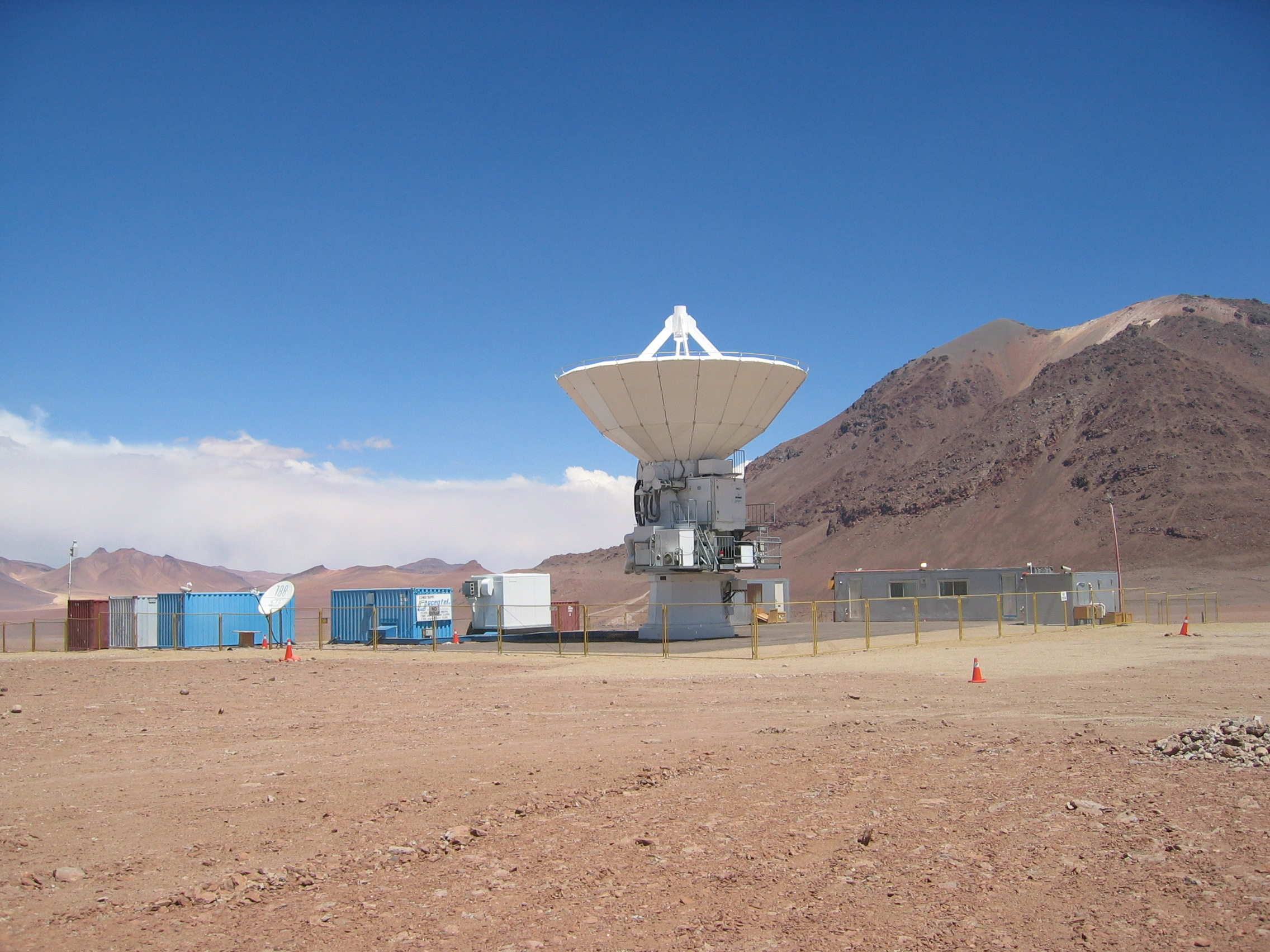
- Atacama Submillimeter Telescope Experiment
- Alternative names: ASTE
- Location(s): Atacama Desert
- Coordinates: 22°58′17″S 67°42′10″W
- Altitude: 4,800 m (15,700 ft)
- Wavelength: 0.1 mm (3.0 THz)–1.0 mm (300 GHz)
- Diameter: 10 m (32 ft 10 in)
- Website: alma.mtk.nao.ac.jp/aste/
- Location of Atacama Submillimeter Telescope Experiment
- Related media on Commons

The Atacama Submillimeter Telescope Experiment (ASTE) is a 10-meter-diameter antenna built by Mitsubishi Electric as a preprototype for ALMA.

The ASTE was deployed to its site on Pampa La Bola, near Cerro Chajnantor and the Llano de Chajnantor Observatory in northern Chile. The antenna shows excellent performance including a surface accuracy of 19 μm (0.00075 in) r.m.s. The telescope is remotely controllable from multiple sites through satellite connections and the Internet. It is operated by the National Astronomical Observatory of Japan and the University of Tokyo, Nagoya University, and Osaka Prefecture University, in cooperation with the Universidad de Chile.

Initially operating at 240 GHz using a focal-plane bolometer array, the telescope was upgraded in 2018 with a heterodyne receiver system operating at 345 GHz and 460 GHz.

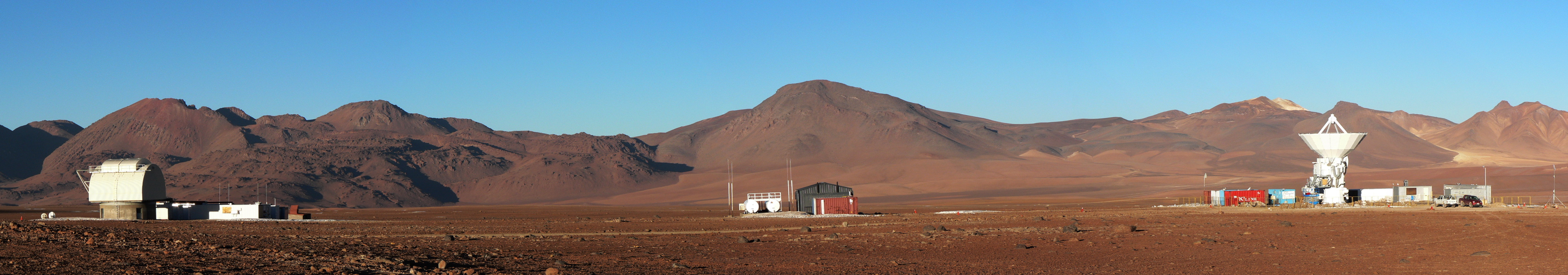

== See also ==
- List of telescope types
