= Simons Observatory =

Observatory in Chile

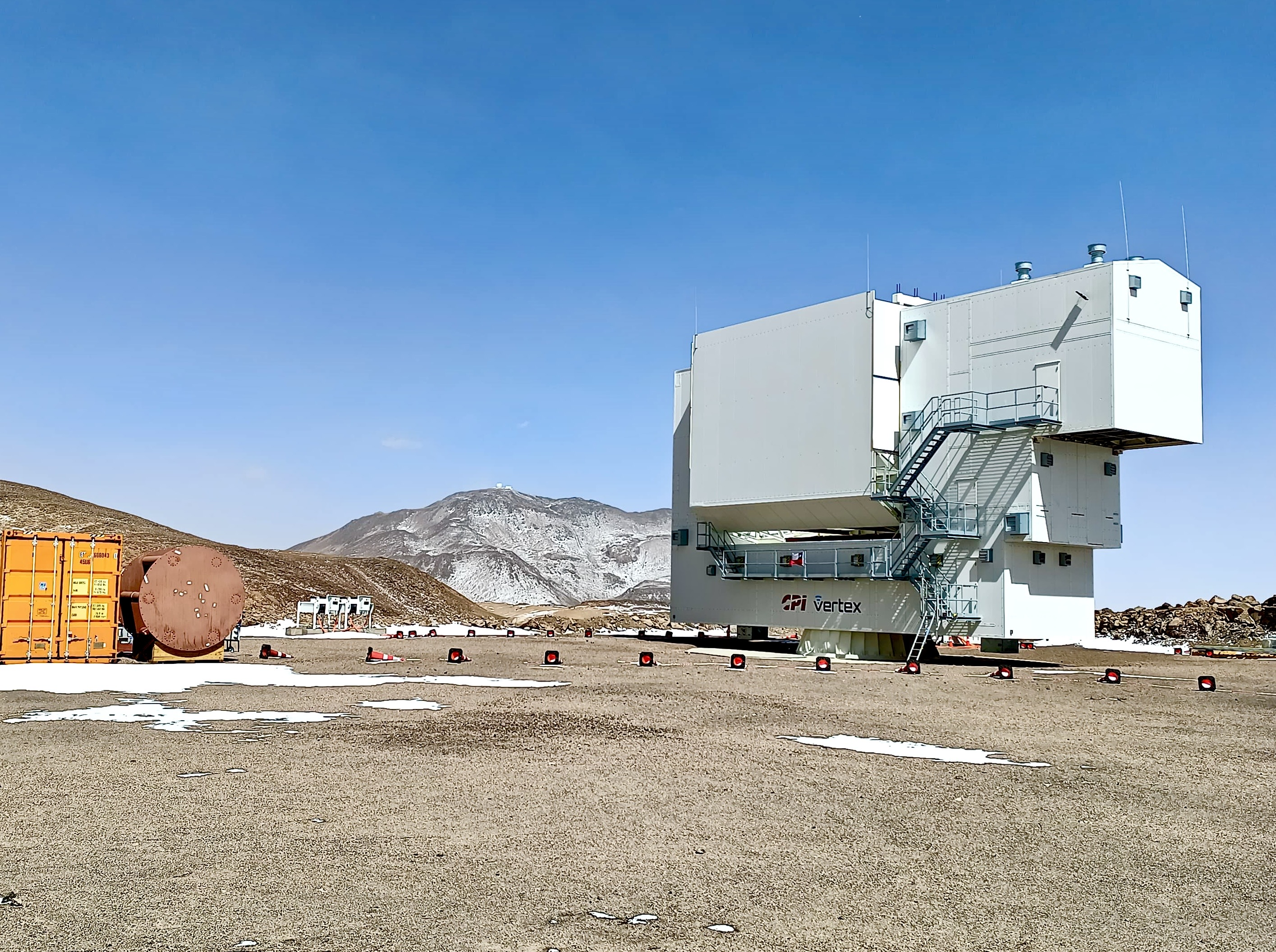
- The Large Aperture Telescope, part of the Simons Observatory
- Alternative names: Observatorio Simons
- Location(s): Atacama Desert
- Coordinates: 22°57′31″S 67°47′15″W
- Altitude: 5,200 m (17,100 ft)
- Wavelength: 27, 39, 93, 145, 225, 280 GHz (1.110, 0.769, 0.322, 0.207, 0.133, 0.107 cm)
- Number of telescopes: 4
- Diameter: 6, 0.5 m (19 ft 8 in, 1 ft 8 in)
- Website: simonsobservatory.org
- Location of Simons Observatory
- Related media on Commons

The Simons Observatory is located in the high Atacama Desert in Northern Chile inside the Chajnator Science Preserve, at an altitude of 5,200 meters (17,000 ft). The Atacama Cosmology Telescope (ACT) and the Simons Array were located nearby but these instruments have now been replaced by the current (3 small-aperture telescopes and one large-aperture telescope) telescopes of the Simons Observatory. These instruments are currently making observations of the Cosmic Microwave Background (CMB). Their goals are to study how the universe began, what it is made of, and how it evolved to its current state. The Simons Observatory shares many of the same goals of the previous experiments but takes advantage of advances in technology to make far more precise and diverse measurements. In addition, it is envisaged that many aspects of the Simons Observatory (optical designs, detector technologies, and so on) will be pathfinders for the future CMB-S4 array.

The Simons Observatory has been made possible by a combined $40.1 million grant from the Simons Foundation and a number of participating universities. The observatory is named after the foundation and its founders: Jim Simons, the hedge-fund billionaire and philanthropist who died on May 10, 2024, and his wife, Marilyn, a trained economist. The collaboration is large and multinational with over 300 scientists at over 35 institutions across the world.

The original cost of the observatory is $110 million, with $90 million from the Simons Foundation.

Currently (2025), grants from the United States' National Science Foundation, the United Kingdom, and Japan have enabled plans to expand the observatory's capabilities. In addition to doubling the number of detectors installed in the large-aperture telescope, additional small-aperture telescopes will be built. To reduce the observatories dependence on diesel generators, a large array of solar panels is being constructed.

== Science goals ==
One of the primary goals of the Simons Observatory are polarization maps of the sky with an order of magnitude better sensitivity than the Planck satellite. These will enable better measurement of cosmological parameters and will also enable a wide range of other science. Examples include gravitational lensing of the microwave background, the primordial bispectrum, and the thermal and kinematic Sunyaev-Zel'dovich effects. With delensing the large-angle polarization signal, it will be possible to measure the tensor-to-scalar ratio. The survey will also provide a legacy catalog of 16,000 galaxy clusters and more than 20,000 extragalactic sources. Details have been published in a forecasts paper.

== Frequencies ==
The CMB peaks at a frequency of 160.3 GHz. At and just below this frequency, the atmospheric opacity is low. As a result, the majority of the Simons Observatory's detectors will operate from 90 to 150 GHz.

However, critical to sensitive measurements is coverage at other frequencies in order to remove foregrounds such as emission from our galaxy. Since these foregrounds have a different spectrum to the CMB, by using higher and lower frequencies, it is possible to separate them out. The exact band centers used by the Simons Observatory are 27, 39, 93, 145, 225, and 280 GHz.

== Telescopes ==
To achieve a high-enough angular resolution for some of the science goals, a telescope with an aperture larger than about 5 meters is needed. To reduce systematic effects which become the dominant source of errors in very-low-noise maps, the Simons Observatory has built a 6-meter telescope and underilluminates the primary mirror to 5.5 meters. At the same time, other science goals require very low noise on large angular scales—something a 6-meter telescope will struggle to achieve. For this reason the Simons observatory has also built three 0.5-meter-aperture telescopes and combines the data sets in analysis.

=== The Large-Aperture Telescope (LAT) ===
The 6-meter-diameter telescope has a Crossed Dragone design. At a frequency of 90 GHz, it has a field-of-view over 7.8 degrees. It was built by Vertex Antennentechnik in Germany. This telescope is of an identical design to the higher frequency CCAT-prime telescope which is still under construction.

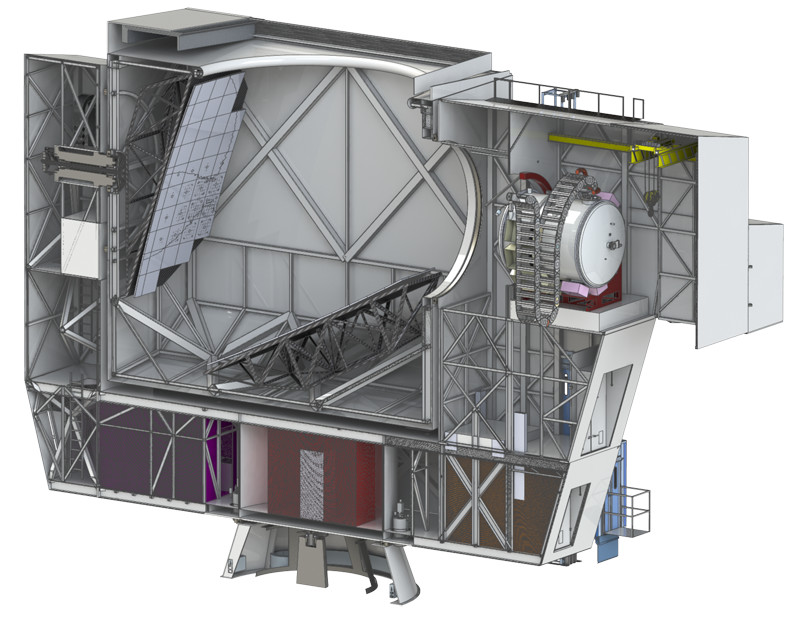
A cross section through the Simons Observatory Large Aperture Telescope showing the mirrors housed in the elevation structure. The white cylinder on the right is the 2.4 meter diameter cryostat.

The detectors on the LAT are housed in a single large cryostat over 2.4 meters in diameter. This can house up to 13 optics tubes consisting of three cooled silicon lenses (to refocus light from the secondary focus of the telescope onto the detectors) and a Lyot stop at an image of the primary mirror (to prevent stray light from the telescope structure reaching the detectors). Currently, of these 13 tubes, one operates at 27 & 39 GHz, four operate at 93 & 145 GHz, two at 225 & 280 GHz, and the rest will be populated within 2 years. This cryostat is one of the largest millimeter-wave astronomical cameras ever built.

=== The Small-Aperture Telescopes (SATs) ===
The small-aperture telescopes are refracting telescopes with 3 aspheric silicon lenses and a rotating half wave plate. Each telescope has a field-of-view of over 35 degrees. Overcoming systematic effects, such as picking up signals from the ground in sidelobes, is critical to the measurement of the very largest angular scales, so each telescope has co-moving screens and is mounted inside a fixed ground screen that reflects diffraction from the co-moving screens to the sky.

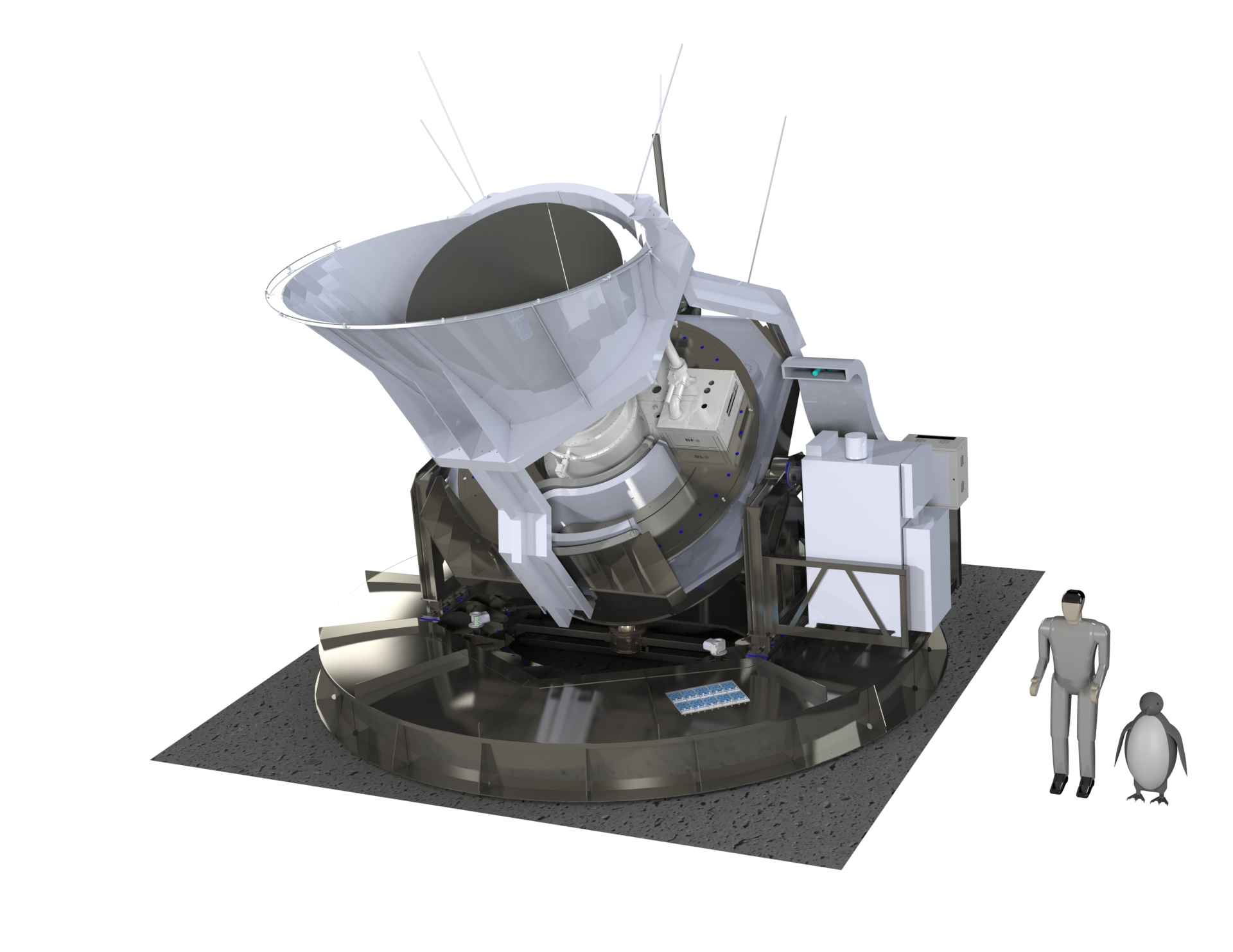
The SAT on its mount showing the comoving shield and the electronics to readout the detectors and the cryogenics needed to cool them to below 100 mK. The fixed ground shield is not shown.

== Detectors ==
The Simons Observatory will use transition-edge sensor (TES) bolometers. These devices will be cooled to 100 mK inside cryostats using pulse tube coolers to cool to below 4 Kelvin and dilution refrigerators for the final 1 K and 100 mK cooling stages. There will be approximately 60,000 bolometers, with roughly half on the LAT and the rest on the SATs. To readout the detectors, a microwave multiplexing scheme used. In the future expansion of the observatory, some TES bolometers will be replaced by mKIDS.

== Measurements ==
Two of the SAT telescopes began taking measurements in April 2024, in time for Dr. Simons's 86th birthday on April 25. The third SAT started observing in June 2024. The first observations with the large-aperture telescope were made in March 2025.

== See also ==
- List of astronomical observatories
