= John Ruhl (physicist) =

American physicist

John Ruhl is Connecticut Professor in Physics and Astronomy at Case Western Reserve University.

== Education ==
Ruhl received a BS in physics from the University of Michigan in 1987 and a Ph.D. in physics from Princeton in 1993. While a graduate student at Princeton, Ruhl, along with several other graduate students, co-authored the text Princeton Problems in Physics. His doctoral dissertation, A search for anisotropy in the Cosmic Microwave Background Radiation, was supervised by Mark Dragovan.

== Research ==
Ruhl is an experimentalist in cosmology. He studies the cosmic microwave background radiation and has been principal or co-principal investigator on the Spider CMB, South Pole Telescope, ACBAR and Boomerang experiments.

== Recognition ==
Ruhl was named a Fellow of the American Physical Society (APS) in 2005, after a nomination from the APS Division of Astrophysics, "for his fundamental experimental contributions to the study of the cosmic microwave background radiation". In 2016, Case gave him their John S. Diekhoff Award for Distinguished Graduate Student Mentoring.
