= Degree Angular Scale Interferometer =

Telescope installed in Antarctica

- Location: South Pole, Antarctic Treaty area
- Coordinates: 89°59′29″S 44°30′00″W
- Altitude: 2,800 m (9,200 ft)
- Wavelength: 0.83 cm (36 GHz)–1.2 cm (25 GHz)
- Diameter: 20 cm (7.9 in)
- Website: astro.uchicago.edu/dasi/
- Location within Antarctica

The Degree Angular Scale Interferometer (DASI) was a telescope installed at the U.S. National Science Foundation's Amundsen–Scott South Pole Station in Antarctica. It was a 13-element interferometer operating between 26 and 36 GHz (Ka band) in ten bands. The instrument is similar in design to the Cosmic Background Imager (CBI) and the Very Small Array (VSA). In 2001 The DASI team announced the most detailed measurements of the temperature, or power spectrum of the cosmic microwave background (CMB). These results contained the first detection of the 2nd and 3rd acoustic peaks in the CMB, which were important evidence for inflation theory. This announcement was done in conjunction with the BOOMERanG and MAXIMA experiment. In 2002 the team reported the first detection of polarization anisotropies in the CMB.

In 2005, the vacant DASI mount was used for the QUaD experiment, which was another CMB imager focussed on the E-mode spectrum. In 2010, the DASI mount was again repurposed for the Keck Array, which also measures CMB polarization anisotropy.

== Introduction ==
The CMB was created when the universe was about 380,000 years old, when the opaque plasma fog which existed after the Big Bang began to recombine into hydrogen atoms and allowed photons to travel freely through space. This radiation has since been redshifted by the expansion of the universe and can be seen faintly in the microwave part of the electromagnetic spectrum. In 1992 it was observed that there are very slight anisotropies in the effective temperature of the CMB, and the DASI telescope was outfitted to precisely measure these temperature anisotropies and then to detect polarization; the first to look at the polarization of the CMB. The ΛCDM (dark energy and cold dark matter) theory, regarded as the standard model of cosmology, predicted polarization of the CMB due to the scattering effects of the first atoms in the universe. Project leader John Carlstrom said that if polarization had not been found, astrophysicists would have to reject all their interpretations of recent data.

== Construction ==
=== Location ===
The DASI telescope was set up over the 1999–2000 austral summer, on the inner of the two towers of the Martin A.Pomerantz Observatory at the Amundsen–Scott South Pole Station 0.7 km from the geographic south pole. The southern polar site is an exceptional location for this sort of telescope because of the extremely favourable atmospheric conditions. The high altitude and extreme dryness means the air is thinner and contains much less water vapour than other climates, which is important as water is a good absorber of microwave radiation and blocks a portion of the CMB signal. Also, the sun is only visible for six months of the year negating the need to shield the telescope from it during that time.

Other telescopes which have been or are at the station include the Viper, Python, and the South Pole Telescope. See the Amundsen–Scott South Pole Station article for a list of astrophysics experiments at the site.

=== Design ===
The DASI was a compact interferometer made up of 13 small telescope elements in a pattern with three lines of symmetry. Each of the 13 telescopes had a 20-centimetre (7.9 in) lensed corrugated horn, with a corrugated shroud to reduce crosstalk between the antennae. Each of the telescopes had a high-electron-mobility transistor (HEMT) amplifier working at the frequencies 26–36 GHz (Ka band), cryogenically cooled to about 10 K. The receiver noise temperatures ranged from 15K–26 K at band centre, and 30 K at the edges. The overall system temperature reached about 26 K.

For the polarization observations, the telescope was reconfigured during the 2000–2001 austral summer with achromatic polarizers, providing the telescope with sensitivity in all four Stokes parameters.

The telescope mount was of an altitude-azimuth (altazimuth) design, with a counterbalanced gear and pinion elevation drive, that gave great stability when tracking and pointing. The mount had a heavy box steel construction, which was necessary to ensure stability of the 35,000 pounds (16,000 kg) mass of the telescope.

The telescope was designed to provide the most reliable results possible by minimising any factor which could affect the images produced, for example the 11-metre (36 ft) tower where the telescope was situated was mechanically isolated to prevent vibrations from the rest of the building affecting the equipment. The telescope was inside a large upside-down dome which served as a ground shield to minimise interfering thermal radiation from the earth.

To avoid human exposure to the −60 °C (−76 °F) temperatures of the Antarctic winter, there was a canopy between the telescope and the ground shield which created a sealed cabin allowing access by ladder to the instruments without leaving the safety of the building.

The design of the DASI was very similar to that of the VSA and the CBI. The electronic equipment behind the CBI and DASI were actually identical as were the 26–36 GHz frequencies operated at. However the CBI was designed for smaller angular scales, so it had a greater resolution over a smaller area of the sky, and so had 0.9 m dishes instead of DASI's 20 cm horns. The VSA was also similar in concept and operated at the same frequency, but operated at smaller angular resolutions of 0.2–3°.

=== Funding ===
The project was funded by the National Science Foundation (NSF) office of polar programs, first through the Centre for Astrophysical Research in Antarctica and then directly through the office. It was additionally supported by the Centre for Cosmological Physics in Chicago.

== Results ==
DASI made its first observations over 97 days during the 2000 austral winter, measuring temperature anisotropies of the CMB in 32 roughly adjacent circular areas of the sky, each 3.4° in diameter. These observations were highly sensitive, typically at an rms precision of 10 μK. After another set of measurements in 2001 the team reported the results the first measurements of the 2nd and 3rd acoustic peaks in the CMB's power spectrum, the 1st had been discovered by earlier experiments MAT/TOCO, BOOMERanG and MAXIMA. The cuts of DASI's data were done with a strict "jackknife" test which removed data which was gathered when certain parameters were exceeded, for example if the sun rose more than 5° over the horizon, or there was a large offset or excessive noise in the data suggesting a hardware glitch. This is a standard practise which sacrifices some accuracy for improved reliability.

In December 2002, the DASI team reported the discovery of polarization anisotropies in the CMB. This followed 2 years and 271 days of observations of two of the previous 3.4° diameter FWHM areas. 22 days of data was cut.

The experiment was continued through the austral winter of 2003, and the new data confirmed the conclusions of the previous two years.

=== Conclusions ===
The 2001 discovery of the 2nd and 3rd acoustic peaks in the CMB was an important piece of evidence for the inflation theory of the expansion of the universe. According to the theory, acoustic peaks are caused by the oscillations of matter during the Big Bang, which should be measurable as one main frequency or tone, with a series of overtones or harmonics. The 1st acoustic peak represents the main tone, and the 2nd and 3rd peaks discovered by DASI represent the 2nd and 3rd harmonics. These readings can also be used to measure the baryon density of the early universe, and these measurements provided evidence for the existence of dark matter and dark energy. This has since become the ΛCDM Standard Model of Cosmology.

From the more recent polarization results scientists could have "high confidence" of the presence of E-modes in the CMB, which added to the evidence supporting the ΛCDM Standard Model of Cosmology; the data is also helpful to understanding the mass distribution of the early universe. The temperature anisotropies revealed the existence of formations of matter in the early universe, and the polarization revealed how these formations were moving. The developments in interferometric technique achieved by this project were also thought to be helpful for future projects seeking to discover B-modes as evidence for gravitational waves. The DASI however, was not large enough to be useful in the search for B-modes, and having accomplished what it had been designed for, was decommissioned.
