= Very Small Array =

Radio telescope in the Canary Islands

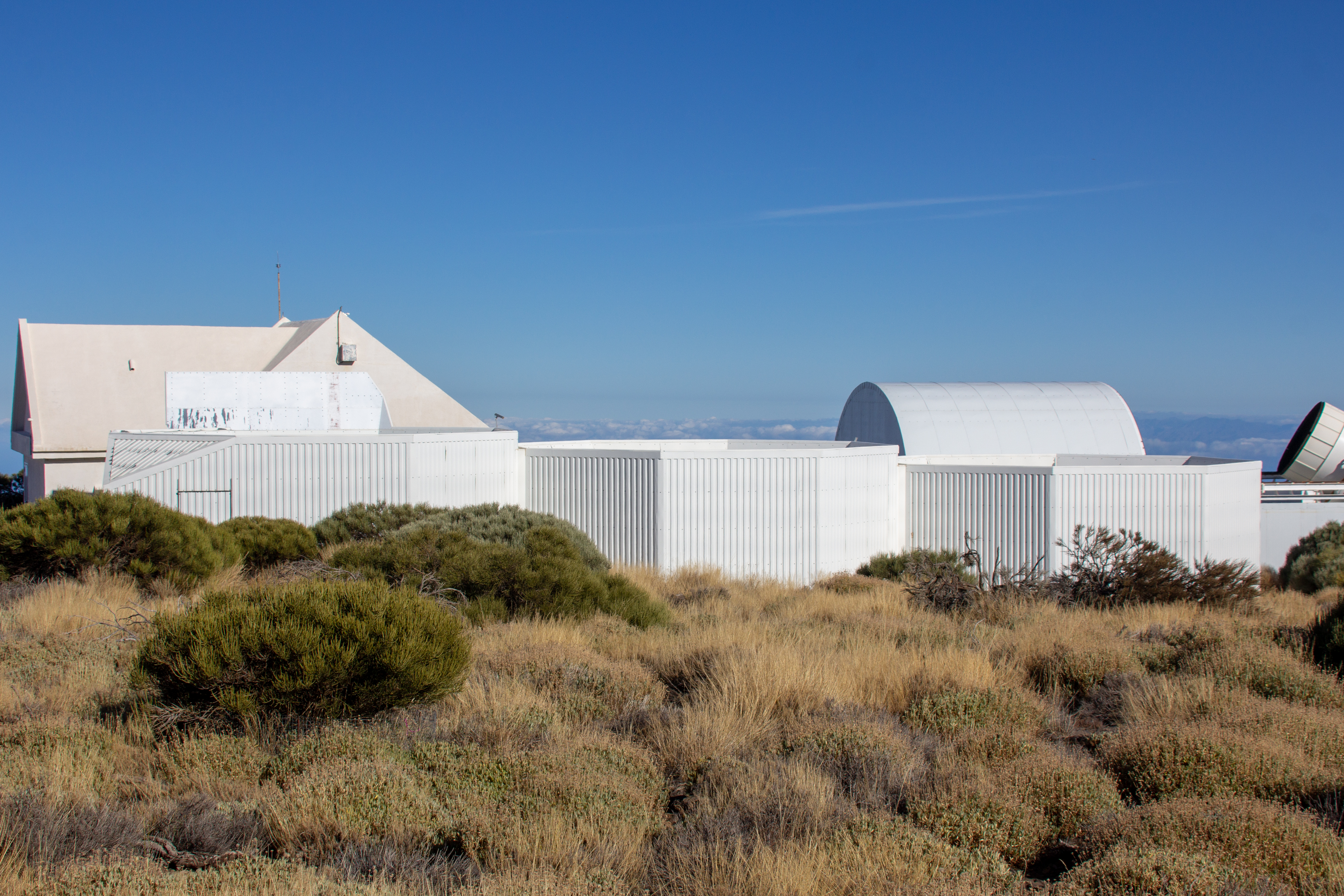
- The VSA ground shields
- Location: Tenerife, Atlantic Ocean, international waters
- Coordinates: 28°18′02″N 16°30′37″W
- Organization: Cavendish Astrophysics Group; Instituto de Astrofísica de Canarias; Jodrell Bank Observatory; University of Cambridge
- Altitude: 2,500 m (8,200 ft)
- Wavelength: 0.83 cm (36 GHz)–1.2 cm (25 GHz)
- Website: www.jb.man.ac.uk/tech/technology/vsa.html
- Location within Canary Islands
- Related media on Commons

The Very Small Array (VSA) was a 14-element interferometric radio telescope operating between 26 and 36 GHz that is used to study the cosmic microwave background radiation. It was a collaboration between the University of Cambridge, University of Manchester and the Instituto de Astrofisica de Canarias (Tenerife), and was located at the Observatorio del Teide on Tenerife. The array was built at the Mullard Radio Astronomy Observatory by the Cavendish Astrophysics Group and Jodrell Bank Observatory, and was funded by PPARC (now STFC). The design was strongly based on the Cosmic Anisotropy Telescope.

The telescope was comparable in terms of capabilities to several other CMB experiments, including the balloon-based BOOMERanG and MAXIMA, and the ground-based DASI and CBI.

== Design ==
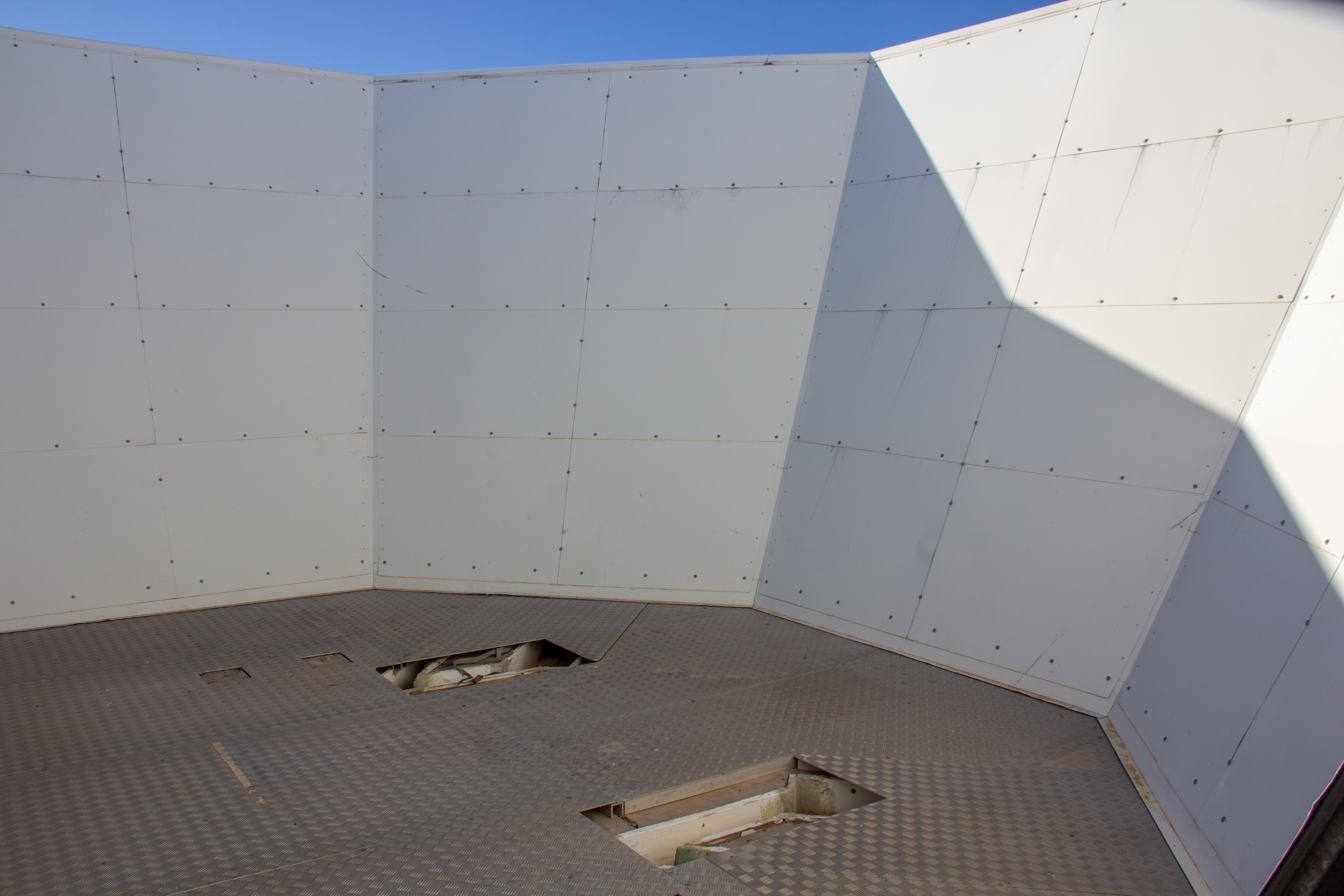
The ground shield that used to hold the VSA

The telescope consists of 14 elements (yielding 91 baselines), each of which have a horn reflector antenna focusing astrophysical signals into individual receivers (pseudomorphic HFET amplifiers, with a system temperature around 25 K and a physical temperature of 12 K, based on an NRAO design). The separate elements are combined using a correlator to form an aperture synthesis array. The elements are mounted on a tip-table, which is capable of tracking the sky and can tilt up to 35 degrees from the zenith.

The telescope has been used in three different configurations – "compact", "extended" and "super-extended", each of which differ in the separation distance between the elements (the difference between compact and extended is a factor of 2.25), and the size of the antennas. While the compact array has antennas 143 mm in diameter, the extended array uses 322 mm diameter antennas. This means that the compact array has a primary beam of 4.5 degrees, and a resolution of 30 arcminutes (multipoles between 100 and 800), while the extended array has a primary beam of 2 degrees, a resolution of 12 arcminutes and can hence observe multipoles between 250 and 1500. The extended array is also a factor of 5 more sensitive than the compact array. The super-extended array will be able to measure multipoles up to 3000, and has 550 mm antenna mirrors. The front-end amplifiers were also upgraded.

The telescope can be tuned to frequencies between 26 and 36 GHz, with 1.5 GHz bandwidth, meaning that the telescope can carry out observations at different frequencies.

It also includes two 3.7 m radio telescopes, also working at 30 GHz, which are dedicated to monitoring foreground sources. These source subtraction dishes were upgraded to more accurate ones following the first series of observations, to allow the monitoring of much weaker sources than previously can.

Both the source subtractor dishes, and the VSA itself, are surrounded by large metal ground shields.

As the VSA is an interferometer, it directly measures the angular power spectrum of the CMB, rather than having to construct a map of the sky first.

== Results ==
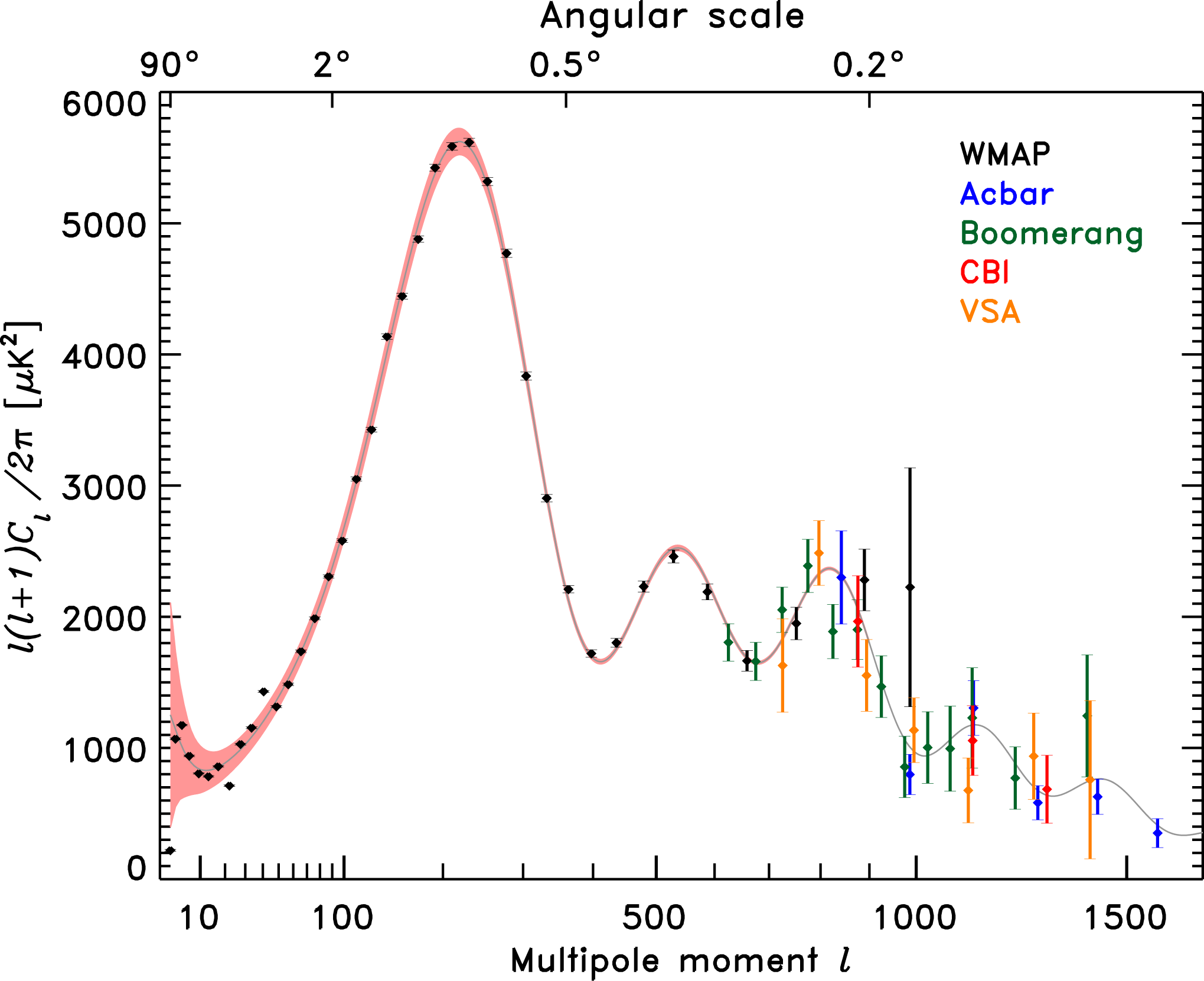
The power spectrum of the cosmic microwave background radiation temperature anisotropy in terms of the angular scale (or multipole moment). The data shown come from the WMAP (2006), Acbar (2004) Boomerang (2005), CBI (2004) and Very Small Array (2004) instruments.

The fields observed with the VSA were chosen to minimize the amount of bright radio sources and large clusters in the field (the latter to avoid the Sunyaev-Zel'dovich effect), as well as to avoid contamination by emission from our galaxy. The radio point sources present in the VSA fields were observed with the Ryle Telescope at 15 GHz, then monitored by the VSA source subtracters during the VSA observations.

In the compact array configuration, the telescope observed three 7×7 degree areas of the sky to high precision in an observing session between August 2000 and August 2001. These observations were taken at the highest frequency of the telescope, centered at 34 GHz, to reduce foreground contamination. Another larger area of the sky was also observed, though with lower precision. The data from these observations were reduced independently at all three involved institutions. The results from these observations were published in a series of four papers in 2003; those by Watson et al., Taylor et al., Scott et al. and Rubino-Martin et al. (see References below). The key results were the power spectra of the Cosmic Microwave Background between multipoles of 150 and 900, and the resulting limits on cosmological parameters when combined with data from observations from other experiments.

The second observing session ran between September 2001 and July 2003, and was using the extended array. The first results from the extended array were published as a Letter in 2003, simultaneously with the first four publications, using data taken up until April 2002. The sections of the sky observed were located within the previously observed fields, with the measurements being both more accurate and in greater detail. The result was an improved power spectrum of the CMB, going out to a multipole of 1400, and refined cosmological parameters. The second set of results were published in 2004, and consisted of the original observations plus more observations taken in the same regions of the sky, as well as observations in three new regions. This yielded measurements of the CMB power spectra out to l of 1500 much more accurately than previously, and more accurate cosmological parameter estimates.

Observations with the VSA continued until the end of August 2008, using the Super-Extended configuration. Also, the Ryle Telescope has been upgraded to detect lower flux point sources, and the OCRA receiver on a telescope in Poland will be used to more accurately subtract the point sources.

First results.	Second results.	Third results.
The Very Small Array's measurements of the CMB power spectra. From left to right: from first observations, the first results from the second observing session and the final results from the second observing session.

== See also ==
- Very Large Array
