= QUaD =

Ground-based cosmic microwave background polarization experiment

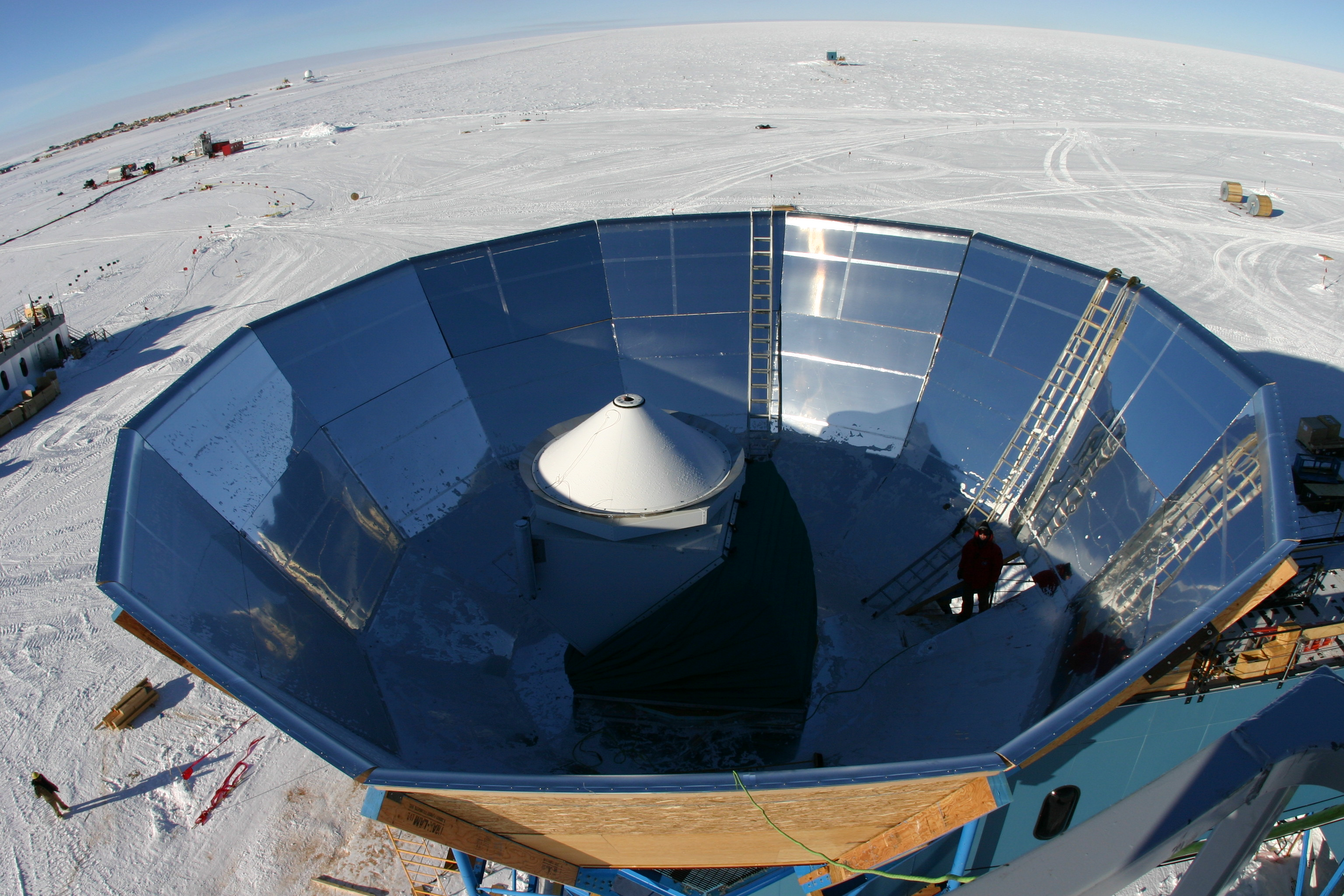
- A photograph of the QUaD telescope inside its groundshield taken from a crane above the telescope.
- Alternative names: QUEST at DASI
- Location: Antarctic Treaty area
- Coordinates: 89°59′29″S 44°30′00″W
- Location within Antarctica
- Related media on Commons

QUaD, an acronym for QUEST at DASI, was a ground-based cosmic microwave background (CMB) polarization experiment at the South Pole. QUEST (Q and U Extragalactic Sub-mm Telescope) was the original name attributed to the bolometer detector instrument, while DASI is a famous CMB interferometry experiment credited with the first detection of CMB polarization. QUaD used the existing DASI mechanical infrastructure but replaced the DASI interferometric array with a bolometer detector at the end of a cassegrain optical system. The mount has housed the Keck Array since 2011.

== See also ==
- Cosmic microwave background radiation
- Cosmic microwave background experiments
