= H1426+428 =

BL Lac object located in the constellation Boötes

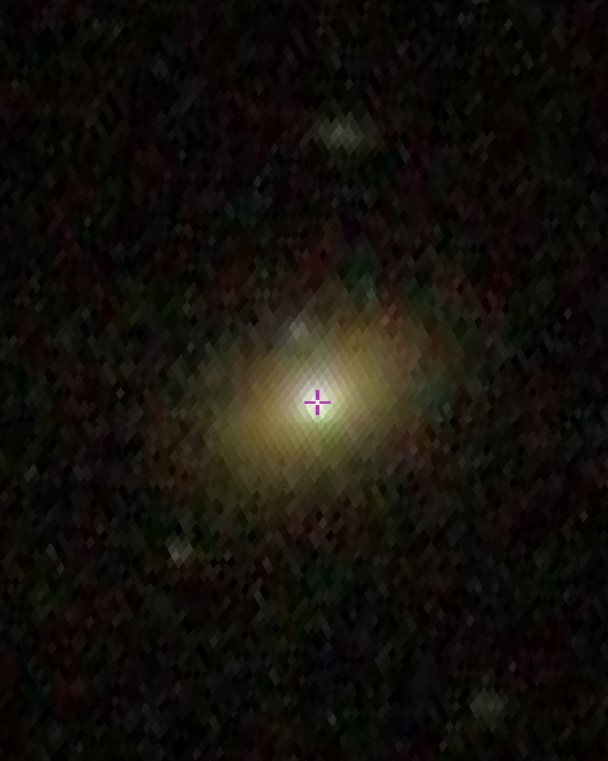
- The BL Lac object H1426+428.

Observation data (J2000.0 epoch)
- Constellation: Boötes
- Right ascension: 14^{h} 28^{m} 32.60^{s}
- Declination: +42° 40′ 20.97″
- Redshift: 0.129265
- Heliocentric radial velocity: 38,753 km/s
- Distance: 1.911 Gly (585.91 Mpc)
- Apparent magnitude (V): 16.45
- Apparent magnitude (B): 16.95

Characteristics
- Type: BL LAC

Other designations
- 1ES 1426+428, LEDA 2203750, 4FGL J1428.5+4240, 1ES 1426+42.8, TeV J1428+426, 1RXS J142832.6+424028, RX J1428.5+4240

H1426+428 also known as 1ES 1426+428, is a high-frequency peaked BL Lacertae object (HBL) located in the constellation of Boötes. It is located at a relatively high redshift of (z) 0.129, and was discovered in 1984 by astronomers who presented a catalogue of X-ray sources taken with the HEAO 1 satellite.

H1426+428 is classified as a blazar. It is also a distant source of TeV gamma rays. It has low power and a synchrotron peak that is above 100 KeV. Furthermore, H1426+428 is possibly hosted in an elliptical galaxy and is luminous in X-ray bands. It has a 2-6 keV luminosity of ~10^{44} erg s^{−1}.

The gamma emission in H1426+428 is found to have an average flux. Its spectrum is very steep and shows a differential spectral index of γ = -3.60 ± 0.57, when observed by the Cosmic Anisotropy Telescope (CAT) in Very High energy gamma ray bands between 1998 and 2000. This steep spectrum is mainly contributed by the absorption of gamma rays in the intergalactic medium or by diffused cosmic infrared background.

In 2002, H1426+428 exhibited variability in the 3-24 keV X-ray spectra. However in 2006, it was in a period of X-ray inactivity, showing no gamma rays, when observed by CELESTE Cherenkov telescope . The Tev activity in H1426+428 only increased just before 2008, with it experiencing flare activity for four days in 2009. A long-term X-ray flare was detected in H1426+428 in January 2021 by the X-ray telescope onboard Neil Gehrels Swift Observatory. This was followed by a very high energy gamma ray flux in March 2021.

H1426+428 has a compact radio core with a ~ 17 mJy flux density. In additional, it has a faint radio jet extending towards northwest with a project position angle of -25°. There is also a faint radio halo that is surrounding the radio core as well but it has weak radio and optical polarization.
