= Cosmic Background Imager =

Astronomical interferometer at Llano de Chajnantor Observatory in Chile (1999–2008)

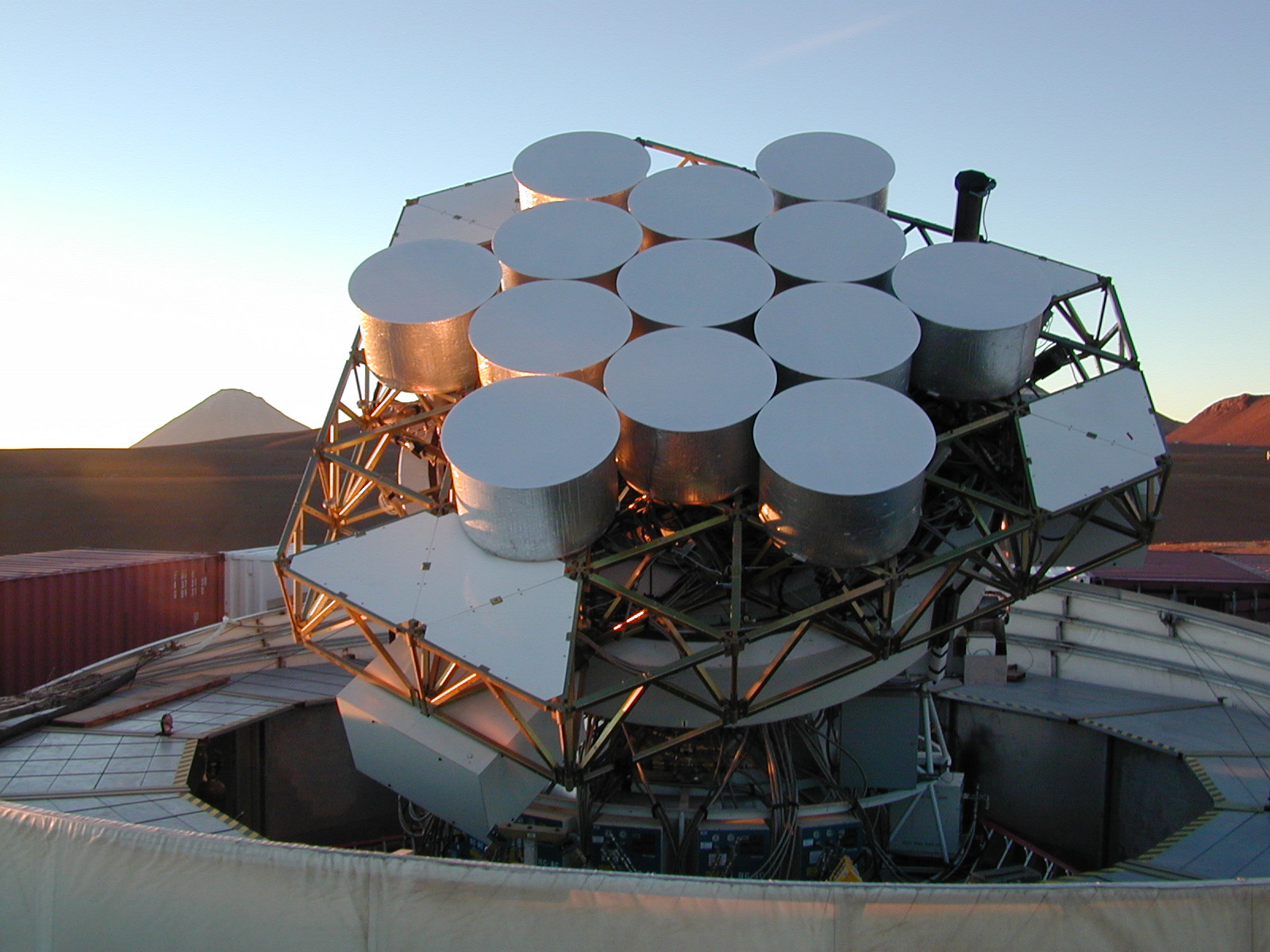
- The CBI Telescope
- Location(s): Chile
- Coordinates: 23°2′S 67°46′W
- Location of Cosmic Background Imager
- Related media on Commons

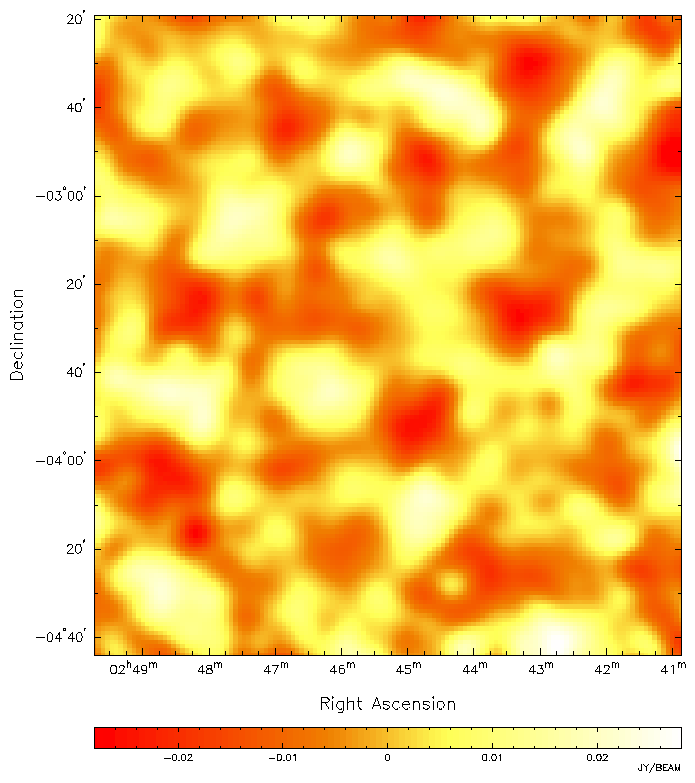
CMB as measured by the CBI experiment

The Cosmic Background Imager (or CBI) was a 13-element astronomical interferometer perched at an elevation of 5,080 metres (16,700 feet) at Llano de Chajnantor Observatory in the Chilean Andes. It started operations in 1999 to study the cosmic microwave background (CMB) radiation and ran until 2008.

== History ==
CBI conducted measurements at frequencies between 26 and 36 GHz in ten bands of 1 GHz bandwidth. It had a resolution of better than 1/10 of a degree. (In comparison, the pioneering COBE satellite, which produced the first detection of fluctuations in the microwave background in 1992, had a resolution of about 7 degrees.) Among the key findings of the CBI is the fact that fluctuations which have a small size on the sky are weaker than fluctuations which have a large size on the sky, which confirmed earlier theoretical predictions. More technically, CBI was the first experiment to detect intrinsic anisotropy in the microwave background on mass scales of galaxy clusters; it provided the first detection of the Silk damping tail; it found a hint of excess power at high-l multipoles (CBI-excess) than expected from the ΛCDM model; and it detected fluctuations in the polarization of the microwave background obtaining the first detailed E-mode polarization spectrum providing evidence that it is out of phase with the total intensity mode spectrum.

The CBI was built at the California Institute of Technology, and employed sensitive radio amplifiers from the National Radio Astronomy Observatory; two similar experiments are the Very Small Array, operated on the island of Tenerife, and the Degree Angular Scale Interferometer, operated in Antarctica. Both of these experiments used radio interferometry to measure CMB fluctuations at lower resolution over larger areas of the sky. Another experiment operated from Antarctica, the Arcminute Cosmology Bolometer Array Receiver, used total power (bolometric) detection and a single antenna at higher frequency and similar angular resolution to obtain results comparable to the CBI. The confluence of these and other CMB experiments employing different measurement techniques in recent years is a great triumph of observational cosmology.

CBI was a collaboration among a number of institutions in the US and Europe. It still closely collaborates with Chilean institutions Universidad de Chile and Universidad de Concepción through the Chajnantor Observatory.

In 2006, new 1.4 m antennas replaced the old 0.9 m dishes for more high-resolution studies in total intensity mode. During this stage, CBI was called CBI-2.

In June 2008, CBI-2 stopped the observations and the 13-antenna instrument was removed from its mount. The new QUIET telescope instrument was installed in August 2008 on the CBI mount, replacing CBI-2 .

== See also ==
- List of telescope types
- Very Small Array
- Wilkinson Microwave Anisotropy Probe
- Degree Angular Scale Interferometer
