= QMAP =

1996 experiment

- Website: www.physics.princeton.edu/cosmology/qmap/

QMAP was a balloon experiment to measure the anisotropy of the cosmic microwave background (CMB). It flew twice in 1996, and was used with an interlocking scan of the skies to produce CMB maps at angular scales between 0.7° and 9°.

The gondola was later used for ground-based observations in the MAT/TOCO experiment.

== See also ==
- Cosmic microwave background experiments
- Observational cosmology
