= Horizons: Exploring the Universe =

Astronomy textbook

- Hypernovae, Gamma Rays and Black Holes
- Author: Michael A. Seeds
- Original title: Ice Volcanoes on a Frozen Moon
- Cover artist: Irene Morris (designer) Precision Graphics: Enceladus (large background image): By artist David Seal, NASA. Pluto: Artist's concept of Kuiper Belt Object 2003; Eris: NASA, ESA, and A. Schaller (for STScI). Hypernovae: Colliding binary neutron stars: NASA/D. Berry. First Galaxies: Milky Way: © Myron Jay Dorf/Corbis
- Language: English
- Subject: Astronomy
- Genre: Non-fiction, textbook
- Publisher: Brooks Cole/ Cengage Learning
- Publication date: 1993
- Publication place: United States
- Media type: Print (Paperback)
- Pages: 516
- ISBN: 0-495-11963-6
- OCLC: 226106230

Horizons: Exploring the Universe is an astronomy textbook that was written by Michael A. Seeds and Dana E. Backman. It is in its 14th edition (as of 2019), and is used in some colleges as a guide book for introductory astronomy classes. It covers all major ideas in astronomy, from the apparent magnitude scale, to the Cosmic Microwave Background Radiation, to gamma ray bursts.

== Reception ==
Henry Albers, a professor at Vassar College, penned a mixed review of the book's first edition. He praised it for having "accurately presented" content in which he could not find clear mistakes. Albers found that "the diagrams and photographs complement the text material quite well". However, he said, "Because the text is introductory in nature it would have been helpful to have omitted some material; the concept density is quite high." He found that the book's second chapter contained enough content to occupy nearly 50% of a semester.

Edward C. Olson, a professor at the University of Illinois Urbana-Champaign, found the second edition of the book to be "exceptionally easy to use in a one-semester non-mathematical course". He thought it was "written in a clear direct style that avoids the slightly 'cute' approach taken by a few modern texts." The Paris Observatory's L. M. Celnikier reviewed the book's fourth edition. In a mixed review, he said, "Its packaging is of a very high standard; the drawings are clear, the photographs to the point (and beautifully reproduced), the text well planned and presented" but found that "certain details betray signs of sloppy thinking".
