= Viper telescope =

Antarctic telescope to view cosmic background radiation

- Location: Antarctic Treaty area
- Coordinates: 90°00′S 139°16′W
- Wavelength: 40 GHz (7.5 mm)
- First light: 1998
- Decommissioned: November 2005
- Diameter: 2 m (6 ft 7 in)
- Location within Antarctica

The Viper telescope was a 2-metre telescope used to observe the submillimetre band from the South Pole. This telescope was located at the Center for Astrophysical Research, also known as (CARA), in the Amundsen-Scott station in Antarctica. The project was operated by many scientists; the team leader, Dr. Jeffrey Peterson, is a Carnegie Mellon astrophysicist.

Viper was mainly used to view Cosmic microwave background. First operational in 1998, the telescope was used to help scientists prove or disprove the Big Crunch theory. The telescope was at the time also one of the most powerful of its kind. Previous cosmic background telescopes were smaller and less sensitive. It was decommissioned in 2005.
