= Cosmic Anisotropy Telescope =

Interferometer

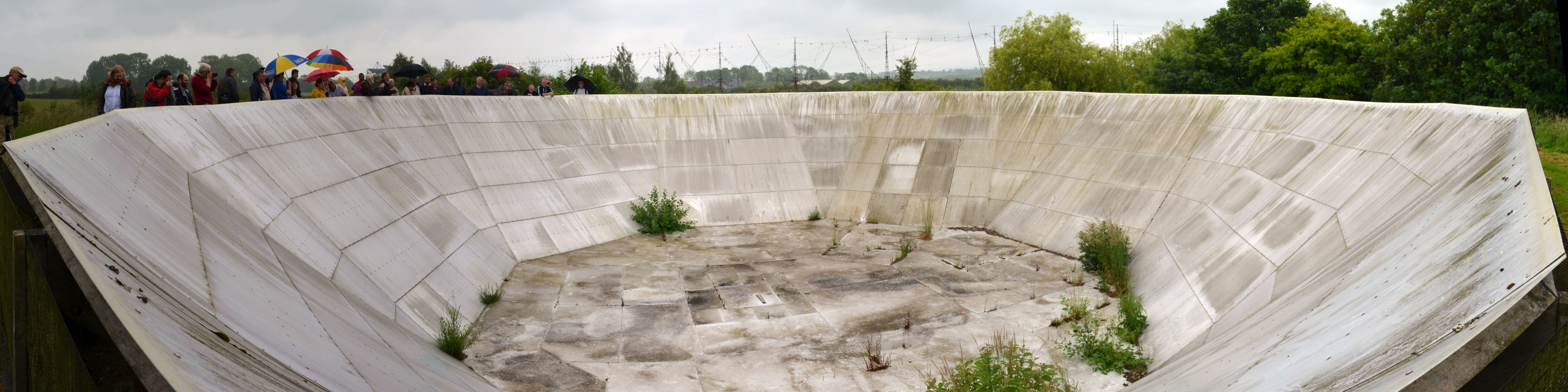
- Location(s): United Kingdom
- Coordinates: 52°09′58″N 0°02′02″E
- Location of Cosmic Anisotropy Telescope
- Related media on Commons

The Cosmic Anisotropy Telescope (CAT) was a three-element interferometer for cosmic microwave background radiation (CMB/R) observations at 13 to 17 GHz, based at the Mullard Radio Astronomy Observatory. In 1995, it was the first instrument to measure small-scale structure in the cosmic microwave background. When the more sensitive Very Small Array came online in 2000, the CAT was decommissioned and partly dismantled.
