= Angular correlation function =

Measure of the projected clustering of galaxies

The angular correlation function is a function which measures the projected clustering of galaxies, due to discrepancies between their actual and expected distributions. The function may be computed as follows: $w(\theta)=\frac{1}{N}\frac{dP}{d\Omega}-1$, where $P$ represents the conditional probability of finding a galaxy, $\Omega$ denotes the solid angle, and $N$ is the mean number density. In a homogeneous universe, the angular correlation scales with a characteristic depth.
