= Mobile Anisotropy Telescope =

Astronomic experiment

- Location: Cerro Toco, Atacama Desert, Chile
- Website: Princeton University MAT site University of Pennsylvania MAT site

The Mobile Anisotropy Telescope (MAT), also known as the Mobile Anisotropy Telescope on Cerro Toco (MAT/TOCO or TOCO) was a ground-based radio telescope experiment to measure the anisotropy of the cosmic microwave background (CMB). The experiment was conducted at an observation site on the southern slopes of Cerro Toco in the Atacama Desert of northern Chile. It was a collaboration between the physics departments at Princeton University and the University of Pennsylvania.

The telescope refitted the gondola and receiver from the QMAP experiment, mounted on a donated Nike Ajax trailer. Observations were taken in 1997 and 1998 from the Cerro Toco site, at an elevation of approximately 5,200 m (17,000 ft), with measurements of the angular power spectrum of the CMB in the multipole moment range of 50 to 400.

== Instrumentation ==
The receiver was equipped with SIS and HEMT detector systems with two SIS channels operated at 144 GHz and six HEMT channels, two with center frequencies of 31 GHz (Ka band) and four with center frequencies of 42 GHz (Q band). The two SIS mixers observed one beam each, with one SIS mixer at 0.2 degrees and the other at 0.3 degree. The Ka band HEMT channels observed the same pixel in the sky, orthogonally polarized to each other. Whereas the Q band HEMT channels observed two independent pixels in the sky, with two orthogonal polarizations for each pixel.

The optics consisted of a 0.86 m off-axis parabolic mirror and a computer-controlled chopper mirror. An array of corrugated feed horns connected the optics to the receiver.

== Results ==
The experiment aided in the detection of the first peak of the CMB's anisotropy power spectrum.

== See also ==
- Cosmic microwave background experiments
- Observational cosmology
