= Cosmic microwave background =

Trace radiation from the early universe

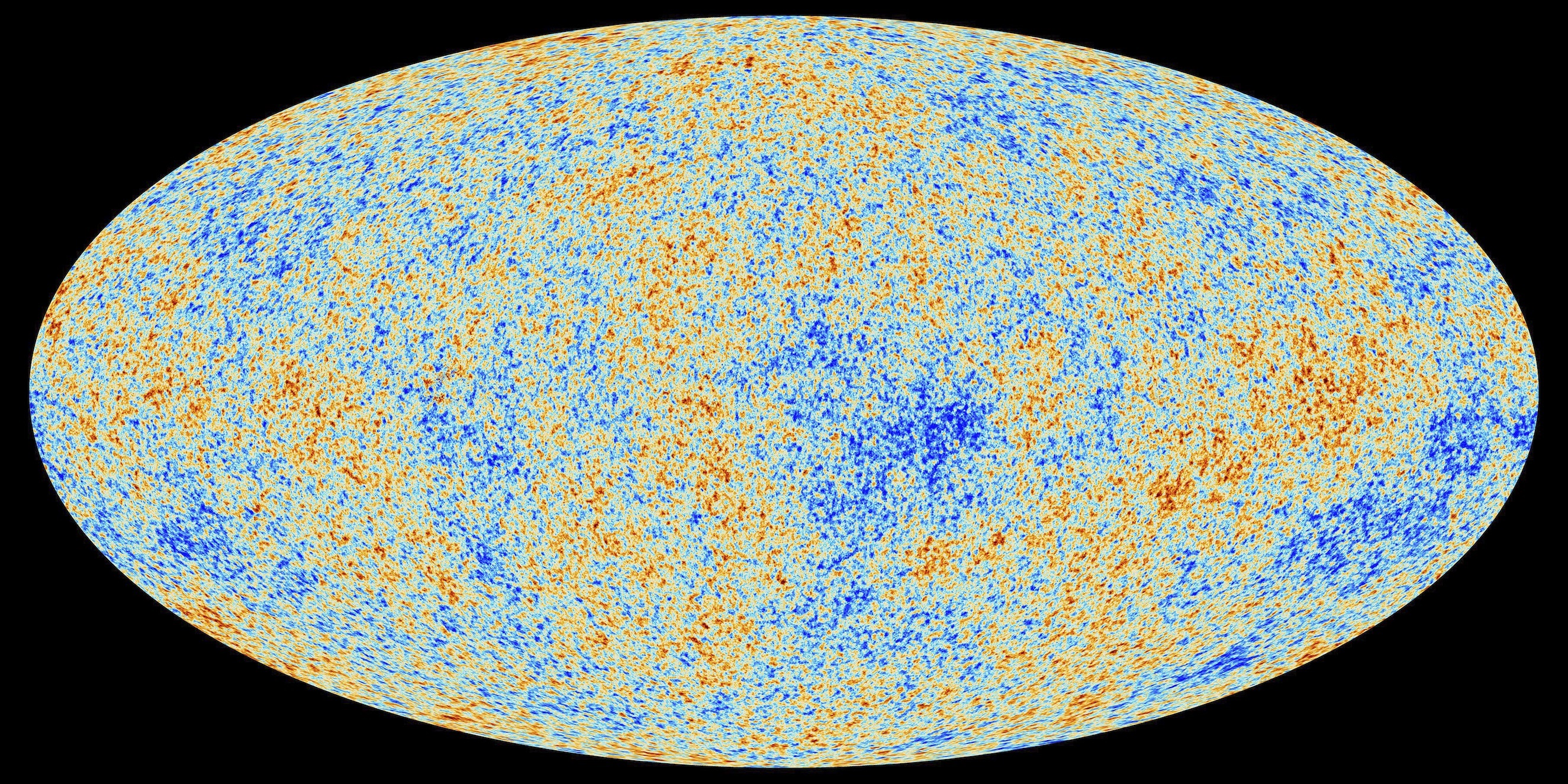
Temperature map of the cosmic microwave background measured by the Planck spacecraft

The cosmic microwave background (CMB, CMBR), or relic radiation, is microwave radiation that fills all space in the observable universe. With a standard optical telescope, the background space between stars and galaxies is almost completely dark. However, a sufficiently sensitive radio telescope detects a faint background glow that is almost uniform and is not associated with any star, galaxy, or other object. This glow is strongest in the microwave region of the electromagnetic spectrum. Its energy density exceeds that of all the photons emitted by all the stars in the history of the universe. The accidental discovery of the CMB in 1964 by the American radio astronomers Arno Allan Penzias and Robert Woodrow Wilson was the culmination of work initiated in the 1940s.

The CMB is the key experimental evidence of the Big Bang theory for the origin of the universe. In the Big Bang cosmological models, during the earliest periods, the universe was filled with an opaque fog of dense, hot plasma of sub-atomic particles. As the universe expanded, this plasma cooled to the point where protons and electrons combined to form neutral atoms of mostly hydrogen. Unlike the plasma, these atoms could not scatter thermal radiation by Thomson scattering, and so the universe became transparent. Known as the recombination epoch, this decoupling event released photons to travel freely through space. However, the photons have grown less energetic due to the cosmological redshift associated with the expansion of the universe. The surface of last scattering refers to a shell at the right distance in space so photons are now received that were originally emitted at the time of decoupling.

The CMB is very smooth and uniform, but maps by sensitive detectors detect small but important temperature variations. Ground and space-based experiments such as COBE, WMAP and Planck have been used to measure these temperature inhomogeneities. The anisotropy structure is influenced by various interactions of matter and photons up to the point of decoupling, which results in a characteristic pattern of tiny ripples that varies with angular scale. The distribution of the anisotropy across the sky has frequency components that can be represented by a power spectrum displaying a sequence of peaks and valleys. The peak values of this spectrum hold important information about the physical properties of the early universe: the first peak determines the overall curvature of the universe, while the second and third peak detail the density of normal matter and so-called dark matter, respectively. Extracting fine details from the CMB data can be challenging, since the emission has undergone modification by foreground features such as galaxy clusters.

== Features ==
Graph of cosmic microwave background spectrum around its peak in the microwave frequency range, as measured by the FIRAS instrument on the COBE. While vastly exaggerated "error bars" were included here to show the measured data points, the true error bars are too small to be seen even in an enlarged image, and it is impossible to distinguish the observed data from the blackbody spectrum for 2.725 K.

The cosmic microwave background radiation is an emission of uniform black body thermal energy coming from all directions. Intensity of the CMB is expressed in kelvin (K), the SI unit of temperature. The CMB has a thermal black body spectrum at a temperature of 2.72548±0.00057 K. Variations in intensity are expressed as variations in temperature. The blackbody temperature uniquely characterizes the intensity of the radiation at all wavelengths; a measured brightness temperature at any wavelength can be converted to a blackbody temperature.

The radiation is remarkably uniform across the sky, very unlike the almost point-like structure of stars or clumps of stars in galaxies. The radiation is isotropic to roughly one part in 25,000: the root mean square variations are just over 100 μK, after subtracting a dipole anisotropy from the Doppler shift of the background radiation. The latter is caused by the peculiar velocity of the Sun relative to the comoving cosmic rest frame as it moves at 369.82 ± 0.11 km/s towards the constellation Crater near its boundary with the constellation Leo. The CMB dipole and aberration at higher multipoles have been measured, consistent with galactic motion. Despite the very small degree of anisotropy in the CMB, many aspects can be measured with high precision and such measurements are critical for cosmological theories.

In addition to temperature anisotropy, the CMB should have an angular variation in polarization. The polarisation at each direction in the sky has an orientation described in terms of E-mode and B-mode polarization. The E-mode signal is a factor of 10 less strong than the temperature anisotropy; it supplements the temperature data as they are correlated. The B-mode signal is even weaker but may contain additional cosmological data.

The anisotropy is related to physical origin of the polarisation. Excitation of an electron by linear polarised light generates polarized light at 90 degrees to the incident direction. If the incoming radiation is isotropic, different incoming directions create polarizations that cancel out. If the incoming radiation has quadrupole anisotropy, residual polarization will be seen.

Other than the temperature and polarization anisotropy, the CMB frequency spectrum is expected to feature tiny departures from the black-body law known as spectral distortions. These are also at the focus of an active research effort with the hope of a first measurement within the forthcoming decades, as they contain a wealth of information about the primordial universe and the formation of structures at late time.

The CMB contains the vast majority of photons in the universe by a factor of 400 to 1; the number density of photons in the CMB is one billion times (10^{9}) the number density of matter in the universe. The present-day energy density of CMB photons greatly exceeds that of the photons emitted by all the stars over the history of the universe. Without the expansion of the universe to cause the cooling of the CMB, the night sky would shine as brightly as the Sun. The energy density of the CMB is 0.260 eV/cm^{3} (4.17×10^{−14} J/m^{3}), about 411 photons/cm^{3}.

== History ==
=== Early speculations ===
In 1931, Georges Lemaître speculated that remnants of the early universe may be observable as radiation, but his candidate was cosmic rays. Richard C. Tolman showed in 1934 that expansion of the universe would cool blackbody radiation while maintaining a thermal spectrum. The cosmic microwave background was first predicted in 1948 by Ralph Alpher and Robert Herman, in a correction they prepared for a paper by Alpher's PhD advisor George Gamow. They reasoned that if there was a Big Bang, the expansion of the universe would have stretched the high-energy radiation of the very early universe into the microwave region of the electromagnetic spectrum, and down to a temperature of about 5 K.

=== Discovery ===
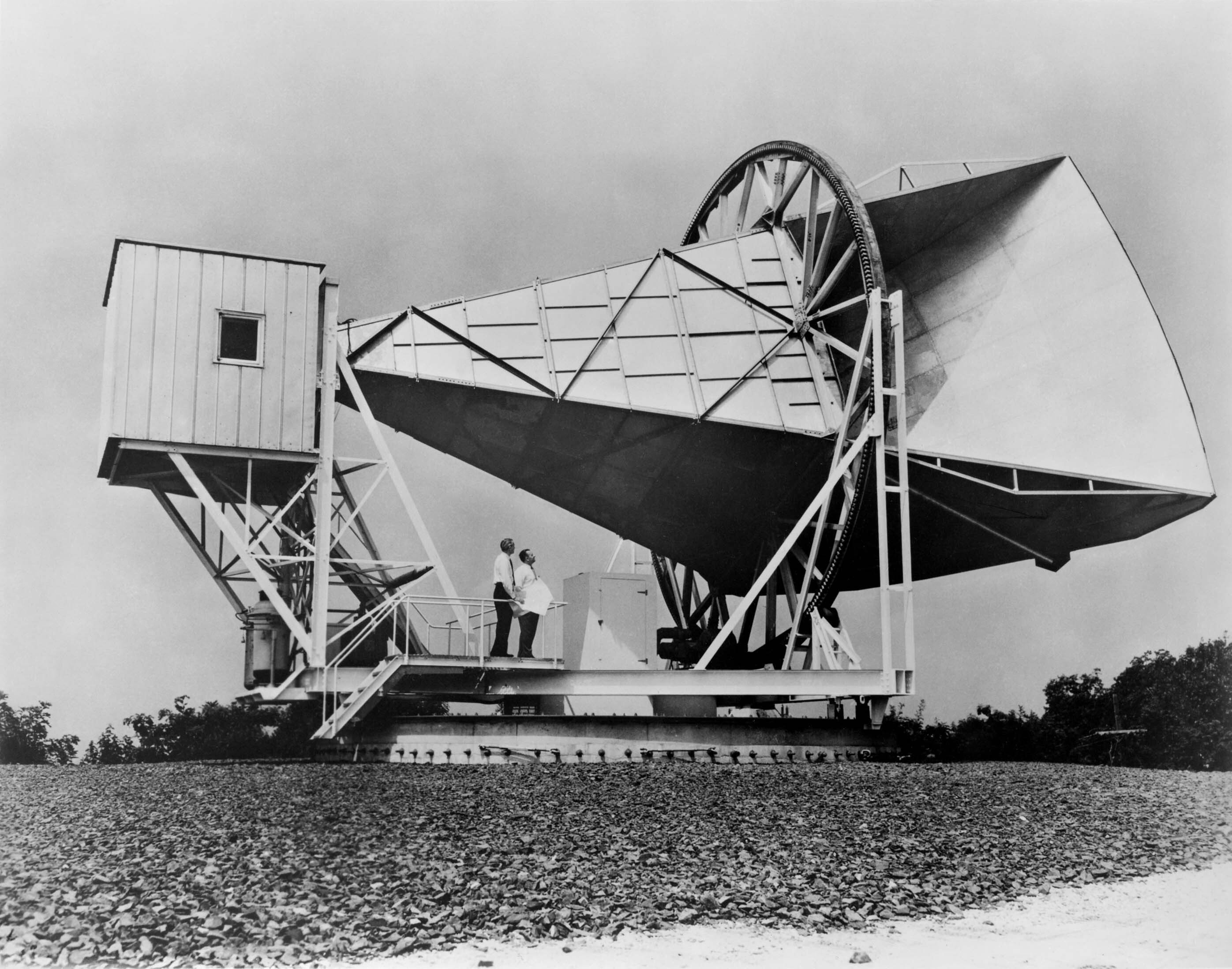
The Holmdel Horn Antenna on which Penzias and Wilson discovered the cosmic microwave background.

The first published recognition of the CMB radiation as a detectable phenomenon appeared in a brief paper by Soviet astrophysicists A. G. Doroshkevich and Igor Novikov, in the spring of 1964. In 1964, David Todd Wilkinson and Peter Roll, Robert H. Dicke's colleagues at Princeton University, began constructing a Dicke radiometer to measure the cosmic microwave background. In 1964, Arno Penzias and Robert Woodrow Wilson at the Crawford Hill location of Bell Telephone Laboratories in nearby Holmdel Township, New Jersey had built a Dicke radiometer that they intended to use for radio astronomy and satellite communication experiments. The antenna was constructed in 1959 to support Project Echo—the National Aeronautics and Space Administration's passive communications satellites, which used large Earth orbiting aluminized plastic balloons as reflectors to bounce radio signals from one point on the Earth to another. On 20 May 1964 they made their first measurement clearly showing the presence of the microwave background, with their instrument having an excess 4.2K antenna temperature which they could not account for. After receiving a telephone call from Crawford Hill, Dicke said "Boys, we've been scooped." A meeting between the Princeton and Crawford Hill groups determined that the antenna temperature was indeed due to the microwave background. Penzias and Wilson received the 1978 Nobel Prize in Physics for their discovery.

=== Cosmic origin ===
The interpretation of the cosmic microwave background was a controversial issue in the late 1960s. Alternative explanations included energy from within the Solar System, from galaxies, from intergalactic plasma and from multiple extragalactic radio sources. Two requirements would show that the microwave radiation was truly "cosmic". First, the intensity vs frequency or spectrum needed to be shown to match a thermal or blackbody source. This was accomplished by 1968 in a series of measurements of the radiation temperature at higher and lower wavelengths. Second, the radiation needed be shown to be isotropic, the same from all directions. This was also accomplished by 1970, demonstrating that this radiation was truly cosmic in origin. The discovery of the CMB in the mid-1960s curtailed interest in alternatives such as the steady state theory.

=== Progress on theory ===
In the 1970s numerous studies showed that tiny deviations from isotropy in the CMB could result from events in the early universe. Harrison, Peebles and Yu, and Zel'dovich realized that the early universe would require quantum inhomogeneities that would result in temperature anisotropy at the level of 10^{−4} or 10^{−5}. Rashid Sunyaev, using the alternative name relic radiation, calculated the observable imprint that these inhomogeneities would have on the cosmic microwave background.

=== COBE ===
After a lull in the 1970s caused in part by the many experimental difficulties in measuring CMB at high precision, increasingly stringent limits on the anisotropy of the cosmic microwave background were set by ground-based experiments during the 1980s. RELIKT-1, a Soviet cosmic microwave background anisotropy experiment on board the Prognoz 9 satellite (launched 1 July 1983), gave the first upper limits on the large-scale anisotropy.

The other key event in the 1980s was the proposal by Alan Guth for cosmic inflation. This theory of rapid spatial expansion gave an explanation for large-scale isotropy by allowing causal connection just before the epoch of last scattering. With this and similar theories, detailed prediction encouraged larger and more ambitious experiments.

The NASA Cosmic Background Explorer (COBE) satellite orbited Earth in 1989–1996 detected and quantified the large-scale anisotropies at the limit of its detection capabilities. The NASA COBE mission clearly confirmed the primary anisotropy with the Differential Microwave Radiometer instrument, publishing their findings in 1992. The team received the Nobel Prize in physics in 2006 for this discovery.

=== Precision cosmology ===
Inspired by the COBE results, a series of ground and balloon-based experiments measured cosmic microwave background anisotropies on smaller angular scales over the next two decades. The sensitivity of the new experiments improved dramatically, with a reduction in internal noise by three orders of magnitude. The primary goal of these experiments was to measure the scale of the first acoustic peak, which COBE did not have sufficient resolution to resolve. This peak corresponds to large scale density variations in the early universe that are created by gravitational instabilities, resulting in acoustical oscillations in the plasma. The first peak in the anisotropy was tentatively detected by the MAT/TOCO experiment and the result was confirmed by the BOOMERanG and MAXIMA experiments. These measurements demonstrated that the geometry of the universe is approximately flat, rather than curved. They ruled out cosmic strings as a major component of cosmic structure formation and suggested cosmic inflation was the right theory of structure formation.

=== Observations after COBE ===
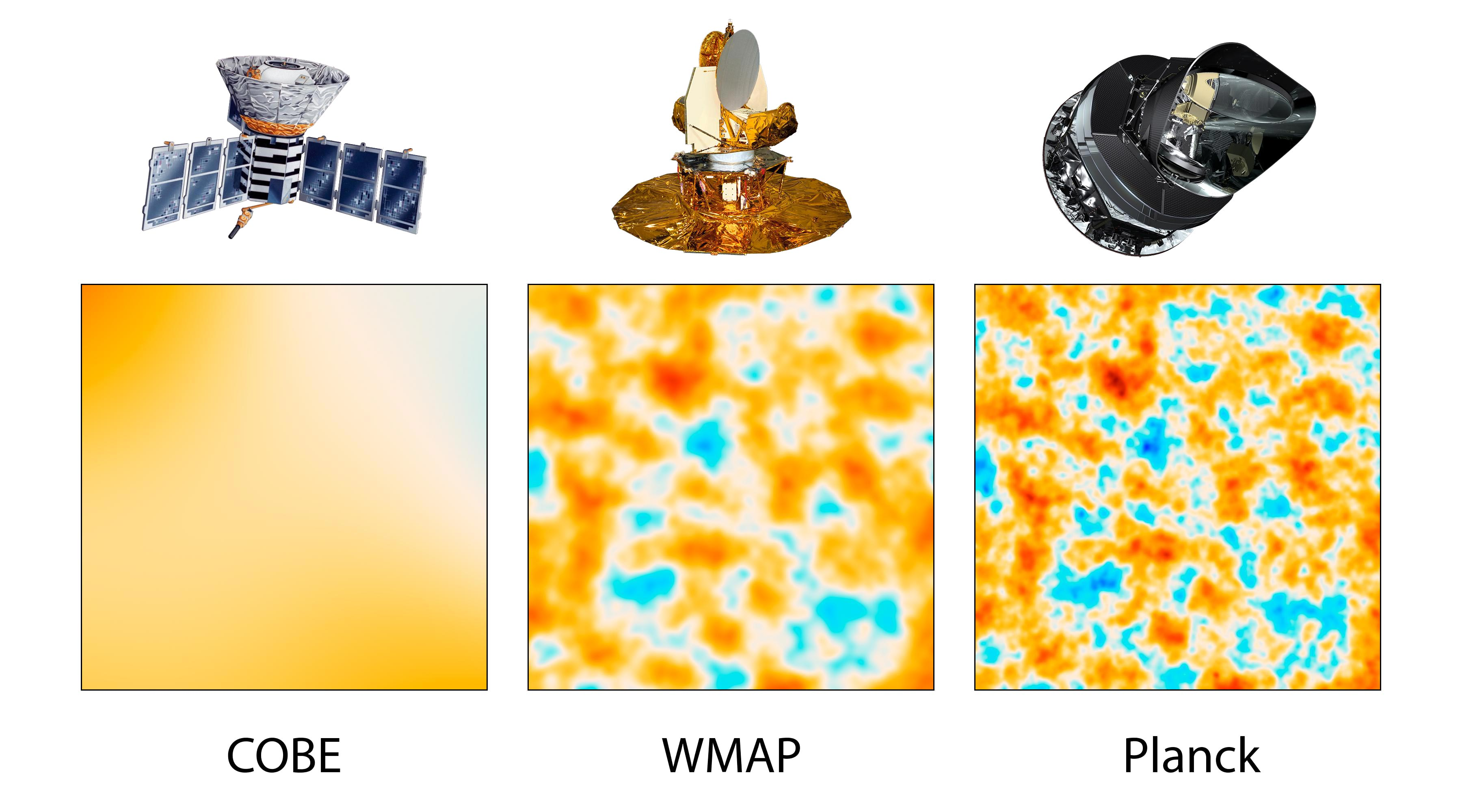
Comparison of CMB results from COBE, WMAP and Planck (March 21, 2013)

Inspired by the initial COBE results of an extremely isotropic and homogeneous background, a series of ground- and balloon-based experiments quantified CMB anisotropies on smaller angular scales over the next decade. The primary goal of these experiments was to measure the angular scale of the first acoustic peak, for which COBE did not have sufficient resolution. These measurements were able to rule out cosmic strings as the leading theory of cosmic structure formation, and suggested cosmic inflation was the right theory.

During the 1990s, the first peak was measured with increasing sensitivity and by 2000 the BOOMERanG experiment reported that the highest power fluctuations occur at scales of approximately one angular degree. Together with other cosmological data, these results implied that the geometry of the universe is flat. A number of ground-based interferometers provided measurements of the fluctuations with higher accuracy over the next three years, including the Very Small Array, Degree Angular Scale Interferometer (DASI), and the Cosmic Background Imager (CBI). DASI made the first detection of the polarization of the CMB and the CBI provided the first E-mode polarization spectrum with compelling evidence that it is out of phase with the T-mode spectrum.

=== Wilkinson Microwave Anisotropy Probe ===
In June 2001, NASA launched a second CMB space mission, WMAP, to make much more precise measurements of the large-scale anisotropies over the full sky. WMAP used symmetric, rapid-multi-modulated scanning, rapid switching radiometers at five frequencies to minimize non-sky signal noise. The data from the mission was released in five installments, the last being the nine-year summary. The results are broadly consistent Lambda CDM models based on 6 free parameters and fitting in to Big Bang cosmology with cosmic inflation.

=== Degree Angular Scale Interferometer ===
The Degree Angular Scale Interferometer (DASI) was a telescope installed at the U.S. National Science Foundation's Amundsen–Scott South Pole Station in Antarctica. It was a 13-element interferometer operating between 26 and 36 GHz (Ka band) in ten bands. The instrument is similar in design to the Cosmic Background Imager (CBI) and the Very Small Array (VSA). In 2001 The DASI team announced the most detailed measurements of the temperature, or power spectrum of the cosmic microwave background (CMB). These results contained the first detection of the 2nd and 3rd acoustic peaks in the CMB, which were important evidence for inflation theory. This announcement was done in conjunction with the BOOMERanG and MAXIMA experiment. In 2002 the team reported the first detection of polarization anisotropies in the CMB.

=== Atacama Cosmology Telescope ===
The Atacama Cosmology Telescope (ACT) was a cosmological millimeter-wave telescope located on Cerro Toco in the Atacama Desert in the north of Chile. ACT made high-sensitivity, arcminute resolution, microwave-wavelength surveys of the sky in order to study the cosmic microwave background radiation (CMB), the relic radiation left by the Big Bang process. Located 40 km from San Pedro de Atacama, at an altitude of 5,190 metres (17,030 ft), it was one of the highest ground-based telescopes in the world. (Note: The Receiver Lab Telescope (RLT), an 80 cm (31 in) instrument, is higher at 5,525 m (18,125 ft), but is not permanent as it is fixed to the roof of a movable shipping container. The 2009 University of Tokyo Atacama Observatory is significantly higher than both.)

=== Planck ===
A third space mission, the ESA (European Space Agency) Planck, was launched in May 2009 and performed an even more detailed investigation until it was shut down in October 2013. Planck employed both HEMT radiometers and bolometer technology and measured the CMB at a smaller scale than WMAP. Its detectors were trialled in the Antarctic Viper telescope as ACBAR (Arcminute Cosmology Bolometer Array Receiver) experiment—which has produced the most precise measurements at small angular scales to date—and in the Archeops balloon telescope.

On 21 March 2013, the European-led research team behind the Planck cosmology probe released the mission's all-sky map of the cosmic microwave background. The map suggests the universe is slightly older than researchers expected. According to the map, subtle fluctuations in temperature were imprinted on the deep sky when the cosmos was about 370000 years old. The imprint reflects ripples that arose as early, in the existence of the universe, as the first nonillionth (10^{−30}) of a second. Apparently, these ripples gave rise to the present vast cosmic web of galaxy clusters and dark matter. Based on the 2013 data, the universe contains 4.9% ordinary matter, 26.8% dark matter and 68.3% dark energy. On 5 February 2015, new data was released by the Planck mission, according to which the age of the universe is 13.799±0.021 billion years old and the Hubble constant was measured to be 67.74±0.46 (km/s)/Mpc.

=== South Pole Telescope ===
The South Pole Telescope (SPT) is a 10-metre (390 in) diameter telescope located at the Amundsen–Scott South Pole Station, Antarctica. The telescope is designed for observations in the microwave, millimeter-wave, and submillimeter-wave regions of the electromagnetic spectrum, with the particular design goal of measuring the faint, diffuse emission from the cosmic microwave background (CMB). Key results include the first detection of B-mode polarization in the CMB, the discovery of over 1000 clusters of galaxies using the Sunyaev–Zel'dovich effect, the discovery of a population of high-redshift, strongly lensed dusty galaxies, and unprecedentedly sensitive measurements of the primary temperature and polarization power spectra of the CMB at small angular scales.

== Theoretical models ==
The cosmic microwave background radiation together with the cosmological redshift-distance relation regarded as the best available evidence for the Big Bang event. The CMB has three main properties critical to its role in cosmology. First, the existence of the CMB directly implies the hot dense early state of the universe, the Big Bang model. Second, the CMB is the most perfect black body spectrum ever measured, meaning that the radiation derived from a cosmological source. Third, high precise measurements of the CMB reveal small anisotropic fluctuations. These properties need to be explained by any cosmological model. Successful modeling of the CMB have made the inflationary Big Bang model the Standard Cosmological Model.

In the Big Bang model for the formation of the universe, inflationary cosmology predicts that after about 10^{−37} seconds the nascent universe underwent exponential growth that smoothed out nearly all irregularities. The remaining irregularities were caused by quantum fluctuations in the inflaton field that caused the inflation event.

Long before the formation of stars and planets, the early universe was more compact, much hotter and, starting 10^{−6} seconds after the Big Bang, filled with a uniform glow from its white-hot fog of interacting plasma of photons, electrons, and baryons. As the universe expanded, adiabatic cooling caused the energy density of the plasma to decrease until it became favorable for electrons to combine with protons, forming hydrogen atoms. This recombination event happened when the temperature was around 3000 K or when the universe was approximately 379,000 years old. As photons did not interact with these electrically neutral atoms, the former began to travel freely through space, resulting in the decoupling of matter and radiation. The decoupled radiation would become the CMB.

The color temperature of the ensemble of decoupled photons has continued to diminish ever since; now down to 2.7260±0.0013 K, it will continue to drop as the universe expands. The intensity of the radiation corresponds to black-body radiation at 2.726 K because red-shifted black-body radiation is just like black-body radiation at a lower temperature. According to the Big Bang model, the radiation from the sky we measure today comes from a spherical surface called the surface of last scattering. This represents the set of locations in space at which the decoupling event is estimated to have occurred and at a point in time such that the photons from that distance have just reached observers. Most of the radiation energy in the universe is in the cosmic microwave background, making up a fraction of roughly 6×10^{−5} of the total density of the universe.

=== Predictions based on the Big Bang model ===
According to standard cosmology, the CMB gives a snapshot of the hot early universe at the point in time when the temperature dropped enough to allow electrons and protons to form hydrogen atoms. This event made the universe nearly transparent to radiation because light was no longer being scattered off free electrons. When this occurred some 380,000 years after the Big Bang, the temperature of the universe was about 3,000 K. This corresponds to an ambient energy of about 0.26 eV, which is much less than the 13.6 eV ionization energy of hydrogen. This epoch is generally known as the "time of last scattering" or the period of recombination or decoupling.

Since decoupling, the color temperature of the background radiation has dropped by an average factor of 1,089 due to the expansion of the universe. As the universe expands, the CMB photons are redshifted, causing them to decrease in energy. The color temperature of this radiation stays inversely proportional to a parameter that describes the relative expansion of the universe over time, known as the scale length. The color temperature T_{r} of the CMB as a function of redshift, z, can be shown to be proportional to the color temperature of the CMB as observed in the present day (2.725 K or 0.2348 meV):

T_{r} = 2.725 K × (1 + z)

The high degree of uniformity throughout the observable universe and its faint but measured anisotropy lend strong support for the Big Bang model in general and the ΛCDM ("Lambda Cold Dark Matter") model in particular. Moreover, the fluctuations are coherent on angular scales that are larger than the apparent cosmological horizon at recombination. Either such coherence is acausally fine-tuned, or cosmic inflation occurred.

==== Primary anisotropy ====
The power spectrum of the cosmic microwave background radiation temperature anisotropy in terms of the angular scale (or multipole moment). The data shown comes from the WMAP (2006), Acbar (2004) Boomerang (2005), CBI (2004), and VSA (2004) instruments. Also shown is a theoretical model (solid line).

The anisotropy, or directional dependency, of the cosmic microwave background is divided into two types: primary anisotropy, due to effects that occur at the surface of last scattering and before; and secondary anisotropy, due to effects such as interactions of the background radiation with intervening hot gas or gravitational potentials, which occur between the last scattering surface and the observer.

The structure of the cosmic microwave background anisotropies is principally determined by two effects: acoustic oscillations and diffusion damping (also called collisionless damping or Silk damping). The acoustic oscillations arise because of a conflict in the photon–baryon plasma in the early universe. The pressure of the photons tends to erase anisotropies, whereas the gravitational attraction of the baryons, moving at speeds much slower than light, makes them tend to collapse to form overdensities. These two effects compete to create acoustic oscillations, which give the microwave background its characteristic peak structure. The peaks correspond, roughly, to resonances in which the photons decouple when a particular mode is at its peak amplitude.

The peaks contain interesting physical signatures. The angular scale of the first peak determines the curvature of the universe (but not the topology of the universe). The next peak—ratio of the odd peaks to the even peaks—determines the reduced baryon density. The third peak can be used to get information about the dark-matter density.

The locations of the peaks give important information about the nature of the primordial density perturbations. There are two fundamental types of density perturbations called adiabatic and isocurvature. A general density perturbation is a mixture of both, and different theories that purport to explain the primordial density perturbation spectrum predict different mixtures.

Adiabatic density perturbations
In an adiabatic density perturbation, the fractional additional number density of each type of particle (baryons, photons, etc.) is the same. That is, if at one place there is a 1% higher number density of baryons than average, then at that place there is a 1% higher number density of photons (and a 1% higher number density in neutrinos) than average. Cosmic inflation predicts that the primordial perturbations are adiabatic.
Isocurvature density perturbations
In an isocurvature density perturbation, the sum (over different types of particle) of the fractional additional densities is zero. That is, a perturbation where at some spot there is 1% more energy in baryons than average, 1% more energy in photons than average, and 2% less energy in neutrinos than average, would be a pure isocurvature perturbation. Hypothetical cosmic strings would produce mostly isocurvature primordial perturbations.

The CMB spectrum can distinguish between these two because these two types of perturbations produce different peak locations. Isocurvature density perturbations produce a series of peaks whose angular scales (ℓ values of the peaks) are roughly in the ratio 1 : 3 : 5 : ..., while adiabatic density perturbations produce peaks whose locations are in the ratio 1 : 2 : 3 : ... Observations are consistent with the primordial density perturbations being entirely adiabatic, providing key support for inflation, and ruling out many models of structure formation involving, for example, cosmic strings.

Collisionless damping is caused by two effects, when the treatment of the primordial plasma as fluid begins to break down:

- the increasing mean free path of the photons as the primordial plasma becomes increasingly rarefied in an expanding universe,
- the finite depth of the last scattering surface (LSS), which causes the mean free path to increase rapidly during decoupling, even while some Compton scattering is still occurring.

These effects contribute about equally to the suppression of anisotropies at small scales and give rise to the characteristic exponential damping tail seen in the very small angular scale anisotropies.

The depth of the LSS refers to the fact that the decoupling of the photons and baryons does not happen instantaneously, but instead requires an appreciable fraction of the age of the universe up to that era. One method of quantifying how long this process took uses the photon visibility function (PVF). This function is defined so that, denoting the PVF by P(t), the probability that a CMB photon last scattered between time t and t + dt is given by P(t) dt.

The maximum of the PVF (the time when it is most likely that a given CMB photon last scattered) is known quite precisely. The first-year WMAP results put the time at which P(t) has a maximum as 372,000 years. This is often taken as the "time" at which the CMB formed. However, to figure out how long it took the photons and baryons to decouple, we need a measure of the width of the PVF. The WMAP team finds that the PVF is greater than half of its maximal value (the "full width at half maximum", or FWHM) over an interval of 115,000 years. By this measure, decoupling took place over roughly 115,000 years, and thus when it was complete, the universe was roughly 487,000 years old.

==== Late time anisotropy ====
Since the CMB came into existence, it has apparently been modified by several subsequent physical processes, which are collectively referred to as late-time anisotropy, or secondary anisotropy. When the CMB photons became free to travel unimpeded, ordinary matter in the universe was mostly in the form of neutral hydrogen and helium atoms. However, observations of galaxies today seem to indicate that most of the volume of the intergalactic medium (IGM) consists of ionized material (since there are few absorption lines due to hydrogen atoms). This implies a period of reionization during which some of the material of the universe was broken into hydrogen ions.

The CMB photons are scattered by free charges such as electrons that are not bound in atoms. In an ionized universe, such charged particles have been liberated from neutral atoms by ionizing (ultraviolet) radiation. Today these free charges are at sufficiently low density in most of the volume of the universe that they do not measurably affect the CMB. However, if the IGM was ionized at very early times when the universe was still denser, then there are two main effects on the CMB:

1. Small scale anisotropies are erased. (Just as when looking at an object through fog, details of the object appear fuzzy.)
2. The physics of how photons are scattered by free electrons (Thomson scattering) induces polarization anisotropies on large angular scales. This broad angle polarization is correlated with the broad angle temperature perturbation.

Both of these effects have been observed by the WMAP spacecraft, providing evidence that the universe was ionized at very early times, at a redshift around 10. The detailed provenance of this early ionizing radiation is still a matter of scientific debate. It may have included starlight from the very first population of stars (population III stars), supernovae when these first stars reached the end of their lives, or the ionizing radiation produced by the accretion disks of massive black holes.

The time following the emission of the cosmic microwave background—and before the observation of the first stars—is semi-humorously referred to by cosmologists as the Dark Age, and is a period which is under intense study by astronomers (see 21 centimeter radiation).

Two other effects which occurred between reionization and our observations of the cosmic microwave background, and which appear to cause anisotropies, are the Sunyaev–Zel'dovich effect, where a cloud of high-energy electrons scatters the radiation, transferring some of its energy to the CMB photons, and the Sachs–Wolfe effect, which causes photons from the Cosmic Microwave Background to be gravitationally redshifted or blueshifted due to changing gravitational fields.

=== Alternative theories ===
The standard cosmology that includes the Big Bang "enjoys considerable popularity among the practicing cosmologists" However, there are challenges to the standard Big Bang framework for explaining CMB data. In particular standard cosmology requires fine-tuning of some free parameters, with different values supported by different experimental data. As an example of the fine-tuning issue, standard cosmology cannot predict the present temperature of the relic radiation, $T_0$. This value of $T_0$ is one of the best results of experimental cosmology and the steady state model can predict it. However, alternative models have their own set of problems and they have only made post-facto explanations of existing observations. Nevertheless, these alternatives have played an important historic role in providing ideas for and challenges to the standard explanation.

== Polarization ==
Temperature power spectrum and E-mode and B-mode polarization power spectra of the cosmic microwave background

The cosmic microwave background is polarized at the level of a few microkelvin. There are two types of polarization, called E-mode (or gradient-mode) and B-mode (or curl mode). This is in analogy to electrostatics, in which the electric field (E-field) has a vanishing curl and the magnetic field (B-field) has a vanishing divergence.

=== E-modes ===
The E-modes arise from Thomson scattering in a heterogeneous plasma. E-modes were first seen in 2002 by the Degree Angular Scale Interferometer (DASI).

=== B-modes ===
B-modes are expected to be an order of magnitude weaker than the E-modes. The former are not produced by standard scalar type perturbations, but are generated by gravitational waves during cosmic inflation shortly after the Big Bang. However, gravitational lensing of the stronger E-modes can also produce B-mode polarization. Detecting the original B-modes signal requires analysis of the contamination caused by lensing of the relatively strong E-mode signal.

==== Primordial gravitational waves ====
Models of "slow-roll" cosmic inflation in the early universe predicts primordial gravitational waves that would impact the polarisation of the cosmic microwave background, creating a specific pattern of B-mode polarization. Detection of this pattern would support the theory of inflation and their strength can confirm and exclude different models of inflation. While claims that this characteristic pattern of B-mode polarization had been measured by BICEP2 instrument were later attributed to cosmic dust due to new results of the Planck experiment, subsequent reanalysis with compensation for foreground dust show limits in agreement with results from Lambda-CDM models.

==== Gravitational lensing ====
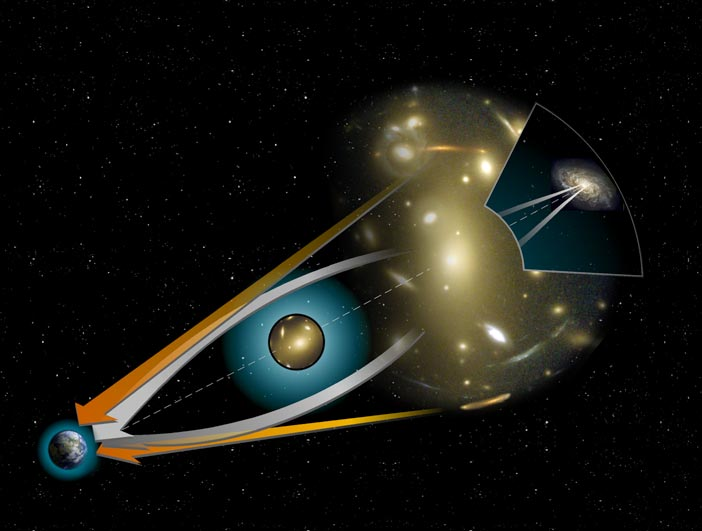
Artist impression of the gravitational lensing effect of massive cosmic structures

The second type of B-modes was discovered in 2013 using the South Pole Telescope with help from the Herschel Space Observatory. In October 2014, a measurement of the B-mode polarization at 150 GHz was published by the POLARBEAR experiment. Compared to BICEP2, POLARBEAR focuses on a smaller patch of the sky and is less susceptible to dust effects. The team reported that POLARBEAR's measured B-mode polarization was of cosmological origin (and not just due to dust) at a 97.2% confidence level.

== Multipole analysis ==
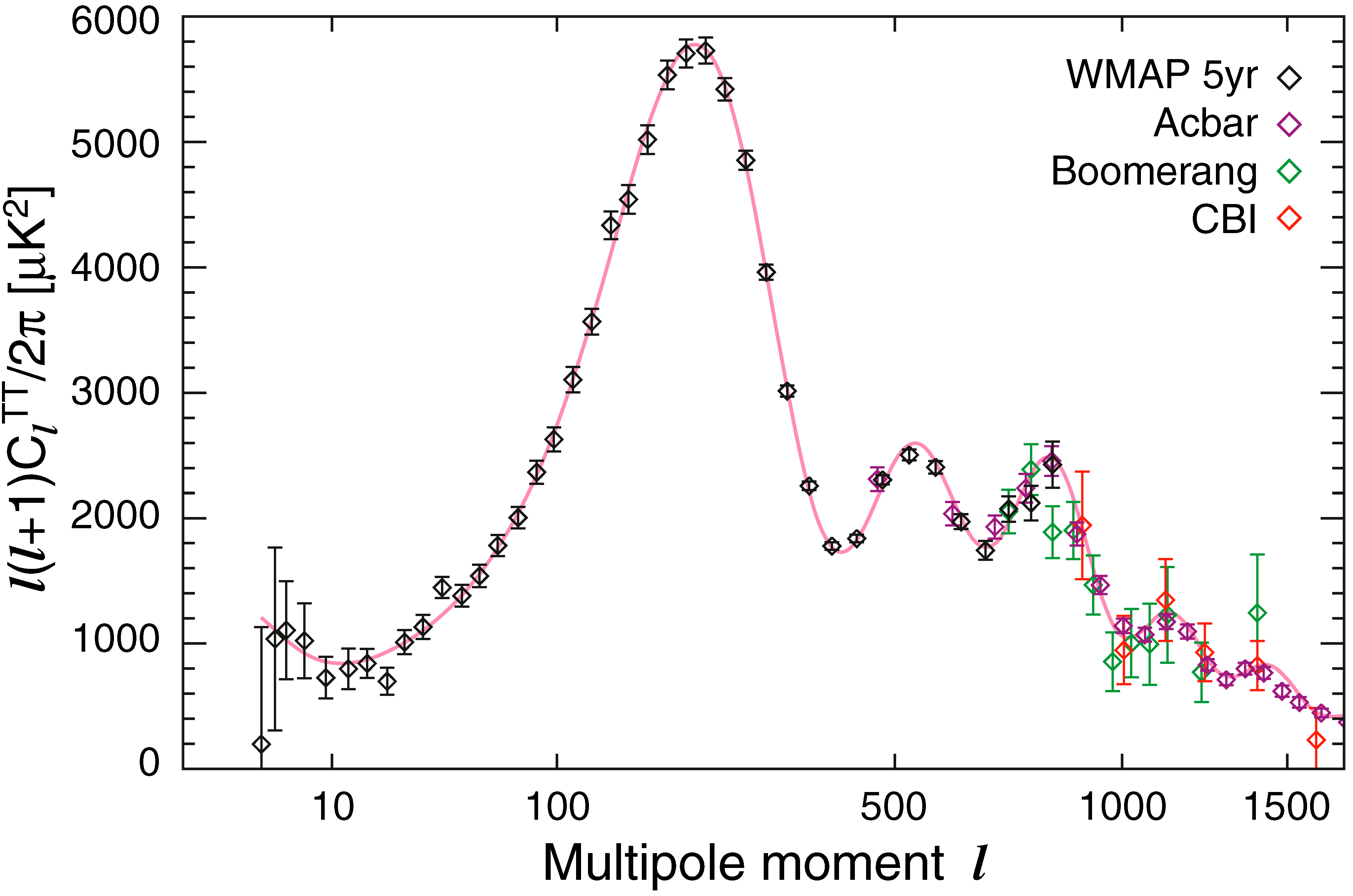
Example Multipole Power Spectrum. WMAP Data are represented as points, curves correspond to the best-fit LCDM model

The CMB angular anisotropies are usually presented in terms of power per multipole. The map of temperature across the sky, $T(\theta,\varphi),$ is written as coefficients of spherical harmonics,
$$T(\theta,\varphi) = \sum_{\ell m} a_{\ell m} Y_{\ell m}(\theta,\varphi)$$
where the $a_{\ell m}$ term measures the strength of the angular oscillation in $Y_{\ell m}(\theta,\varphi)$, and ℓ is the multipole number while m is the azimuthal number. The azimuthal variation is not significant and is removed by applying the angular correlation function, giving power spectrum term $C_{\ell}\equiv \langle |a_{\ell m}|^2 \rangle.$ Increasing values of ℓ correspond to higher multipole moments of CMB, meaning more rapid variation with angle.

=== CMBR monopole term (ℓ = 0) ===
The monopole term, ℓ = 0, is the constant isotropic mean temperature of the CMB, T_{γ} = 2.7255±0.0006 K with one standard deviation confidence. This term must be measured with absolute temperature devices, such as the FIRAS instrument on the COBE satellite.

=== CMBR dipole anisotropy (ℓ = 1) ===
CMB dipole represents the largest anisotropy, which is in the first spherical harmonic (ℓ = 1), a cosine function. The amplitude of CMB dipole is around 3.3621±0.0010 mK. The CMB dipole moment is interpreted as the peculiar motion of the Earth relative to the CMB. Its amplitude depends on the time due to the Earth's orbit about the barycenter of the solar system. This enables us to add a time-dependent term to the dipole expression. The modulation of this term is 1 year, which fits the observation done by COBE FIRAS. The dipole moment does not encode any primordial information.

From the CMB data, it is seen that the Sun appears to be moving at 369.82±0.11 km/s relative to the reference frame of the CMB (also called the CMB rest frame, or the frame of reference in which there is no motion through the CMB). The Local Group — the galaxy group that includes our own Milky Way galaxy — appears to be moving at 620±15 km/s in the direction of galactic longitude ℓ = 271.9°±2°, b = 30°±3°. The dipole is now used to calibrate mapping studies.

=== Multipole (ℓ ≥ 2) ===
The temperature variation in the CMB temperature maps at higher multipoles, or ℓ ≥ 2, is considered to be the result of perturbations of the density in the early Universe, before the recombination epoch at a redshift of around z ⋍ 1100. Before recombination, the Universe consisted of a hot, dense plasma of electrons and baryons. In such a hot dense environment, electrons and protons could not form any neutral atoms. The baryons in such early Universe remained highly ionized and so were tightly coupled with photons through the effect of Thompson scattering. These phenomena caused the pressure and gravitational effects to act against each other, and triggered fluctuations in the photon-baryon plasma. Quickly after the recombination epoch, the rapid expansion of the universe caused the plasma to cool down and these fluctuations are "frozen into" the CMB maps we observe today.

=== Anomalies ===
With the increasingly precise data provided by WMAP, there have been a number of claims that the CMB exhibits anomalies, such as very large scale anisotropies, anomalous alignments, and non-Gaussian distributions. The most longstanding of these is the low-ℓ multipole controversy. Even in the COBE map, it was observed that the quadrupole (ℓ = 2, spherical harmonic) has a low amplitude compared to the predictions of the Big Bang. In particular, the quadrupole and octupole (ℓ = 3) modes appear to have an unexplained alignment with each other and with both the ecliptic plane and equinoxes. A number of groups have suggested that this could be the signature of quantum corrections or new physics at the greatest observable scales; other groups suspect systematic errors in the data.

Ultimately, due to the foregrounds and the cosmic variance problem, the greatest modes will never be as well measured as the small angular scale modes. The analyses were performed on two maps that have had the foregrounds removed as far as possible: the "internal linear combination" map of the WMAP collaboration and a similar map prepared by Max Tegmark and others. Later analyses have pointed out that these are the modes most susceptible to foreground contamination from synchrotron, dust, and bremsstrahlung emission, and from experimental uncertainty in the monopole and dipole.

A full Bayesian analysis of the WMAP power spectrum demonstrates that the quadrupole prediction of Lambda-CDM cosmology is consistent with the data at the 10% level and that the observed octupole is not remarkable. Carefully accounting for the procedure used to remove the foregrounds from the full sky map further reduces the significance of the alignment by ~5%. Recent observations with the Planck telescope, which is very much more sensitive than WMAP and has a larger angular resolution, record the same anomaly, and so instrumental error (but not foreground contamination) appears to be ruled out. Coincidence is a possible explanation, chief scientist from WMAP, Charles L. Bennett suggested coincidence and human psychology were involved, "I do think there is a bit of a psychological effect; people want to find unusual things."

Measurements of the density of quasars based on Wide-field Infrared Survey Explorer data finds a dipole significantly different from the one extracted from the CMB anisotropy. This difference is in conflict with the cosmological principle.

== Future evolution ==
Assuming the universe keeps expanding and it does not suffer a Big Crunch, a Big Rip, or another similar fate, the cosmic microwave background will continue redshifting until it will no longer be detectable, and will be superseded first by the one produced by starlight, and perhaps, later by the background radiation fields of processes that may take place in the far future of the universe such as proton decay, evaporation of black holes, positronium decay, or Unruh-effect radiation associated with the particle horizon.

== Timeline of prediction, discovery and interpretation ==
=== Thermal (non-microwave background) temperature predictions ===
- 1896 – Charles Édouard Guillaume estimates the "radiation of the stars" to be 5–6 K.
- 1926 – Sir Arthur Eddington estimates the non-thermal radiation of starlight in the galaxy "... by the formula E = σT^{4} the effective temperature corresponding to this density is 3.18° absolute ... black body".
- 1930s – Cosmologist Erich Regener calculates that the non-thermal spectrum of cosmic rays in the galaxy has an effective temperature of 2.8 K.
- 1931 – Term microwave first used in print: "When trials with wavelengths as low as 18 cm. were made known, there was undisguised surprise+that the problem of the micro-wave had been solved so soon." Telegraph & Telephone Journal XVII. 179/1
- 1934 – Richard Tolman shows that black-body radiation in an expanding universe cools but remains thermal.
- 1946 – Robert Dicke predicts "... radiation from cosmic matter" at < 20 K, but did not refer to background radiation.
- 1946 – George Gamow calculates a temperature of 50 K (assuming a 3-billion year old universe), commenting it "... is in reasonable agreement with the actual temperature of interstellar space", but does not mention background radiation.
- 1953 – Erwin Finlay-Freundlich in support of his tired light theory, derives a blackbody temperature for intergalactic space of 2.3 K and in the following year values of 1.9K and 6.0K.

=== Microwave background radiation predictions and measurements ===
- 1941 – Andrew McKellar detected a "rotational" temperature of 2.3 K for the interstellar medium by comparing the population of CN doublet lines measured by W. S. Adams in a B star.
- 1948 – Ralph Alpher and Robert Herman estimate "the temperature in the universe" at 5 K. Although they do not specifically mention microwave background radiation, it may be inferred.
- 1953 – George Gamow estimates 7 K based on a model that does not rely on a free parameter
- 1955 – Émile Le Roux of the Nançay Radio Observatory, in a sky survey at λ = 33 cm, initially reported a near-isotropic background radiation of 3 kelvins, plus or minus 2; he did not recognize the cosmological significance and later revised the error bars to 20K.
- 1957 – Tigran Shmaonov reports that "the absolute effective temperature of the radioemission background ... is 4±3 K". with radiation intensity was independent of either time or direction of observation. Although Shamonov did not recognize it at the time, it is now clear that Shmaonov did observe the cosmic microwave background at a wavelength of 3.2 cm
- 1964 – A. G. Doroshkevich and Igor Dmitrievich Novikov publish a brief paper suggesting microwave searches for the black-body radiation predicted by Gamow, Alpher, and Herman, where they name the CMB radiation phenomenon as detectable.
- 1964–65 – Arno Penzias and Robert Woodrow Wilson measure the temperature to be approximately 3 K. Robert Dicke, James Peebles, P. G. Roll, and D. T. Wilkinson interpret this radiation as a signature of the Big Bang.
- 1966 – Rainer K. Sachs and Arthur M. Wolfe theoretically predict microwave background fluctuation amplitudes created by gravitational potential variations between observers and the last scattering surface (see Sachs–Wolfe effect).
- 1968 – Martin Rees and Dennis Sciama theoretically predict microwave background fluctuation amplitudes created by photons traversing time-dependent wells of potential.
- 1969 – R. A. Sunyaev and Yakov Zel'dovich study the inverse Compton scattering of microwave background photons by hot electrons (see Sunyaev–Zel'dovich effect).
- 1983 – Researchers from the Cambridge Radio Astronomy Group and the Owens Valley Radio Observatory first detect the Sunyaev–Zel'dovich effect from clusters of galaxies.
- 1983 – RELIKT-1 Soviet CMB anisotropy experiment was launched.
- 1990 – FIRAS on the Cosmic Background Explorer (COBE) satellite measures the black body form of the CMB spectrum with exquisite precision, and shows that the microwave background has a nearly perfect black-body spectrum with T = 2.73 K and thereby strongly constrains the density of the intergalactic medium.
- January 1992 – Scientists that analysed data from the RELIKT-1 report the discovery of anisotropy in the cosmic microwave background at the Moscow astrophysical seminar.
- 1992 – Scientists that analysed data from COBE DMR report the discovery of anisotropy in the cosmic microwave background.
- 1995 – The Cosmic Anisotropy Telescope performs the first high resolution observations of the cosmic microwave background.
- 1999 – First measurements of acoustic oscillations in the CMB anisotropy angular power spectrum from the MAT/TOCO, BOOMERANG, and Maxima Experiments. The BOOMERanG experiment makes higher quality maps at intermediate resolution, and confirms that the universe is "flat".
- 2002 – Polarization discovered by DASI.
- 2003 – E-mode polarization spectrum obtained by the CBI. The CBI and the Very Small Array produces yet higher quality maps at high resolution (covering small areas of the sky).
- 2003 – The Wilkinson Microwave Anisotropy Probe spacecraft produces an even higher quality map at low and intermediate resolution of the whole sky (WMAP provides no high-resolution data, but improves on the intermediate resolution maps from BOOMERanG).
- 2004 – E-mode polarization spectrum obtained by the CBI.
- 2004 – The Arcminute Cosmology Bolometer Array Receiver produces a higher quality map of the high resolution structure not mapped by WMAP.
- 2005 – The Arcminute Microkelvin Imager and the Sunyaev–Zel'dovich Array begin the first surveys for very high redshift clusters of galaxies using the Sunyaev–Zel'dovich effect.
- 2005 – Ralph A. Alpher is awarded the National Medal of Science for his groundbreaking work in nucleosynthesis and prediction that the universe expansion leaves behind background radiation, thus providing a model for the Big Bang theory.
- 2006 – The long-awaited three-year WMAP results are released, confirming previous analysis, correcting several points, and including polarization data.
- 2006 – Two of COBE's principal investigators, George Smoot and John Mather, received the Nobel Prize in Physics in 2006 for their work on precision measurement of the CMBR.
- 2006–2011 – Improved measurements from WMAP, new supernova surveys ESSENCE and SNLS, and baryon acoustic oscillations from SDSS and WiggleZ, continue to be consistent with the standard Lambda-CDM model.
- 2010 – The first all-sky map from the Planck telescope is released.
- 2013 – An improved all-sky map from the Planck telescope is released, improving the measurements of WMAP and extending them to much smaller scales.
- 2014 – On March 17, 2014, astrophysicists of the BICEP2 collaboration announced the detection of inflationary gravitational waves in the B-mode power spectrum, which if confirmed, would provide clear experimental evidence for the theory of inflation. However, on 19 June 2014, lowered confidence in confirming the cosmic inflation findings was reported.
- 2015 – On January 30, 2015, the same team of astronomers from BICEP2 withdrew the claim made on the previous year. Based on the combined data of BICEP2 and Planck, the European Space Agency announced that the signal can be entirely attributed to dust in the Milky Way.
- 2018 – The final data and maps from the Planck telescope is released, with improved measurements of the polarization on large scales.
- 2019 – Planck telescope analyses of their final 2018 data continue to be released.

== In popular culture ==
Fanciful naming of CMB's most prominent features after the constellations located in the same region of the sky, inspired by Minute physics

- In the Stargate Universe TV series (2009–2011), an ancient spaceship, Destiny, was built to study patterns in the CMBR which is a sentient message left over from the beginning of time.
- In Wheelers, a novel (2000) by Ian Stewart & Jack Cohen, CMBR is explained as the encrypted transmissions of an ancient civilization. This allows the Jovian "blimps" to have a society older than the currently-observed age of the universe.
- In The Three-Body Problem, a 2008 novel by Liu Cixin, a probe from an alien civilization compromises instruments monitoring the CMBR in order to deceive a character into believing the civilization has the power to manipulate the CMBR itself.
- The 2017 issue of the Swiss 20 francs bill lists several astronomical objects with their distances – the CMB is mentioned with 430 · 10^{15} light-seconds.
- In the 2021 Marvel series WandaVision, a mysterious television broadcast is discovered within the Cosmic Microwave Background.

== See also ==
- Axis of evil (cosmology) – Anomaly in cosmic microwave background
- Cosmic neutrino background – Universe's background particle radiation composed of neutrinos
- Cosmic microwave background spectral distortions – Fluctuations in the energy spectrum of the microwave background
- Cosmological perturbation theory – Theory of the evolution of cosmological structure
- Gravitational wave background – Random background of gravitational waves permeating the Universe
- Heat death of the universe – Possible fate of the universe
- Horizons: Exploring the Universe – Astronomy textbook
- Lambda-CDM model – Mathematical model of the Big Bang
- List of cosmological computation software
- Non-standard cosmology – Models of the universe which deviate from then-current scientific consensus
- Observational cosmology – Study of the origin of the universe (structure and evolution)
- Observation history of galaxies – System of stars and interstellar matter
- Physical cosmology – Branch of physics that studies mathematical models of the universe
- Timeline of cosmological theories
