= Millimeter Anisotropy eXperiment IMaging Array =

Balloon package that measured the Universe's geometry

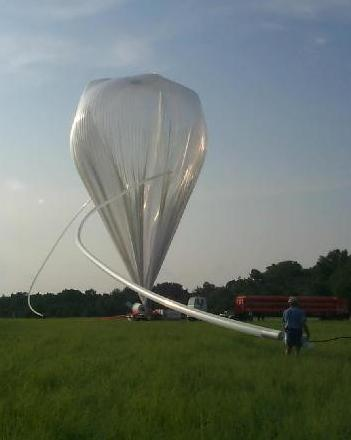
- The Maxima balloon is readied for launch
- Location: United States
- Coordinates: 31°46′48″N 95°43′22″W
- Website: cosmology.berkeley.edu/group/cmb/
- Location within the United States
- Related media on Commons

The Millimeter Anisotropy eXperiment IMaging Array (MAXIMA) experiment was a balloon-borne experiment funded by the United States NSF, NASA, and Department of Energy, and operated by an international collaboration headed by the University of California, to measure the fluctuations of the cosmic microwave background. It consisted of two flights, one in August 1998 and one in June 1999. For each flight the balloon was started at the Columbia Scientific Balloon Facility in Palestine, Texas and flew to an altitude of 40,000 metres for over 8 hours. For the first flight it took data from about 0.3 percent of the sky of the northern region near the constellation Draco. For the second flight, known as MAXIMA-II, twice the area was observed, this time in the direction of Ursa Major.

Initially planned together with the BOOMERanG experiment, it split off during the planning phase to take a less risky approach by reducing flying time as well as launching and landing on U.S. territory.

== Instrumentation ==
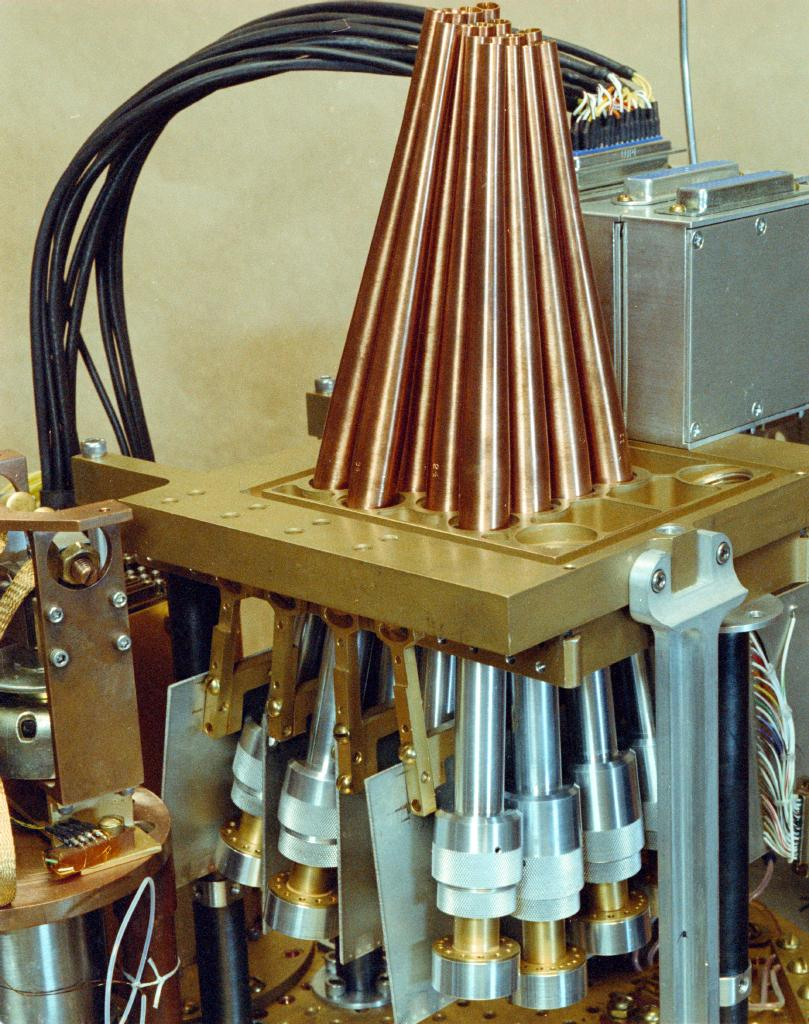
MAXIMA's feed horns and bolometers

A 1.3-metre primary mirror, along with a smaller secondary and tertiary mirror, was used to focus the microwaves onto the feed horns. The feed horns had spectral bands centred at 150, 240 and 420 GHz with a resolution of 10 arcminutes. A bolometer array consisting of sixteen NTD-Ge thermistors measured the incident radiation.

The detector array was cooled to 100 mK via a four-stage refrigeration process. Liquid nitrogen cooled the outer layer of radiation shielding and He-4 was used to cool the two other layers to a temperature of 2–3 K. Finally liquid He-3 cooled the array down to operation temperature. The shielding, together with the properties of the feed horns, gave a sensitivity of 40 uV/s^{1/2}.

Two CCD cameras were used to provide accurate measurements of the telescope's orientation. The first wide-field camera pointed towards Polaris and gave a coarse orientation up to 15 arcminutes. The other camera was mounted in the primary focus and gave an accuracy of half an arcminute for stars brighter than 6th magnitude. In total, this produced an overall position tracking accuracy of 10' for the telescope.

For pointing the telescope, four motors were used.

== Results ==
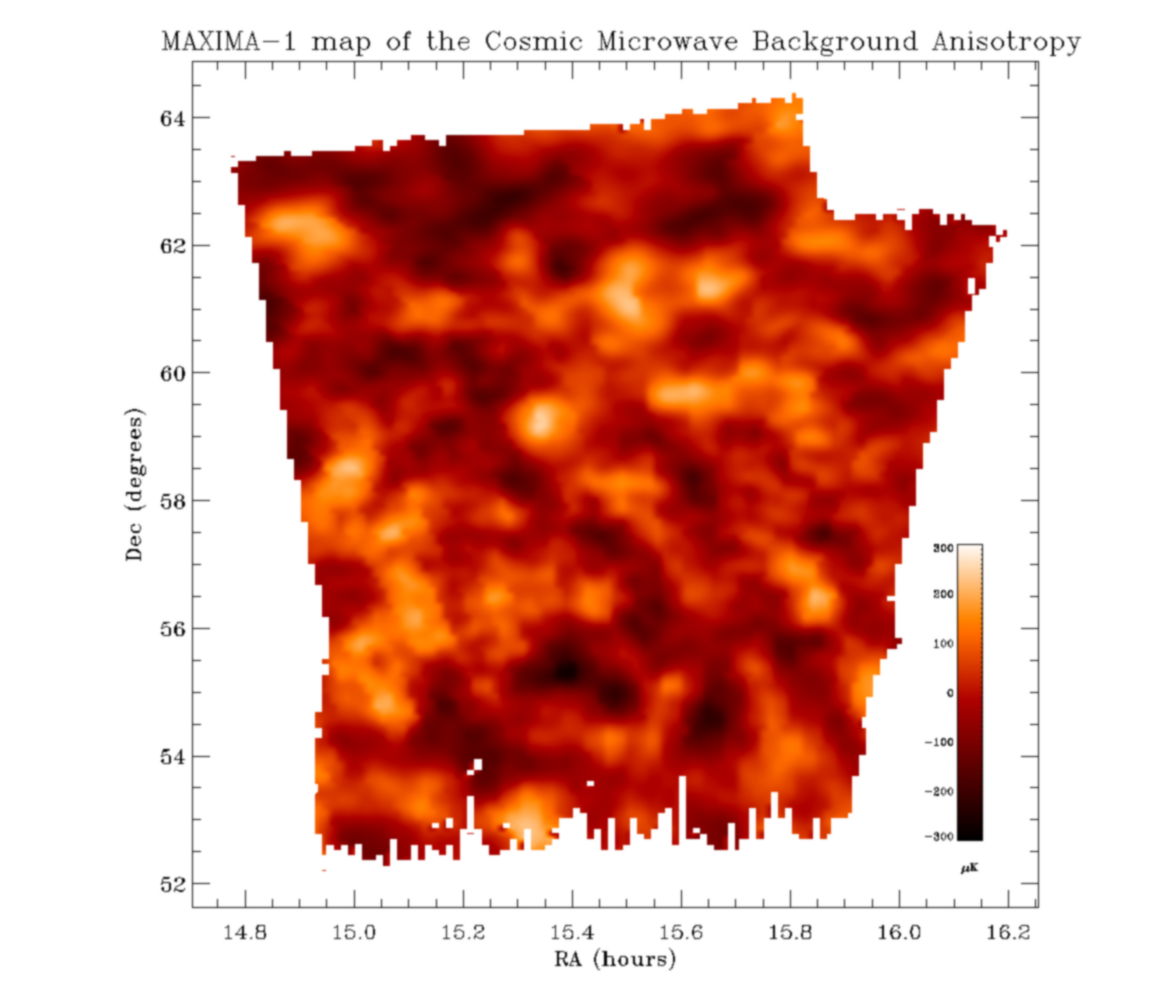
MAXIMA CMB fluctuations map

Compared to MAXIMA's competitor the BOOMERanG experiment, MAXIMA's data covers a smaller part of the sky but with much more detail. By the end of the year 2000 the experiment had provided the most accurate measurements of the Cosmic microwave background (CMB) fluctuations on small angular scales. Using this data it was possible to calculate the first three acoustic peaks from the CMB power spectrum. The results confirmed the standard cosmological model, giving a baryon density of about 4%, which agrees with the density calculated from Big Bang nucleosynthesis. The measurement of the flatness of the Universe also confirmed a major prediction of inflationary cosmology, although BOOMERang was the first to discover this.

== See also ==
- Cosmic microwave background experiments
- Observational cosmology
