= Arcminute Cosmology Bolometer Array Receiver =

Measure the anisotropy of the Cosmic microwave background

- Location: Antarctic Treaty area
- Coordinates: 89°59′30″S 44°30′00″W
- Wavelength: 145 GHz (2.07 mm)
- Website: bolo.berkeley.edu/holzapfel_group/acbar/
- Location within Antarctica

ACBAR was an experiment to measure the anisotropy of the Cosmic microwave background. It was active 2000-2008.

The ACBAR 145 GHz measurements were the most precise high multipole measurements of the CMB at the time.

== See also ==
- Cosmic microwave background experiments
- Observational cosmology
