= Licancabur =

Stratovolcano on the Bolivia–Chile border

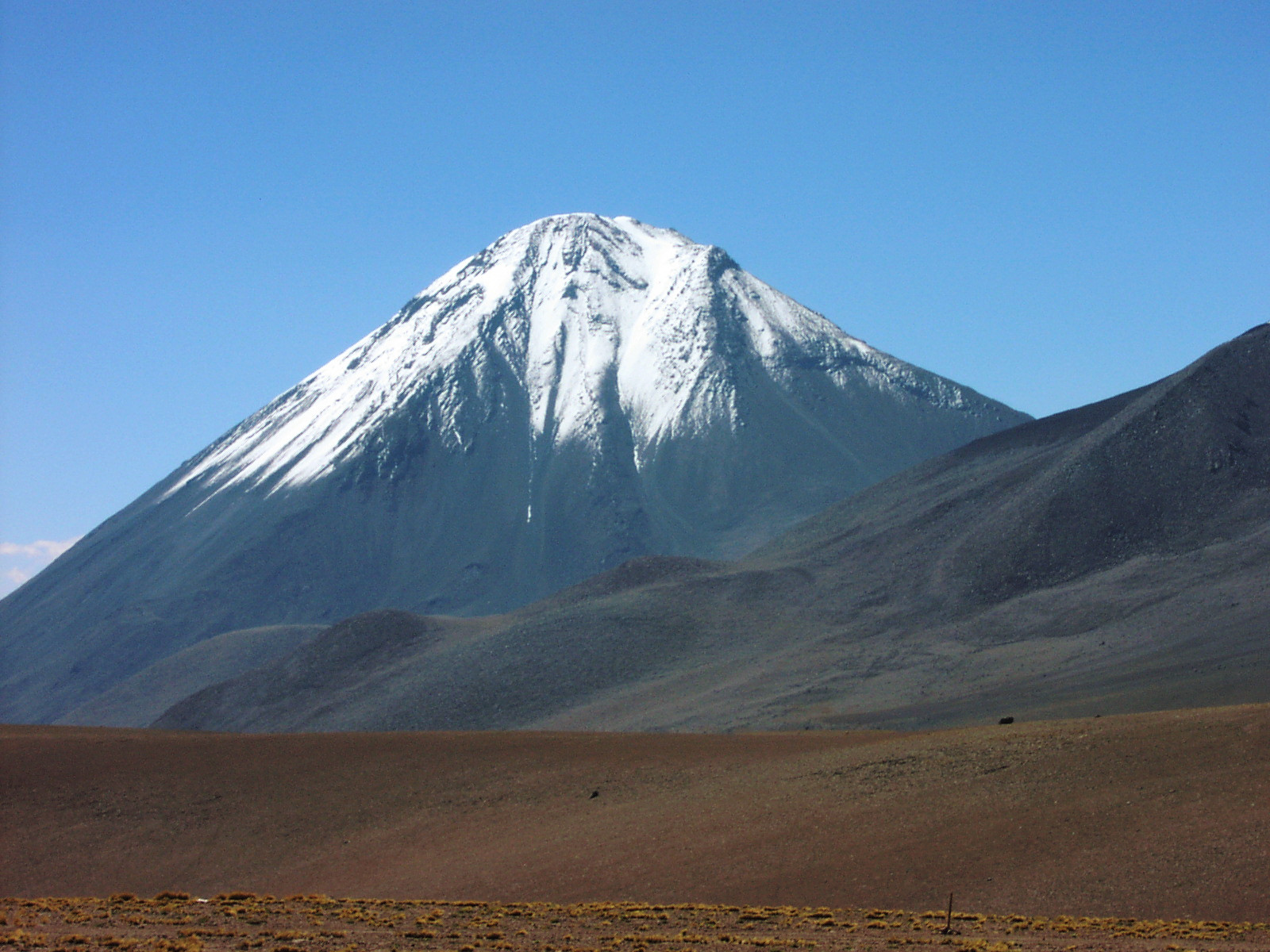

Highest point
- Elevation: 5,916 m (19,409 ft)
- Parent peak: Sairecabur
- Isolation: 12.6 km (7.8 mi) to Sairecabur (Note: Direct measurement with Google Earth, Line Ruler tool)
- Coordinates: 22°50′2″S 67°53′1″W

Geography
- Location within Bolivia
- Location: Bolivia / Chile
- Parent range: Andes

Geology
- Rock age: Holocene
- Mountain type: Stratovolcano
- Last eruption: Unknown

Climbing
- First ascent: Inca, pre-Columbian
- Easiest route: Hike

Licancabur (Spanish pronunciation: [likaŋkaˈβuɾ]) is a prominent, 5,916-metre-high (19,409 ft) stratovolcano on the Bolivia–Chile border in the Central Volcanic Zone of the Andes. It is capped by a 400–500-metre-wide (1,300–1,600 ft) summit crater which contains Licancabur Lake, a crater lake that is among the highest lakes in the world. There are no glaciers owing to the arid climate. Numerous plants and animal species live on the mountain. The volcanoes Sairecabur and Juriques are north and east of Licancabur, respectively.

Licancabur formed on top of ignimbrites produced by other volcanoes, and has been active during the Holocene. Three stages of lava flows emanated from the edifice and have a young appearance. Although no historical eruptions of the volcano are known, lava flows extending into Laguna Verde have been dated to 13,240±100 years before present, and there may be residual heat in the mountain. The volcano has primarily erupted andesite, with small amounts of dacite and basaltic andesite.

Several archaeological sites have been found on the mountain, on both its summit and northeastern foot. They are thought to have been constructed by the Inca or Atacama people for religious and cultural ceremonies and are among the most important in the region. The mountain is the subject of myths in which it is viewed as the husband of another mountain, a hiding place used by the Inca, or the burial of an Inca king.

== Etymology and importance ==
The name Licancabur comes from the Kunza language, in which lican means "people" or "town" and cábur/, caur, caure or cauri mean "mountain". The name may refer to the archaeological sites on the mountain. The name of the volcano has also been translated as "upper village". Other names are Licancáguar, Licancaur, Lincancabur, Tata Likanku and Volcán de Atacama.

Licancabur is one of the widely known volcanoes within Bolivia and Chile (Note: It is one of the volcanoes depicted on Chilean passports.) and can be seen from San Pedro de Atacama. The region was conquered by the Inca in the 14th century and by the Spanish during the 16th century. Today it is of interest for research on animal health, remote sensing, telecommunication, and the fact that the environment around Licancabur may be the closest equivalent to Mars that exists on Earth, while current conditions at its lakes resemble those believed to have existed at former lakes on Mars.

== Geography and geomorphology ==
The volcano is in the Puna de Atacama and Cordillera Occidental of the Andes. The frontier between Bolivia and Chile goes over Licancabur; (Note: The Treaty of Valparaiso explicitly places the frontier over the mountain.) the Chilean portion is in the Antofagasta Region and the Bolivian in the Potosí Department. Toward the southeast is the Llano de Chajnantor Observatory. San Pedro de Atacama is 32 kilometres (20 mi) west of Licancabur while the adjacent region in Bolivia is largely uninhabited. The border crossing Paso de Jama and Chile Route 27 between Argentina and Chile passes along the southern foot of Licancabur. In 1953, a road was built by yareta cutters that reached an elevation of 4,300 metres (14,000 ft).

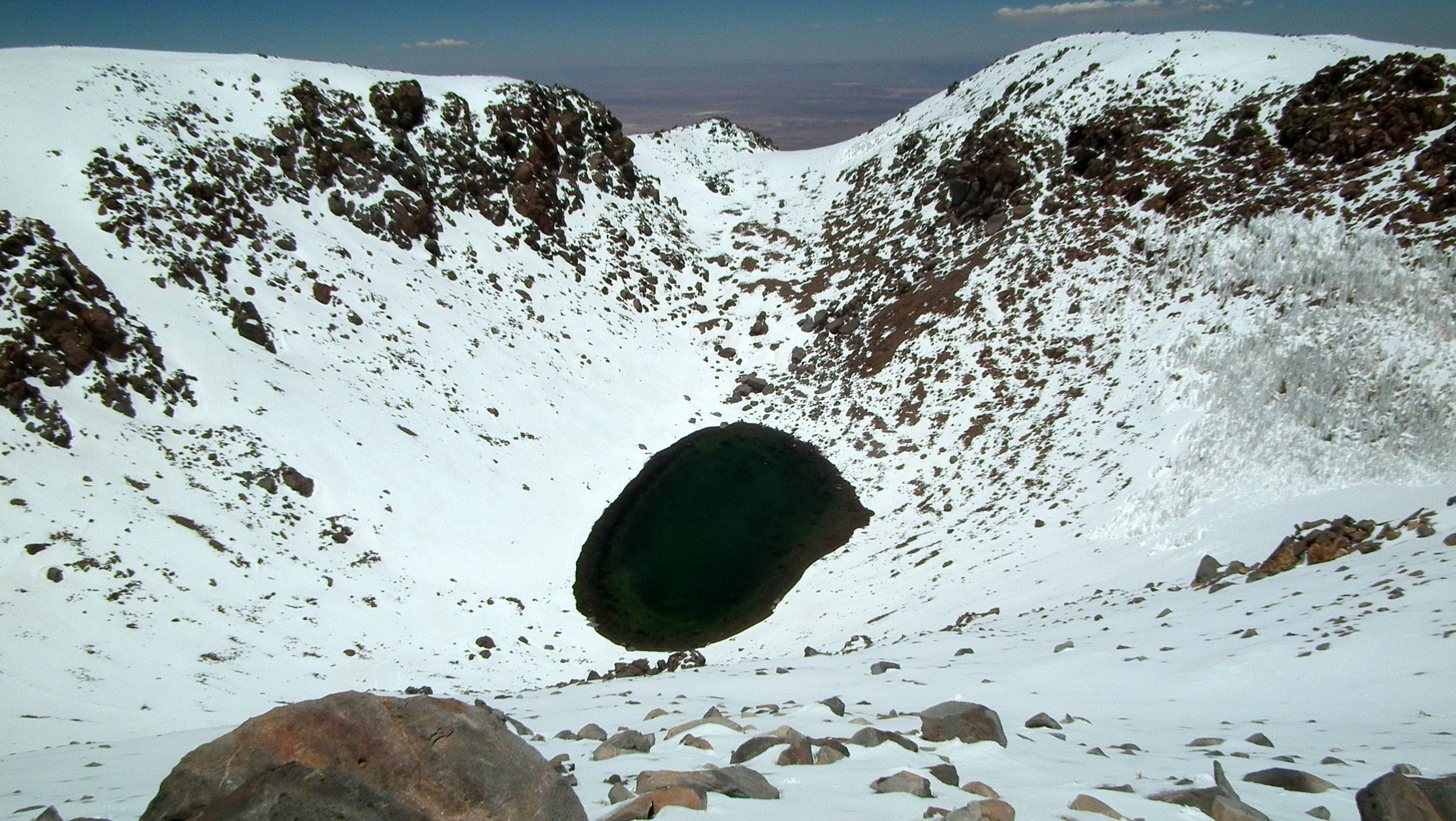
Licancabur Lake at the bottom of the crater

Licancabur is a 1.5-kilometre-high (0.9 mi) and 9-kilometre-wide (6 mi) uneroded symmetrical cone with steep slopes. The cone is formed by layers of lava and pyroclastics, and there are traces of lahars. The mountain dominates its surroundings. The summit, 5,916 metres (19,409 ft) in elevation, (Note: Other elevations have been reported, including heights exceeding 6,000 metres (20,000 ft).) features a 500-metre-wide (1,600 ft) or 400-metre-wide (1,300 ft) summit crater. The 70-by-90-metre (230 ft × 300 ft) freshwater Licancabur Lake in the crater is one of the highest lakes in the world. The total volume of the volcano was estimated in 1996 to be 35 cubic kilometres (8 cu mi); a 2012 study estimated it to be 44 cubic kilometres (11 cu mi).

Young-looking black-grey lava flows emanate from the summit crater and surround the cone, reaching distances of 15 kilometres (9 mi) from the summit west of Licancabur. The flows are 10-to-50-metre-thick (33 to 164 ft) block lavas, and feature structures like ridges, levees and blocks several metres thick. A debris avalanche deposit is found on the western side of Licancabur. The slopes of the mountain are unstable.

The landscape around the volcano consists of basins separated by mountain chains. At the northeastern foot of Licancabur is Laguna Verde. The mountain is part of the drainage divide between the Altiplano and the Salar de Atacama. Southwest of Licancabur are the Vilama and San Pedro rivers, which flow to San Pedro de Atacama.

== Geology ==
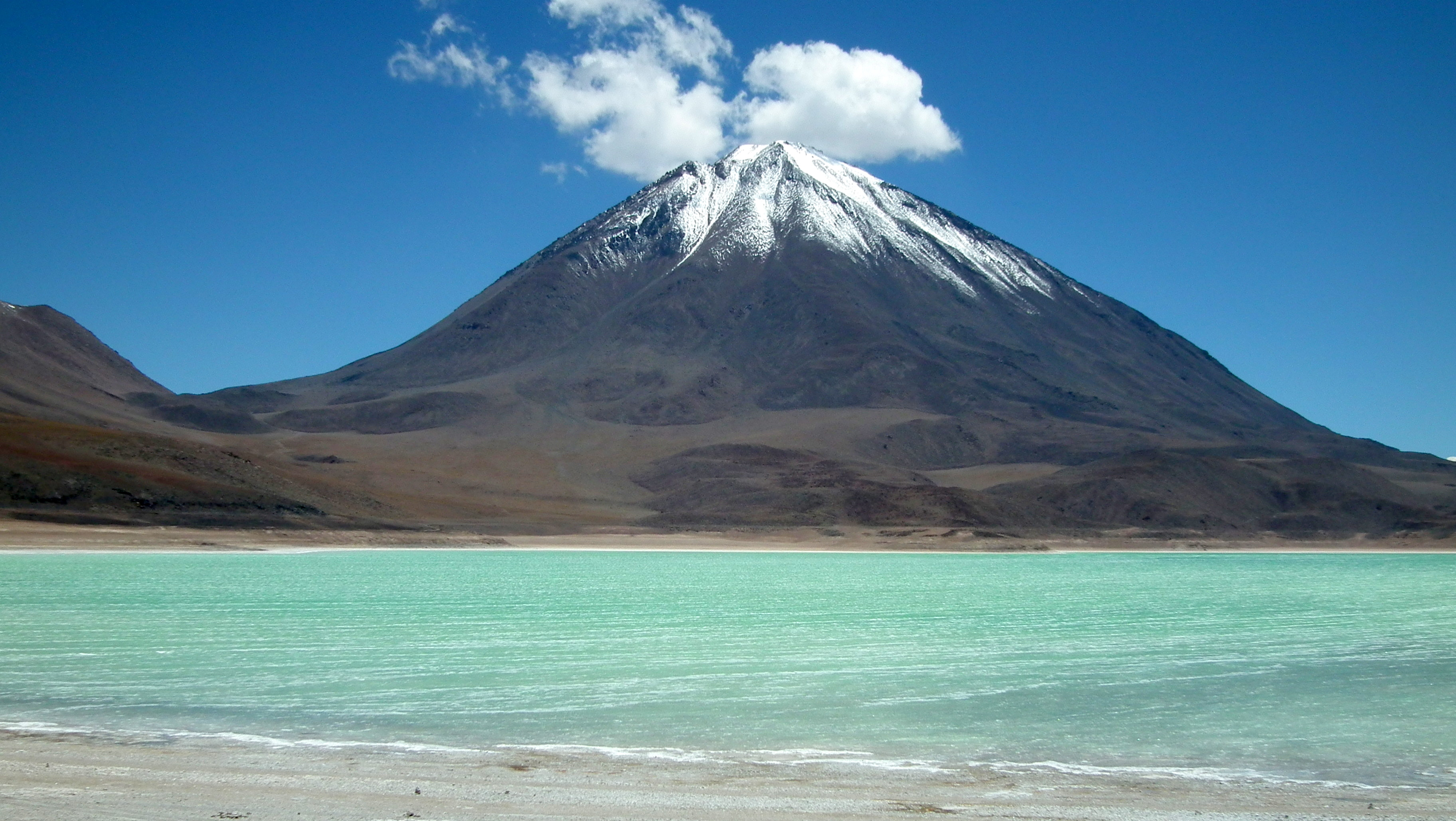
Licancabur across Laguna Verde at more than 4,000 m (13,123 ft) elevation

Since the Jurassic period, the Farallon Plate and later the Nazca Plate have been subducting under the South American Plate in the Peru–Chile Trench. This subduction is ongoing at a rate of 6.6 centimetres per year (2.6 in/year) and is responsible for the volcanism in the Andes, as fluids emanating from the downgoing plate trigger melting within the overlying asthenosphere. The Andean Central Volcanic Zone (CVZ) extends from southern Peru to cover Bolivia, Chile and Argentina, and contains the highest volcano in the world—Ojos del Salado. The region also includes the Altiplano–Puna volcanic complex, one of the largest known ignimbrite provinces. Licancabur is part of the southern CVZ, where there are over a thousand volcanoes. Older (Miocene) volcanoes are widespread, while Pleistocene–Holocene systems are concentrated in the main volcanic chain. The volcano Lascar erupts every few years.

The volcanic chain continues north across the Portezuelo Chaxas mountain pass, beginning with Sairecabur. To the southeast is 5,704-metre-high (18,714 ft) Juriques, which formed during the Pleistocene and has a 1.5-kilometre-wide (0.93 mi) summit crater; the two volcanoes form an offset in the volcanic chain. Farther south next to Portezuelo del Cajon is Cerro Toco of the Purico complex.

Licancabur is on the edge of the Altiplano, next to the Salar de Atacama basin. The basement contains intrusions of Paleozoic and sedimentary rocks of Mesozoic age, forming the "Antofalla domain" of the Arequipa-Antofalla tectonic block that originated separately from South America. Between 4 kilometres (2.5 mi) and 30 kilometres (19 mi) depth is the Altiplano-Puna Magma Body, a giant magma chamber that extends under the southern Altiplano and to Licancabur. At the volcano, the basement is covered by ignimbrites from the Chaxas, La Pacana, and Purico volcanoes and lava domes of dacitic-rhyodacitic composition. Ignimbrites crop out in gorges south of Licancabur, and the Chaxas complex is exposed just northwest of Licancabur. Faults associated with the Calama-Olacapato-El Toro lineament cut through the basement in southeast direction and probably influenced the growth of Licancabur and Juriques. Some faults were active during the Holocene.

=== Composition ===
Andesites are the main rocks at Licancabur, with some basaltic andesite and dacite. They define an adakite-like suite and are less crystalline than the rocks of other CVZ volcanoes. The lavas were highly viscous, which is why the Licancabur cone is so steep. The main phenocryst phase is plagioclase, while amphibole, clinopyroxene, iron-titanium oxides, olivine, and orthopyroxene are subordinate. Xenoliths of gabbro are found within the rocks. Unlike many neighbouring volcanoes, Licancabur lacks sulfur deposits.

Licancabur is built from magma formed through the melting of altered oceanic crust in the slab at 50–100 kilometres (31–62 mi) depth, which in turn leads to melting in the mantle wedge around 100–200 kilometres (62–124 mi) depth that gives rise to the Licancabur magmas. Magma mixing, assimilation of continental crustal rocks, and fractional crystallization of amphibole and garnet would explain trace element patterns. Distinct mineral populations develop in the outer parts of the magma chamber, yielding magma with multiple crystal populations.

== Climate and vegetation ==
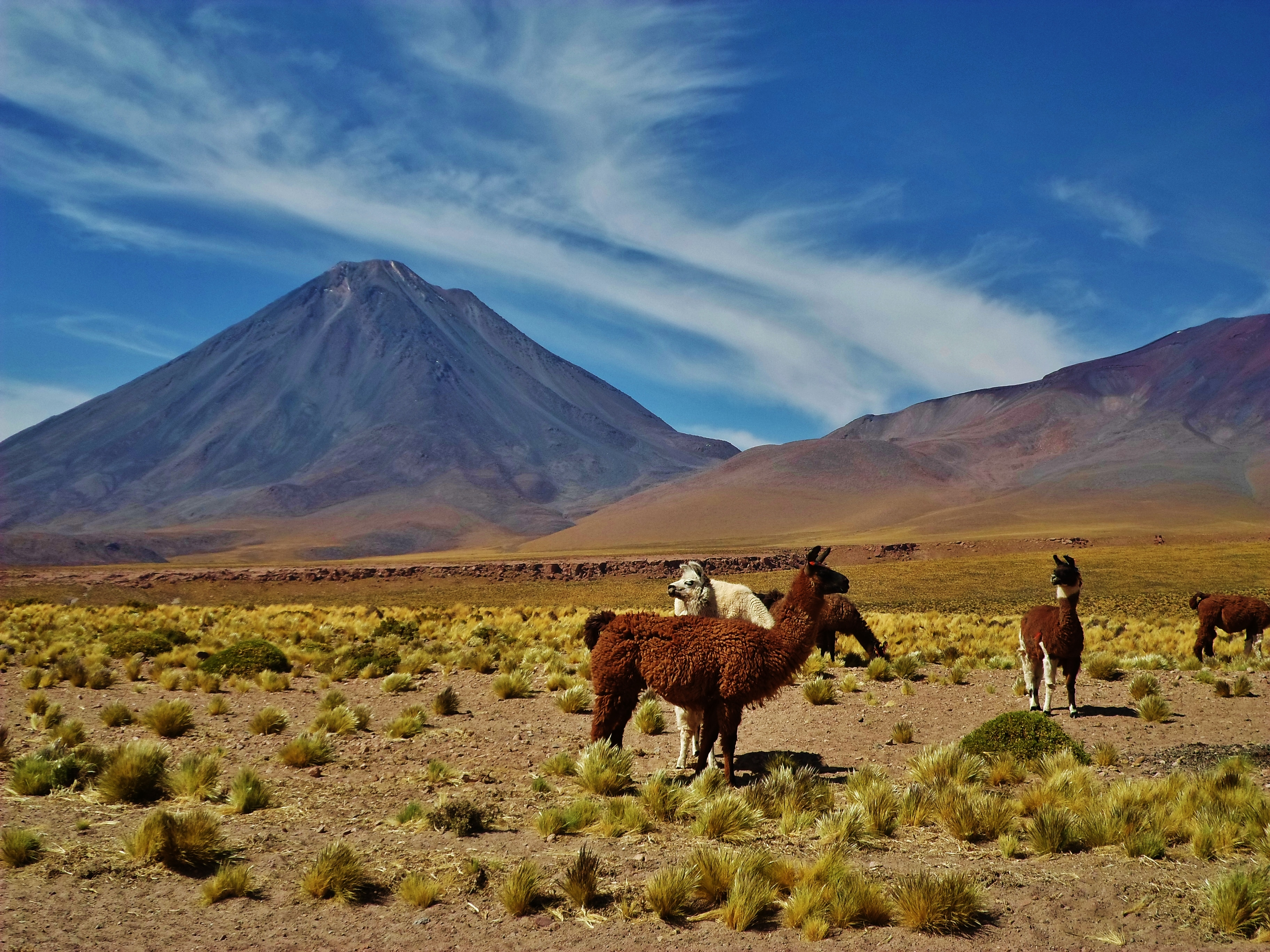
Llamas and vegetation in front of Licancabur

The climate is cold, dry, and windy, with low atmospheric pressure and large day-night temperature differences. Daytime temperatures on the summit range from 5 °C (41 °F) to −25 °C (−13 °F) and at nighttime between −25 °C (−13 °F) and −40 °C (−40 °F). Annual mean precipitation reaches 360 millimetres (14 in), decreasing to 200 millimetres (7.9 in) at its base, but is highly variable. The Atacama Desert is one of the driest on Earth, and as a result, snow cover on Licancabur is ephemeral and there are no glaciers. During the local Last Glacial Maximum, the snowline may have decreased to 4,000–4,800 metres (13,100–15,700 ft) elevation, but there is no evidence of glacial activity on Licancabur. Periglacial phenomena, such as frost weathering, inactive rock glaciers, and solifluction, have been reported from neighbouring mountains. The region of the Altiplano next to Llano de Chajnantor and the Cordillera Domeyko likely has Earth's highest insolation rate. (Note: Claims that the UV index at Licancabur can reach values exceeding 40 have drawn scrutiny, as such high UV indices may not be plausible within Earth's atmosphere even accounting for UV radiation reflected by clouds.)

Plants on Licancabur include grasses, tola, and yareta. Cushion plants and tussocks dominate at elevations of 3,850–4,200 metres (12,630–13,780 ft), and widely spaced shrubs between 2,700–3,100 metres (8,900–10,200 ft). The highest plant density is found at elevations between these belts. Some areas are used as pastures. Isolated wetlands occur at the foot of the volcano.

The fauna includes birds (such as black-hooded sierra finch, black-winged ground dove, and puna tinamou), frogs (Rhinella spinulosa), insects (butterflies, cuckoo bees, (Note: A species of cuckoo bee has been named after the volcano.) and flies), lizards (Liolaemus audituvelatus, L. barbarae, L. constanzae, L. fabiani, and L. puritamensis), mammals (Andean hairy armadillo, chinchilla, culpeo, guanaco, southern vizcacha, and vicuña), and toads (Telmatobius vilamensis). The Bolivian sector is part of the Eduardo Avaroa Andean Fauna National Reserve. In Chile, there were plans to create a protected area including Licancabur and El Tatio, but as of 2018 no progress had been made.

== Volcanic history ==
The volcano formed mostly during the Late Pleistocene–Holocene, and bears no traces of glacial erosion (Note: Although this may be because the volcano is too steep for glacier formation.). Three generations of lava-flow units are distinguishable from their appearance and chemistry. The basal unit crops out at the western and northeastern foot and consists of the earliest magma, the intermediate unit forms most of the western and southern sectors, and the upper unit forms the central cone and represents the most differentiated magmas. The older flows, north and west of Licancabur, overlap with flows from Sairecabur and are partly buried by debris-avalanche deposits and moraines. Activity at Licancabur impacted the environment at Laguna Verde, where the concentration of silicon dioxide and other oxides in the water increased.

An earlier explosive eruption produced pyroclastic flows. The lava flows on the slopes are the most recent activity. There are no known historical or Holocene eruptions, and the age of its latest eruption is unknown; the only dated activity is lava which overran the 13240±100-year-old shorelines at Laguna Verde. The preservation of Inca ruins in the summit implies that Licancabur has been inactive for 600–1000 years. However, the elevated temperatures in the crater imply that the volcano is still generating heat. Licancabur is thus considered to be potentially active, although SERNAGEOMIN deems it to be low-hazard, and as of 2023 placed it as the 68th most dangerous volcano in Chile, out of a total of 87. Given the volcano is remote from inhabited areas, renewed activity would have little impact.

== Archaeology and religious importance ==
Prehistoric manmade constructions are widespread on the mountains of the region, including Licancabur and Juriques, and Licancabur features one of the most complex constructions. It includes a ceremonial platform and multiple structures with mostly semicircular or rectangular shapes, all in the eastern part of the crater. The structures may have had roofs and are built like pircas (without mortar). Reports from 1887 and 1955 mention piles of wood. A stone semicircle surrounding an upright stone has been compared to an Incan altar known as an ushnu. The sites on the summit were presumably used for equinox and solstice feasts. No human sacrifices (capacocha) are associated with Licancabur.

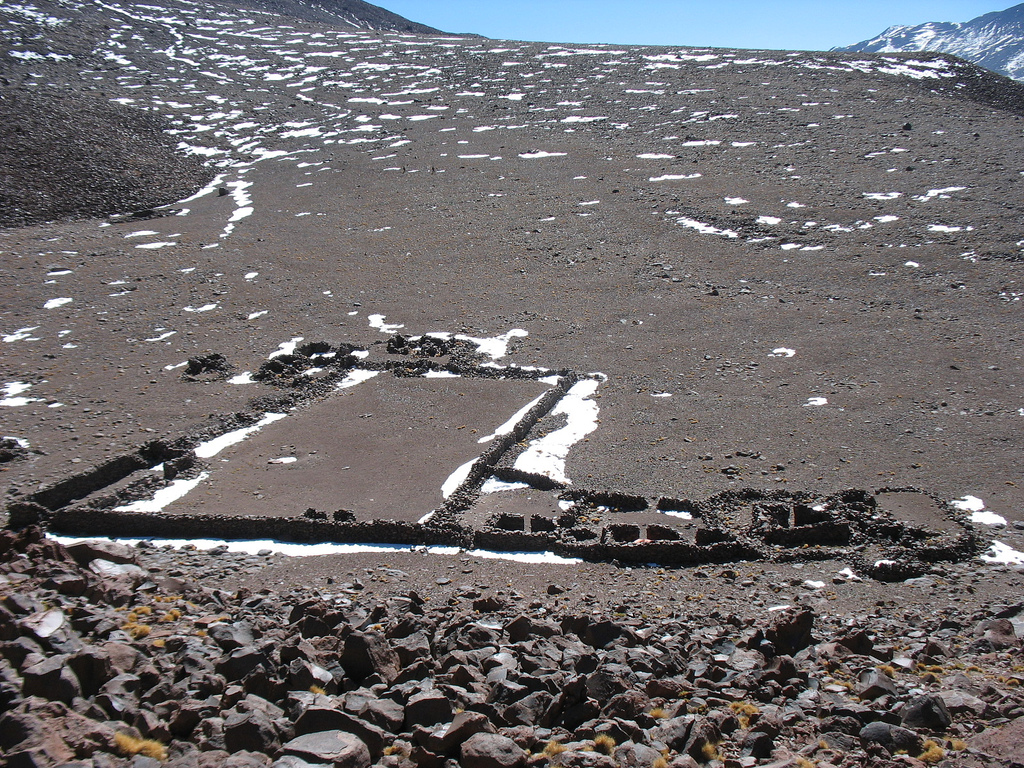
Ruins at the foot of Licancabur

Another site, Tambo de Licancabur or Tambo Licancabur, lies at an elevation of 4,600 metres (15,100 ft) at the northeastern foot of Licancabur. It consists of over a hundred man-made structures and a 70-metre-long (230 ft) public square. More than a hundred people could stay at Tambo de Licancabur, which was not permanently inhabited. Both Inca and local pottery styles have been found there. From Tambo de Licancabur, a zig-zag path led up to the mountain; there are further Inca structures on this path, Tambo de Licancabur was visible from these structures; today the path is largely destroyed or blocked by landslides. Tambo de Licancabur has been interpreted either as a site where, during festivities, people who could not ascend the mountain congregated – a base camp, corpahuasi – or as a tambo, an Inca waystation, on the road between San Pedro de Atacama and Inca territories in present-day Bolivia. The two interpretations are not mutually exclusive. The whole Licancabur complex was one of the most important in the region, and may have been part of a wider regional religious centre. The archaeological sites on Licancabur are sometimes interpreted as part of a lookout system for the region, or as a symbol of Inca dominance in the San Pedro de Atacama area. The Inca road passed at the foot of the volcano, which made the site easily accessible.

The mountain was worshipped by the Atacameño and Inca until the 20th century. Licancabur was important in local cultural rituals, and was as of 2008 used in culturally important events. At least one burial in a local cemetery was oriented to Licancabur.

There are several legends tied to the mountain. Licancabur and Quimal, a mountain in the Cordillera Domeyko, were considered to be married; Licancabur was the male and Quimal the female partner. The two are considered paramount mountains which protect the local communities and fertilise the ground during their copulation. In the local Atacameno mythology, the mountain controls fire (and the San Pedro volcano controls water), while in Socaire's mythology it is a source of water. Juriques however wanted to have Quimal for himself, and was decapitated by Licancabur. The enraged Lascar then separated Quimal from her children, and her tears formed the Salar de Atacama when they dried up. In another myth, Licancabur is the tomb of a legless Inca king who was carried around the region in a litter. A final tale says that once, the crater lake had fresh water. When Inca fled from white people to Licancabur, they hid their treasures, and the waters of the lake turned bitter and its colour green. Ascending the mountain was considered taboo, and according to legend the mountain vigorously defends against violations of its summit; allegedly the 1953 Calama earthquake was in retaliation for the ascent of the mountain in that year.

== Ascent ==
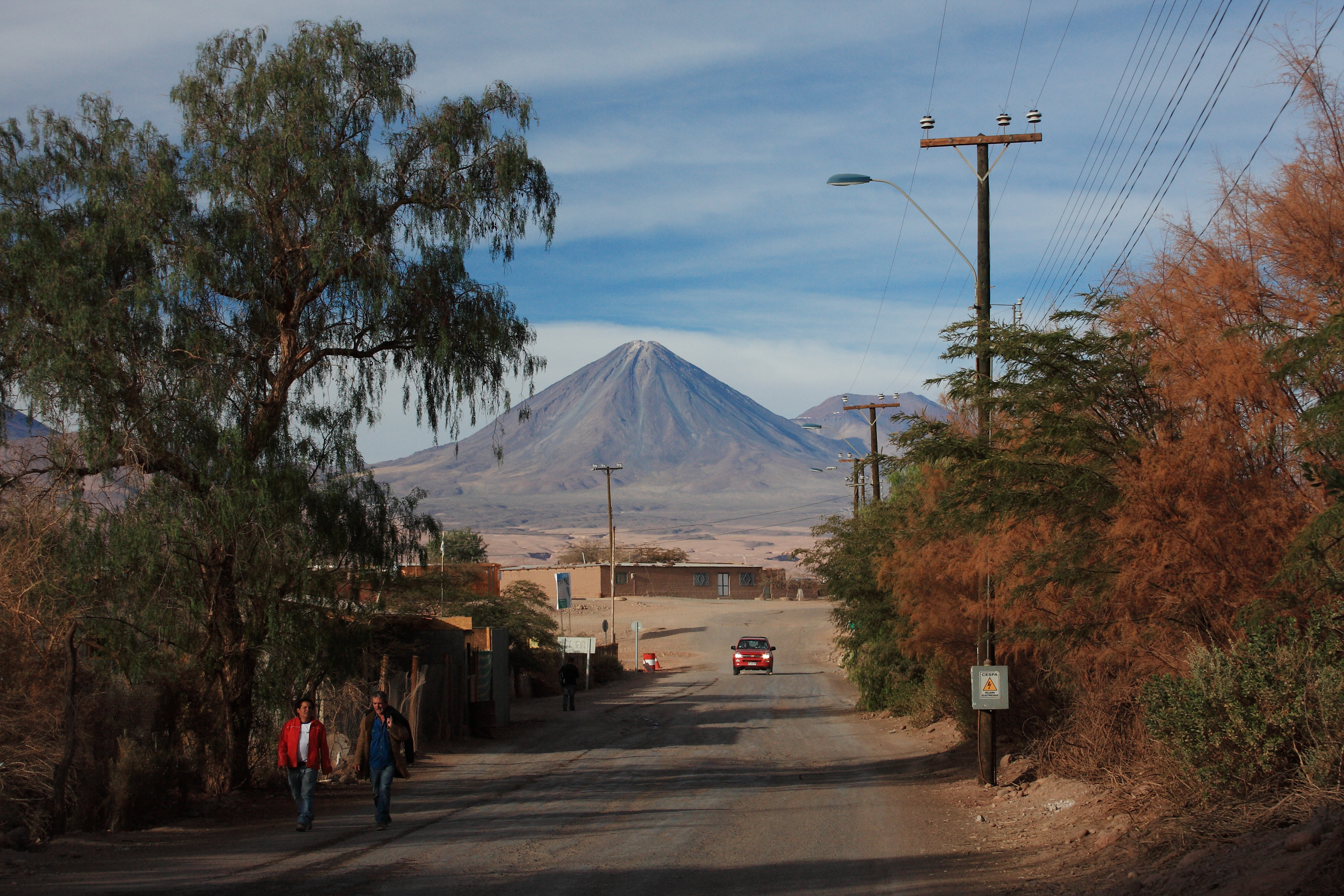
Licancabur, seen from the town of San Pedro de Atacama

The mountain was first ascended by either the Inca or the Atacameno people. The first documented ascent was by Severo Titichoca in November 1884. Climbers typically approach Licancabur from the Bolivian side. It can be ascended year round, although caution is needed during winter. Ascents take six hours; descents take about half that time. Poor weather conditions can quickly develop, and ascending can be difficult given the unstable slopes on the upper cone.

== Bibliography ==
- Biggar, Cathy; Biggar, John (2001). The Andes: A Trekking Guide. Andes. ISBN 978-0-9536087-1-3.
- Dillehay, Tom D.; Netherly, Patricia (1998). La Frontera del Estado Inca (in Spanish). Editorial Abya Yala. ISBN 978-9978-04-977-8.
- Mena, Mauricio (2018). El Licancabur tiene su historia, todos los cerros la tienen. Mitos, leyendas y fábulas altoandinas (in Spanish). San Pedro de Atacama: Ediciones del Desierto.
