= Streptomyces bullii =

Scientific classification
- Domain: Bacteria
- Kingdom: Bacillati
- Phylum: Actinomycetota
- Class: Actinomycetes
- Order: Streptomycetales
- Family: Streptomycetaceae
- Genus: Streptomyces
- Species: S. bullii

Binomial name
- Streptomyces bullii Santhanam et al. 2013

Type strain
- C2, CGMCC 4.7019, KACC 15426

Species of bacterium

Streptomyces bullii is a bacterium species from the genus of Streptomyces which has been isolated from soil from the Atacama Desert in Salar de Atacama in Chile.

== See also ==
- List of Streptomyces species
