= Portezuelo del Cajón =

Mountain pass on the border between Chile and Bolivia

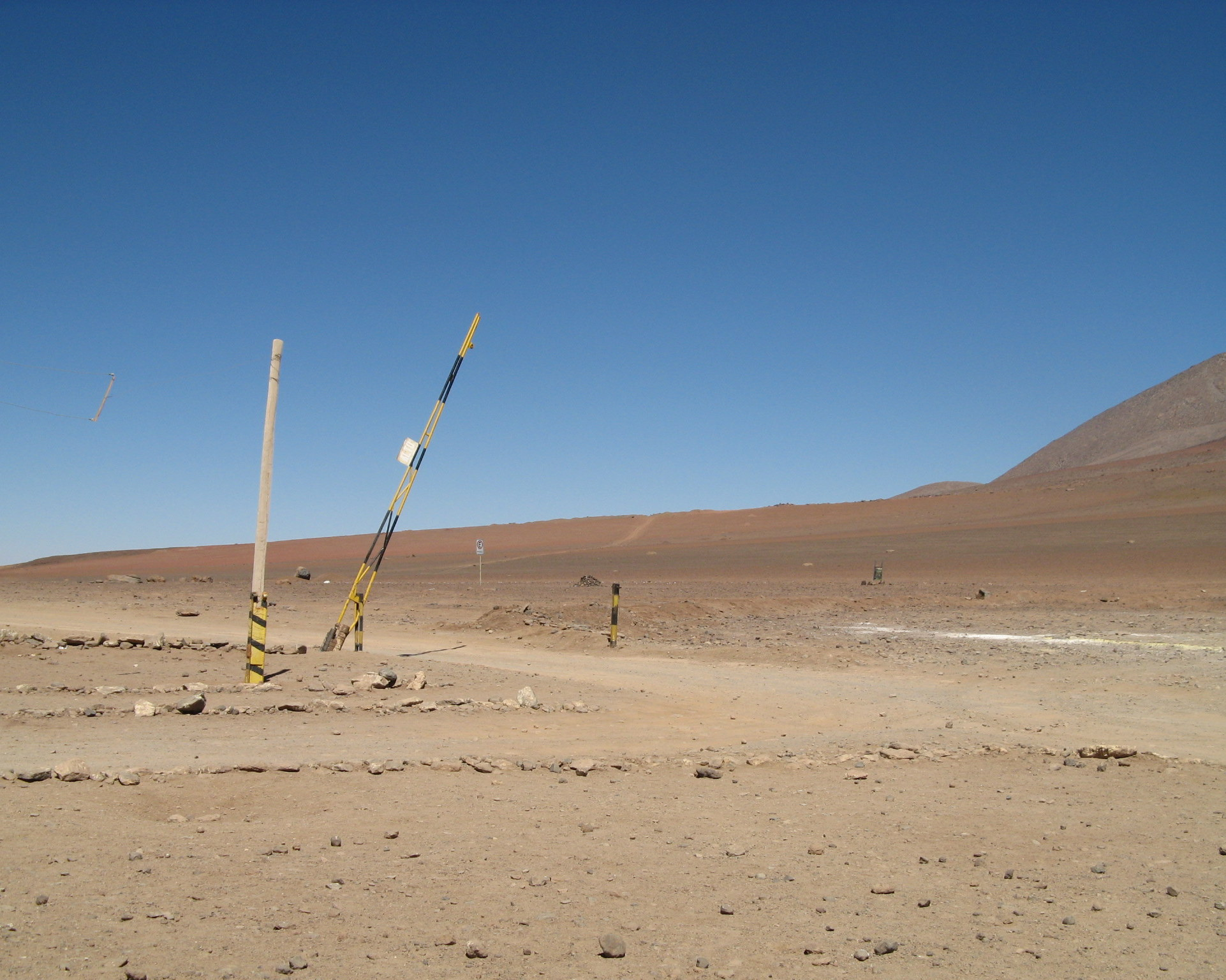
- Border post
- Interactive map of Portezuelo del Cajón
- Elevation: 4,480 metres (14,700 ft)

Third Approach
- Location: Bolivia–Chile border
- Range: Andes
- Coordinates: 22°52′51″S 67°47′54″W

Portezuelo del Cajón, also known as Hito Cajón, is a mountain pass on the border between Chile and Bolivia, located on the lower southeast flank of Juriques volcano, close to the Licancabur volcano. While Bolivian customs are completed at the top of the pass, Chilean customs are completed in the town of San Pedro de Atacama, 45 kilometres (28 mi) away. The road over the pass begins at the junction with Chile Route 27, close to Cerro Toco.

The Bolivian side of the border is in the Eduardo Avaroa Andean Fauna National Reserve, close to the Laguna Verde and to the Laguna Blanca. The crossing is frequently used by tourists travelling between Uyuni and San Pedro de Atacama.
