= Altitude diving =

Underwater diving at altitudes above 300 m

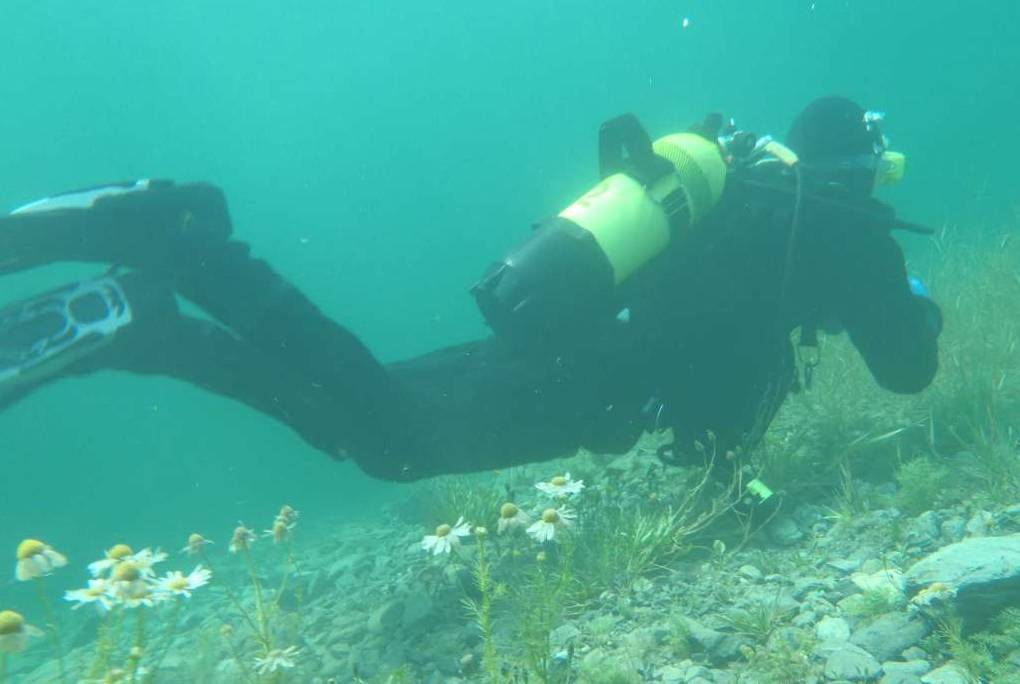
Scuba Diver in the mountain lake Lai da Marmorera 1,680 metres (5,510 ft) above sea level)

Altitude diving is ambient pressure diving using scuba or surface supplied diving equipment where the surface is 300 metres (980 ft) or more above sea level (for example, a mountain lake). Altitude is significant in diving because it affects the decompression requirement for a dive, so that the stop depths and decompression times used for dives at altitude are different from those used for the same dive profile at sea level. The U.S. Navy tables recommend that no alteration be made for dives at altitudes lower than 91 metres (299 ft) and for dives between 91 and 300 meters correction is required for dives deeper than 44 metres (144 ft) of sea water. Most recently manufactured decompression computers can automatically compensate for altitude.

== Measurement of depth at altitude ==
Special consideration must be given to measurement of depth given the effect of pressure on gauges. The use of bourdon tube, diaphragm, and digital depth gauges may require adjustment for use at altitude. Capillary gauges have been shown to be a conservative method for measurement of compensated depth at altitude. Modern dive computers detect changes in altitude or accept it as a user input and automatically adjust their calculation of a safe decompression regime for a dive at that altitude. If an altitude-aware computer is not used, altitude decompression tables must be used.

== Effects of altitude on buoyancy control and barotraumas ==
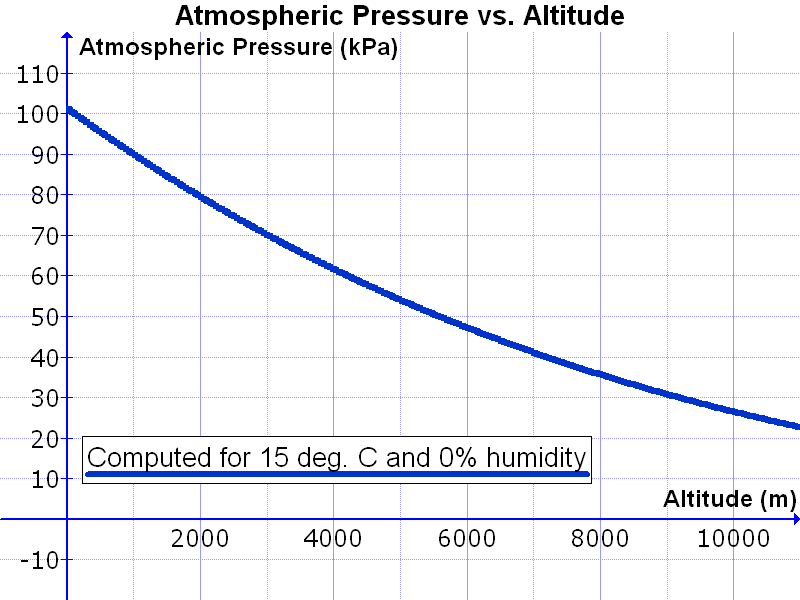
Variation in atmospheric pressure with altitude, computed for 15 °C and 0% relative humidity.

Buoyancy control is directly affected by volume change of gas with depth. The lower surface pressure causes larger volume change with the same change in depth relative to the surface compared to sea level conditions. As in the case for sea level diving, the ambient pressure at depth is the atmospheric pressure on the surface of the water plus the hydrostatic pressure due to the weight of the water column above that depth. The hydrostatic pressure increases in the same proportion to depth, but the atmospheric pressure varies with altitude. The lower initial pressure at the surface means that a mass of gas occupying a given volume will be compressed more than the same volume at sea level for the same depth. The formula for Boyle's law applies:

P_{1} V_{1} = P_{2} V_{2}
or: V_{2} = P_{1} V_{1}/P_{2}
or: V_{2}/V_{1} = P_{1}/P_{2}

Example:

At sea level P_{1} = 1 bar (approximately), and at 10 m depth at sea level P_{2} = 2 bar so V_{2}/V_{1} = 1/2 = 0.5

At altitude 3,000 feet (910 m), P_{1} = 0.7 bar (approximately), and at a depth of 10 m, P_{2} = 1.7 bar, so V_{2}/V_{1} = 0.7/1.7 = 0.412

As a consequence, dry suit squeeze, mask squeeze, and ear and sinus squeezes will all develop more rapidly at higher altitude. In most cases the difference will not be noticeable, as experienced divers tend to equalise most squeezes reflexively, but as an example, a dry suit without a functional inflation system will squeeze the diver shallower than would be the case at sea level, and more for the same water depth. For exactly the same reason, barotraumas of ascent can occur for slightly lower depth changes.

== Decompression when diving at altitude ==
At altitude, atmospheric pressure is lower than at sea level, so surfacing at the end of an altitude dive leads to a greater relative reduction in pressure and an increased risk of decompression sickness compared to the same dive profile at sea level. The dives are also typically carried out in freshwater at altitude so it has a lower density than seawater used for calculation of decompression tables. The amount of time the diver has spent acclimatising at altitude is also of concern as divers with gas loadings near those of sea level may also be at an increased risk. The US Navy recommends waiting 12 hours following arrival at altitude before performing the first dive. The tissue supersaturation following an ascent to altitude can also be accounted for by considering it to be residual nitrogen and allocating a residual nitrogen group when using tables with this facility.

=== Decompression tables ===
The most common of the modifications to decompression tables at altitude are the "Cross Corrections" which use a ratio of atmospheric pressure and sea level to that of the altitude to provide a conservative equivalent sea level depth. The Cross Corrections were later looked at by Bassett and by Bell and Borgwardt.

Hennessy formulated that it was possible to convert standard air decompression tables for no-stop diving at altitude or from a habitat based on phase equilibration theory.

Albert A. Bühlmann recognized the problem and proposed a method which calculated maximum nitrogen loading in the tissues at a particular ambient pressure.

Wienke proposed guidelines for decompression diving at altitude in 1993.

Egi and Brubakk reviewed various models for preparing tables for diving at altitude.

Paulev and Zubieta have created a new conversion factor in order to make any sea-level dive table usable during high altitude diving in 2007.

=== Repetitive diving ===
Repetitive dives should be conducted in the same manner as other dives including "Cross Corrections" for altitude. The US Navy does not allow repetitive diving for surface-supplied helium-oxygen diving and a 12-hour surface interval is required. An 18-hour surface interval is required if the dive requires decompression.

=== Pre- and post-dive ascents ===
In addition to making depth adjustments using the Cross Conversions, dives at altitude often require pre- and post-dive altitude ascents which must be taken into consideration. Several methods for performing post-dive ascents are used. One is to adjust the dive times needed for an altitude ascent. Another is to use surface intervals to allow for an ascent.

== Extreme altitude diving ==
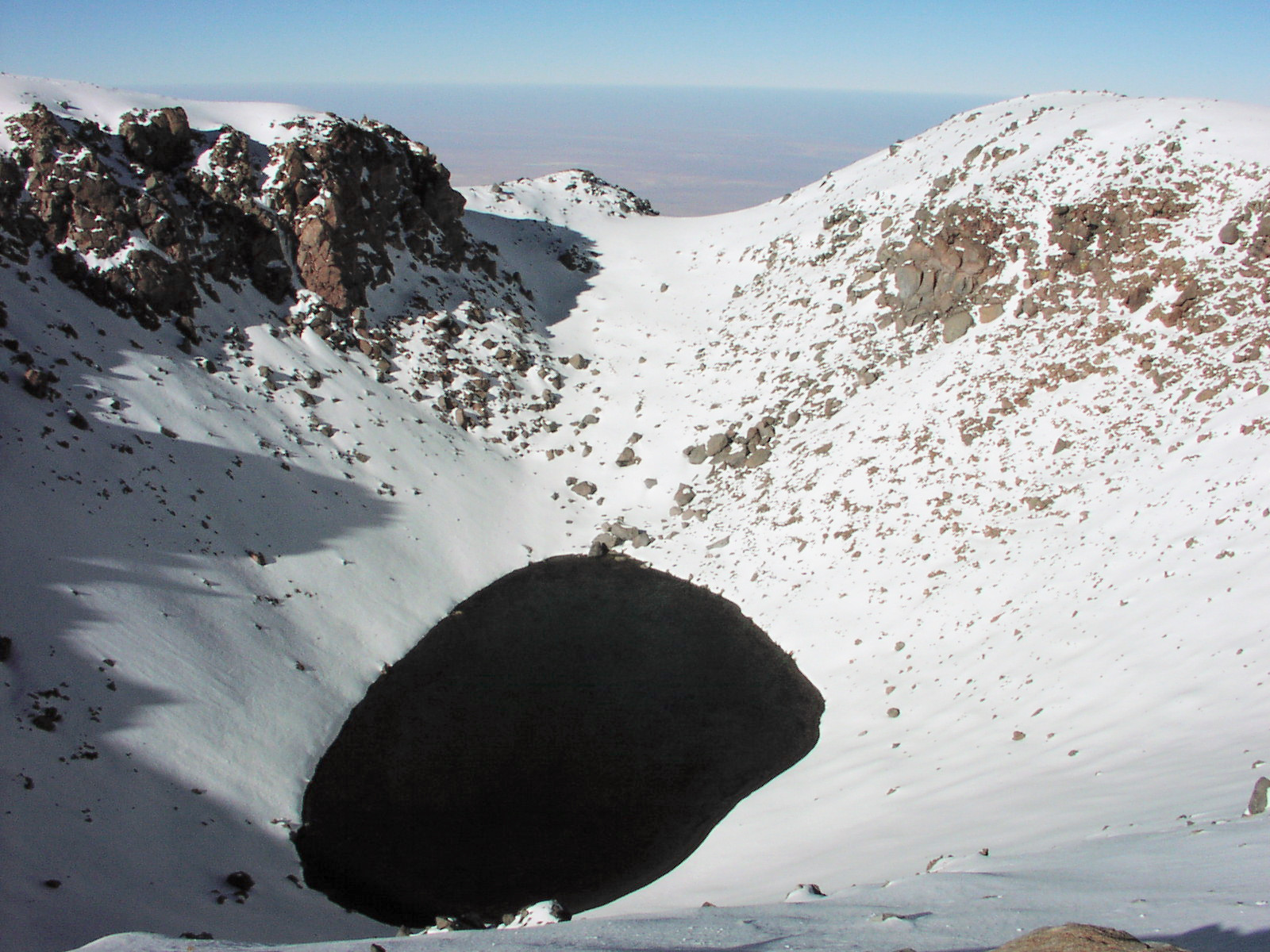
Lago Licancabur, site of the former world's highest ever altitude dive. It was superseded by a dive at Ojos de Salado in Chile.

Although no official records are recognized, until 2007 the highest recorded altitude at which a scuba dive had been conducted was 5,900 metres (19,400 ft), by a team led by Charles Brush and Johan Reinhard in 1982 in Lago Licancabur. This record was equaled by a team led by Nathalie Cabrol (SETI Institute/NASA Ames) in 2006. That year, Cabrol set the highest recorded altitude scuba diving for women.

In 2007, a new record was set in the small lagoon located near the summit of Pili Volcano, at just over 5,950 metres (19,520 ft), by Philippe Reuter, Claudia Henríquez and Alain Meyes. This record stood for nine years before it was surpassed in 2016. On 7 March 2016 Marcel Korkus discovered the highest lake on Earth (Cazadero at 5985 m above sea level) and thereby set the Guinness record in diving, confirmed by an official Guinness certificate. Shortly afterwards, as a result of the Guinness organization's change of regulations to being less restrictive, the record was awarded to a Hungarian diver and mountaineer Erno Tósoki dived a maximum of 2 meters (6.6 ft) deep, for about 10 minutes on altitude 6,382 meters (20,938 ft). His record breaking dive was supported by only one support team member.

The current record for the highest scuba dive was set on December 13, 2019 by Polish diver and mountaineer Marcel Korkus. He dived at an altitude of 6,395 m above sea level (20,981 ft), on Ojos del Salado volcano setting an absolute world record in altitude diving. He is the first person to dive at such a high altitude. The dive took place in the so-called basin (a natural water reservoir, which in terms of dimensions cannot be considered a lake). The ice was 1.3 meters thick and the water temperature was 3 °C. It is probable that a human cannot dive at any higher altitude. The highest scuba dive in the continental United States was done on 7 September 2013 by John Bali at Colorado's Pacific Tarn Lake, altitude 4,090 metres (13,420 ft). (Note: Prior to this the highest scuba dive in the continental US was a 1997 dive by Peter Hemming and David Moore at California's Tulainyo Lake, altitude 12,818 feet (3,907 m).)

The deepest known staged decompression altitude dive was conducted by Nuno Gomes at Boesmansgat (Bushman's hole) in South Africa. Conducted at an altitude of approximately 1,500 metres (4,900 ft), Gomes dived to a depth of 283 metres (928 ft). Gomes's decompression schedule was calculated as being equivalent to a dive to 339 metres (1,112 ft) if it had been conducted at sea level.

=== Jacques Cousteau's 1968 Lake Titicaca expedition ===
In 1968 Jacques Cousteau mounted an expedition to explore Bolivia and Peru's Lake Titicaca in search of submerged Inca treasure.

The diving equipment was tested and practice dives were made off the coast of Peru, but poor weather interrupted the practice session. The expedition departed from Matarani, Peru on the Pacific Ocean: two mini submarines were unloaded onto rail cars and transported up the Andes mountains to over 14,666 feet at Crucero Alto, then continued down the mountain by rail to Lake Titicaca at 3,812 metres (12,507 ft).

The team visited ruins in Peru before continuing south to Copacabana, Bolivia, where a parade was held in honor of the event. Ruins were visited at Isla del Sol and Isla de la Luna. Then dives were made in the area to minor underwater ruins. The expected rich schools of fish were not found. For the next four weeks, dives were made in the area, during which many dead fish were found and collected. Large toads were also found and collected. Samples of the dead fish and the toads were sent to the Oceanographic Museum in Monaco for study.

To help map the bottom of the lake Dr Harold Edgerton arrived from MIT with depth mapping equipment.

After mapping the lake an area was selected for the subs to dive. Floats were added to the subs to compensate for the lower density of fresh water, and the subs were launched. Jacques Cousteau and Albert Falco piloted the subs, which were accompanied by divers to a depth of 100 feet, then continued to a depth of 400 feet, where more toads were observed.

After the sub dive the results for the test on the dead fish arrived from Monaco. When trout were introduced into the lake in 1940 parasites were introduced with them.

== Training ==
The effects of altitude on decompression and corrections to the tables or decompression computer settings to compensate for altitude would generally be included in entry level commercial and scientific diver training, and may be included in recreational diver training at some level, or may be split out as an additional training program for those who intend to dive at altitude, by which method the diver is not required to deal with the small addition to decompression theory if they don't need it, but have to pay for an additional course if they do. For example PADI offer their Altitude Diver certification.
