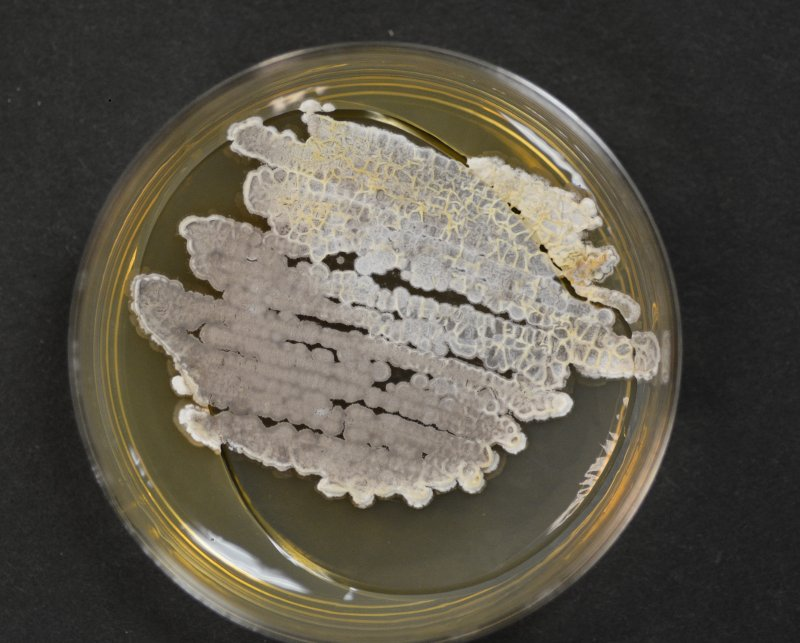

Scientific classification
- Domain: Bacteria
- Kingdom: Bacillati
- Phylum: Actinomycetota
- Class: Actinomycetes
- Order: Streptomycetales
- Family: Streptomycetaceae
- Genus: Streptomyces
- Species: S. leeuwenhoekii

Binomial name
- Streptomyces leeuwenhoekii Busarakam et al. 2014

Type strain
- C34, DSM 42122, NRRL B-24963

= Streptomyces leeuwenhoekii =

Species of bacterium

Streptomyces leeuwenhoekii is a bacterium species from the genus of Streptomyces which has been isolated from hyper-arid desert soil from Salar de Atacama in Chile. Streptomyces leeuwenhoekii produces chaxalactins and chaxamycins.

== See also ==
- List of Streptomyces species
