= Cordillera Domeyko =

Mountain range in Chile

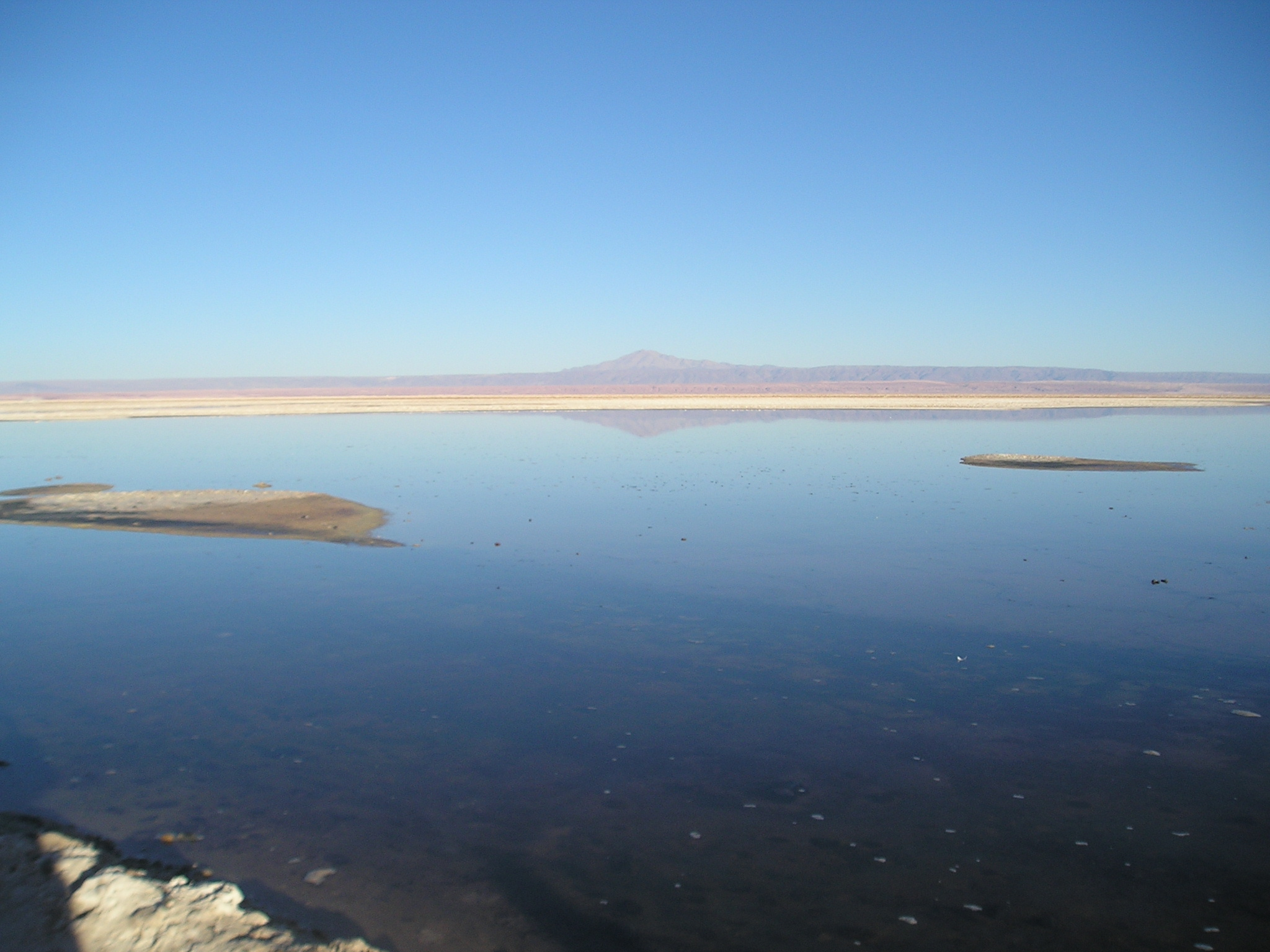
- Cerro Quimal in the distance

Highest point
- Peak: Cerro Quimal
- Elevation: 4,278 m (14,035 ft)
- Coordinates: 23°7′S 68°40′W

Dimensions
- Length: 600 km (370 mi) north-south

Geography
- Country: Chile
- Range coordinates: 24°30′S 69°00′W
- Parent range: Central Andes

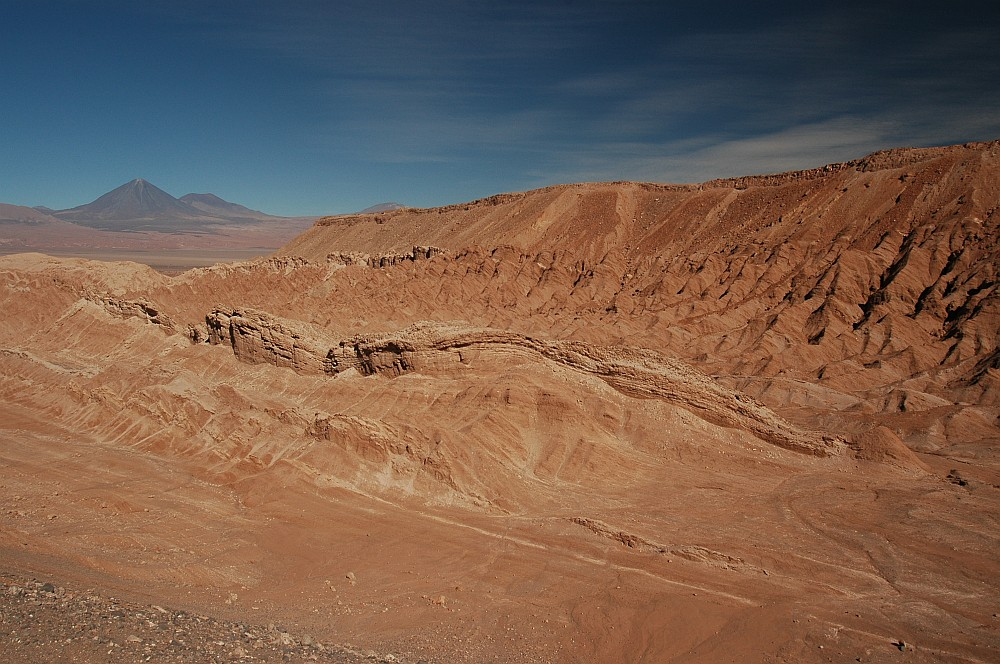
Cordillera de la Sal, part of Cordillera Domeyko. Licancabur and Juriques can be seen in the distance.

The Cordillera Domeyko is a mountain range of the Andes located in northern Chile, west of Salar de Atacama. It runs north-south for approximately 600 km, parallel to the main chain. The mountain range marks the eastern border of the flat parts of Atacama Desert. The western border of Cordillera Domeyko is characterized by inland cliffs and a sharp topographic transition known as El Bordo Escarpment. El Bordo Escarpment contain the main rock outcrops of the Purilactis Group, which make up much of the mountain range.

Cordillera Domeyko was named after Ignacy Domeyko and is the world's lowest humidity mountain range.
