= Chile Route 27 =

Highway in Chile

Route 27
- Ruta 27

Location
- Country: Chile

Highway system
- Highways in Chile

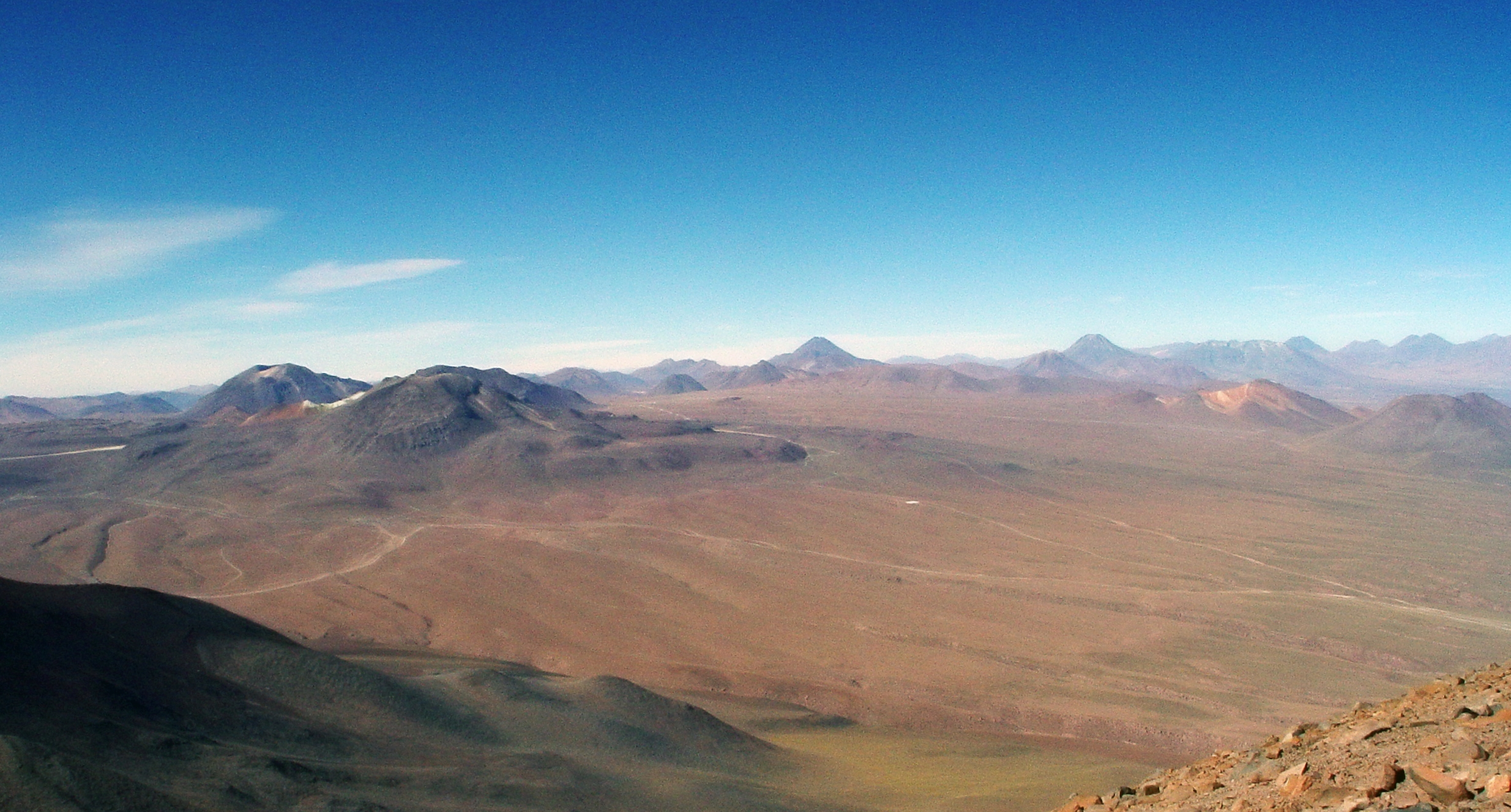
Chile Route 27 and other secondary roads as seen from Licancabur volcano.

Chile Route 27 (Ruta 27 CH) is a main road in the northern portion of Chile. It runs 156.19 km (97.05 mi) from San Pedro de Atacama to Paso de Jama. A short road off Route 27 heads north to Portezuelo del Cajón. Another adjacent road leads to Llano de Chajnantor Observatory, reaching maximum altitude of 5,064 metres (16,614 ft). The Chile Route 27 reaches an altitude according to OpenStreetMap of 4,831 metres (15,850 ft) at 23°04′21″S 67°30′17″W at a road distance of 57.6 kilometres (35.8 mi) west of the border, making it one of the highest highways in South America.

The sections Salar de Pujsa and Salar de Tara-Salar de Aguas Calientes of Los Flamencos National Reserve can be accessed by this road.
