= Purilactis Group =

- Stratigraphic range: Upper Cretaceous–Upper Eocene
- Type: Geological group
- Unit of: Salar de Atacama basin
- Thickness: >6,000 m (20,000 ft)

Lithology
- Primary: Conglomerate, basaltic andesite lava, rhyolitic ignimbrite
- Other: Gypsum

Location
- Coordinates: 22°45′56″S 68°27′47″W
- Region: Antofagasta Region
- Country: Chile
- Purilactis Group (Chile)

Purilactis Group (Spanish: Grupo Purilactis) is a heterogeneous group of volcanic, volcano-sedimentary and formations of Cretaceous to Eocene age in Salar de Atacama basin, northern Chile. The group has a stratigraphic thickness of more than 6000 m. The group overlies basement rocks of Late Paleozoic age. The north-south El Bordo Escarpment of Cordillera Domeyko contain the main outcrops of the group. The group has been difficult to date in detail since it hosts few fossils and dateable minerals. The sediments of the group deposited when volcanism in the area was mainly occurring to the west of it, rather than to east as in the present-day. In geological terms this qualifies the basin as a back-arc basin.

From top to bottom, the main units (formations) of the group outlined by Mpodozis and co-worders in 1999 are:

- Cerro Puntiagudo Strata
- Loma Amarilla Strata
- "Orange" Unit
- Cerro Totola Strata
- Barros Arana Strata
- Purilactis Formation
  - Río Grande Member
  - Serilao Member
  - Vizcachita Member
  - Licán Member
  - Limón Verde Member
- Tonel Formation

Tonel Formation is separated from Purilactis Formation by a fault, while the remaining first-order units are separated from each other by disconformities. The Tonel Formation exhibit at some localities diapirism in its gypsum layers. Tectonic movements have tilted the northern part of Purilactis Group into a near-vertical position with the stratigraphically higher parts being located in the east. Other tectonic movements have thrust the older Paleozoic basement over the top of the southern part of the Purilactis Group. These movements account to a phase of tectonic inversion belonging to the "Incaic Phase" of the Andean orogeny.
