= Chaxas (volcano) =

Lava dome complex in the Andes

Coordinates: 22°45′S 68°00′W

Chaxas is a lava dome complex which has been the source of the 1.09±0.56 mya Chaxas ignimbrite in the Andes. The ignimbrite dips away from the domes and are partially younger than the Puripicar ignimbrite.

The dome has a diameter of 5 kilometres (3.1 mi) and fills the vent area of the ignimbrite. Licancabur volcano is constructed on top of this ignimbrite. Some Inka ceramics are derived from the clay in this ignimbrite.
