= Cerro Toco =

Mountain in Chile

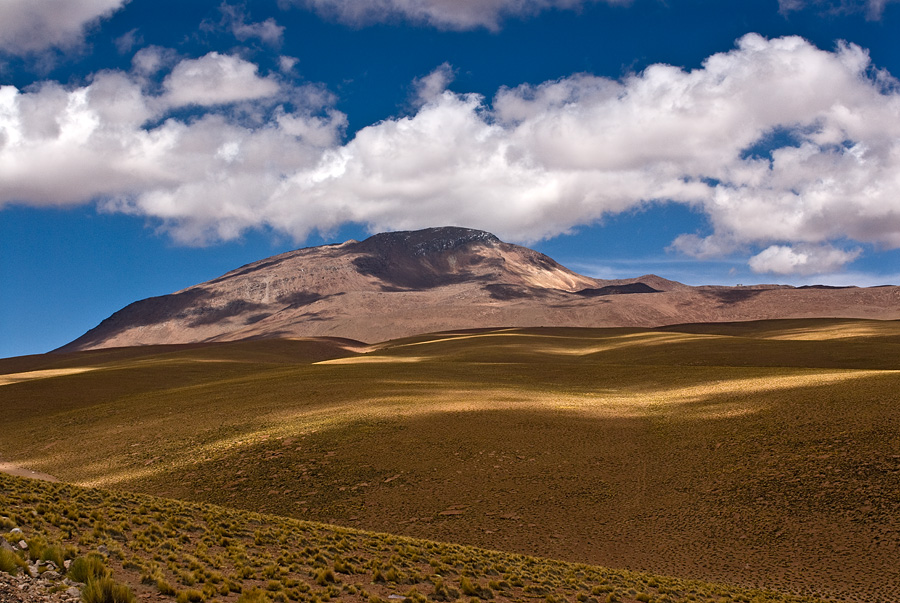
- Cerro Toco lies at the NE end of the Purico complex. Camera location: 22° 55.411'S 7° 50.699'W Heading: 112° Alt.: 4,351 m (14,275 ft)

Highest point
- Elevation: 5,604 m (18,386 ft)
- Coordinates: 22°56.396′S 67°46.816′W

Geography
- Location: Chile
- Parent range: Andes

Geology
- Mountain type: Stratovolcano

Cerro Toco is a stratovolcano located in the eastern part of the Atacama Desert in Chile's II Region (Antofagasta), approximately 6 km (4 mi) south of the border between Bolivia and Chile and 12 km (7 mi) SE of the Juriques and Licancabur volcanoes. It conforms the north eastern extreme of the Purico Complex, a pyroclastic shield made up by several stratovolcanoes, lava domes and a maar.

Cerro Toco is located in the Chajnantor Scientific Reserve, as is most of the Purico Complex. The Atacama Cosmology Telescope and the Huan Tran Telescope are located on the western side of the mountain at approximately 5,200 m (17,100 ft).

== See also ==
- List of volcanoes in Chile
- Purico Complex
- Licancabur
- Juriques
- Laguna Verde (Bolivia)
- Andes

View from the top of Cerro Toco toward northwest. Volcanoes Licancabur (between the sticks) and Juriques are visible, as well as Laguna Blanca in Bolivia.

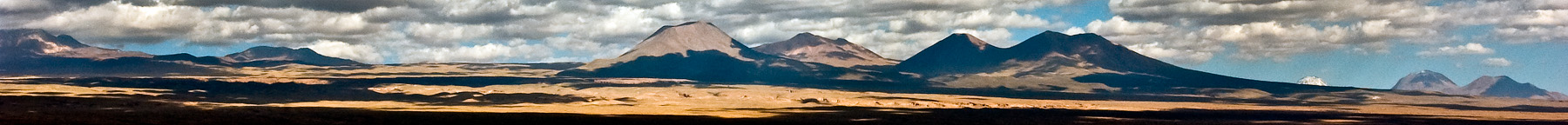
The Purico complex seen from the NNW. From left to right: Cerro Toco, Cerro Purico, Cerro Negro, (mountain - unknown to me), Cerros de Macón. In the background you can see the Colachi (snow-covered), Laguna Verde and Acamarachi strato-volcanoes. Camera location: 22° 55.160'S 68° 6.831'W Heading: 116° Alt.: 2,501 m (8,205 ft)
