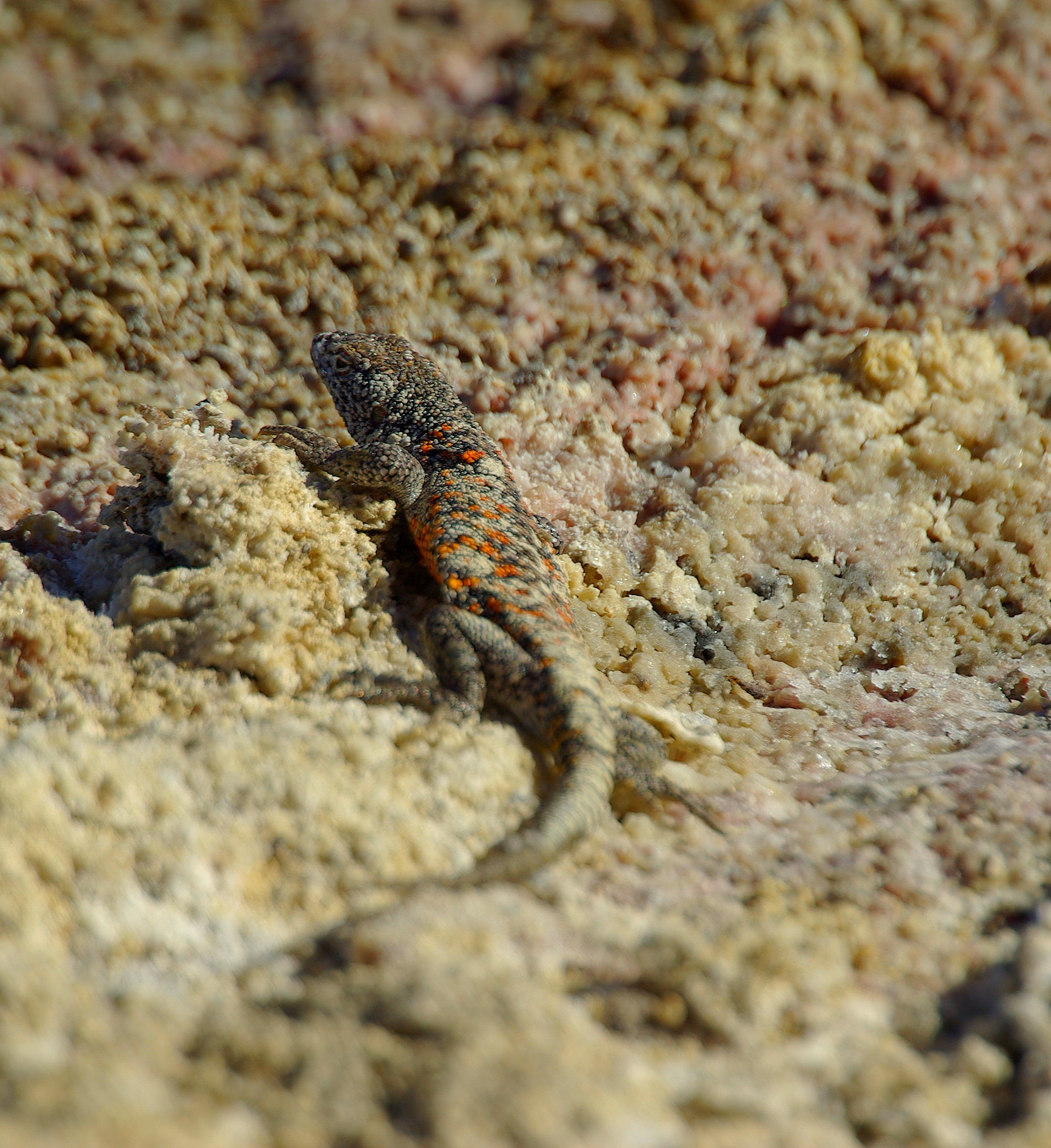
- Liolaemus fabiani in the Salar de Atacama

Conservation status
- Endangered (IUCN 3.1)

Scientific classification
- Kingdom: Animalia
- Phylum: Chordata
- Class: Reptilia
- Order: Squamata
- Suborder: Iguania
- Family: Liolaemidae
- Genus: Liolaemus
- Species: L. fabiani

Binomial name
- Liolaemus fabiani Yáñez & Núñez, 1983

Synonyms
- Liolaemus fabiani Yáñez & Núñez, 1983; Abas fabiani — Núñez & Yáñez, 1984; Liolaemus fabiani — Valladares et al., 2002; Liolaemus (Eulaemus) fabiani — Ramírez-Leyton & Pincheira-Donoso, 2005

= Liolaemus fabiani =

Species of lizard

Liolaemus fabiani, commonly known as Fabian's lizard, Yanez's tree iguana, and lagartija de Fabián in Spanish, is a species of lizard in the family Liolaemidae. It is native to Chile.

== Etymology ==
The specific name, fabiani, is in honor of Chilean ecologist Fabián Jaksic.

== Geographic range ==
L. fabiani is endemic to the Salar de Atacama, the Atacama salt flat, in northern Chile.

The species was first described by José L. Yáñez and Herman Núñez in 1983, from a sample collected at a high elevation, 2,450 m (8,040 ft), near San Pedro de Atacama in Llano de Vilama in September 1981 by the Chilean National Museum of Natural History.

== Habitat ==
The preferred natural habitat of L. fabiani is hot desert, at altitudes of 2,300–3,000 m (7,500–9,800 ft), where it is found near water, and has been observed swimming in search of prey.

== Description ==
Principle diagnostic features of L. fabiani are: "subtriangular head with temporal and occipital regions more prominent than in other species of the genus; dorsal humeral scales smooth and triangular; color pattern ornamented with red and black spots."

== Diet ==
L. fabiani preys upon mosquitoes and other insects.

== Reproduction ==
L. fabiani is viviparous.
