= Licancabur Lake =

Crater lake in Chile

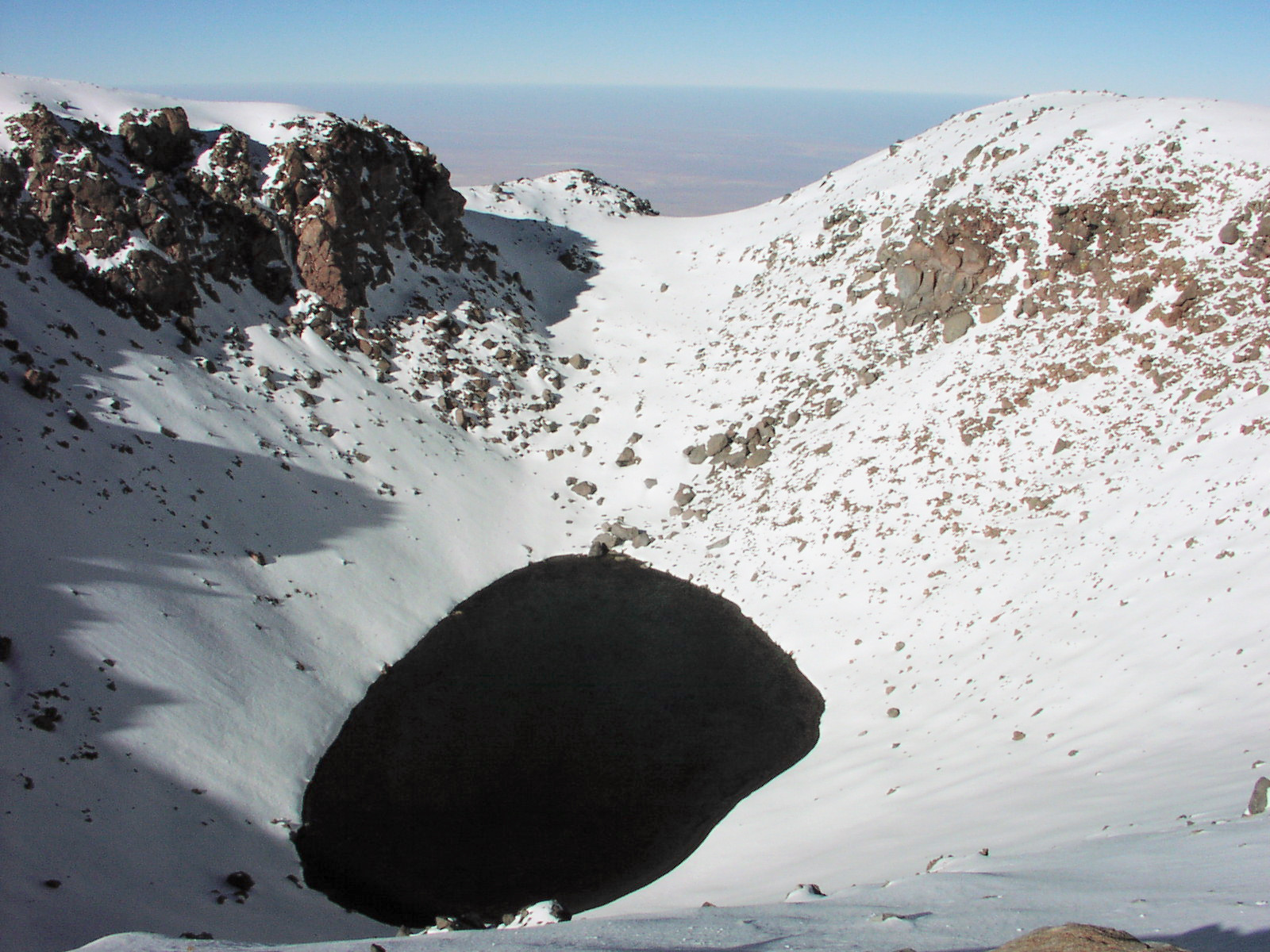

- Location within Chile
- Location: Licancabur volcano
- Coordinates: 22°50′2″S 67°53′1″W
- Lake type: Volcanic crater lake
- Primary outflows: Seepage and evaporation
- Catchment area: 22,000 square metres (240,000 ft^{2})
- Basin countries: Chile
- Max. width: 85 metres (280 ft)
- Surface area: 0.007 km^{2} (0.0027 sq mi)
- Average depth: 5.2 m (17 ft)
- Max. depth: 5–6 m (16–20 ft) approx.
- Surface elevation: 5,900 m (19,400 ft)
- Frozen: most of the year

Licancabur Lake is a crater lake in Chile located on the volcano Licancabur (Región de Antofagasta, Province of El Loa). It is close to the city San Pedro de Atacama and also very close to the border of Chile with Bolivia.

The lake is among several high altitude volcanic lakes in the region. Licancabur Lake is located inside the summit crater of Licancabur and was discovered by climbers in 1953, when it was 85 metres (280 ft) long. While the waterbody may have overflowed in the past, presently it is only drained by seepage and evaporation. Lake levels are variable; in 2002 it covered a surface area of 7,000 square metres (75,000 sq ft).

The lake's waters are clear and slightly saline. Temperature readings recorded at the lake bottom in 2006 suggest it is subject to geothermal heating. The local climate is arid, cold and subject to strong insolation, including strong ultraviolet radiation. This has caused the lake to be compared to the environment of Mars. Despite these conditions, bacteria, archaea, crustaceans and even a midge live in the lake.

== Context ==
Volcanic lakes in the Andes of Bolivia and Chile can be found at high altitude, some close to or exceeding 6,000 metres (20,000 ft). Such lakes often are poor in nutrients and exposed to strong ultraviolet radiation, partly due to high insolation and partly because their waters tend to be transparent to ultraviolet radiation. Further, the atmosphere at such altitudes is oxygen-poor. These and other environmental properties are similar to the conditions that had existed on Mars. At the end of the last ice age, the Andes became much drier. The NASA High Lakes Project has studied several such lakes, including scuba dives in Licancabur Lake during 2006. The lake has been used as a testing ground.

Licancabur Lake is located on Licancabur, a volcano whose cone dominates the Bolivian-Chilean frontier and the surrounding region. This volcano formed in the late Pleistocene, and is potentially active. Two other lakes, Laguna Blanca and Laguna Verde, can be found at the foot of the volcano. Licancabur was considered a holy mountain by the Atacameno people and climbing it is discouraged. Nevertheless, stone buildings were found by climbers on the crater rim in 1953. Contemporary legend has it that a golden guanaco head can be found in the crater.

== Physical properties ==
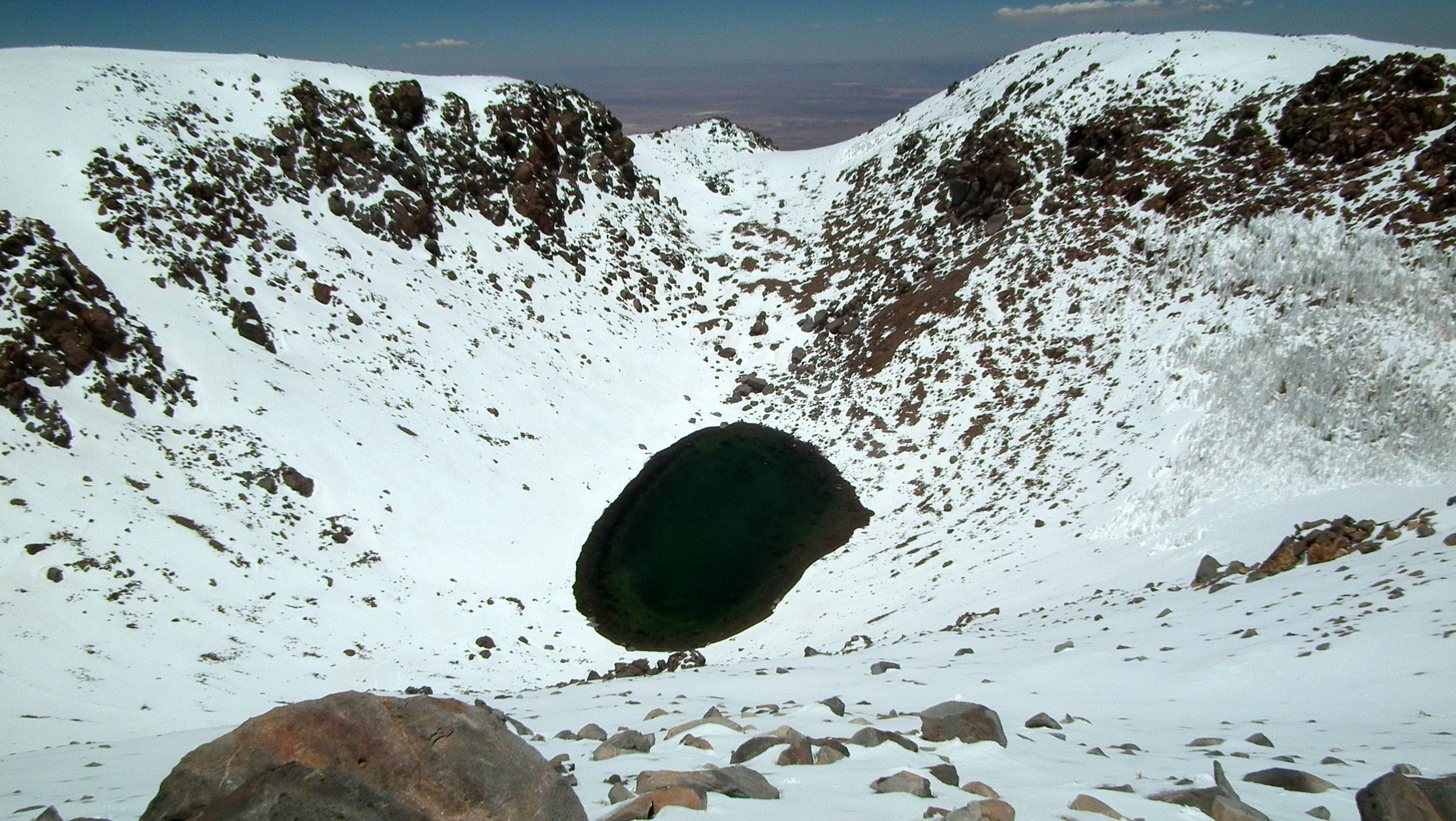
Licancabur Lake in 2012, viewed from the rim

The lake was first discovered by climbers in 1953. The lake is at the bottom of the crater of Licancabur, at a depth of 46 metres (150 ft) beneath the crater rim. Little dissolved material renders its waters clear. It is one of the highest lakes in the world and one of the highest volcanic lakes; another Andean volcanic lake, Ojos del Salado, is even higher but is poorly known.

The lake has the shape of an ellipse, 85 metres (280 ft) long at discovery. In 2002, the lake covered a surface area of 7,000 square metres (75,000 sq ft). The lake is maximally 5.2 metres (17 ft) deep, although it varied considerably between 1990–2010. It lies at an altitude of 5,900 metres (19,300 ft). Its catchment covers a surface area of 22,000 square metres (240,000 ft^{2}) and was probably larger before the crater began to erode. The shore is formed by sand, scree and talus.

Snowmelt provides the water for the lake, with the average precipitation measured at 118 millimetres (4.6 in) between 2002–2007. According to estimates in 1955, slightly more than half of the lake water leaves the lake through seepage and the rest through evaporation. It is possible in the past that the lake overflowed its southwestern rim through a channel there, when the climate was wetter and water depth reached 40 metres (130 ft). This would explain the lack of salt deposits. There are also past shorelines indicating past depths of 10–12 metres (33–39 ft).

Water temperatures range from 1.4 to 4.3 °C (34.5 to 39.7 °F). Water temperatures are highest at the shore and decrease towards the centre of the lake. The lake is sometimes covered with ice, contrasting with other crater lakes in the region which were usually frozen. Currently, an ice cover exists from April to September; it can reach a thickness of 80 centimetres (31 in). Furthermore, night frosts can generate a thin ice cover that thaws in the morning. The water is clear and the bottom visible.

Overall salt content is 1.2 grams per litre (4.3×10^{−5} lb/cu in). The original discoverers of Licancabur Lake considered it to have a low salt content, given that typical salt deposits were missing. The high quantities of aluminum, calcium, iron, magnesium and sodium in the waters of the lake compared to the quantities in springs at the foot of Licancabur may be due to prolonged water-rock interactions. Nitrite, nitrate and phosphate concentrations are small. Chloride and sulfate indicate the input of geothermal liquids into the lake, and degassing was observed in 2006, linked with higher water temperatures in the area of the degassing in the northeastern part of the lake. During 2002–2006, pH values of 8-4-6.9 were measured.

=== Environmental conditions ===
Licancabur Lake is exposed to extreme climatic conditions, including low air pressure, strong insolation and strong temperature fluctuations. The entire region has been arid for the entire Holocene and strong evaporation is prevalent. Shorelines around numerous lakes indicate that in the past, water levels were higher.

Air temperatures at Licancabur Lake range from 5 to −25 °C (41 to −13 °F) during the daytime and −25 to −45 °C (−13 to −49 °F) at night. The air pressure is less than half that at sea level. Water temperatures at the lake bottom are almost always below 0 °C (32 °F) although one measurement in 1984 indicated a temperature of 6 °C (43 °F). Such warming may be caused by geothermal heat from the volcano.

Most precipitation falls during the so-called "Altiplanic winter" in summer, but winter storms also bring some water to the Licancabur region. The region experiences a high insolation with ultraviolet radiation, which can damage the DNA of organisms. Occasionally, the Antarctic ozone hole influences the Licancabur area. The environment at Licancabur Lake, with low temperatures, precipitation and atmospheric pressure and high UV radiation, has been compared to that of ancient lakes on Mars, raising interest in its lifeforms. In 2002, a weather station was placed on the shores of the lake to record weather and ultraviolet radiation data.

== Biology ==
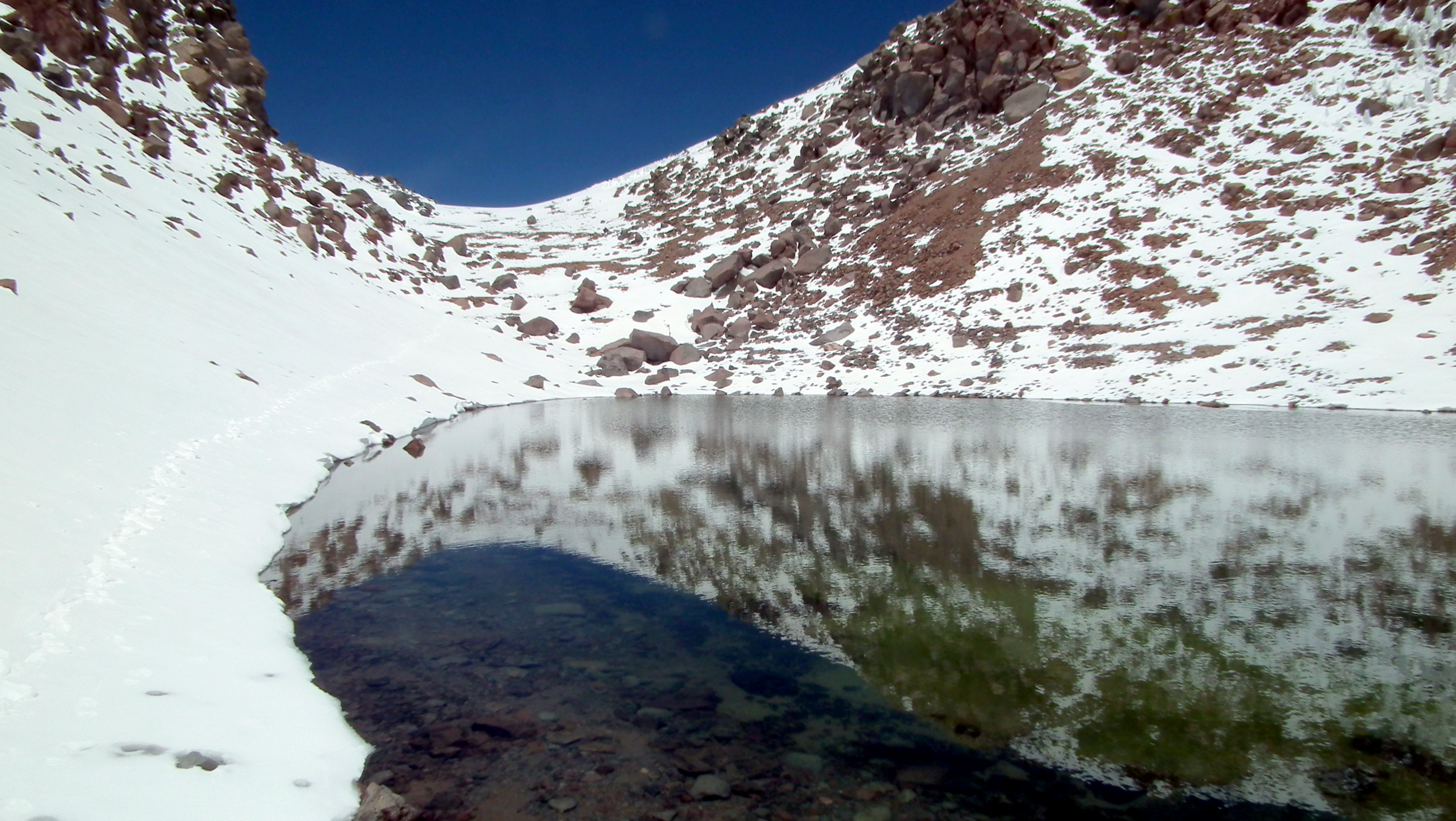
Lake in 2012, viewed from the lake shore

In 1981, archeologists discovered that Licancabur Lake hosts plankton. Despite the high ultraviolet radiation, organisms can be found in the radiation-exposed parts of the water column, including at the lake surface at noon.

Owing to the extreme environmental conditions, the biodiversity of high-altitude lakes like Licancabur Lake has been studied. A total dissolved carbon content of 2.44 milligrams per litre (8.8×10^{−8} lb/cu in) has been found in the lake. The amount of cells found in sediments of the lake increases with the depth of the sediments; archea are only present beneath 2.5 metres (8 ft 2 in). Microbial mats containing cyanobacteria have been found on the lake bottom.

Typical bacterial taxa are Actinomycetota, Bacteroidota, and Betaproteobacteria. Overall, at such high lakes only a limited amount of bacterial taxa can be found. The Pseudomonadota and Bacteroidota dominate the community of Licancabur Lake bacteria, something that has also been found in other lakes in similar environments in Tibet and northwest Argentina. There are more bacterial species in the lake than archean ones. Cyanobacteria are mostly taxa which display nitrogen fixing such as Calothrix, Nodularia and Nostoc. Other organisms are involved in sulfur metabolism. There are noticeable differences in the bacterial communities in shallow and deep waters.

Cyanobacterial genomic sequences resemble these of geothermal and cold environments. Most genomic sequences isolated in Licancabur lake have less than 95% similarity to cultured species, with about 37% of all cyanobacteria observed being new species.

Coloured copepods were observed to form swarms in the lake; some in November 2006 were found at the lake surface and others hidden between rocks. Two cladoceran, two ostracod and one testate amoeba species were originally discovered in Licancabur Lake. The zooplankton species identified at Licancabur are widespread in South America, in one case reaching Antarctica.

Animal species that have been identified in Licancabur Lake include the cladoceran crustacean Alona altiplana, the calanoid copepod Boeckella titicacae, alternatively identified as Boeckella gracilipes, the cladoceran Daphniopsis chilensis which may be endemic to the lake, the cladoceran crustacean Pleuroxus fryeri, and the testate amoeba Scutiglypha cabrolae. One species each of a testate amoeba, a chironomid, a rotifer, two species of copepods, and three species of cladocerans were reported in 2009. The larva of the chironomid midge is also the highest find of a chironomid midge, surpassing Tibetan specimens.

== Notes ==
=== Sources ===
- Cabrol, Nathalie A.; Grin, Edmond A. (15 September 2010). Lakes on Mars. Elsevier. ISBN 978-0-08-093162-3.
- Cabrol, Nathalie A.; Grin, Edmond A.; Chong, Guillermo; Minkley, Edwin; Hock, Andrew N.; Yu, Youngseob; Bebout, Leslie; Fleming, Erich; Häder, Donat P.; Demergasso, Cecilia; Gibson, John; Escudero, Lorena; Dorador, Cristina; Lim, Darlene; Woosley, Clayton; Morris, Robert L.; Tambley, Cristian; Gaete, Victor; Galvez, Matthieu E.; Smith, Eric; Uskin-Peate, Ingrid; Salazar, Carlos; Dawidowicz, G.; Majerowicz, J. (June 2009). "The High-Lakes Project". Journal of Geophysical Research: Biogeosciences. 114 (G2) 2008JG000818: n/a. Bibcode:2009JGRG..114.0D06C. doi:10.1029/2008JG000818.
- Cabrol, Nathalie A.; Grin, Edmond A.; Hock, Andrew N. (13 September 2007). "Mitigation of environmental extremes as a possible indicator of extended habitat sustainability for lakes on early Mars". In Hoover, Richard B.; Levin, Gilbert V.; Rozanov, Alexei Y.; Davies, Paul C. W. (eds.). Instruments, Methods, and Missions for Astrobiology X. Vol. 6694. pp. 335–346. Bibcode:2007SPIE.6694E..10C. doi:10.1117/12.731506.
- Demergasso, Cecilia; Dorador, Cristina; Meneses, Daniela; Blamey, Jenny; Cabrol, Nathalie; Escudero, Lorena; Chong, Guillermo (June 2010). "Prokaryotic diversity pattern in high-altitude ecosystems of the Chilean Altiplano". Journal of Geophysical Research: Biogeosciences. 115 (G2) 2008JG000836. Bibcode:2010JGRG..115.0D09D. doi:10.1029/2008jg000836.
- Escudero, Lorena; Chong, Guillermo; Demergasso, Cecilia; Farías, María Eugenia; Cabrol, Nathalie A.; Grin, Edmond; Minkley, Edwin Jr.; Yu, Yeoungeob (2007-09-13). Hoover, Richard B; Levin, Gilbert V; Rozanov, Alexei Y; Davies, Paul C. W (eds.). "Investigating microbial diversity and UV radiation impact at the high-altitude Lake Aguas Calientes, Chile". Instruments, Methods, and Missions for Astrobiology X. 1: 66940Z. Bibcode:2007SPIE.6694E..0ZE. doi:10.1117/12.736970. hdl:11336/92123. S2CID 123492194.
- Morris, R.; Berthold, R.; Cabrol, N. (2007). Diving at extreme altitude: dive planning and execution during the 2006 High Lakes Science Expedition. American Academy of Underwater Sciences 26th Symposium. Dauphin Island, Alabama: American Academy of Underwater Sciences. pp. 155–167 – via Academia.edu.
- Rudolph, William E. (1955-01-01). "Licancabur: Mountain of the Atacameños". Geographical Review. 45 (2): 151–171. Bibcode:1955GeoRv..45..151R. doi:10.2307/212227. JSTOR 212227.
- SMET, Willem H. DE (2009-04-30). "On a New Species of Euglyphid Testate Amoeba, Scutiglypha cabrolae, from the Licancabur Caldera Lake, Central Andes" (PDF). Acta Protozoologica. 48 (2). ISSN 1689-0027. Archived from the original (PDF) on 28 March 2017.
