= Liolaemus audituvelatus =

Conservation status
- Vulnerable (IUCN 3.1)

Scientific classification
- Kingdom: Animalia
- Phylum: Chordata
- Class: Reptilia
- Order: Squamata
- Suborder: Iguania
- Family: Liolaemidae
- Genus: Liolaemus
- Species: L. audituvelatus

Binomial name
- Liolaemus audituvelatus (Núñez & Yáñez, 1983)

Synonyms
- Ctenoblepharys audituvelatus Núñez & Yáñez, 1983; Phrynosaura audituvelata (Núñez & Yáñez, 1983); Phrynosaura manueli Núñez et al., 2003; Liolaemus manueli (Núñez et al., 2003)

Species of lizard

Liolaemus audituvelatus is a species of lizard in the family Liolaemidae. The species is endemic to Chile.
