= Salar de Atacama =

Salt flat in Chile

Coordinates: 23°30′S 68°15′W

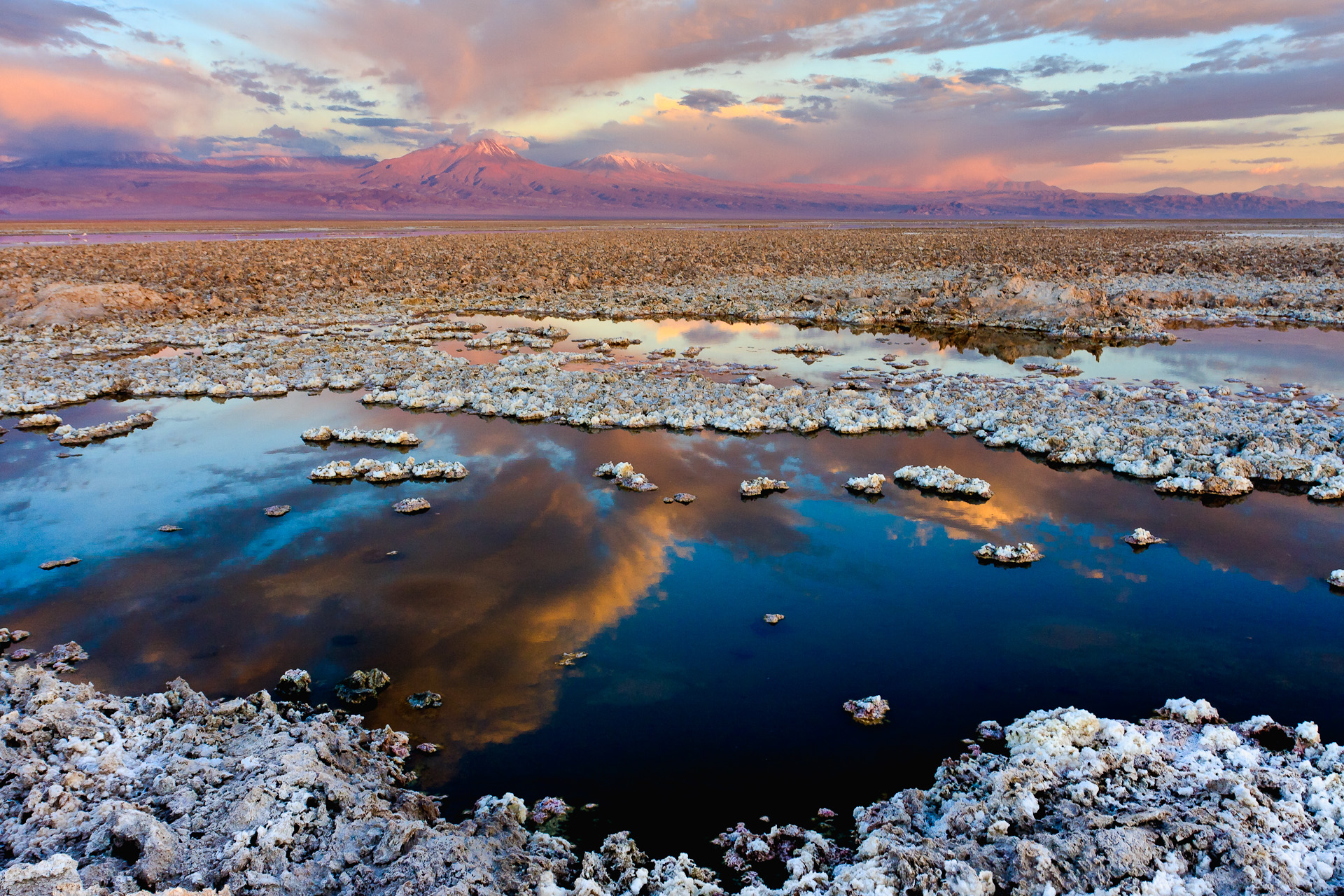
Salar de Atacama with the Licancabur Volcano in the background.

Salar de Atacama, located 55 km (34 mi) south of San Pedro de Atacama, is the largest salt flat in Chile. It is surrounded by mountains and lacks drainage outlets. To the east, it is enclosed by the main chain of the Andes, while to the west lies a secondary mountain range called Cordillera de Domeyko. The landscape is dominated by imposing volcanoes such as Licancabur, Acamarachi, Aguas Calientes, and Láscar, the latter being one of Chile's most active volcanoes. These volcanoes are situated along the eastern side of the Salar de Atacama, forming a north–south trending line that separates it from smaller endorheic basins.

Systematic economic surveys of the mineral resources of the salt flat begun in the 1960s with Chilean and American investigations financed through a grant from the United Nations. Anaconda Company discovered the lithium in the brines in 1962 while searching for freshwater for its copper mining operations. Since the 2000s, Salar de Atacama has become a significant hub for lithium extraction, as lithium is found in the brines of the salt flat.

The Likan Antay people are the indigenous inhabitants of Salar de Atacama and its surrounding areas.

== Geographical overview ==
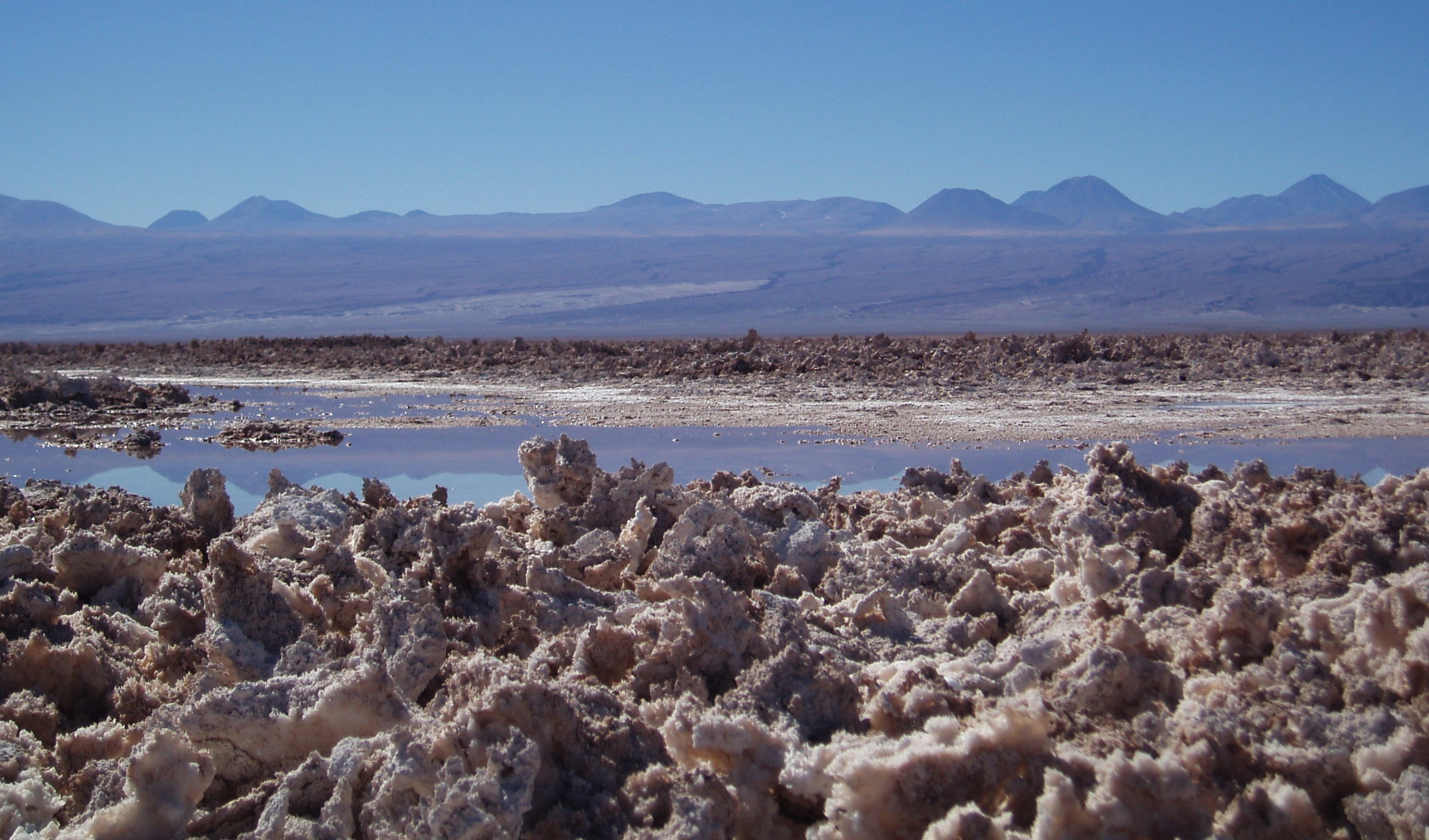
Atacama's rugged landscape.

The salt flat encompasses 3,000 km^{2} (1,200 mi^{2}), is about 100 km (62 mi) long and 80 km (50 mi) wide, which makes it the third largest in the world, after Salar de Uyuni in Bolivia (10,582 km^{2} (4,086 mi^{2})). and Salinas Grandes in Argentina (6,000 km^{2} (2,300 mi^{2})). Its average elevation is about 2,300 m ( about 7,546 feet ) above sea level. The topography of the core portion of the salar exhibits a high level of roughness, the result of evaporation and ephemeral surface water, unlike the most other salt flats, as for example the Salar de Uyuni, which is periodically covered with shallow water.

Some areas of the salt flat form part of Los Flamencos National Reserve. The Laguna Cejar is a sink hole lake in the Salar de Atacama, 18 km from San Pedro, Chile. It has a salt concentration that ranges from 5 to 28% (50 to 280 parts per thousand), producing at the higher end of the range an effect of floating like the Dead Sea.

== Geology ==
Salar de Atacama is part of a larger depression hosting other salt flats. This depression, called "La gran fosa" by Reinaldo Börgel is bounded by north–south structures. At present this larger depression conforms a subsiding sedimentary basin. Comparing with neighboring areas of the Andes the depression is a major topographical anomaly thought to be caused by a lithospheric block that due to its high density has remained at a lower position than the rest of the Andes. The high density would derive from the times the Salar de Atacama depression was a westward rift arm of the Salta Rift Basin located further east in Argentine territory.

South of Salar de Atacama ancient plutonic rocks of Cambrian and Ordovician age crop out. These rocks are associated with the Famatinian orogeny.

From the Late Cretaceous to the Late Eocene volcanic and sedimentary rocks of the Purilactis Group deposited in the basin. During this time volcanism occurred chiefly west of the basin rather than east as in the present, thus it was back then a back-arc basin. After the Purilactis Group had deposited tectonic movements tilted the strata in the north to east and in the south a thrust fault pushed old Late Paleozoic rocks over the younger Purilactis Group.

== Hydrology ==
Salar de Atacama basin is bordered on the north by the Salado River basin, which is a sub-basin of the Loa River basin. To the east, the drainage divide approximately coincides with the international border with Bolivia until the Portezuelo del Cajón. The dividing range includes the volcanoes Cerros de Tocorpuri, Sairecabur, Curiquinca, Licancabur and Juriques. Going southward, the water divide runs along a chain of volcanoes that lie entirely in Chilean territory. To the west, the Cordillera Domeyko separates the Salar de Atacama basin from arheic areas.

Its main tributaries are the San Pedro and Vilama rivers, which originate to the north of the salt flat.

=== Lithium-rich brines ===
Lithium concentrations in the brines of the Salar de Atacama vary with geographical position and depth. The brines distanced from the northern and eastern rims of the salt flat —that is the "core" (Spanish: núcleo del salar)— have the highest lithium concentration of any salt flat in the Lithium Triangle. The cause for the high concentration of lithium in the brines of Salar de Atacama is not fully clear as various competing hypothesis exists. It is suggested that high geothermal gradients and altitude differences in the hydrological basin enhances the leaching of lithium from rocks and clays. The volcanoes east of Salar de Atacama may have a role in contaminating the incoming streams with salts. Some litium-rich waters entering Salar de Atacama are thought to have been previously concentrated at salt lakes at higher elevation. An important factor for the further concentration and preservation of lithium in the brines of the salt flat is the high evapotranspiration in the area which is related to the extreme aridity and the high solar radiation in the area.

In terms of isotopic composition the brines of Salar de Atacama are rich in lithium-7 relative to lithium-6 which is thought to be the result of the precipitation of lithium minerals which fractionate the lighter isotopes.

== Lithium production ==
Located in the Lithium Triangle, Salar de Atacama is the world's largest and purest active source of lithium, and contained as of 2008 27% of the world's lithium reserve base, and as of 2017 provided about 36% of the world's lithium carbonate supply, followed by China with 23%. High lithium concentration in its brine (2,700 parts per million), a high rate of evaporation (3,500 mm per year), and extremely low annual rainfall (<30 mm average per year) make Atacama's finished lithium carbonate easier and cheaper to produce than from the neighboring Salar de Uyuni, which is estimated to have half of the lithium reserves in the world. Salar de Atacama's evaporation rate is the highest in the lithium industry, followed by Puna de Atacama, Argentina (2,600 mm per year), and the Salar de Uyuni (1,300–1,700 mm per year). For comparison are lithium concentrations of 200 parts per million of economic interest elsewhere. The solar energy consumed in the evaporation ponds represents a zero-cost input.

Extraction of lithium-rich brines is credited for ushering a conflict about water use with local communities and is damaging the local ecosystem, including the Andean flamingo. The local indigenous population of Likan Antay have a history of both opposing lithium extraction and negotiating for shared benefits with lithium companies. Negotiations occur under the framework of the Indigenous and Tribal Peoples Convention which Chile signed in 2008. It is argued that "[a]greements between Indigenous organizations and lithium companies have brought significant economic resources for community development, but have also expanded the mining industry's capacity for social control in the area.".

In the Salar de Atacama, boron is also extracted from brines as boric acid (up to 0.85 g/L as B). The natural removal of boron and lithium from present-day brines possibly occurs as ulexite and lithium-sulfate, this latter as double and/or triple salts.

Sociedad Química y Minera (SQM) and Albemarle operating in Salar de Atacama are among the largest lithium producers in the World. The lithium extraction process in Salar de Atacama begins with salty brine being pumped out of the ground and then put to rest in evaporation ponds so the remaining brine is slowly enriched in lithium. The evaporation pond stage takes usually 12 to 18 months which is the time it takes for it to reach a lithium concentration of 6%. The final processing is done in Planta Salar del Carmen and Planta La Negra near the city of Antofagasta on the coast where pure lithium carbonate, lithium hydroxide, and lithium chloride are produced from the brine.

In December 2025 the lithium mining activities of SQM in Salar de Actacama were subsumed into the company Nova Andino Litio which is a joint venture of state-owned Codelco and SQM.

== Gallery ==
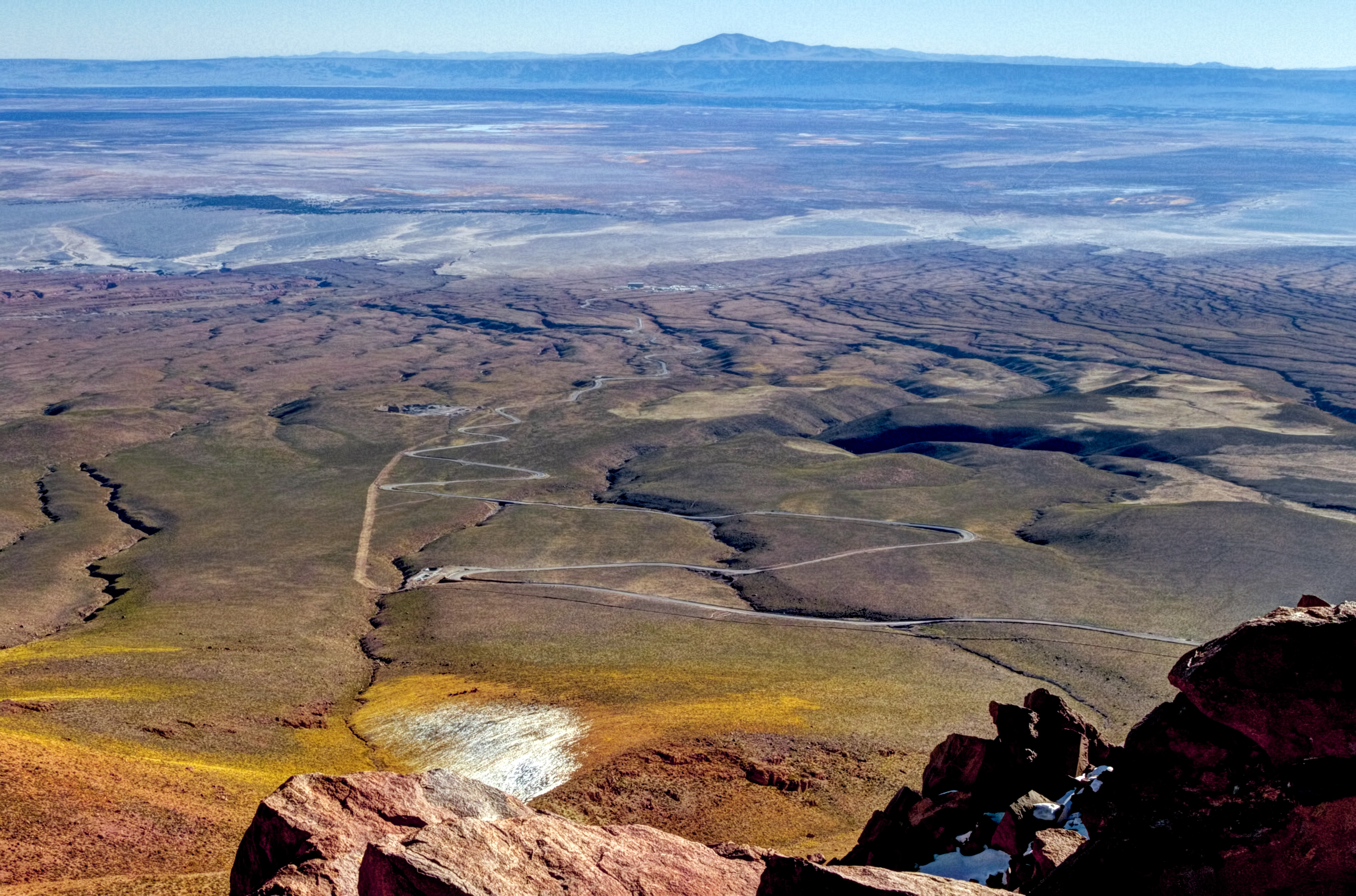
Photograph was taken from 4660 meters above sea level

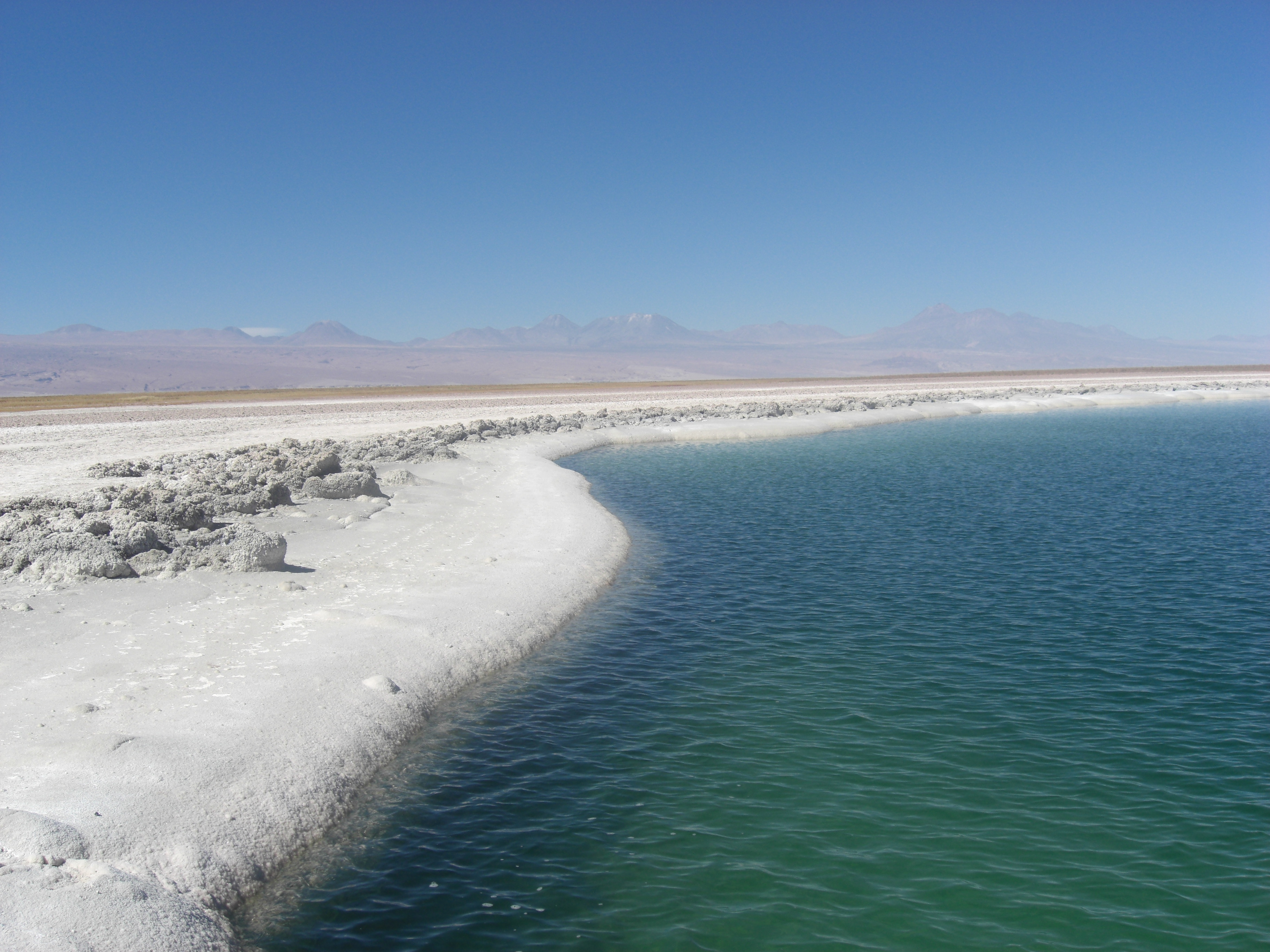
Laguna Cejar

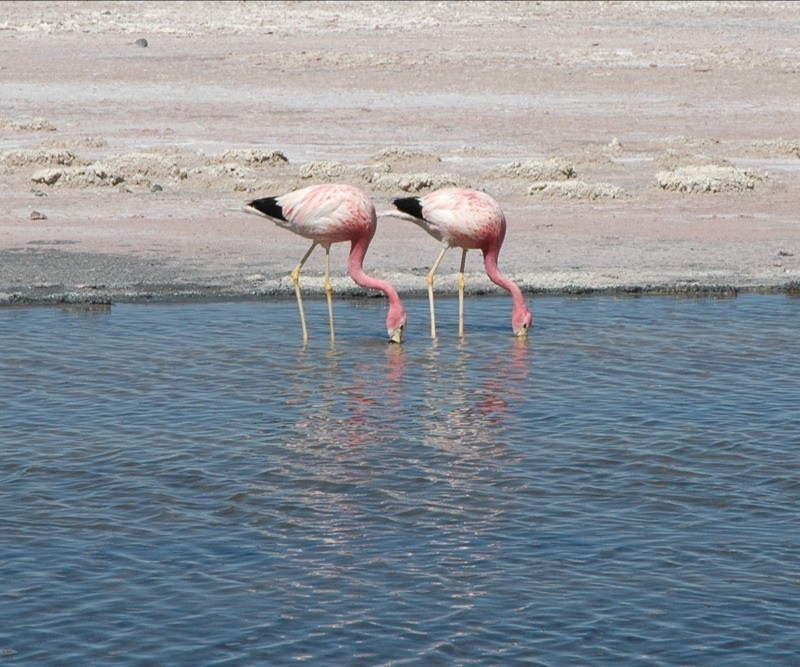
Andean flamingos

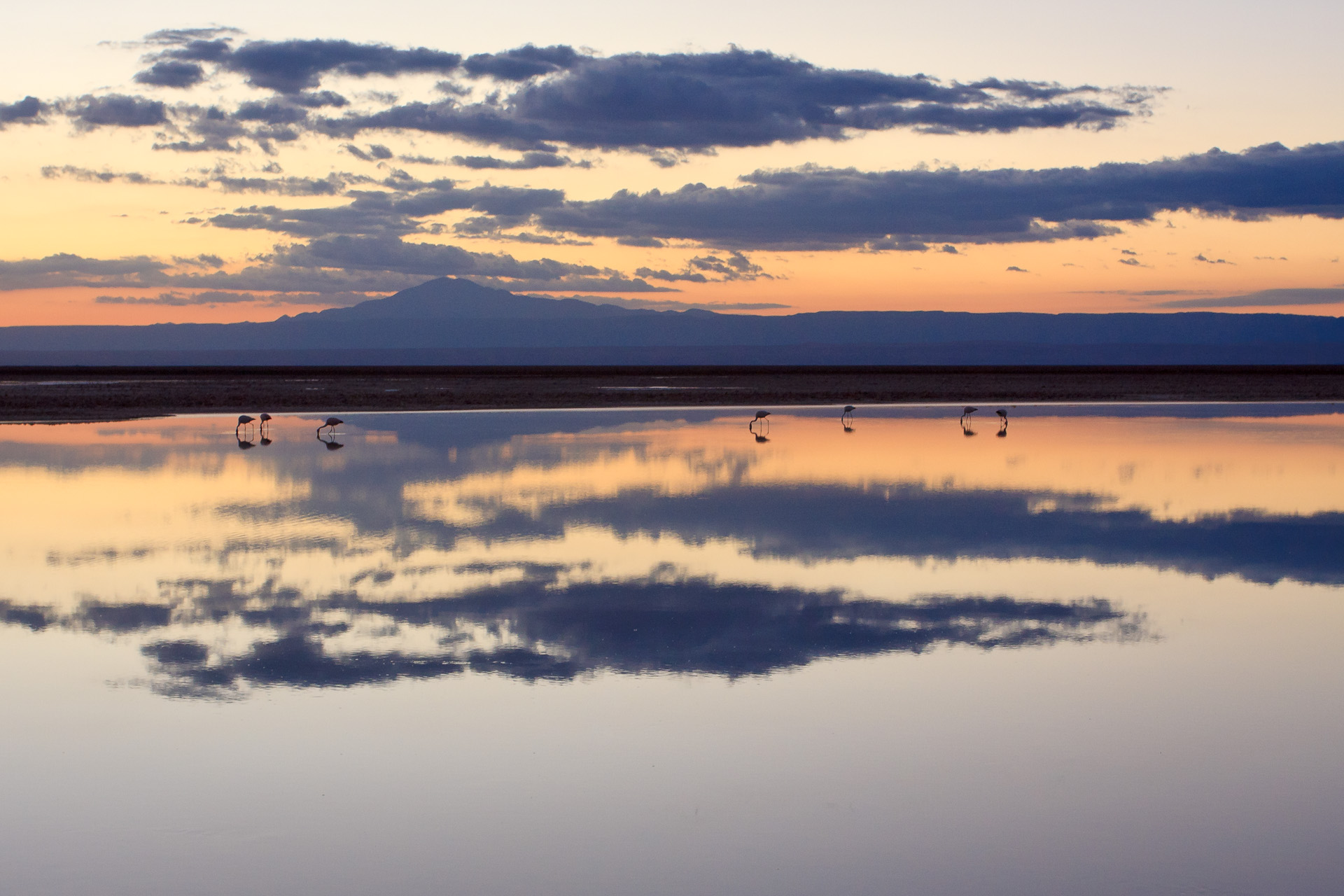
Sunset over Salar de Atacama

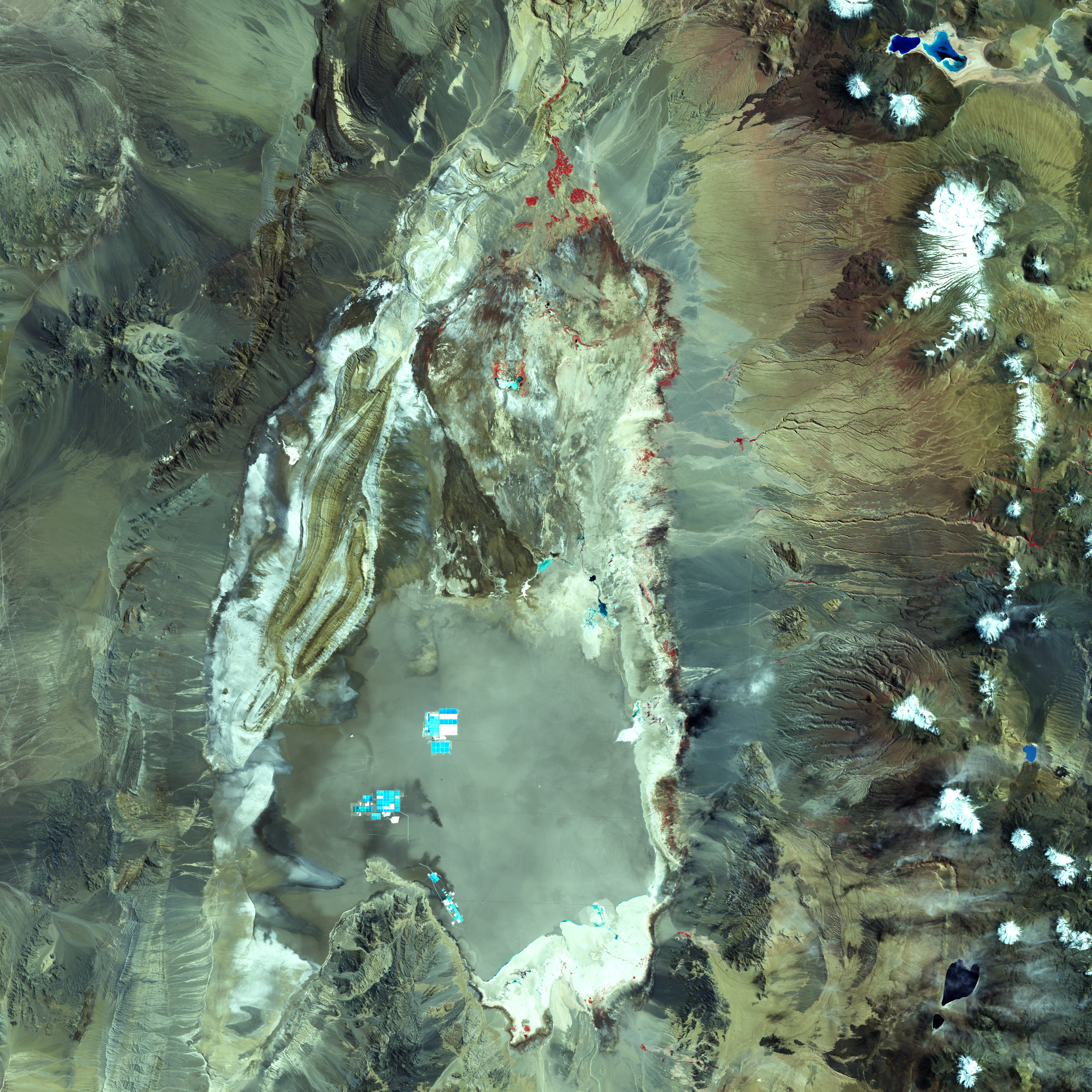
False-color image by Landsat 7 satellite

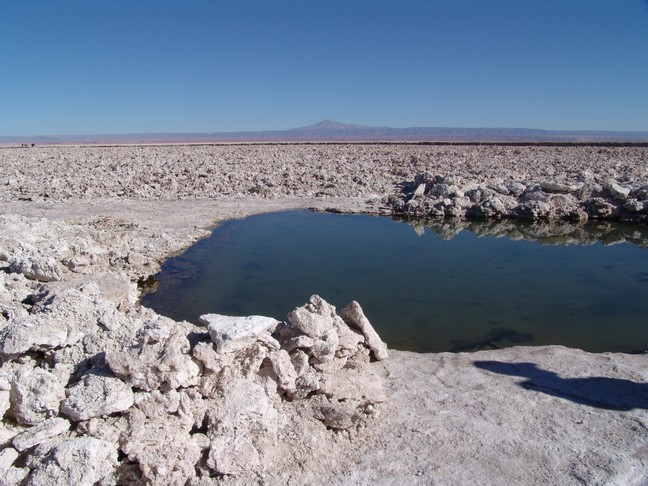
Salar de Atacama, 2300 meters above sea level

== Bibliography ==
- Gerardo Díaz del Río; Ramiro Bonilla Parra; Fernando Peralta Toro (1972). Geología de superficie, sub-superficie y geoquímica del Salar de Atacama (in Spanish). Chile: CORFO. Departamento de Recursos Hidráulicos.
- Seth Fletcher (2011). Bottled Lightning: Superbatteries, Electric Cars, and the New Lithium Economy. New York: Hill and Wang. ISBN 978-0-8090-3053-8.
- H. Alonso; F. Risacher (1996). "Geoquímica del Salar de Atacama, parte 1: origen de los componentes y balance salino". Revista Geológica de Chile (in Spanish). 23 (2).
- Stephanie Kampf; S. Tyler; C. Ortiz; J. F. Muñoz; P. Adkins (2005). "Evaporation and land surface energy budget at the Salar de Atacama, Northern Chile". Journal of Hydrology. 310 (1–4): 236. Bibcode:2005JHyd..310..236K. doi:10.1016/j.jhydrol.2005.01.005.
- López, Felipe A. (2025). "Abriendo la caja de Pandora: El salar de Atacama, la energía solar y el litio". In Arenas Coronil, Carlos (ed.). Historia de la Energía en la Región del Sol (in Spanish). RIL Editores. pp. 171–198. ISBN 978-956--01-1706-9.
