= Liolaemus puritamensis =

Conservation status
- Least Concern (IUCN 3.1)

Scientific classification
- Kingdom: Animalia
- Phylum: Chordata
- Class: Reptilia
- Order: Squamata
- Suborder: Iguania
- Family: Liolaemidae
- Genus: Liolaemus
- Species: L. puritamensis

Binomial name
- Liolaemus puritamensis Núñez & Fox, 1989

Species of lizard

Liolaemus puritamensis is a species of lizard in the family Iguanidae. It is found in Argentina and Chile.
