= Juriques =

Stratovolcano between Bolivia and Chile

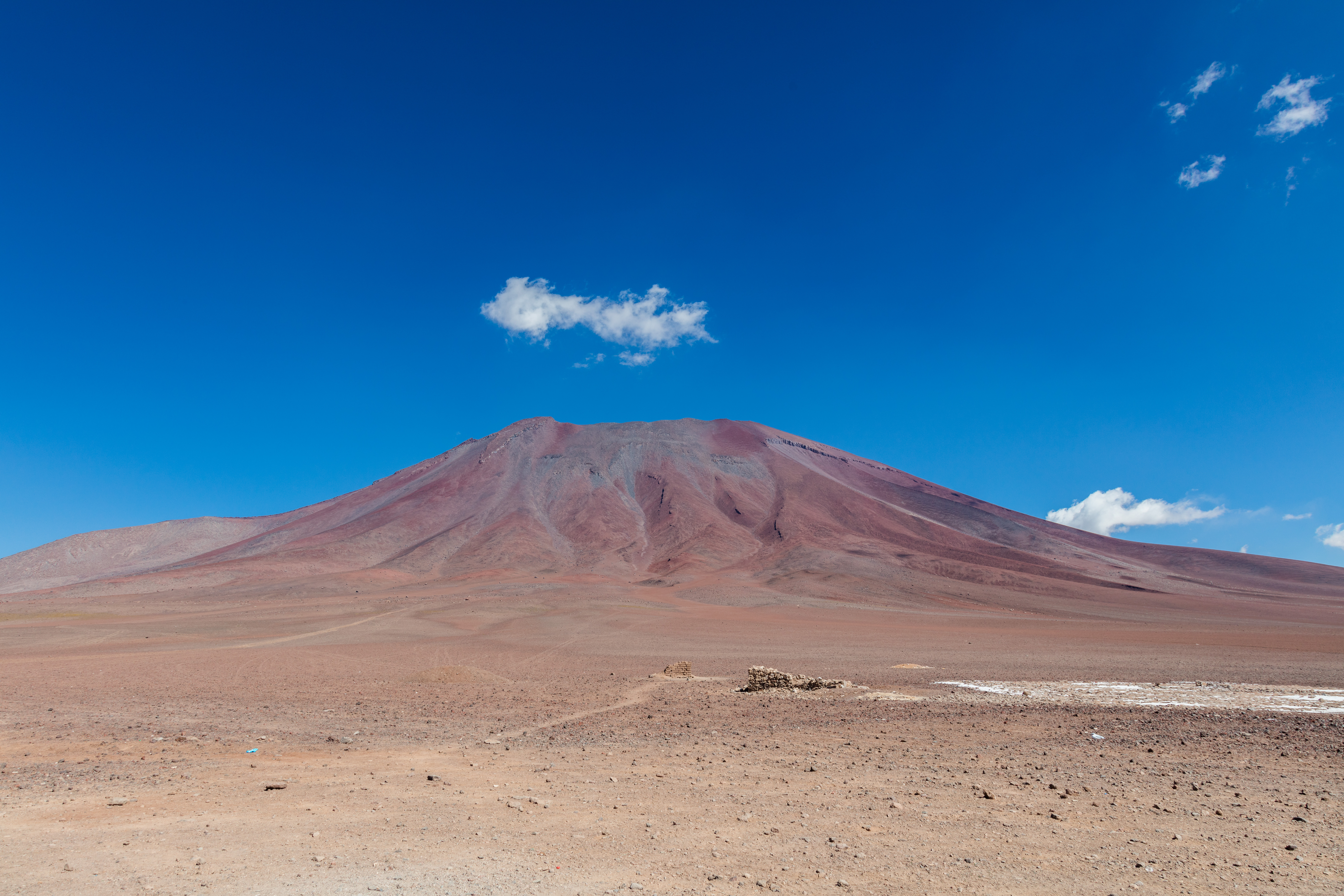
- Far view of Juriques

Highest point
- Elevation: 5,704 m (18,714 ft)
- Coordinates: 22°50′47″S 67°49′28″W

Geography
- Location: Bolivia-Chile
- Parent range: Andes

Geology
- Mountain type: Stratovolcano

Juriques is a stratovolcano on the border between Bolivia and Chile. It is located immediately southeast of Licancabur volcano. Its summit is at 5,704 m (18,714 ft) with a crater 1.5 km (0.93 mi) in its widest diameter. Laguna Verde lies at the foot of this volcano. There are archaeological sites on its summit or its environs.

== Gallery ==
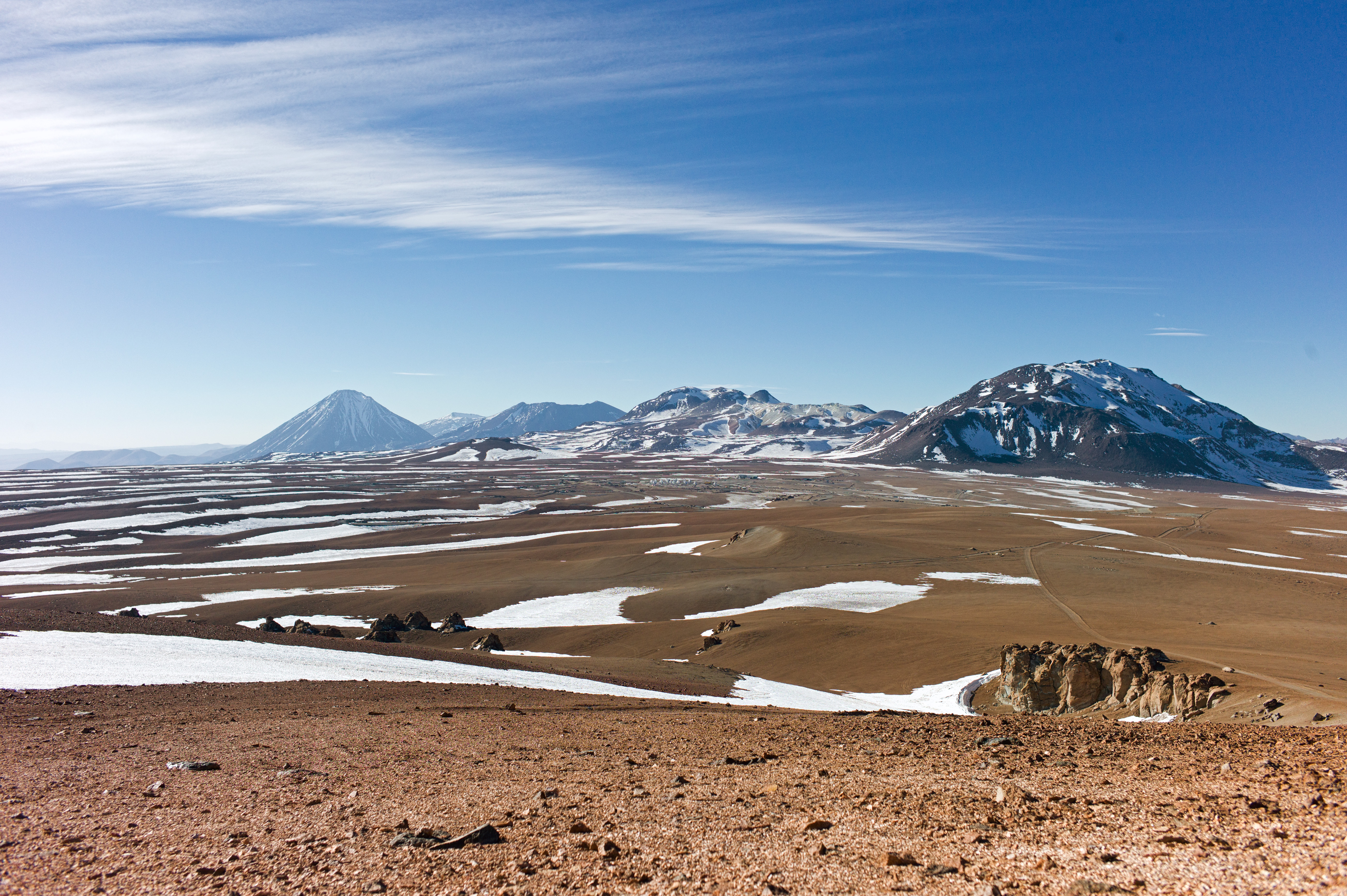
Stratovolcano Juriques and the Atacama Large Millimeter Array.
