= Atacama people =

Indigenous people of South America

Ckunza; Likanantaí
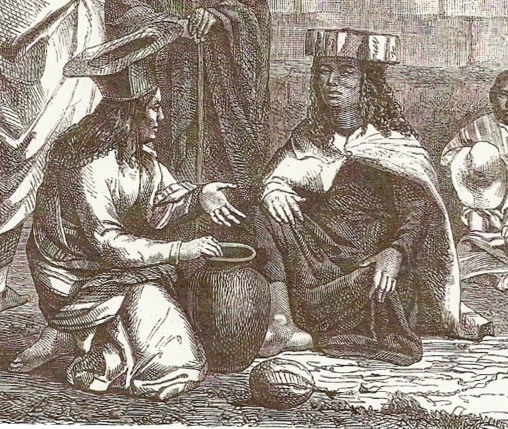

Regions with significant populations
- Chile: 30,369 (2017)
- Argentina: 13,936 (2010)

Languages
- Spanish, Kunza

Religion
- Christian, Inca cult

The Atacama people, also called Atacameño, are an Indigenous people from the Atacama Desert and altiplano region in the north of Chile and Argentina and southern Bolivia, mainly the Antofagasta Region.

According to the Argentinean Census in 2010, 13,936 people identified as first-generation Atacameño in Argentina, while Chile was home to 21,015 Atacameño people as of 2002.

Other names include Kunza and Likanantaí. (Note: Also spelled Likan-antai)

Indigenous peoples of Chile

== History ==
The origins of Atacameño culture can be traced back to 500 AD. The Tiwanaku people were the first known conquerors. At the start of the 15th century, the Atacameño were conquered by the Incan emperor Topa Inca Yupanqui, who introduced a new social order, the Inca sun cult and various customs including coca leaves. The Inca regime constructed roads from the Salar de Atacama to what is now northeast Argentina.

In 1536, the first Spanish conquistadors, those of Diego de Almagro, arrived in the area. It was annexed under Spanish control in 1557. In the 18th century, the Atacameño Tomás Paniri joined the uprisings led by the Peruvian Túpac Amaru II and the Bolivian Túpac Katari. In 1824, the region became part of Bolivia and in 1879 fell into Chilean hands. In 2007, the Atacameño population was estimated at 21,015 people.

In 2021, Ximena Anza was elected to serve as the representative of the Atacameño people for a reserved seat in the Constitutional Convention.

== Culture ==
The Atacameños protected their villages with strong stone walls known as pukara, a Quechua word. They also developed ceramic crafts, copper work (using copper extracted from Chuquicamata) and gold work. Many of the historic settlements still exist today with the same names, including Quitor, Chiu-Chiu, Lasana, Turi, Topayín, Susques, Calama, Toconao, Antofagasta de la Sierra, and one of the most important settlements in the region, San Pedro de Atacama.

=== Language ===
The original language of the Atacameños was the recently extinct language of Kunza.

In the small settlements around Cordillera Domeyko and Salar de Atacama, both within the traditional lands of the Likan Antay, there are residents that speak Spanish without yeísmo which is otherwise a widespread feature of Chilean Spanish.

Atacameño gallery
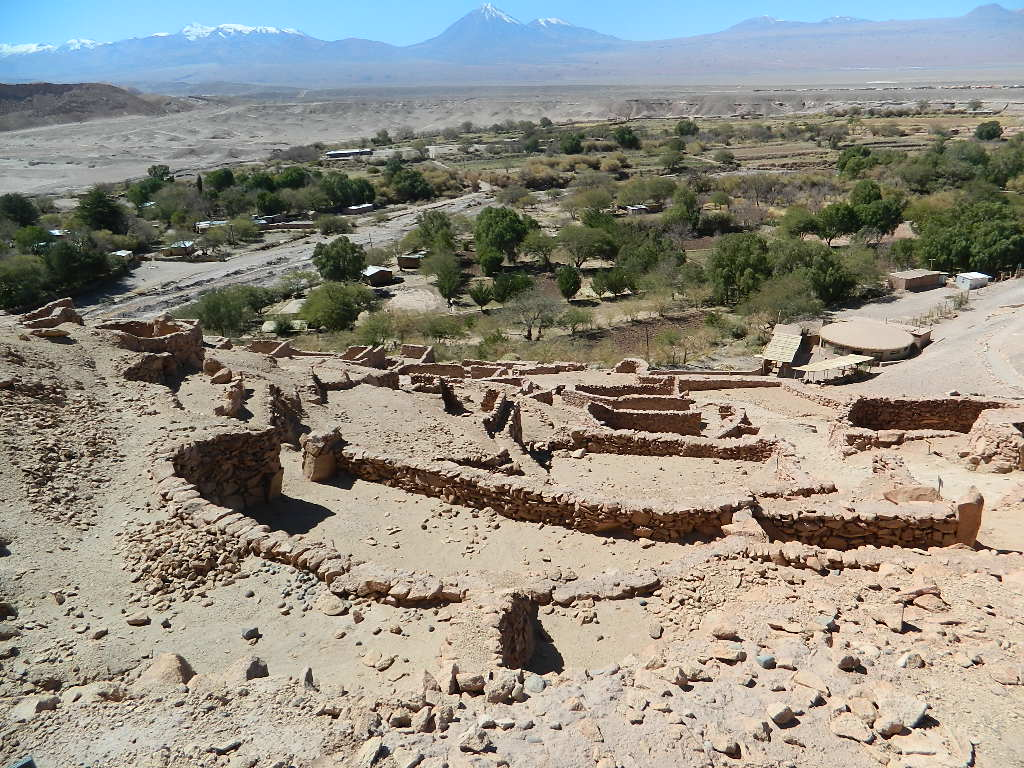
Pukará de Quitor

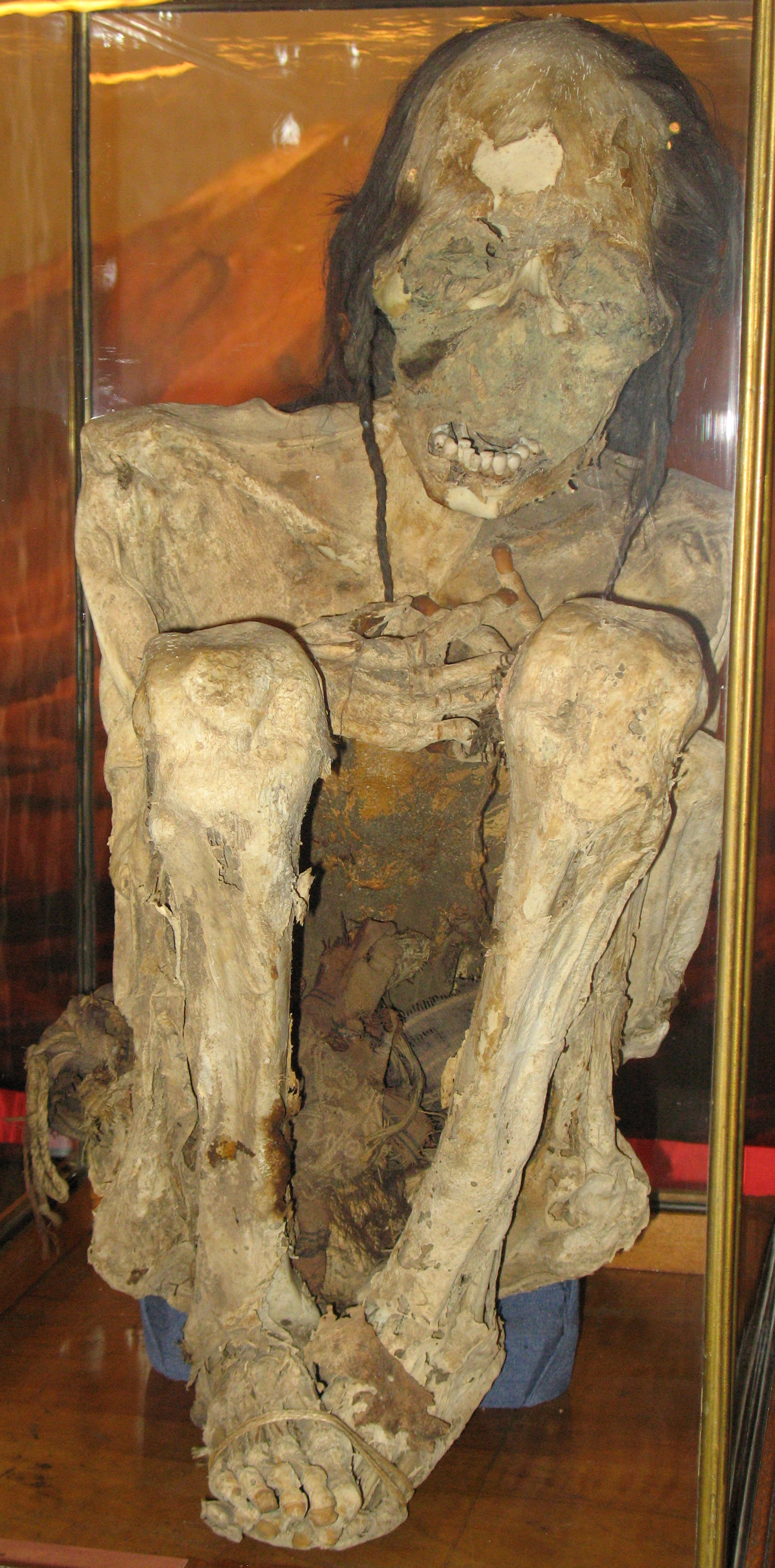
Mummy found in the Atacama Desert

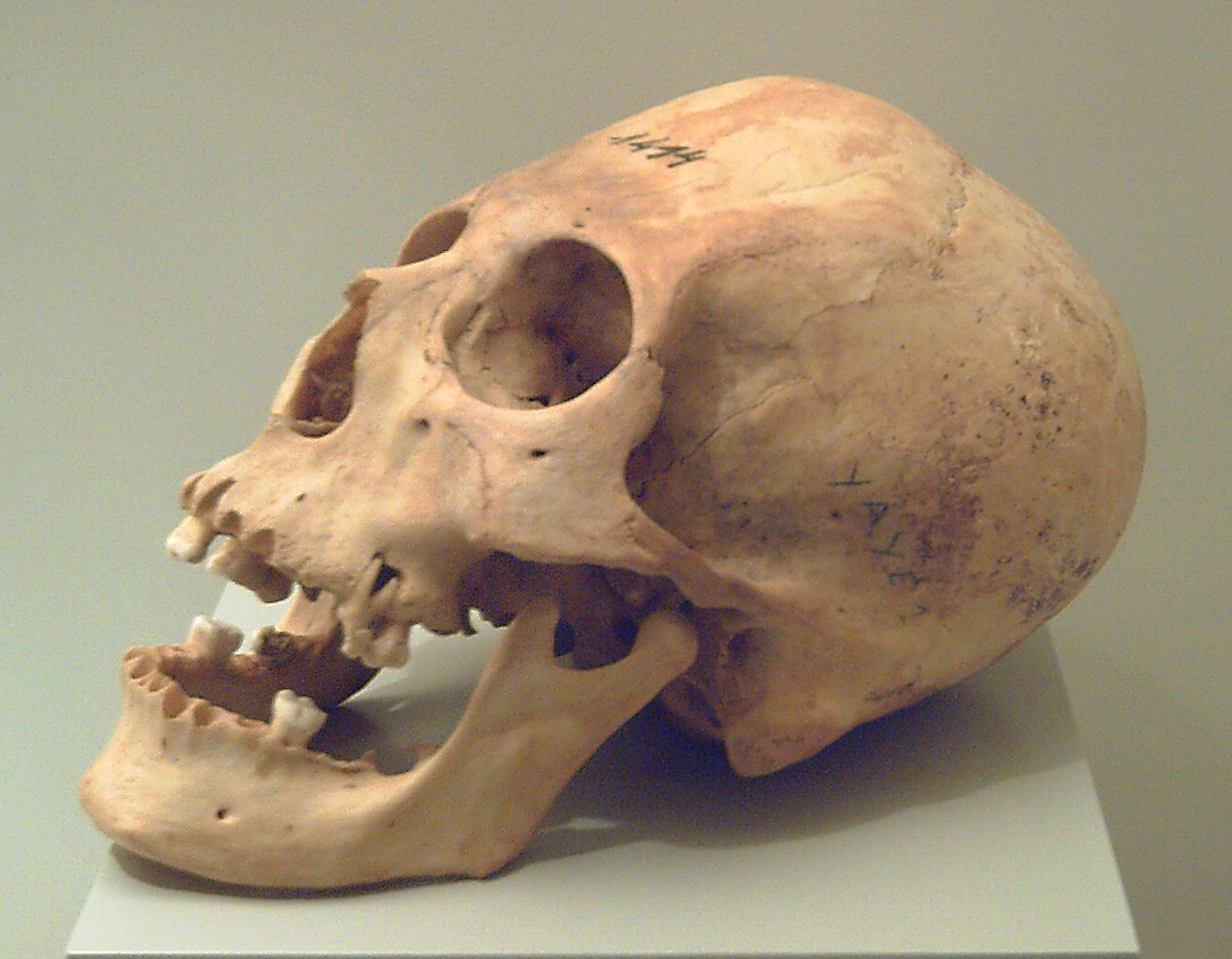
A deformed Atacameño skull

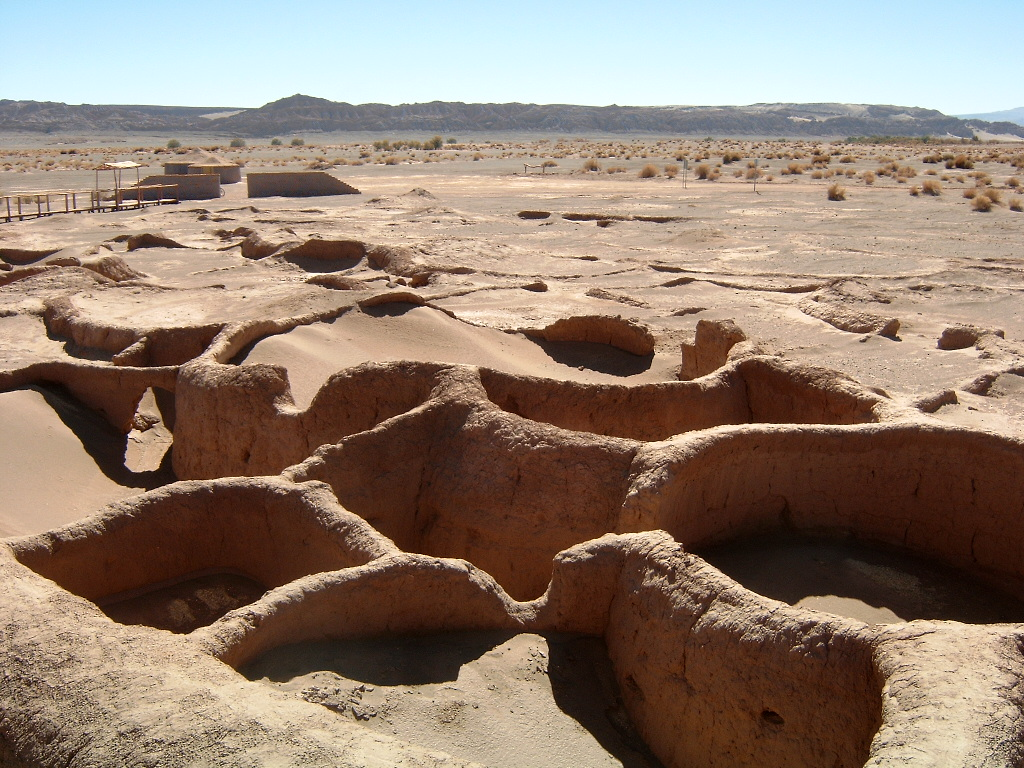
Tulor settlement in the Atacama Desert

=== Cuisine ===
The Atacameño were lamini herders who made best use of the scarce water and sparse terrain by using their livestock - llama and alpaca - both as pack animals and for their meat, hide and wool.

Like many other Andean people, the Atacameño created a terraced agriculture to prevent water run-off. They grew various crops, including pumpkins, zucchini, chili, beans, tobacco, melon, corn, and, above all, potatoes and quinoa. They fertilized the crops with guano from seabirds, which they transported inland on llama. They also ate meat from their livestock and bought fish and shellfish from coastal peoples in return for ch'arki, a dried, salted meat they produced.

=== Ceramics ===
The first period, between the years of 400 AD and 900 AD, saw the Atacameño produce pink glazed pottery, including anthropomorphic jugs, as well as golden jewelry and cups.

During the second period, between 900 AD and 1200 AD, black glaze pottery was used, showing the influence of Tiwanaku culture. Artifacts included tablets for inhaling hallucinogens from the Huilco tree and San Pedro cactus, with carved images of human figurines, condors and religious objects.

In the third period, from 1200 AD to 1500 AD, shows the influence of the Inca civilization with the construction of stone “pukara” fortresses.

=== Religion ===
Smoking hallucinogenic substances was a central part of Atacameño religious culture. Smoking ceremonies were believed to bring humans closer to the gods, allowing the smoker to take on the power of birds, cats or snakes. Finely carved tablets were used to hold the drug, which was then inhaled using wooden or bone tubes. The Atacameños also adopted the Inca sun cult and constructed altars in high places, especially on Licancabur volcano, which was considered sacred and the home of their many gods. They believed in life after death and buried their dead with all the necessary belongings they would need for the journey.

== Archeological centres and museums ==
=== San Pedro de Atacama ===
San Pedro de Atacama was the Atacameños primary oasis settlement and the centre of their cultural development. Today, tourism is its main economic activity along with agriculture.

=== R.P. Gustavo Le Paige Archeological Museum ===
The R.P. Gustavo Le Paige Archeological Museum, located in San Pedro de Atacama, holds much of the historical and archeological remains of the Atacameño people. It was founded by the Belgian Jesuit priest Gustavo Le Paige, who moved to San Pedro in 1955 and became fascinated with Atacameño culture. Over the years he collected a wide range of artifacts from ancient burial sites, workshops and settlements, housing them in the museum which bears his name, which he founded in 1963. The collection now contains mummies and more than 380,000 pieces of ceramics, textiles and metallic artifacts.

== Communities ==
Atacameño communities currently living in Argentina include:

Jujuy, Argentina

- Comunidad aborigen Pórtico de los Andes (de Susques)
- Comunidad aborigen de Catua
- Comunidad aborigen de Coranzulí
- Comunidad aborigen de Huancar
- Comunidad aborigen de Olaroz Chico
- Comunidad aborigen del Valle de Piscuno (de San Juan de Quillaques)
- Comunidad aborigen El Toro (de Rosario de Susques)
- Comunidad aborigen Los Manantiales (de Pastos Chicos)
- Comunidad aborigen Paso de Jama
- Comunidad aborigen Termas de Tuzgle (de Puesto Sey)

Salta province, Argentina

- Comunidad Cerro Negro (de La Poma)
- Comunidad Esquina de Guardia (atacama)
- Comunidad de Tipan (atacama)
- Comunidad lickan antay de corralitos (atacama)
- Comunidad indígena atacama de Rangel (kolla-atacama)

Catamarca province, departamentos Antofagasta de la Sierra y Santa María

- Comunidad indígena de Antofalla (en Antofalla y Loro Huasi) (kolla-atacama)
- Alijilán
- Amadores
- Andalhualá
- Anillaco
- Anquincila
- Antofalla
- Apoyaco

Atacameño communities currently living in Chile include:

Calama communities, Chile

- Taira.
- Lasana.
- San Francisco de Chiuchiu.
- Ayquina.
- Caspana.
- Yalquincha.
- Likan Tatai.
- Topater.
- La Banda.

San Pedro de Atacama communities, Chile

- Río Grande.
- Machuca.
- Matancilla.
- Catarpe.
- Quitor.
- San Pedro de Atacama.
- Yayé.
- Tchecar.
- Sequitor.
- Larache.
- Coyo.
- Solor.
- Solcor.
- Toconao.
- Camar.
- Talabre.
- Socaire.
- Peine.

== See also ==
- Indigenous peoples in Chile
- Kunza
- Atacama Desert
