= Susques Department =

Susques Departamento Susques
- Department
- Interactive map of Susques
- Coordinates: 23°35′00″S 66°40′50″W
- Country: Argentina
- Province: Jujuy
- Seat: Susques

Area
  - Total: 9,199 km^{2} (3,552 sq mi)

Population (2022)
  - Total: 4,098
  - Density: 0.4455/km^{2} (1.154/sq mi)
- Important Cities: Susques; Coranzuli; Catua; San Juan de Quillaques; Huáncar; El Toro; Pastos Chicos; Pairique Chico; Puesto Sey; Jama

Susques is a department of the province of Jujuy (Argentina). It has an area of 9,199km² and it had a population of 3.791 as of 2010, 1.901 were men and 1.890 were women.

== History ==
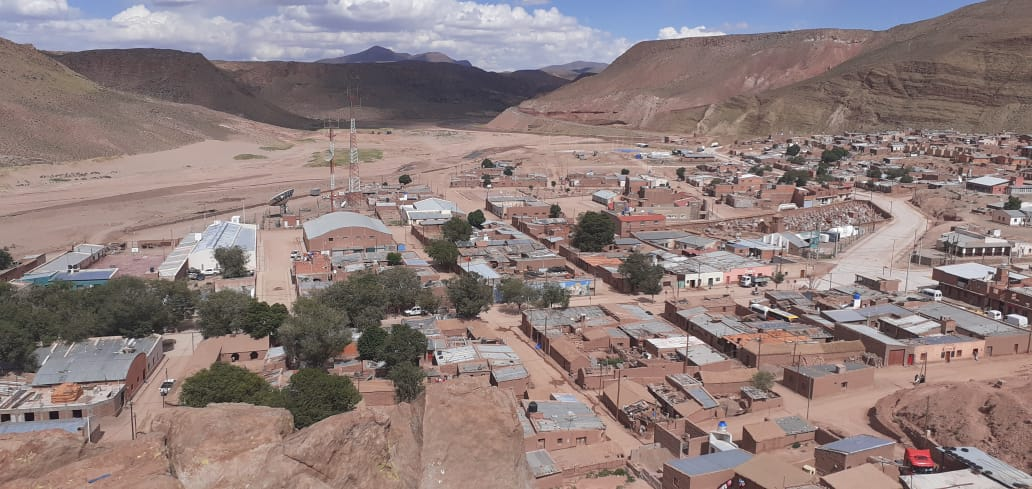
The Town of Susques.

By the treaty of May 10, 1889 with Bolivia, Argentina renounced its claim on Tarija and part of the Chaco Boreal, and Bolivia, in compensation, ceded the Puna de Atacama, which was in the power of Chile after the Pacific War (1879-1880). This action granted Argentina a territory that was part of the Viceroyalty of the Río de la Plata, but which was in fact in the hands of Chile. As Chile refused to hand over the territories ceded by Bolivia, it was decided to submit the issue to the arbitration of the American diplomat William Insco Buchanan, who in 1899 awarded three fourths of the disputed territory to Argentina and the rest to Chile. By Law No. 3906 of January 9, 1900, the Territorio Nacional de los Andes (National Territory of the Andes) was organized. By decree of May 12, 1900, the National Executive Branch divided the Territory of the Andes into three administrative departments, the northernmost being that of "Susques or del Norte", which bordered to the east with the province of Jujuy and to the north with Bolivia.
