= R. P. Gustavo Le Paige Archaeological Museum =

Coordinates: 22°54′37″S 68°11′59″W

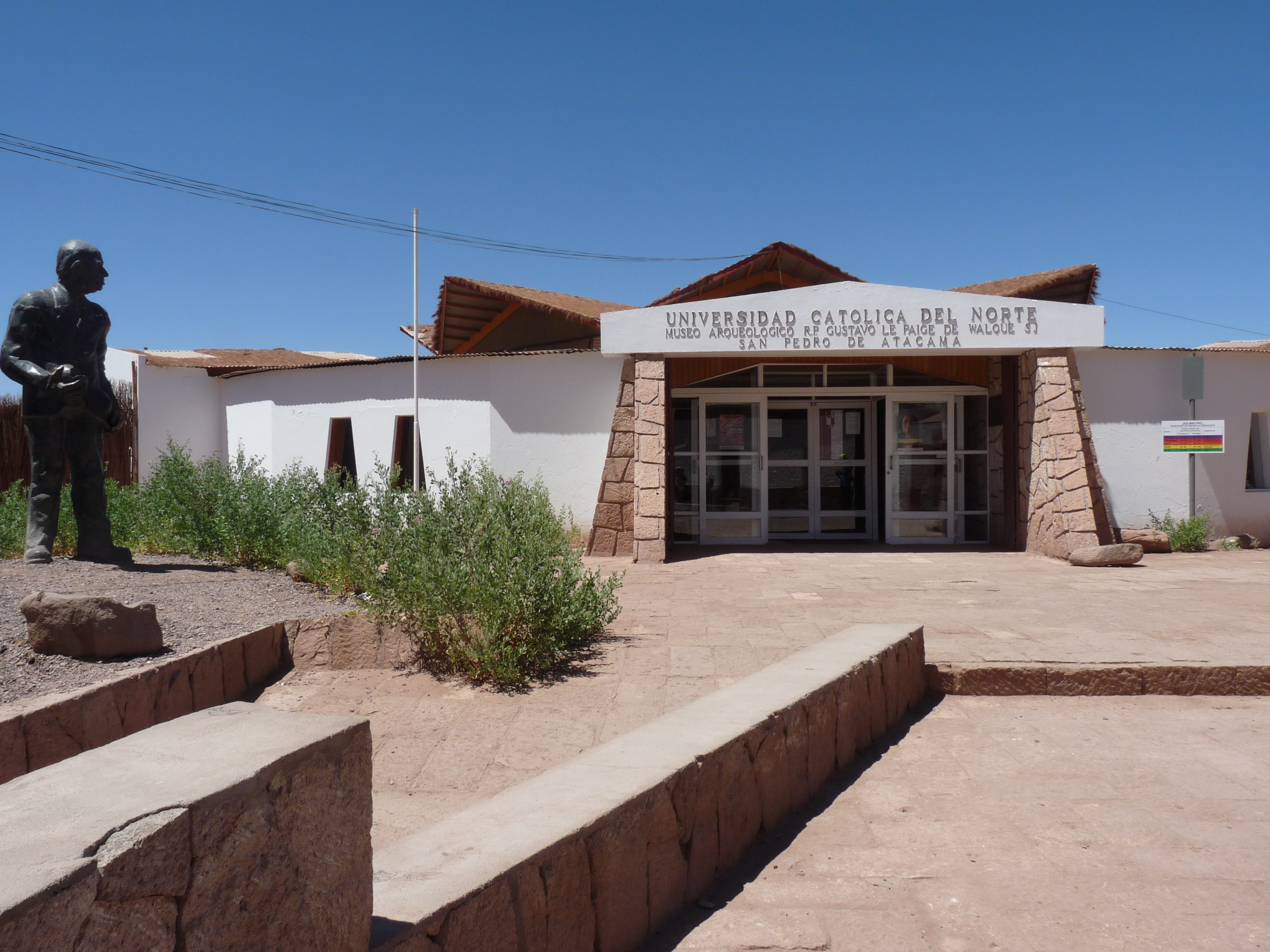
R. P. Gustavo Le Paige Archaeological Museum in San Pedro de Atacama, with Father Le Paige's statue on the left

R. P. Gustavo Le Paige Archaeological Museum is a museum located in San Pedro de Atacama, Chile. It houses a collection of about 380,000 pre-Columbian artifacts from the Atacameño culture. The museum is named after Jesuit missionary Father Gustavo Le Paige, who was its founder.

This museum belongs to the Catholic University of the North. It closed in September 2015 for refurbishment and redevelopment and reopened in late 2016.

== See also ==
- Museo Regional de Atacama
- Tocopilla Museum
