= Puritama Hot Springs =

- Termas Baños de Puritama
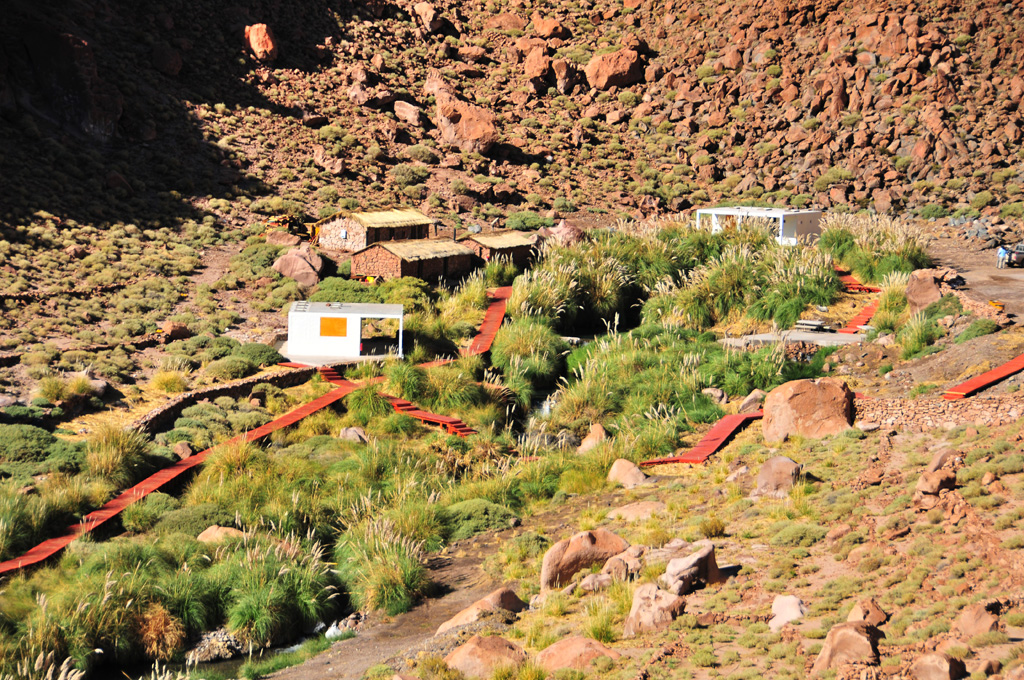
- Interactive map of Puritama Hot Springs
- Location: San Pedro de Atacama, Chile
- Coordinates: 22°43′15″S 68°02′41″W
- Elevation: 3,500 meters (11,500 feet)
- Type: River
- Frequency: Constant
- Duration: Constant
- Temperature: 33.5 °C (92.3 °F)

Puritama Hot Springs (Spanish: Termas Baños de Puritama) is a series of eight large pools of geothermal spring water located at the bottom of a canyon in the Atacama Desert, in the Antofagasta Region in the north of Chile. It is located at an altitude of 3,475 meters above sea level, 30 km northeast of the town and commune of San Pedro de Atacama and 348 km northeast of Antofagasta, and is a popular tourist attraction.

The springs stretch over a length of about 1 kilometre (0.62 mi) of the Puritama River, which has cut a winding valley. Travertine deposits have been reported from the area.

== Attractions ==
The hot springs are managed by now, since 2011, the Explora hotel, charging for $35,000 Chilean pesos to get in (Spanish: Consejo de pueblos Atacameños) who are responsible for maintaining the modern tourist facilities. Facilities include the outdoor pools connected by wooden footpaths, some waterfalls, and changing rooms. The town of San Pedro de Atacama was declared a “traditional zone” (Spanish: "Zona típica") in 1980. In 2007, the springs were the subject of a legal controversy between the hotel and the Atacameno community, with the latter charging that the hotel was taking over the springs.

Nearby, other places to visit include the Valley of the Moon, Atacama Salt Flat, the characteristic town of Toconao, Los Flamencos National Reserve and the El Tatio Geysers.

== Activities ==
The Puritama Hot Springs were known for centuries and used for medicinal purposes by the local Atacama people, or Atacameño. However, they only opened to the public relatively recently. The sodium sulfate waters are recommended for rheumatism, arthritis, stress, physical fatigue and other ailments.

== See also ==
- Puyehue Hot Springs
- Los Flamencos National Reserve
- Laguna Miscanti
- Valle de la Luna (Chile)
- Salar de Atacama
