= Museo Regional de Atacama =

Museum in Copiapó, Atacama, Chile

Coordinates: 27°21′47.11″S 70°20′23.94″W

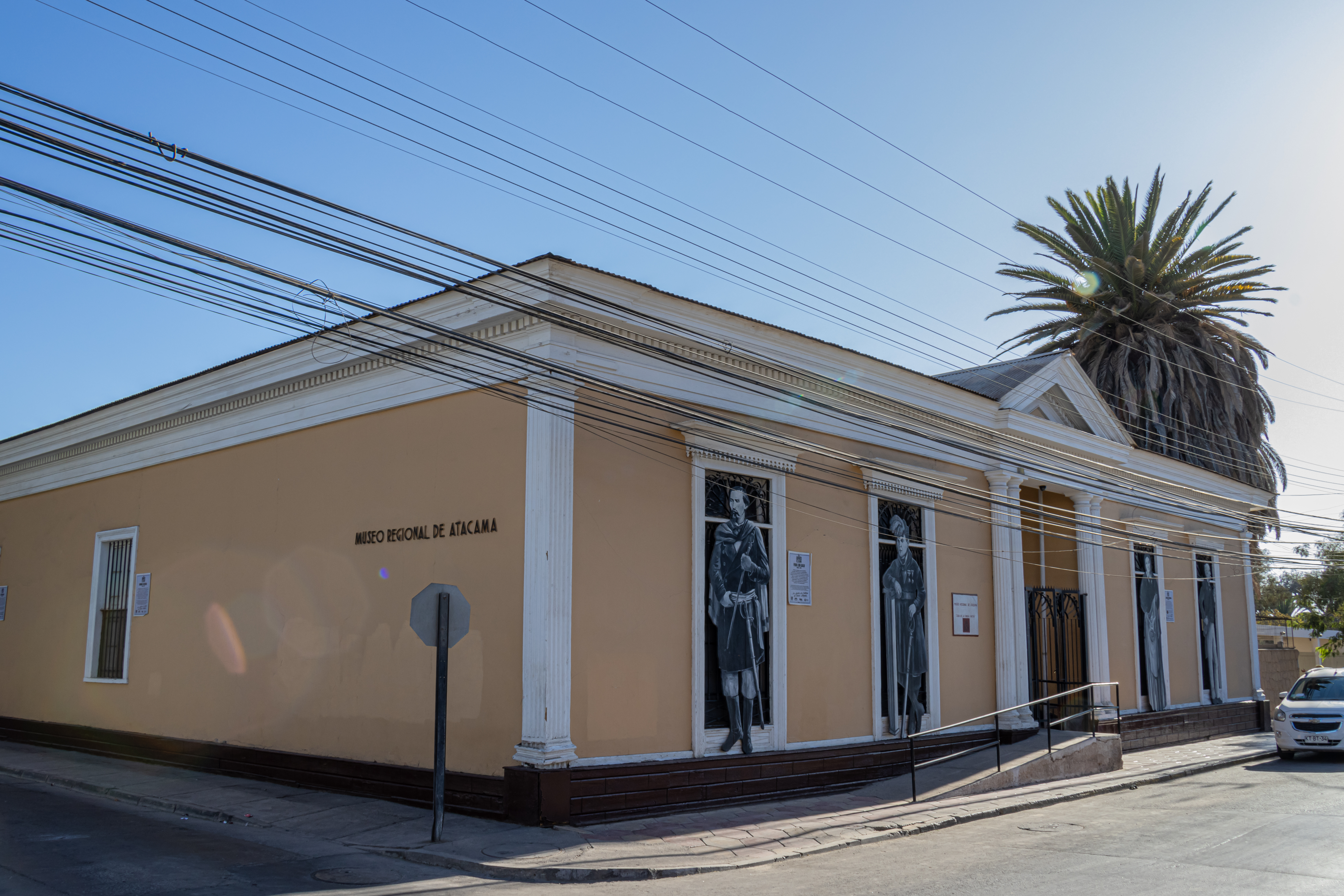
Museum exterior

Museo Regional de Atacama is a museum in the Chilean city of Copiapó, the capital of Atacama Region. The museum had 2,117 visitors in 2020.

== See also ==
- R. P. Gustavo Le Paige Archaeological Museum
- Tocopilla Museum
