= Galleguillos =

Galleguillos is a surname. Notable people with the surname include:

- Félix Galleguillos (born 1986), Chilean politician
- Gabriel Galleguillos (born 1944), Chilean footballer
