= Litoral Department =

Former department of Bolivia

Littoral
- Department of Bolivia
- 1825–1904
- Flag

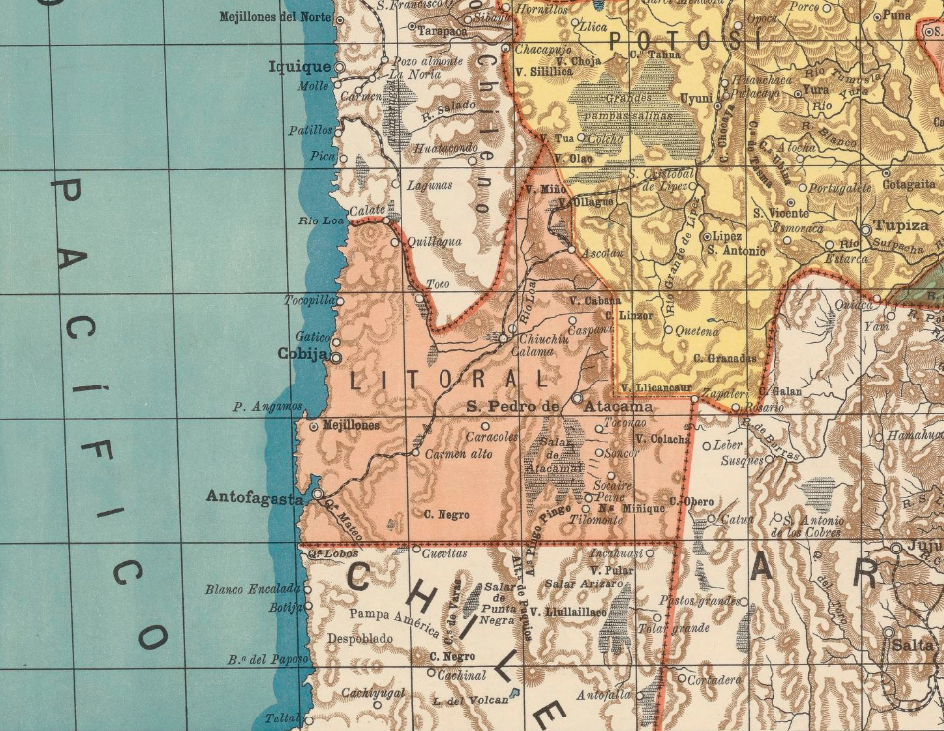
- The Litoral Department in 1894 (Note: From the Mapa Elemental de Bolivia, 1894.)
- Capital: La Mar (1867–1875); Antofagasta (1875–1879)
- Demonym: Litorense
- Area
  - 1879: 154,393 km^{2} (59,611 sq mi)
- Population
  - 1879: 15,000
- Historical era: 19th Century
  - Created as Atacama Department: 29 January 1825
  - Reorganized as the Litoral Province: 1 July 1829
  - Reorganized as the Litoral District: c. 26 October 1839
  - Reorganized as the Litoral Department: 2 January 1867
  - Chilean Invasion of Antofagasta: 14 February 1879
  - War of the Pacific begins: 5 April 1879
  - Treaty of Valparaiso: 4 April 1884
  - Antofagasta Province created by Chile: September 1888
  - Ceded to Chile: 20 October 1904
Preceded by	Succeeded by
Potosí Department	Antofagasta Province
- Today part of: Chile

Littoral, also known as Atacama, (Note: Spanish: Departamento del Litoral; Spanish: Departamento de Atacama.) was a department of Bolivia. The term is also used to describe the Bolivian coast in the Atacama Desert included in the country's territory from its inception in 1825 until 1879, when it was lost to Chile.

== History ==
The Atacama Desert and the Puna in 1830.

When Bolivia emerged in 1825 as an independent state, these territories were part of the Bolivian Potosí Department. During the government of Andrés de Santa Cruz, the territories were established as the Department of the Litoral.

The main towns on the Pacific coast, from north to south, were Tocopilla, Cobija, Mejillones and Antofagasta.

The port of Paposo was taken from the colony as the capital of the coast Atacameño. After it consolidated its independence, Chile executed various acts of sovereignty on the northern desert coast. It established its territory throughout the coast to the mouth of the River Loa, forming a border with Peru. Chile would have expanded more, but this was prevented by Bolivia establishing the city of Cobija.

=== Treaties ===
Borders before the war

The treaty of 1866 established the border between the two States on the 24° parallel, creating an area of common interest between 23 and 25 degrees south latitude.

The treaty of 1874, which established the final boundary between the two nations on the 24° parallel, provided that for a period of 25 years, new taxes shall not be imposed on the Chilean people and companies based in the area.

Chile was willing to move down the coast from the desert to allow Bolivia a sovereign outlet to the ocean, under the conditions seen before. This eliminated the area of common interest from the treaty of 1866.

Bolivia and Peru, bound by a secret treaty of defensive alliance since 1873 (one year before the border treaty with Chile), were defeated by Chile in the War of the Pacific which lasted until 1884, costing Bolivia its coast and Peru its department of Tarapacá. Though the coast was a valuable source of saltpeter, it was not the cause.

== Administrative divisions ==
In 1875 the capital of the department was moved from La Mar (today Cobija) to Antofagasta. When the War of the Pacific broke out in 1879, the divisions of the department were as follows:

Provinces	Capital
Mejillones	Antofagasta
Cobija	La Mar
Loa	Tocopilla
Caracoles	Caracoles
Atacama	San Pedro de Atacama

== Claim ==
Since then, Bolivia retains the policy of a territorial claim of a sovereign outlet to the Pacific Ocean. As part of this policy, the national coat of arms shows 10 stars: the 9 current departments and the tenth representing the former Litoral Department.

The internal communications of the armed forces carried the slogan in the footnotes: "The sea is ours by right. To recover it is a duty." (in Spanish, "El mar es nuestro por derecho, recuperarlo es un deber").

Día del Mar is celebrated annually in Bolivia. During the week long event, Bolivia reasserts their claim to their lost territory; some of the celebrations contain anti-Chilean statements.

== See also ==
- War of the Pacific
- Atacama Desert border dispute
- Consequences of the War of the Pacific
- Battle of Río Grande
- Puna de Atacama dispute
- Landlocked country
- Bolivia–Chile relations
- Anti-Chilean sentiment
- Bolivia Mar
