= Streptomyces atacamensis =

Scientific classification
- Domain: Bacteria
- Kingdom: Bacillati
- Phylum: Actinomycetota
- Class: Actinomycetia
- Order: Streptomycetales
- Family: Streptomycetaceae
- Genus: Streptomyces
- Species: S. atacamensis

Binomial name
- Streptomyces atacamensis Santhanam et al. 2012

Type strain
- CGMCC 4.7018, KACC 15492, strain C60

Species of bacterium

Streptomyces atacamensis is a bacterium species from the genus Streptomyces which has been isolated from soil from the Atacama Desert in Valle de la Luna in Chile.

== See also ==
- List of Streptomyces species
