= Amadores =

Municipality and village in Catamarca Province, northwest Argentina

Coordinates: 28°17′S 65°39′W

- Municipality and village
- Interactive map of Amadores
- Country: Argentina
- Province: Catamarca Province
- Time zone: UTC−3 (ART)

Amadores is a village and municipality in Catamarca Province in northwestern Argentina.

== See also ==
- Atacama people
