= Apoyaco =

Coordinates: 28°18′S 66°09′W

- Municipality and village
- Flag

- Country: Argentina
- Province: Catamarca Province
- Elevation: 5,020 ft (1,530 m)
- Time zone: UTC−3 (ART)

Apoyaco is a village and municipality in Catamarca Province in northwestern Argentina bordering Chle. The indigenous Atacama people live in this province and village. The village and region is home to lamini, alpaca and llama herding as well as farming pumpkins, zucchini, chili, beans, tobacco, melon, corn, potatoes, and quinoa.

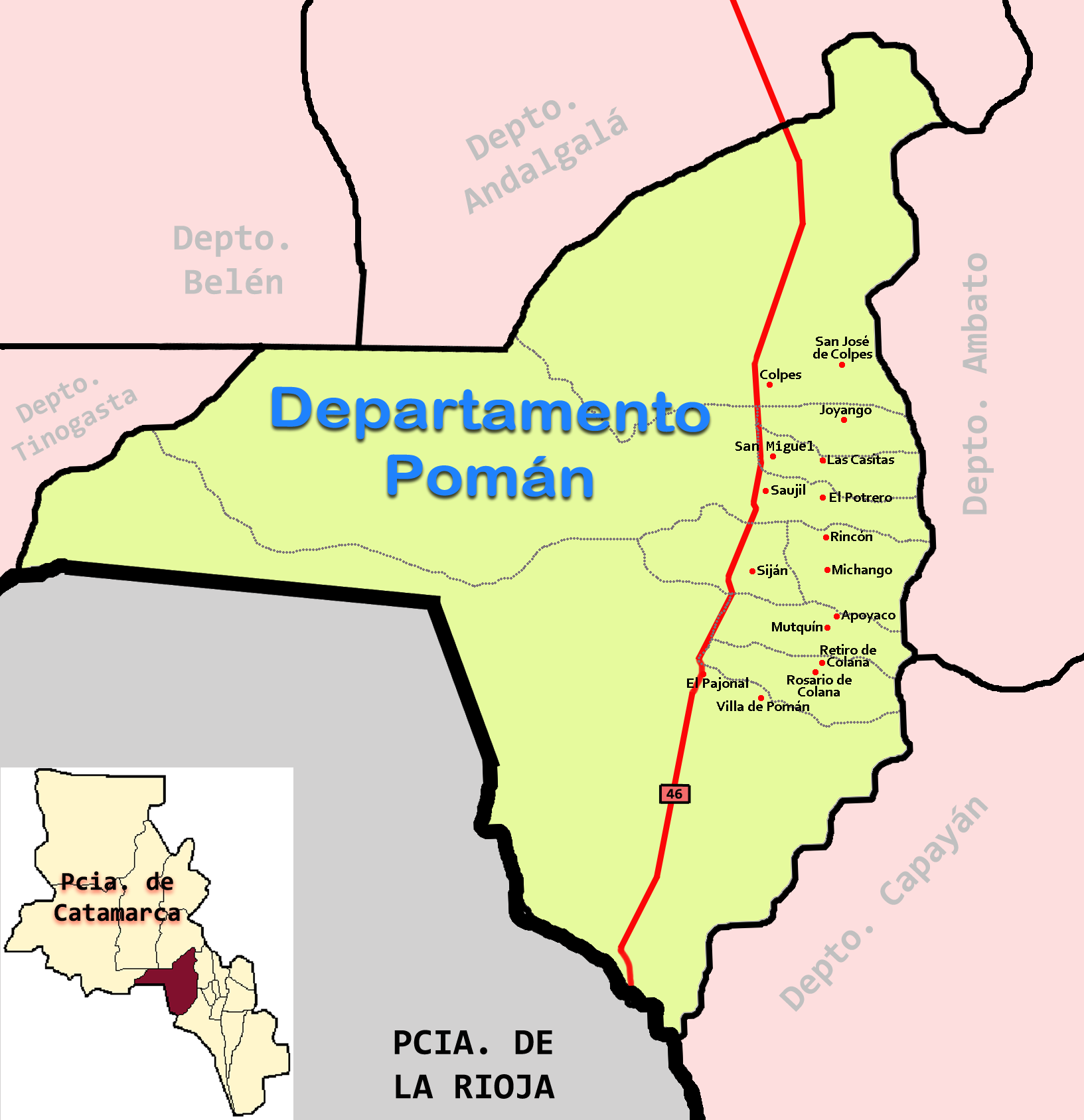
Departamento Pomán

== See also ==
- Atacama people
- Catamarca Province
- Argentina
