= Pairique Chico =

- Village
- Location in Argentina
- Coordinates: 23°02′07″S 66°49′00″W
- Country: Argentina
- Province: Jujuy
- Department: Susques
- Elevation: 4,340 m (14,240 ft)

Population (2010 census [INDEC])
  - Total: 100
- Time zone: UTC−3 (ART)
- CPA Base: Y 4643
- Area code: +54 388

Pairique Chico is a village in Jujuy Province, Argentina, in the Susques Department.

== Seismicity ==
The seismicity of the area of Jujuy is frequent and low intensity, and mean to severe seismic silence every 40 years.

- 1863 earthquake: This earthquake on January 4, 1863, measuring 6.4 on the Richter scale, indicated an important milestone in the history of seismic events in Jujuy. It highlighted the need to impose stricter construction codes.
- 1948 earthquake: The August 25, 1848, measuring 7.0 on the Richter scale, destroyed buildings and opened numerous cracks in wide areas.
- 2009 earthquake: November 6, 2009, measuring 5.6 on the Richter scale.
