= Antofalla, Catamarca =

Coordinates: 25°31′S 67°41′W

Antofalla (Catamarca)
- Municipality and village
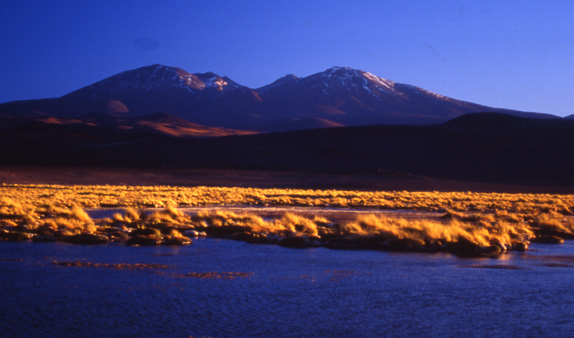
- Sunset in Antofalla village
- Interactive map of Antofalla (Catamarca)
- Country: Argentina
- Province: Catamarca Province
- Department: Antofagasta de la Sierra

Government
  - Mayor: Alejandro Evaristo Acevedo

Population (2001)
  - Total: 45
- Time zone: UTC−3 (ART)

Antofalla (Catamarca) is a village and municipality in Catamarca Province in northwestern Argentina.

== See also ==
- Alijilán
- Atacama people
