= Félix Galleguillos =

Chilean constituent

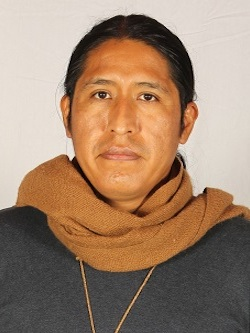

Member of the Constitutional Convention
- In office 4 July 2021 – 4 July 2022
- Constituency: Reserved Seat

Personal details
- Born: 23 March 1986 (age 40) Calama, Chile
- Education: Catholic University of the North (BA)
- Occupation: Constituent
- Profession: Civil engineer

Félix Galleguillos Aymani (born 23 March 1986) is a Chilean environmental civil engineer and Indigenous leader, a member of the Atacameño people, also known as the Lican Antay.

Between 2021 and 2022, he served as a member of the Chilean Constitutional Convention, elected through the system of Indigenous reserved seats representing the Atacameño people in the Antofagasta Region. Following his participation in the convention, he was appointed as Head of the local office of the National Corporation for Indigenous Development (CONADI) in San Pedro de Atacama.

During his time in the convention, he participated in several commissions related to environmental matters, rights of nature, and Indigenous peoples' rights, as well as bodies responsible for drafting transitional provisions of the constitutional process.

== Biography ==
Galleguillos was born on 23 March 1986 in the locality of Taira, in the commune of Calama. He is the son of Juan Raúl Galleguillos Galleguillos and Marta Aymani Aymani.

He completed his secondary education at the Liceo Habitacional América in the city of Calama in 2005. He later earned a degree in Environmental Civil Engineering from the Catholic University of the North.

In his professional career, he has provided advisory services to Indigenous communities on environmental issues.

== Public career ==
He is a member of the Atacameño community of Taira. He served as president of the Ayllu de Antofagasta student organization, was active as a student leader, and later became part of the board of his community. On 30 June 2021, he was invested as Lacksiri (head) to represent and act as spokesperson for his people nation.

In the 15–16 May 2021 election, he ran as a candidate for the Indigenous reserved seats representing the Atacameño people in the Antofagasta Region. He obtained 1,402 votes, corresponding to 20.70% of the valid votes cast, and entered the Constitutional Convention through the gender parity mechanism, replacing Ximena Anza.

During the drafting of the convention's internal regulations, he participated in the Ethics Committee. He later joined the thematic commissions on Environment, Rights of Nature, Common Natural Goods and Economic Model; and on Indigenous Peoples’ Rights and Plurinationality.

In May 2022, he became a member of the Transitional Provisions Committee, tasked with drafting rules for the potential implementation of the constitutional text, a process that did not proceed following the outcome of the 2022 Chilean constitutional plebiscite.
