= San Pedro de Atacama Airport =

San Pedro de Atacama Airport Aeropuerto de San Pedro de Atacama
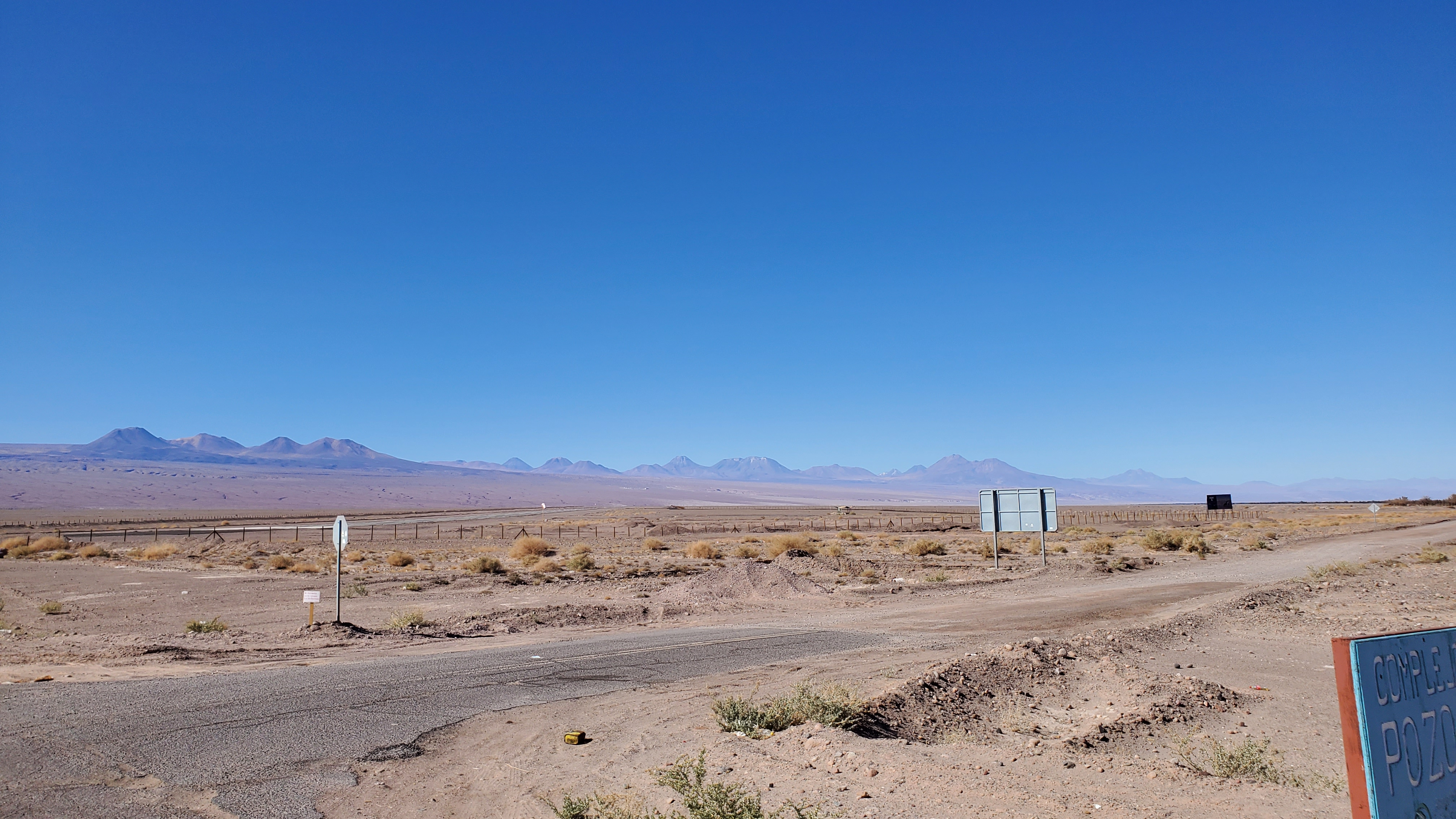
- The airport's runway, May 2022
- IATA: none; ICAO: SCPE

Summary
- Airport type: Public
- Serves: San Pedro de Atacama
- Elevation AMSL: 7,960 ft / 2,426 m
- Coordinates: 22°55′18″S 68°09′30″W

Map
- Location of San Pedro de Atacama Airport in Chile

Runways
Direction	Length		Surface
Direction	m	ft	Surface
14/32	1,995	6,545	Asphalt
- Source: Landings.com Google Maps GCM

San Pedro de Atacama Airport (Spanish: Aeropuerto de San Pedro de Atacama) (ICAO: SCPE) is a high elevation airport serving San Pedro de Atacama, a town in the Antofagasta Region of Chile. The airport is 3 kilometres (1.9 mi) east of the town.

== See also ==
- Transport in Chile
- List of airports in Chile
