= Andalhualá =

Coordinates: 26°52′S 66°02′W

- Municipality and village
- Interactive map of Andalhualá
- Country: Argentina
- Province: Catamarca Province
- Time zone: UTC−3 (ART)

Andalhualá is a village and municipality in Catamarca Province in northwestern Argentina.

== See also ==
- Atacama people
