= Church of San Pedro de Atacama =

Church in Antofagasta, Chile

Church of San Pedro de Atacama Iglesia San Pedro de Atacama (in Spanish)
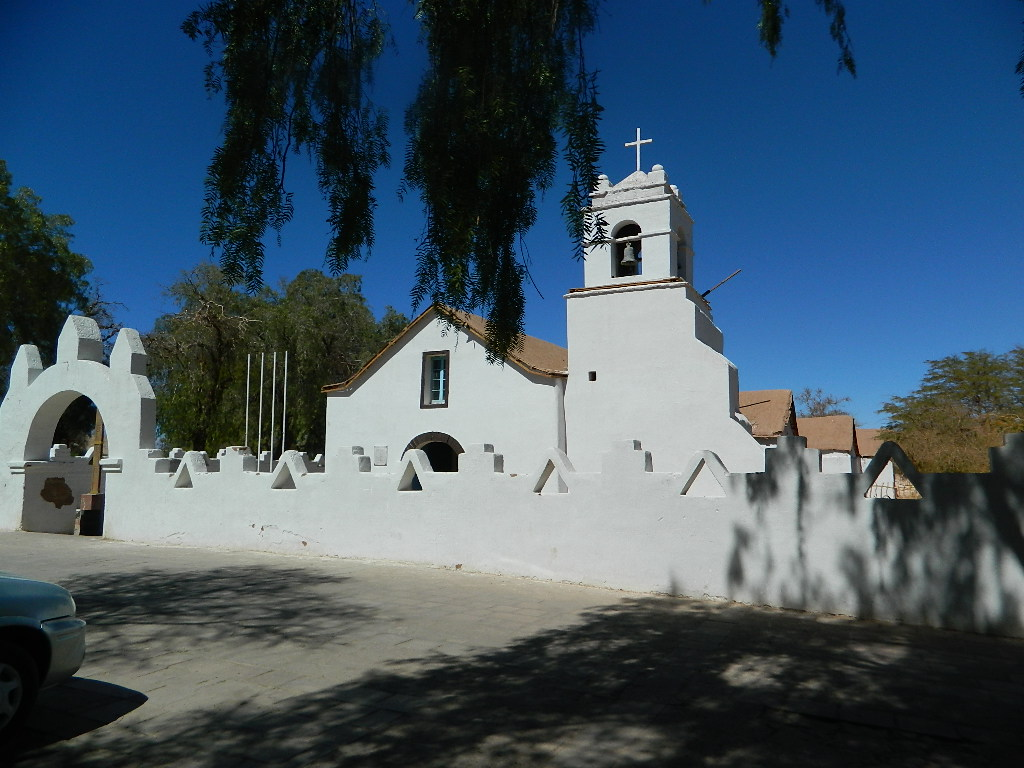
- Facade of Iglesia de San Pedro de Atacama

Religion
- Affiliation: Roman Catholic
- Ecclesiastical or organizational status: Church

Location
- Location: (Chile) San Pedro de Atacama; El Loa Province, Antofagasta Region
- Interactive map of Church of San Pedro de Atacama; Iglesia San Pedro de Atacama (in Spanish)
- Coordinates: 22°55′00″S 68°12′00″W

Architecture
- Completed: 17th century
- Materials: Mud and Cacti wood

The Church of San Pedro de Atacama (Iglesia San Pedro de Atacama) is a Catholic church in San Pedro de Atacama, Chile. Constructed during the Spanish colonial period, it is reportedly the second oldest church in Chile. Indigenous adobe material was used in the church's construction, whose appearance is characterized as simple and elegant. The church was built in the seventeenth century, underwent modifications in the eighteenth century, and additions were made in the nineteenth century. The church was declared a historical monument in 1951.

== Geography ==
The church is located in San Pedro de Atacama on the west side of the tree-lined Plaza de Armas, and near the town's oldest building, Casa Incaica, which dates to 1540. San Pedro, originally a locale of indigenous atacameños or Kunzas, now a bustling tourist centre, is 314 kilometres (195 mi) from Antofagasta.

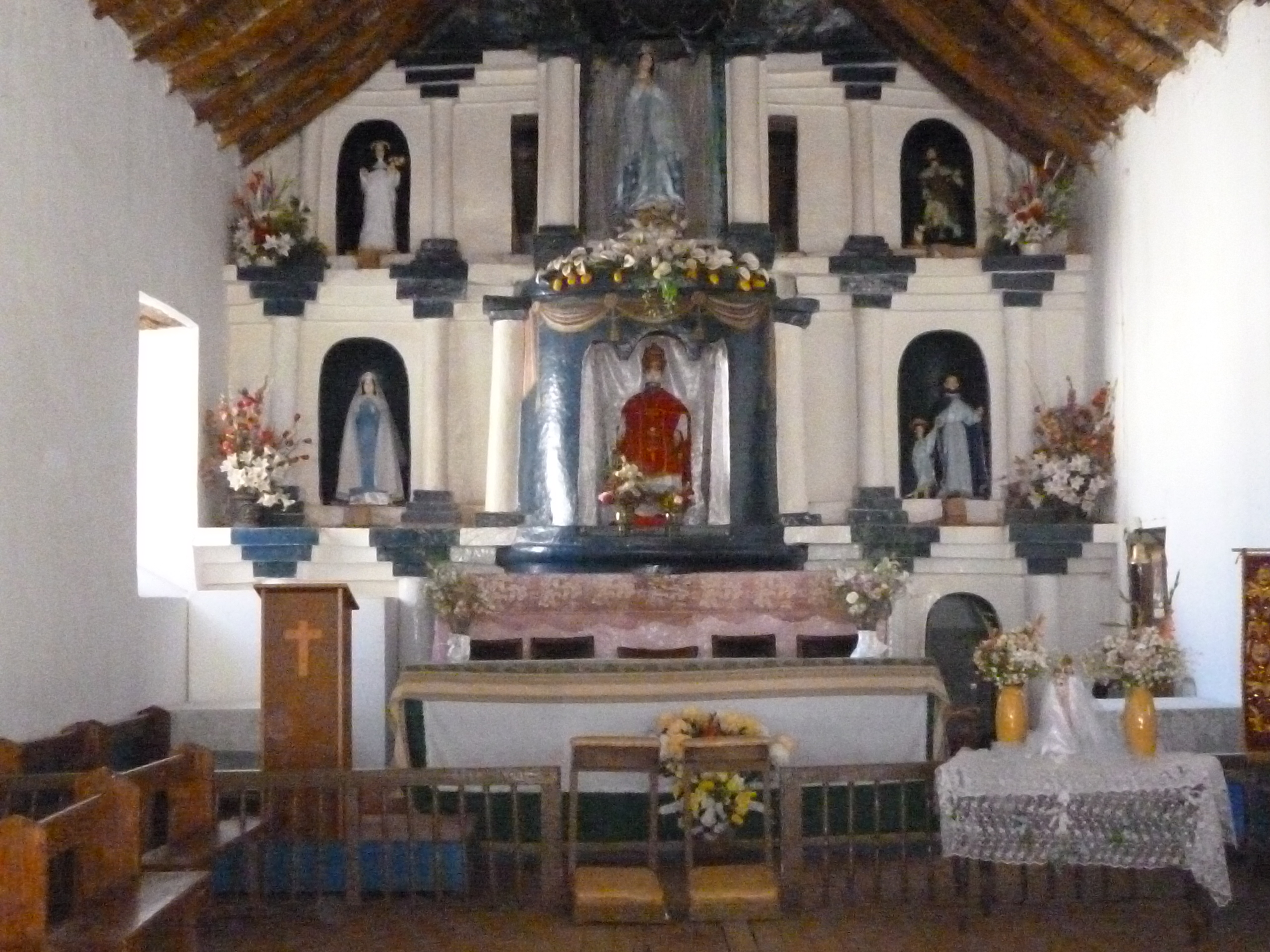
Interior view of Iglesia San Pedro de Atacama

== History ==
The town's original church was built more than 100 years earlier than the current church. The present church was built in the 17th century during the Spanish colonial rule. The patron saint is Peter. It has undergone many renovations; its present walls are dated to 1744. A tower was a 1964 addition, while other construction occurred in 1978. Restoration work on the 765 square metres (8,230 sq ft) structure occurred in 2009 under the auspices of the Department of Architecture, Antofagasta Region.

== Features ==
The church is constructed of adobe material; there are three doors, an arched stone lintel, and beamed ceiling. Both the interior and exterior are painted white, while the altar is of bright coloring. The walls, roof, and the entrance door are built with algarrobo wood and cardón (cactus wood), and bound together by llama leather, in the technique traditional to the altiplano. The roof is made of large rafters of algarrobo wood that are overlaid with slices of cactus logs. Algorrobo trees are seen along with the pepper trees next to the church. The altarpieces inside the church are carved and painted, and the statues here of Saint Mary and Saint Joseph contain a fluorescent lighting feature.
