= Anillaco, Catamarca =

Coordinates: 27.9919°S 67.5961°W

Anillaco (Catamarca)
- Municipality and village
- Interactive map of Anillaco (Catamarca)
- Country: Argentina
- Province: Catamarca Province
- Time zone: UTC−3 (ART)

Anillaco (Catamarca) is a village and municipality in Catamarca Province in northwestern Argentina.

== See also ==
- Atacama people
