= Battle of Río Grande =

1879 clash near San Pedro de Atacama, Bolivia

- Part of War of the Pacific
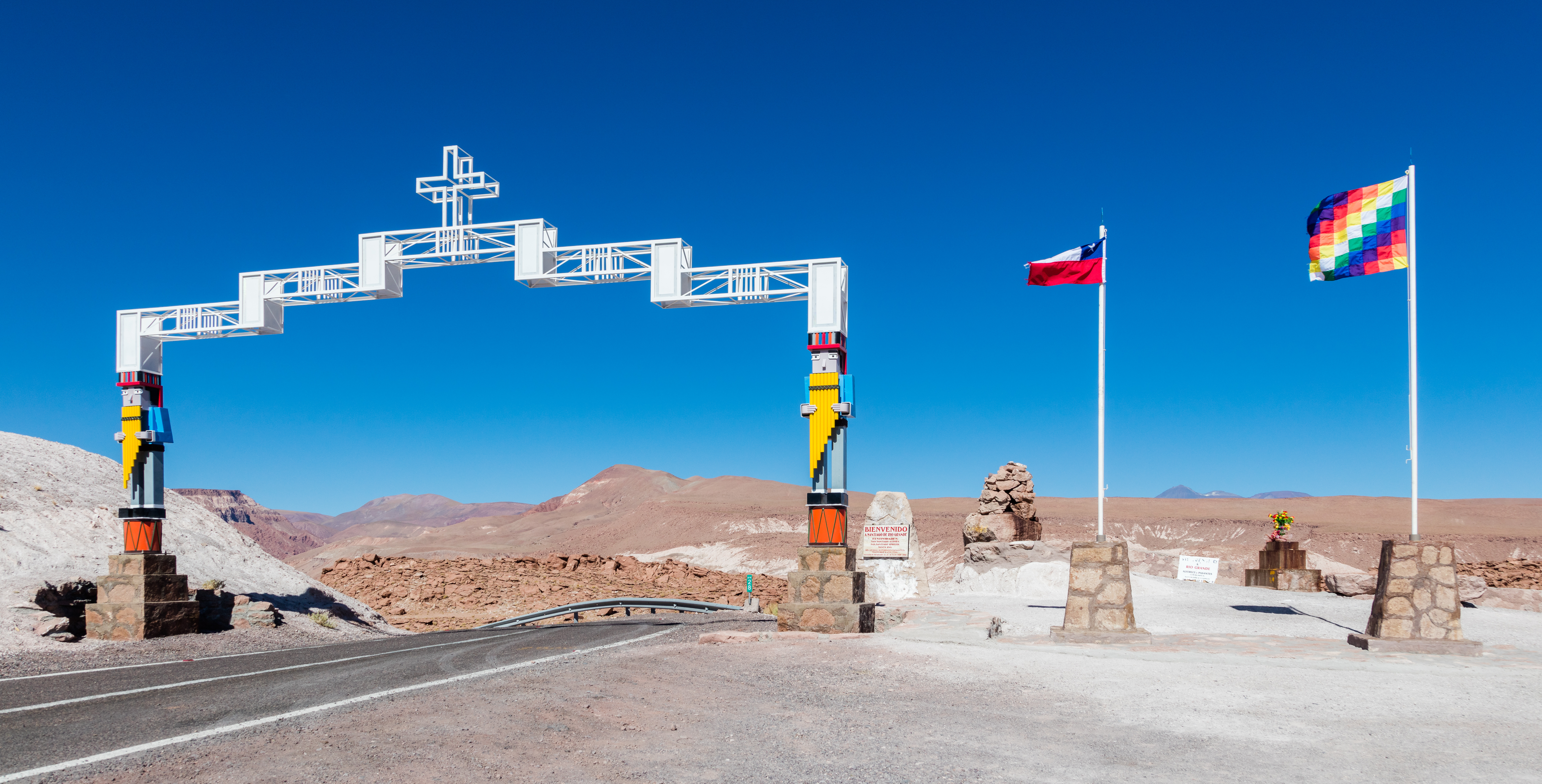
- Current gate to Río Grande, San Pedro de Atacama
Date	10 September 1879
Location	Defile of Río Grande, San Pedro de Atacama, Litoral Department, Bolivia (present-day Chile) 22°48′15″S 68°11′57″W
Result	Chilean victory

Belligerents
Chile	Bolivia

Commanders and leaders
(Chile) Ignacio Toro	(Bolivia) Toribio Gómez † (Bolivia) Jaime Ayo †

Strength
25 soldiers	40 irregulars

Casualties and losses
5 wounded	13 killed
- Location within Antofagasta Region Battle of Río Grande (Chile) Battle of Río Grande (South America)

The Battle of Río Grande was a minor military engagement that took place on 10 September 1879, during the War of the Pacific. A picket of Chilean soldiers and a Bolivian montonera clashed in Rio Grande, around San Pedro de Atacama. The Bolivians are defeated, which eliminates local resistance to Chilean occupation in the Litoral Department.

== Background ==
After the Chilean occupation of Calama, in March 1879, and other Bolivian villages in the Atacama Desert, by the military contingents, the so-called “Loa Line” was established; With the objective of preventing a Bolivian offensive from the Altiplano and controlling the Litoral Department. In the first months of war the Chilean government took into account the possibility of a Bolivian offensive, with the support of Peru, which in April would enter the war as an ally of Bolivia. In fact, in the Altiplano, a Military Division was being prepared for that purpose, under the command of General Narciso Campero.

Over time, the Chilean thought of a Bolivian or Peruvian offensive to the “Loa Line” was diluted, due to the harsh conditions to cross the Atacama Desert, so the territory lost relevance as a war front. But Chilean forces stationed in the area had to face the Bolivian locals, who were organized in montoneras to resist the occupation, hoping to see the Campero Division arrive.

== Battle ==
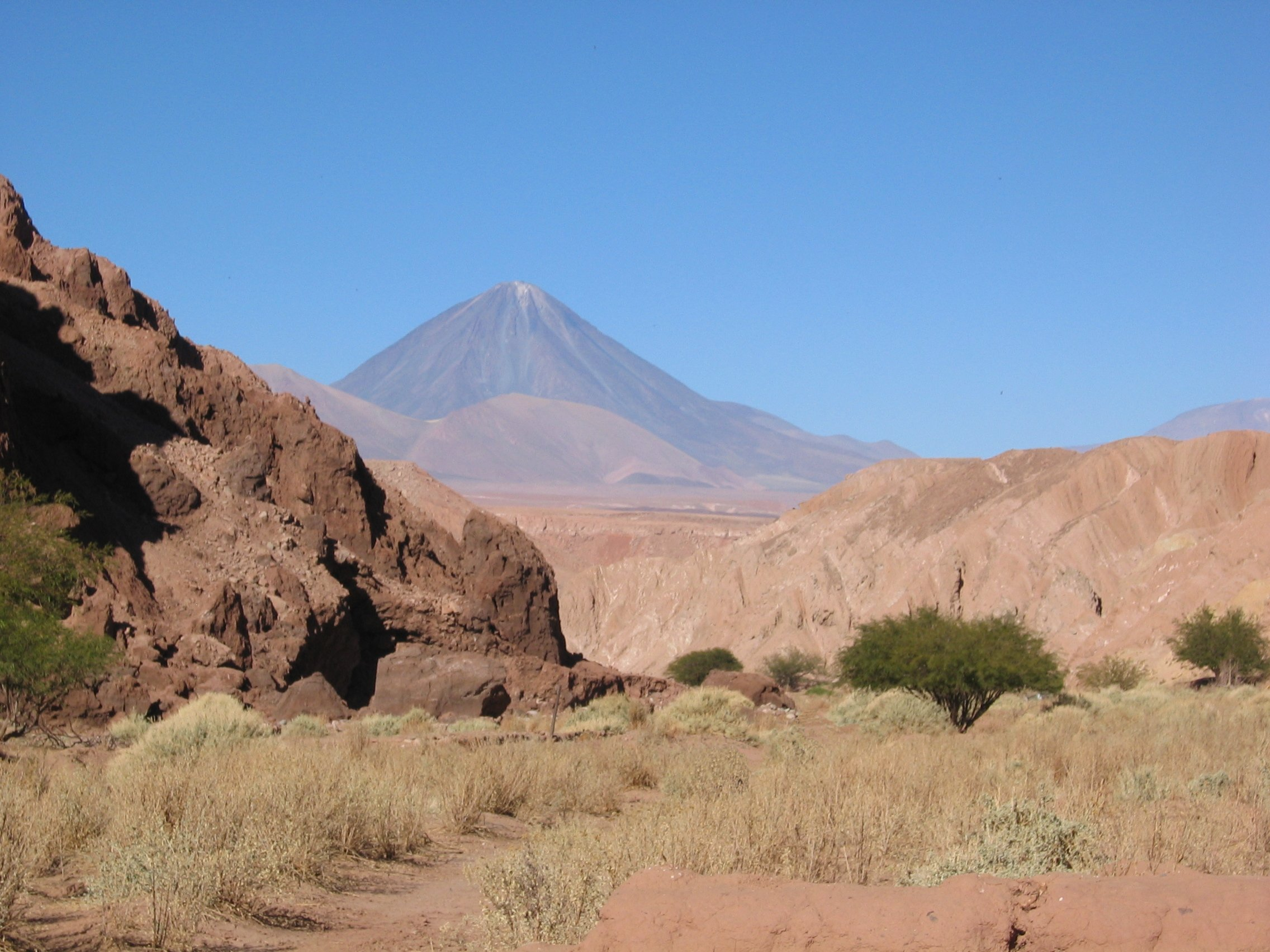
Geography of the battle area

Some Bolivians defeated in Calama dispersed through San Pedro de Atacama and then grouped with the locals, forming a montonera of forty men moderately armed with rifles. This Bolivian force was led by Toribio Gómez, from San Pedro de Atacama, and by the indigenous chief Jaime Ayo, from Río Grande.

On 6 September, in one of the raids of the Bolivian montonera, the Chilean arriero Francisco Vilches was taken prisoner by these near San Pedro de Atacama, but managed to escape by the pleas of a woman when they wanted to execute him. He immediately alerted the Chilean sub-delegate of San Pedro de Atacama, Ignacio Toro, of the presence of the Bolivians.

On 9 September, the Sub-delegate Toro, in the company of the Ensign José Miguel de los Ríos and a twenty-five men picket of the Regiment Mounted Hunters, departed from San Pedro de Atacama to persecute and defeat the montonera. At dawn the next day, Toro and his forces arrive at the entrance of a rough hillside in the gorge of Rio Grande, where Bolivians were hiding on top among huge rocks. When the Chileans advanced to the hillside, the Bolivians attacked them by surprise from their positions at the top, making concentrated shots and throwing large stones that slide from the top. The noise of the stones that fell from the top of the hillside scared the horses that the Chileans rode, causing several of them to be knocked down from the chair and others wounded by the falling stones. But the Chileans, encouraged by a brief harangue, advanced on foot against the Bolivians and defeated them in the defensive positions they occupied.

The Chileans had five wounded in battle, one of them seriously. For their part, the Bolivians had thirteen dead in the fight, including their bosses Gómez and Ayo, and the rest dispersed. After the battle, the Sub-delegate Toro returned with his forces to San Pedro de Atacama, bringing with him a booty of 200 lambs, 160 goats and 20 donkeys.

== Aftermath ==
This was the first engagement in the “Loa Line” that had a bit of importance, after Calama. The small Chilean military contingents in the area had managed to paralyze any Bolivian attack. The Bolivian inhabitants of Atacama were completely demoralized, and some submitted to Chilean authority and others fled into Bolivia.

Since November, the war focused on the Tarapacá region, while between the "Loa Line" and the Altiplano there were only minor incidents between the outposts of both sides. The Campero division was never able to carry out the offensive against Chileans in the Loa, due to logistical limitations and also to the geographical conditions in the area.

== Sources ==
- Vicuña Mackenna, Benjamín (1880). Historia de la campaña de Tarapacá: Desde la ocupación de Antofagasta hasta la proclamación de la dictadura en el Perú (in Spanish). Vol. II. Santiago, Chile: Imprenta Cervantes.
- Barros, Alonso (2008). "Identidades y propiedades: Transiciones territoriales en el siglo XIX atacameño" (PDF). Estudios Atacameños: Arqueología y antropología surandinas (in Spanish) (35). Antofagasta, Chile: 119–139.
