= Alijilán =

Coordinates: 28°09′S 65°29′W

- Municipality and village
- Interactive map of Alijilán
- Country: Argentina
- Province: Catamarca Province
- Time zone: UTC−3 (ART)

Alijilán is a village and municipality in Catamarca Province in northwestern Argentina.

== See also ==
- Antofalla, Catamarca
- Atacama people
