= Anquincila =

Coordinates: 28°46′S 65°33′W

- Municipality and village
- Interactive map of Anquincila
- Country: Argentina
- Province: Catamarca Province
- Time zone: UTC−3 (ART)

Anquincila is a village and municipality in Catamarca Province in northwestern Argentina.

== See also ==
- Atacama people
