= Ximena Anza =

Chilean politician

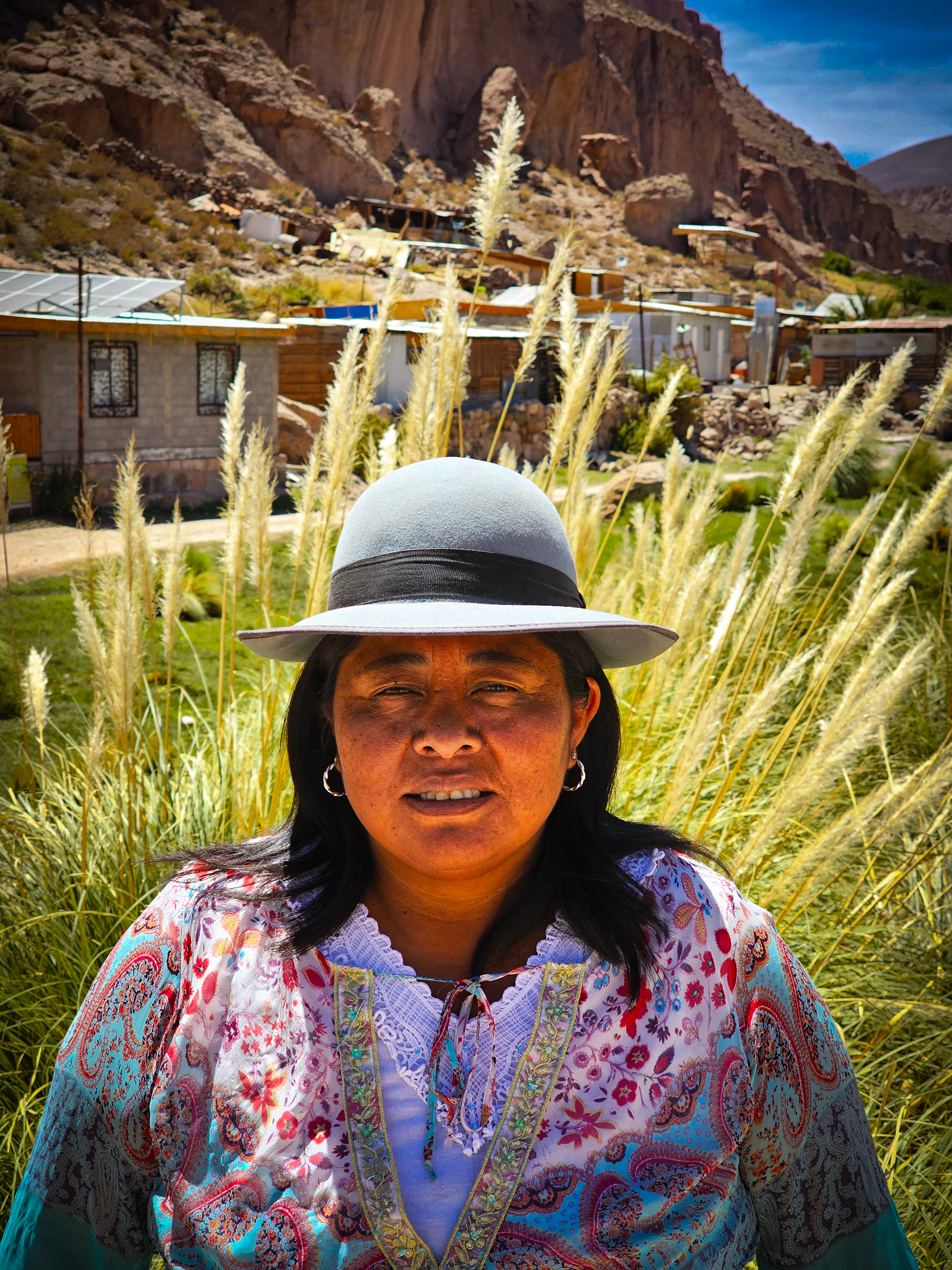

Personal details
- Born: Ximena Anza Colamar
- Occupation: Community activist

Ximena Anza Colamar is a Chilean activist of Atacameño (or Likanantaí) descent.

In 2021, she failed to get elected to serve as the representative of the Atacameño people for a reserved seat in the Constitutional Convention.

== Biography ==
Prior to her election to the Constitutional Convention, Anza was heavily involved in activism in her hometown of Caspana, Antofagasta, including service as Secretary of the Atacama Community in the region. As an activist, she worked with the provincial government of El Loa as well as the municipal government of Calama to coordinate sustainable regional development plans inclusive of Antofagasta's indigenous communities.

On environmental policy, Anza has expressed concern that unsustainable tourism poses a threat to the environment of Caspana. She has proposed a new model of tourism, which would "be led by people from our own community, protecting the environment and with a basis that allows us to organize the territory under a respectful gaze".

Anza was elected to represent the Atacameño people in the 2021 Chilean Constitutional Convention election, receiving 954 votes in her favor. Nevertheless, she was replaced by Félix Galleguillos due to the gender parity of the Chilean political system.
