= Loro Huasi =

Coordinates: 26°45′17″S 66°03′19″W

- Municipality and town
- Interactive map of Loro Huasi
- Country: Argentina
- Province: Catamarca Province
- Time zone: UTC−3 (ART)

Loro Huasi is a town and municipality in Catamarca Province, in northwestern Argentina.
