= Olaroz Chico =

Coordinates: 23°28′S 66°49′W

- Rural municipality and village
- Interactive map of Olaroz Chico
- Country: Argentina
- Province: Jujuy Province
- Time zone: UTC−3 (ART)

Olaroz Chico is a rural municipality and village in Jujuy Province in Argentina.
