= Valle de la Luna (Chile) =

Valley in the Atacama desert

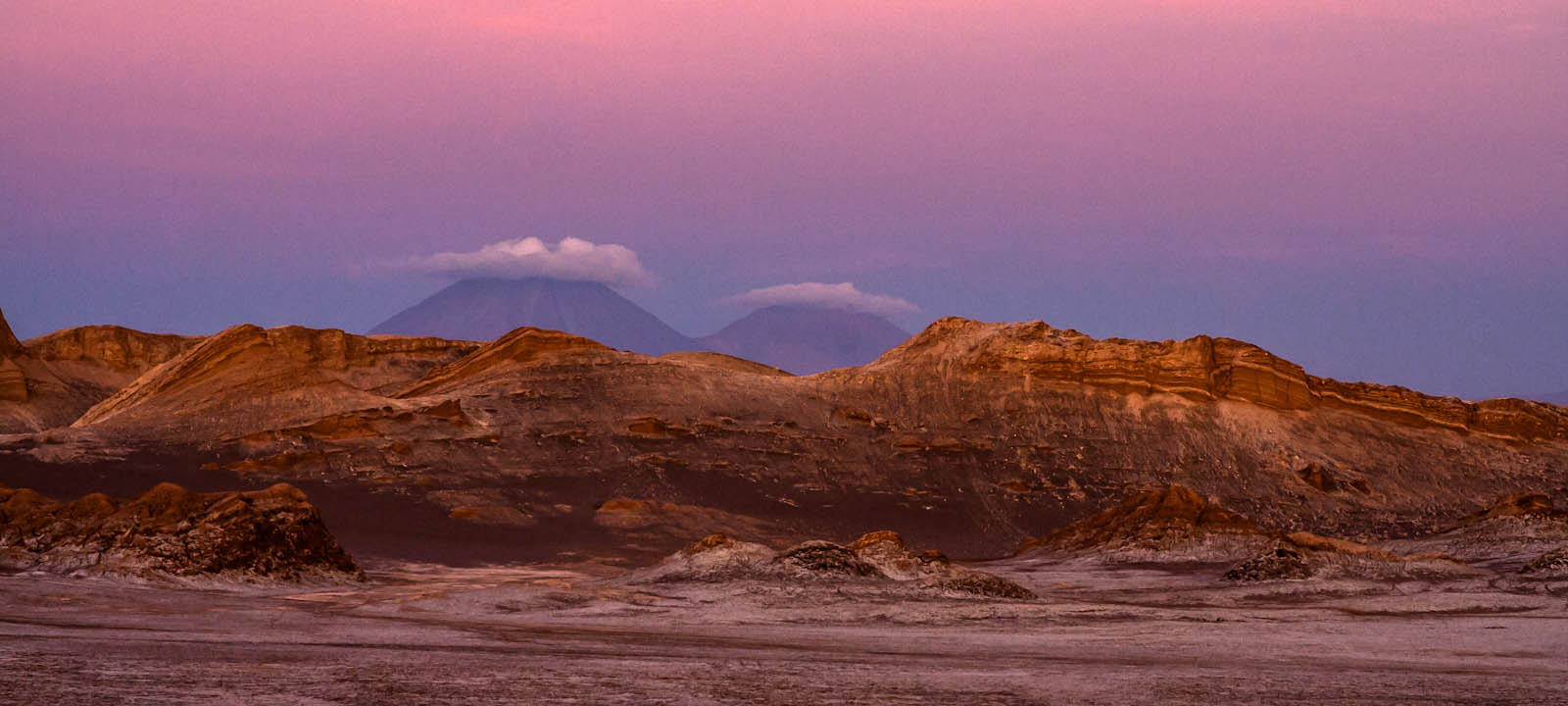
- Valle de la Luna

- Location within Chile

Geography
- Location: San Pedro de Atacama, El Loa, Chile
- Coordinates: 22.9112°S 68.32303°W
- Interactive map of Valle de la Luna

Valle de la Luna (Valley of the Moon) is located 13 kilometres (8 mi) west of San Pedro de Atacama, in the north of Chile in the Cordillera de la Sal, in the Atacama Desert.

It has various stone and sand formations which have been carved by wind and water. It has an impressive range of color and texture, looking somewhat similar to the surface of the Moon. There are also dry lakes where the composition of salt makes a white covering layer of the area. It presents diverse saline outcrops which appear like man-made sculptures. There are also a great variety of caverns. When the sun sinks it defines the landscape while the wind blows among the rocks and the sky passes from pink color to purple and finally black.

Valle de la Luna is a part of the Reserva Nacional los Flamencos and was declared a Nature Sanctuary in 1982 for its natural environment and strange lunar landscape, from which its name is derived. The Atacama Desert is also considered one of the driest places on earth, as some areas have not received a single drop of rain in hundreds of years. A prototype for a Mars rover was tested there by scientists because of the valley's dry and forbidding terrain.

== Gallery ==
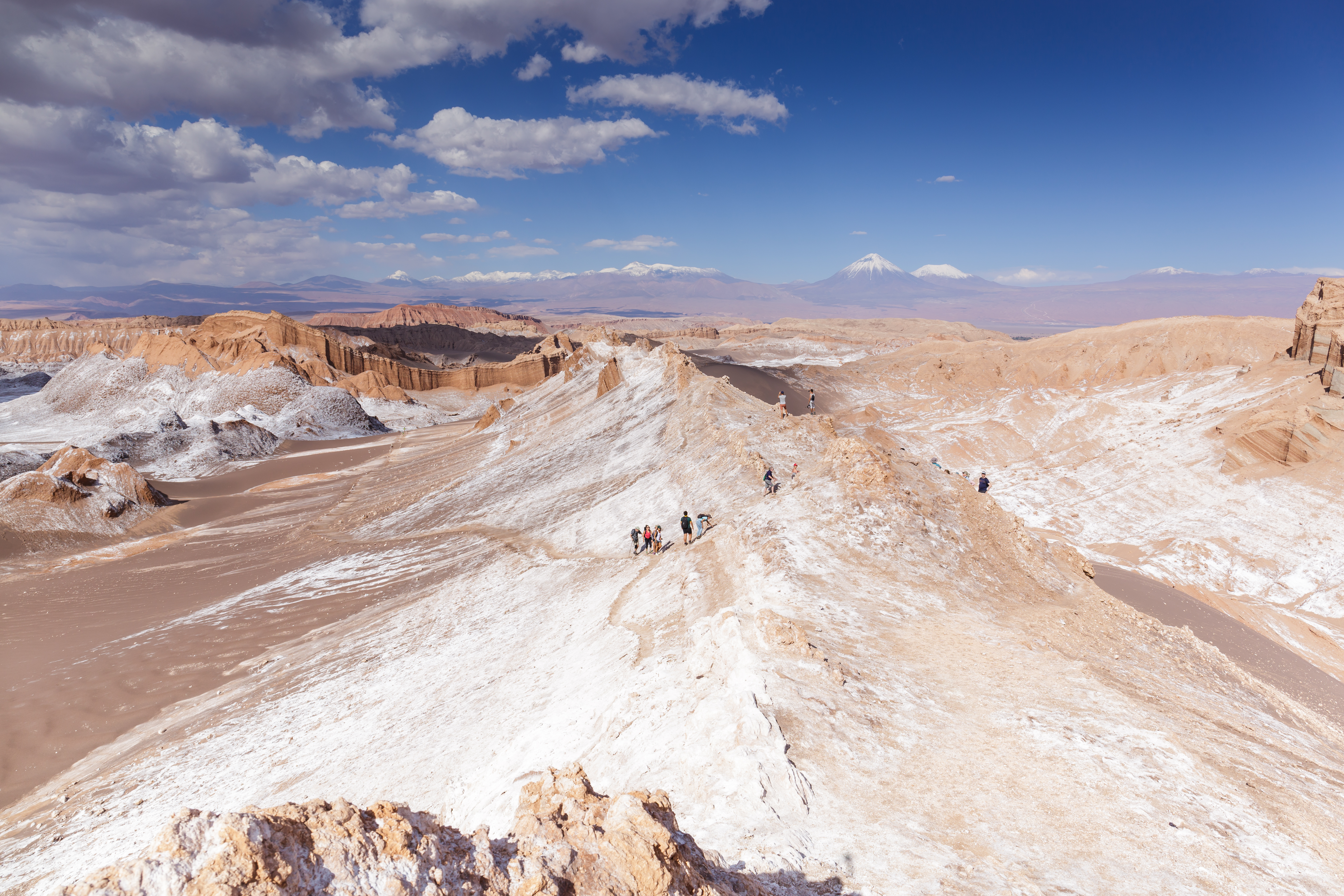
El Valle de la Luna (Valley of the Moon)

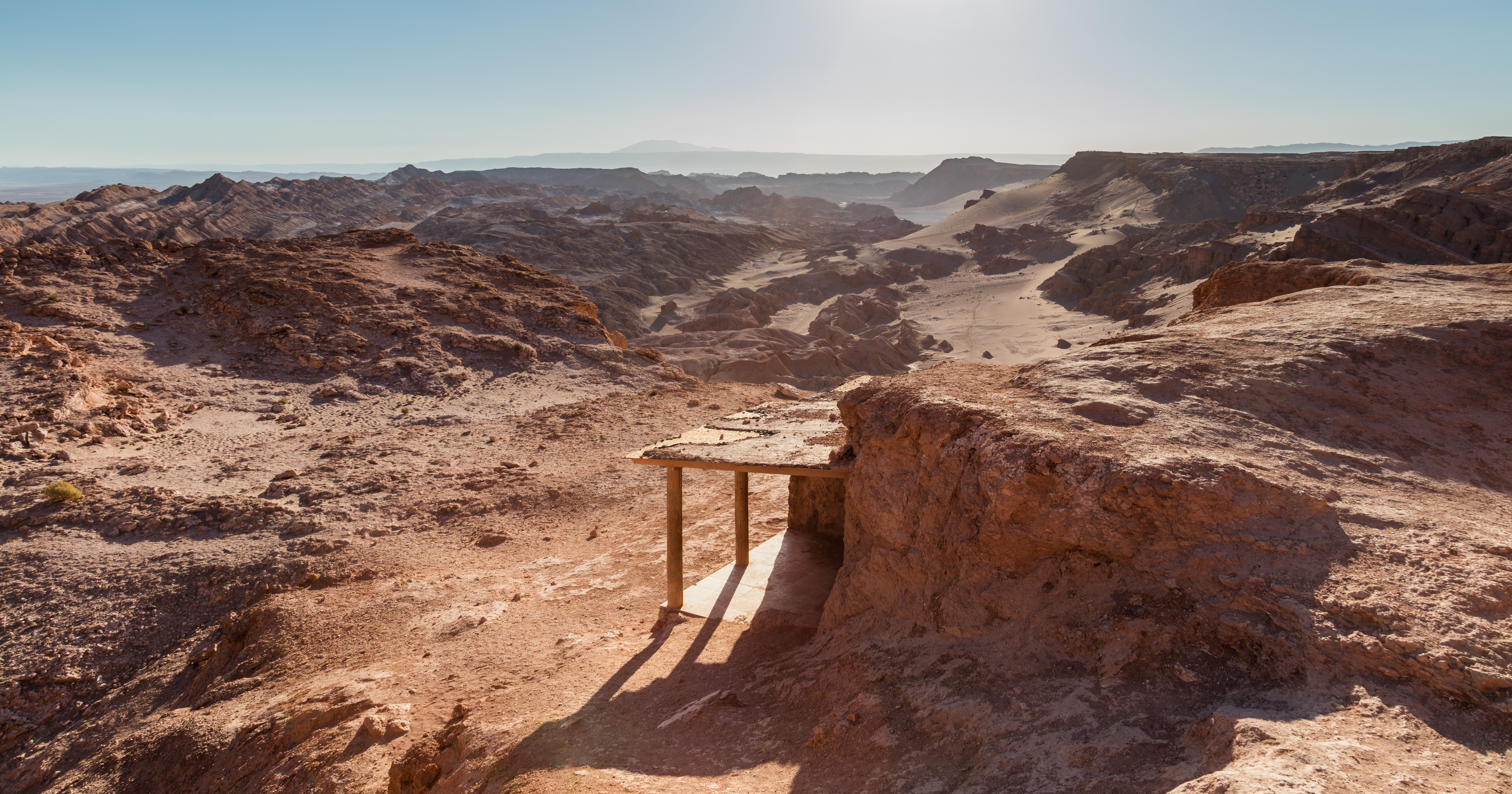
Valle de la Luna, Salt mountain range.

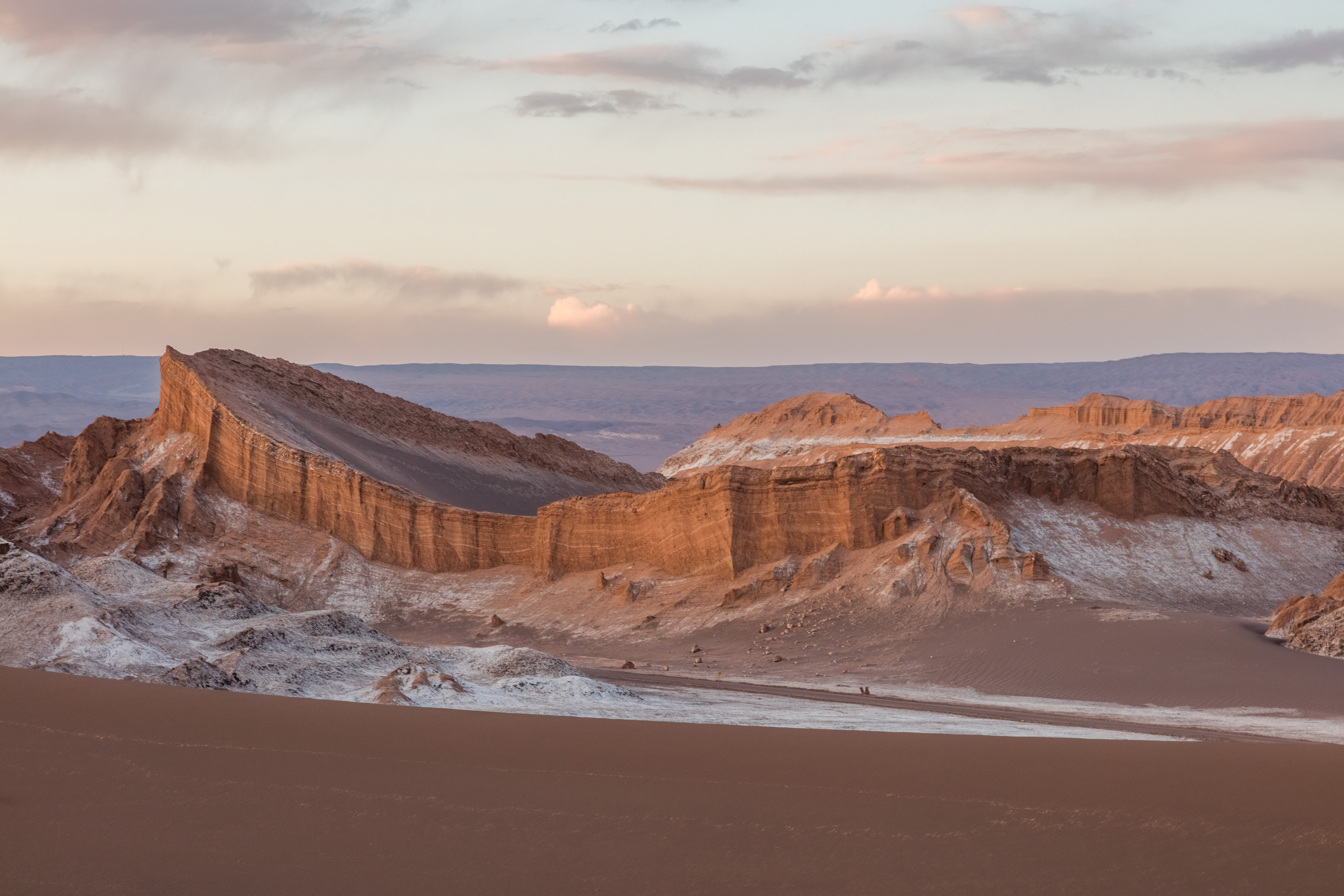
The Amphitheater.

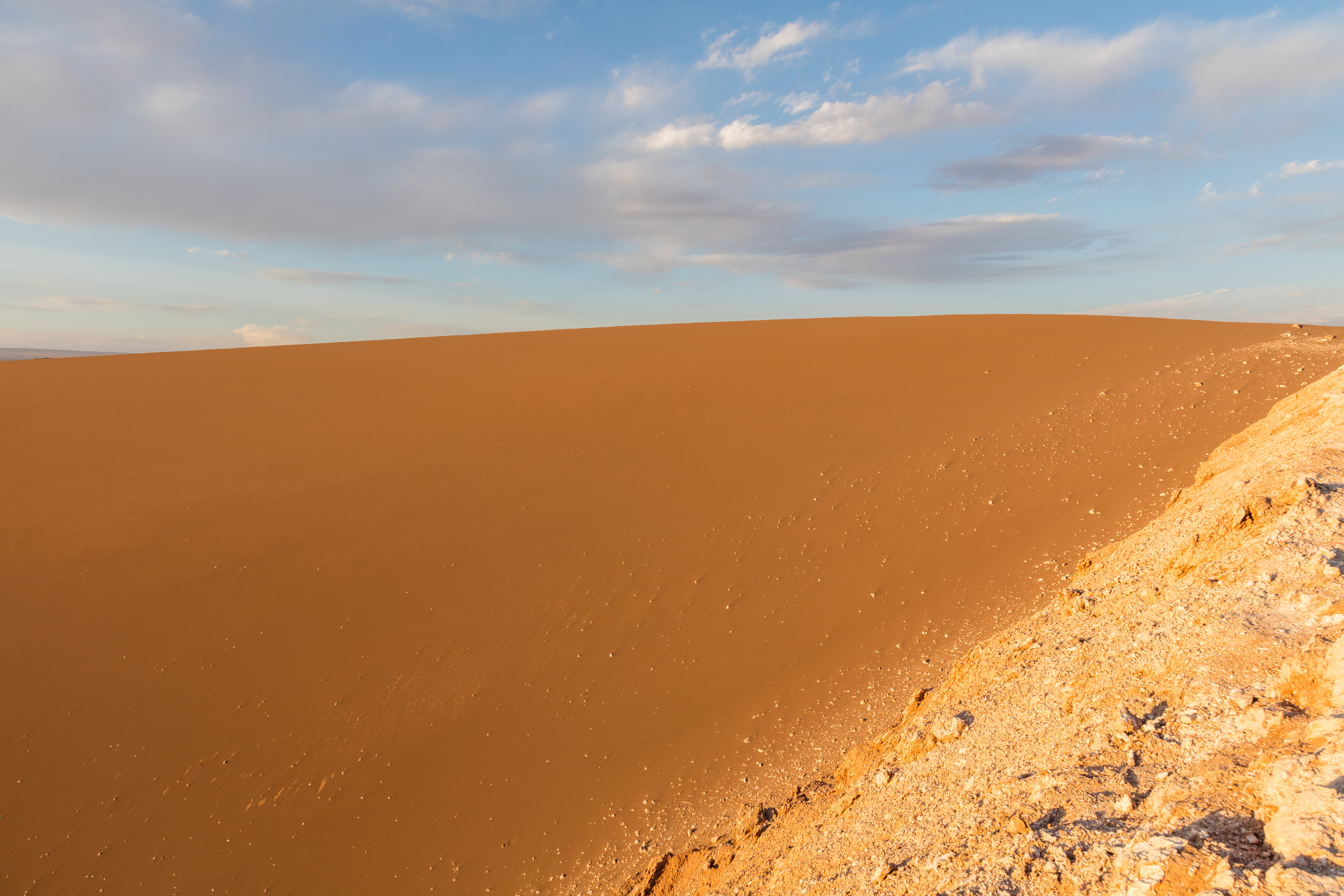
Big Dune.

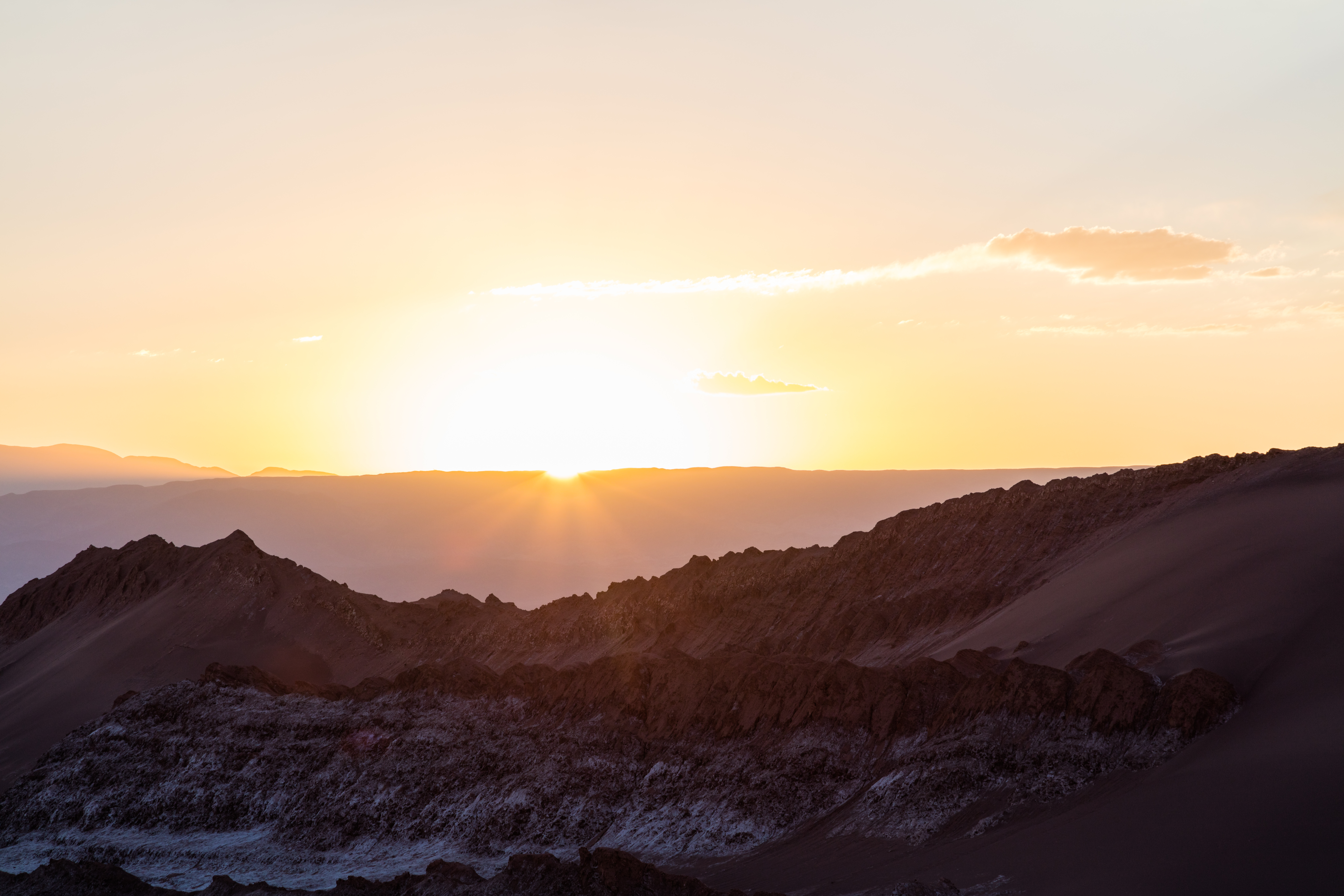
Sunset

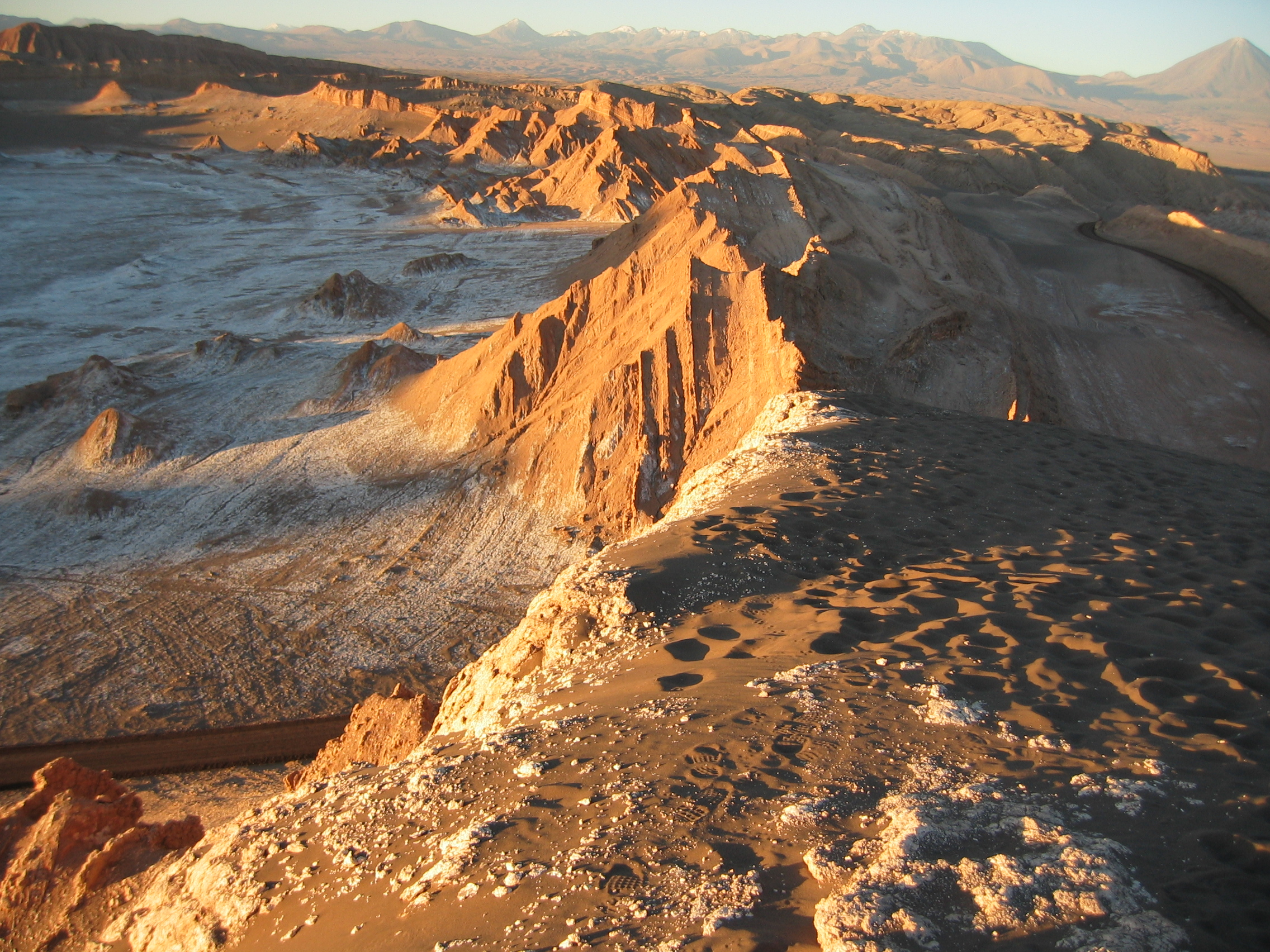
A landscape resembling a lunar crater
