= San Juan de Quillaques =

Coordinates: 23°13′50″S 66°20′36″W

- Rural municipality and village
- Interactive map of San Juan de Quillaques
- Country: Argentina
- Province: Jujuy Province
- Time zone: UTC−3 (ART)

San Juan de Quillaques is a rural municipality and village in Jujuy Province in Argentina.
