= Susques =

- Rural municipality and village
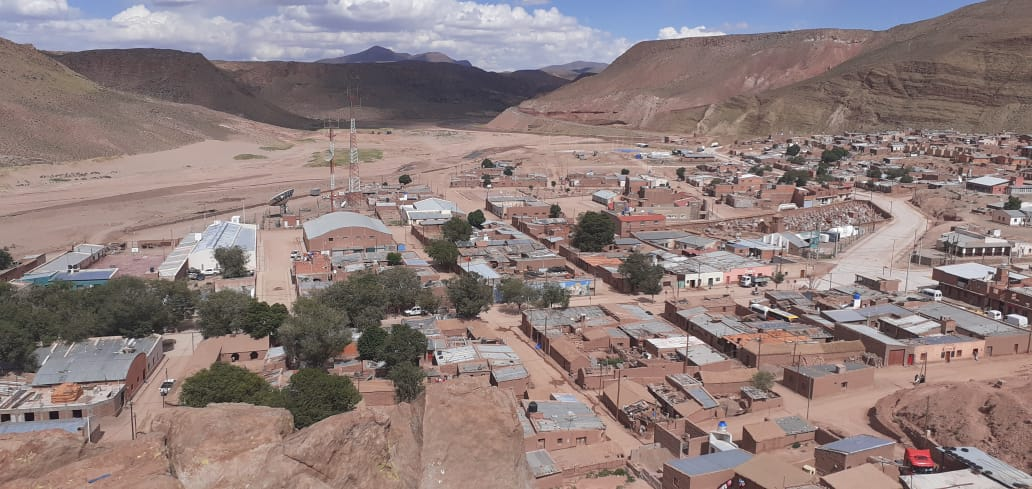

- Location in Argentina
- Coordinates: 23°24′02″S 66°22′02″W
- Country: Argentina
- Province: Jujuy Province
- Elevation: 12,782 ft (3,896 m)

Population (2001)
  - Total: 1,140
- Time zone: UTC−3 (ART)

Susques is a rural municipality and village in Jujuy Province in Argentina.

== Geography ==
=== Climate ===
Susques has a cool arid climate (Köppen BWk) with two seasons: a mild summer with occasional thunderstorms from December to March and a cold, rainless winter covering the remaining eight months of the year.

Climate data for Susques (1972-1996)
Month	Jan	Feb	Mar	Apr	May	Jun	Jul	Aug	Sep	Oct	Nov	Dec	Year
Daily mean °C (°F)	11.3 (52.3)	11.2 (52.2)	10.5 (50.9)	8.1 (46.6)	4.9 (40.8)	3.0 (37.4)	2.5 (36.5)	4.6 (40.3)	6.6 (43.9)	8.9 (48.0)	10.4 (50.7)	11.1 (52.0)	7.8 (46.0)
Average precipitation mm (inches)	72 (2.8)	51 (2.0)	22 (0.9)	1 (0.0)	1 (0.0)	0 (0)	0 (0)	0 (0)	0 (0)	1 (0.0)	8 (0.3)	32 (1.3)	188 (7.4)
Source: Instituto Nacional de Tecnología Agropecuaria
