= Huáncar =

Coordinates: 23°33′47″S 66°24′36″W

- Rural municipality and village
- Interactive map of Huáncar
- Country: Argentina
- Province: Jujuy Province
- Time zone: UTC−3 (ART)

Huáncar is a rural municipality and village in the Jujuy Province of Argentina.
