= Catua =

Coordinates: 23°52′S 67°01′W

- Rural municipality and village
- Interactive map of Catua
- Country: Argentina
- Province: Jujuy Province
- Time zone: UTC−3 (ART)

Catua is a rural municipality and village in Jujuy Province in Argentina.
