= Puesto Sey =

Coordinates: 23°55′S 66°34′W

- Rural municipality and village
- Interactive map of Puesto Sey
- Country: Argentina
- Province: Jujuy Province
- Time zone: UTC−3 (ART)

Puesto Sey is a rural municipality and village in Jujuy Province in Argentina.
