= Tocopilla Museum =

Archaeological museum in Tocopilla, Chile

Tocopilla Museum (Spanish: Museo de Tocopilla) is a municipal archaeology museum in the Chilean city of Tocopilla located in the coast of Atacama Desert. Among its collections are chisels and hatchets but despite being in a zone of colonial and Pre-Hispanic metallurgy there are no metal species from the city or its surroundings in the collection.
