= Pastos Chicos =

Coordinates: 23°02′07″S 67°21′00″W

- Rural municipality and village
- Interactive map of Pastos Chicos
- Country: Argentina
- Province: Jujuy Province
- Time zone: UTC−3 (ART)

Pastos Chicos is a rural municipality and village in Jujuy Province in Argentina.
