= San Pedro de Atacama =

Town and commune in Antofagasta, Chile

- Town and commune
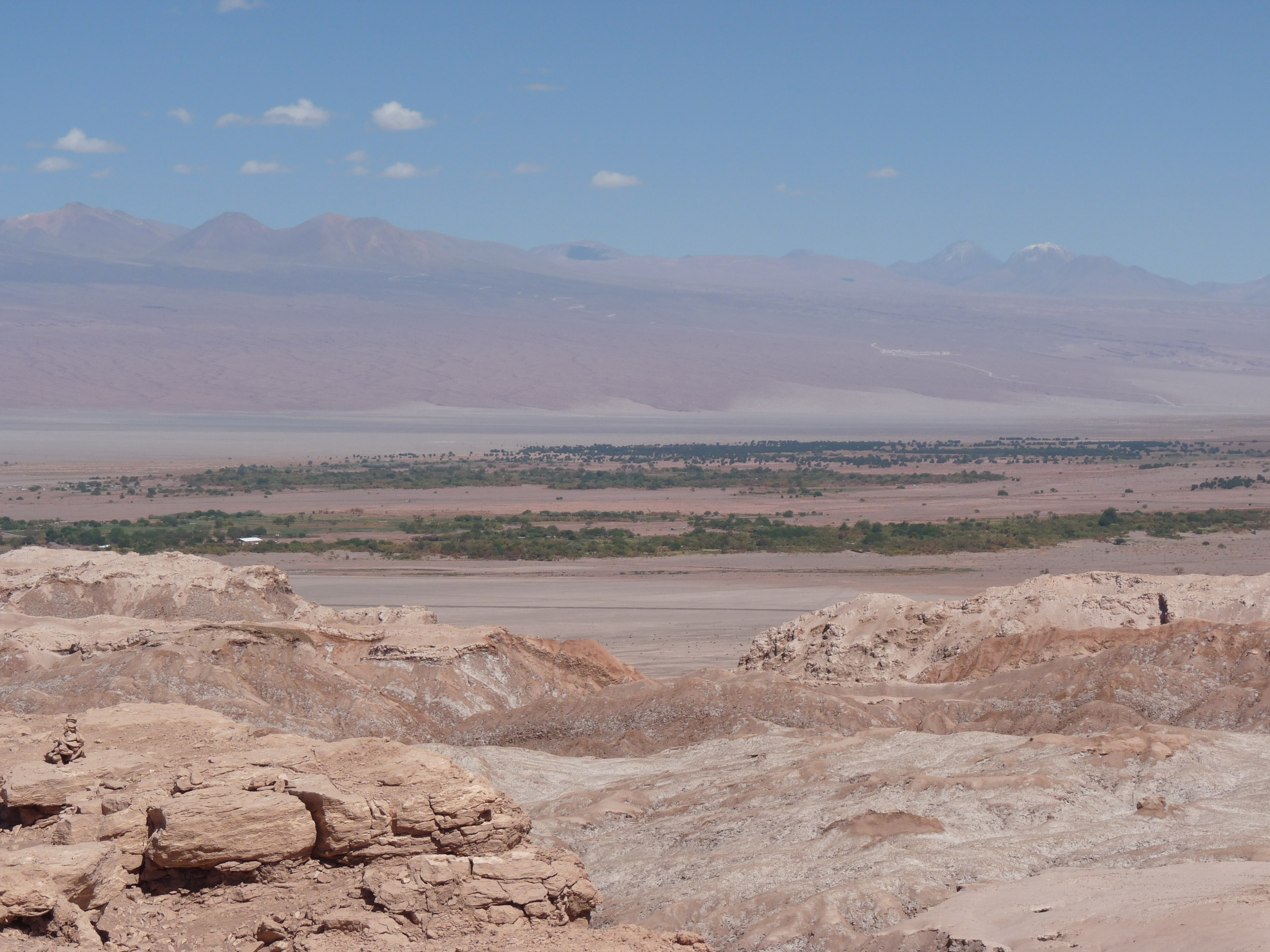
- San Pedro de Atacama at the edge of the Salar de Atacama

- Coat of arms Map of San Pedro de Atacama commune in Antofagasta Region Location in Chile
- Coordinates: 22°55′S 68°12′W
- Country: Chile
- Region: Antofagasta
- Province: El Loa
- Founded: ≈1450

Government
  - Type: Municipality
  - Mayor: Justo Zuleta (Ind./FRVS)

Area
  - Total: 23,438.8 km^{2} (9,049.8 sq mi)
- Elevation: 2,407 m (7,897 ft)

Population (2012 Census)
  - Total: 10,960
  - Density: 0.4676/km^{2} (1.211/sq mi)
  - Urban: 1,938
  - Rural: 3,031

Gender
  - Male: 2,928
  - Female: 2,041
- Time zone: UTC-3 (CLST)
- Area code: (+56) 5
- Website: Municipalidad San Pedro de Atacama

San Pedro de Atacama is a Chilean town and commune in El Loa Province, Antofagasta Region. It is located east of Antofagasta, some 106 km (60 mi) southeast of Calama and the Chuquicamata copper mine, overlooking the Licancabur volcano. It features a significant archeological museum, the R. P. Gustavo Le Paige Archaeological Museum, with a large collection of relics and artifacts from the region. Native ruins nearby attract increasing numbers of tourists interested in learning about pre-Columbian cultures.

== History ==
San Pedro de Atacama grew, over centuries, around an oasis in the Puna de Atacama, an arid high plateau. Its first inhabitants were the Atacameños, who developed basketworks and ceramic pottery crafts that can be now be appreciated by tourists in the several souvenir shops as typical products of San Pedro de Atacama. There is debate over what degree of connection the Atacameños had to the Tiwanaku culture.

It was part of Bolivia since independence from Spain until Chile claimed ownership during the War of the Pacific. During that war, the Battle of Río Grande was fought in the surroundings. With the creation of Atacama Province in 1829 San Pedro de Atacama lost its traditional status as regional capital to the port Cobija. As the government of Andrés de Santa Cruz sought to link the port of Cobija to the rest of Bolivia it promoted the cultivation of alfalfa in San Pedro to provide forage for travellers between the Altiplano and the coast.

On July 18, 2024, the region suffered a 7.4 magnitude earthquake.

== Demographics ==
According to the 2002 census of the National Statistics Institute, San Pedro de Atacama had 4,969 inhabitants (2,928 males and 2,041 females). Of these, 1,938 (39%) lived in urban areas and 3,031 (61%) in rural areas. The population grew by 75.6% (2,140 persons) between the 1992 and 2002 censuses.

== Administration ==
As a commune, San Pedro de Atacama is a third-level administrative division of Chile administered by a municipal council, headed by a mayor who is directly elected every four years. Since 2021, the mayor has been Justo Zuleta (Ind./FRVS). The 2024–2028 councillors are the following:

- Williams Puca (Ind./DC)
- Iván Bautista (Ind./FRVS)
- Sergio Huaiquiñir (Ind./FRVS)
- Vilma Catur (Ind./RN)
- Carolina Soto (Ind.)
- Carolina Colamar (Ind.)

Within the electoral divisions of Chile, San Pedro de Atacama is represented in the Chamber of Deputies by Marcos Espinosa (PRSD) and Felipe Ward (UDI) as part of the third electoral district, (together with Tocopilla, María Elena, Calama and Ollagüe). The commune is represented in the Senate by Alejandro Guillier Álvarez (PRSD) and Pedro Araya Guerrero (Ind.) as part of the second senatorial constituency (Antofagasta Region).

== Climate ==
The town lies at an average of 8,000 feet (2,400 m), thus visitors often experience mild altitude sickness such as dizziness, lethargy and headaches. The local climate is extremely dry and mild, with daytime temperatures between 25–30 degrees Celsius (77–86 degrees Fahrenheit) in the summer (December to February) and 18–25 °C (64–77 °F) in the winter (June to August). Nighttime temperatures routinely drop below 0 °C (32 °F) and can reach as low as −10 °C (14 °F) in the winter. The record high temperature of 38.3 °C (100.9 °F) was registered in January 2024 in San Pedro de Atacama.

Köppen-Geiger climate classification system classifies its climate as cold desert (BWk) for an isotherm of the mean yearly temperature of lower than 18 °C (64 °F).

Climate data for San Pedro de Atacama
Month	Jan	Feb	Mar	Apr	May	Jun	Jul	Aug	Sep	Oct	Nov	Dec	Year
Mean daily maximum °C (°F)	28.0 (82.4)	28.0 (82.4)	27.0 (80.6)	25.0 (77.0)	21.8 (71.2)	18.9 (66.0)	19.3 (66.7)	21.5 (70.7)	23.4 (74.1)	25.7 (78.3)	27.3 (81.1)	28.0 (82.4)	24.5 (76.1)
Mean daily minimum °C (°F)	8.8 (47.8)	9.4 (48.9)	7.9 (46.2)	5.1 (41.2)	1.9 (35.4)	−0.5 (31.1)	−0.8 (30.6)	0.9 (33.6)	2.7 (36.9)	4.4 (39.9)	5.8 (42.4)	7.3 (45.1)	4.4 (39.9)
Average precipitation mm (inches)	4 (0.2)	21 (0.8)	7 (0.3)	0 (0)	1 (0.0)	2 (0.1)	0 (0)	1 (0.0)	1 (0.0)	0 (0)	1 (0.0)	0 (0)	38 (1.5)
Average relative humidity (%)	28	38	31	23	22	20	18	14	13	13	17	22	22
Source: Atlas Agroclimatico de Chile (temperatures 1958–1989, precipitation 1960–2015, humidity 2011–2015)

== Transportation ==
San Pedro lies on the main paved road from Argentina over the Paso de Jama, 160 km from the town. The road is paved throughout. There are frequent bus services to Calama, several buses daily to Santiago and buses on 6 days a week to Salta across the Andes in Argentina. Nearby airports are San Pedro de Atacama Airport and Salar de Atacama Airport for private aircraft, and the larger El Loa Airport/Calama 100 km away for scheduled aircraft.

== Tourism ==
San Pedro de Atacama is a popular tourist destination. There are various activities for adventurers in the San Pedro de Atacama area: trekking, climbing, archaeological sightings, amateur astronomy, exploration tours in natural landscapes and even sand boarding in the desert. Because of its altitude, a brief period of acclimatization may be required.

=== Sights in town ===
In the town are some cultural and scientific sites:

- R. P. Gustavo Le Paige Archaeological Museum, displaying ceramics and pottery crafts from the first inhabitants of the area.
- Church of San Pedro de Atacama a National Monument, built with adobe, a building material used in the colonial times.
- Meteorite Museum displays and explains meteorites of various compositions, from various celestial sources, some of which an international collaboration has gathered in the large, infrequently disturbed collection area of the Atacama.

=== Outlying sights ===
- Chaxas Lagoon, part of Los Flamencos National Reserve in the Salar de Atacama, inhabited by pink flamingos.
- El Tatio, a geyser field with over 80 active geysers.
- Llano de Chajnantor Observatory, a radio-telescope site, home of "ALMA", the Atacama Large Millimeter Array.
- Laguna Miscanti (Miscanti Lagoon) and Laguna Miñiques (Miñiques Lagoon), two neighboring altiplanic lagoons at the altitude of 4,200 m (13,500 ft).
- Licancabur, a notable volcano near San Pedro de Atacama.
- Pukará de Quitor (Fort Quitor). A fortification built by the Atacameño people in the 12th century.
- Puritama Hot Springs
- Salar de Atacama, a giant salt flat (3,000 km^{2} / 1,864.11 mi^{2}) in the middle of the desert.
- Valle de la Luna ("Valley of the Moon"), a moon-like landscape with ruins of old Chilean salt mines, and worker huts.
- Valle de la Muerte (Death Valley): a valley where gigantic dunes and rocks abound.

=== Holidays and festivals in San Pedro de Atacama ===
The festivals includes typical dances, masses in the street and a little parade through the main street of San Pedro de Atacama.

- June 28 - Saint Peter
- June 29 - Saint Paul
- Feb 2 - Virgin de la Candelaria

== Image gallery ==
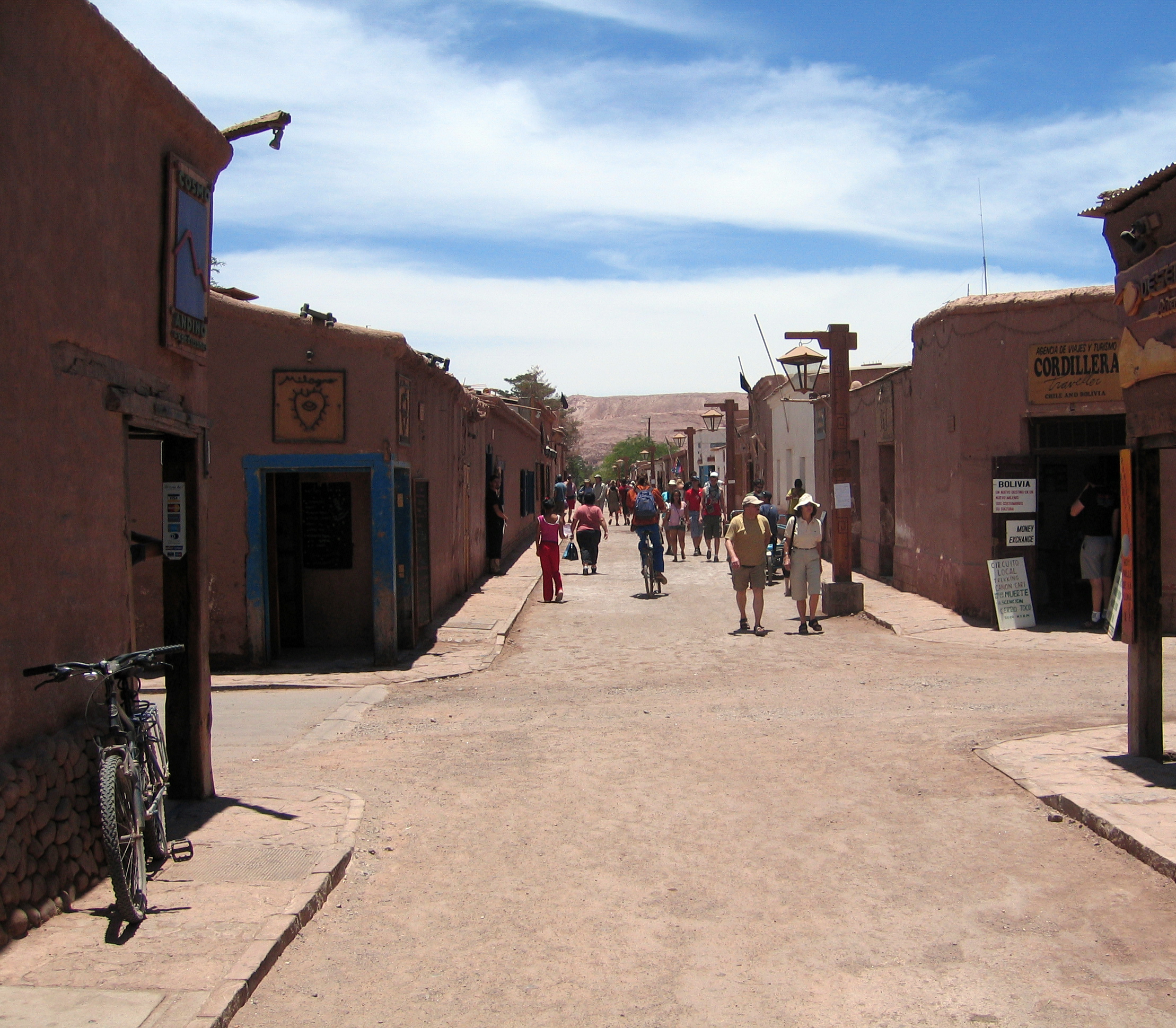
Street view of San Pedro de Atacama

San Pedro de Atacama Church

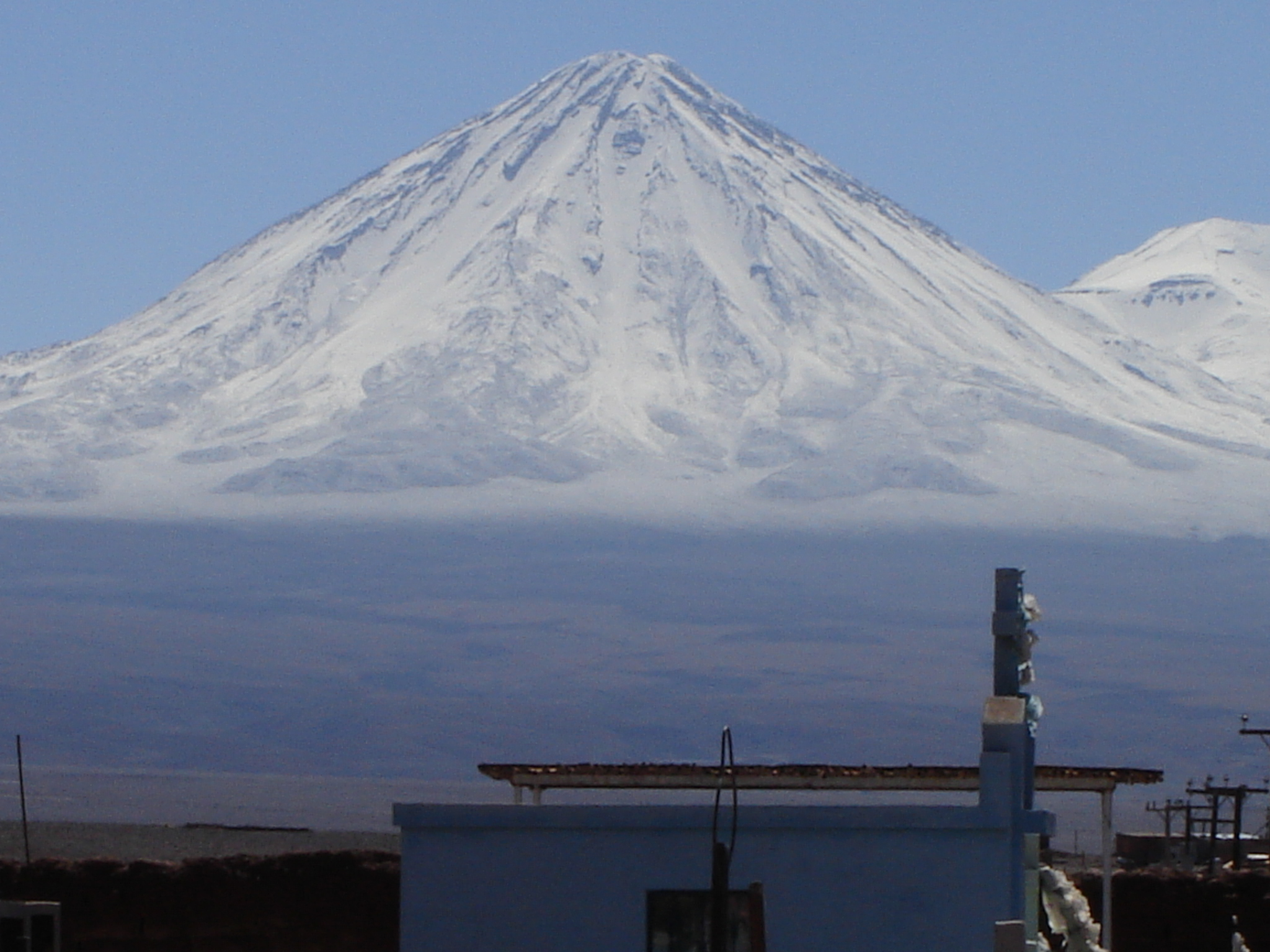
Licancabur volcano viewed from San Pedro de Atacama

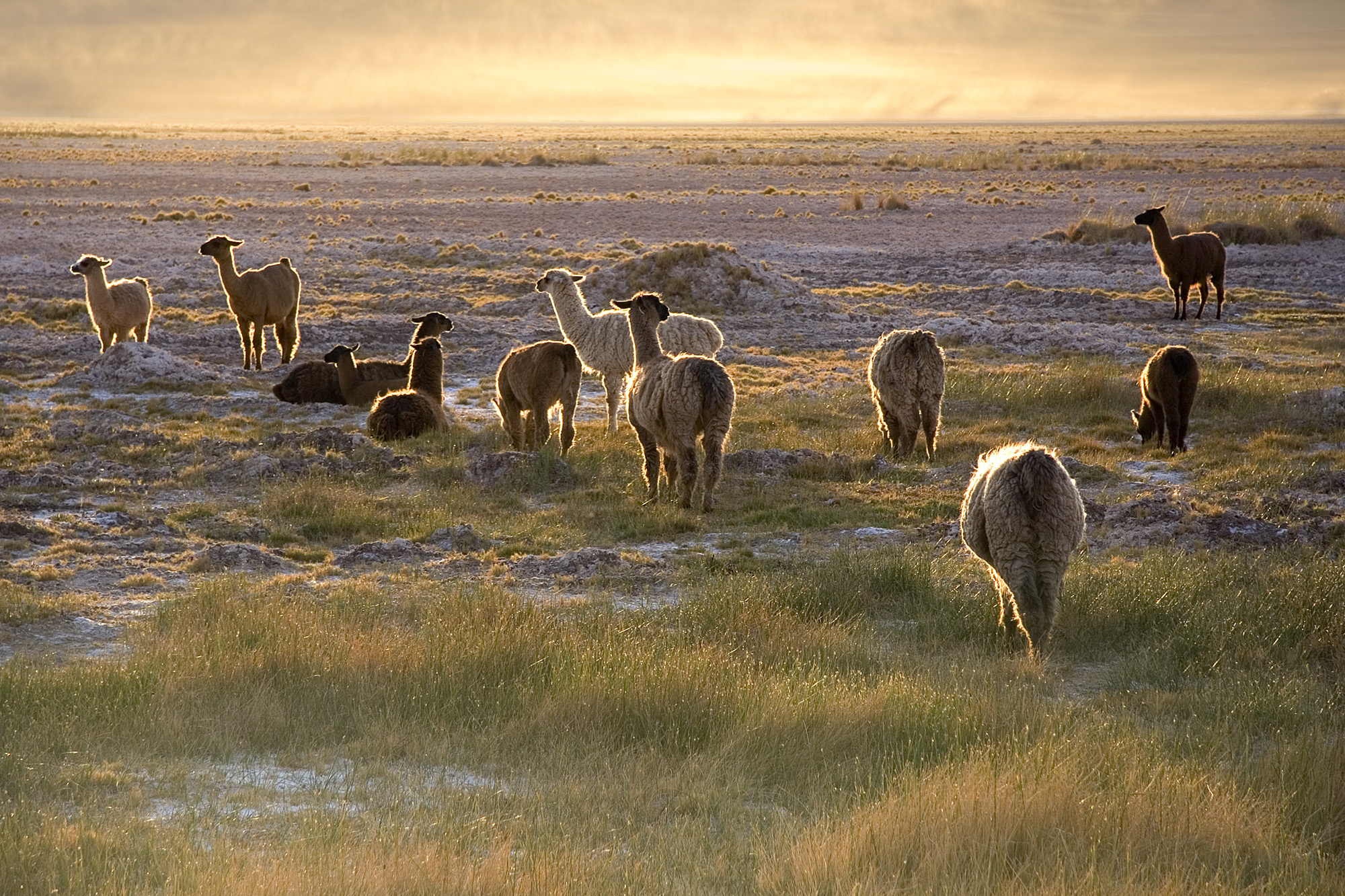
Llamas in the sunset near San Pedro de Atacama

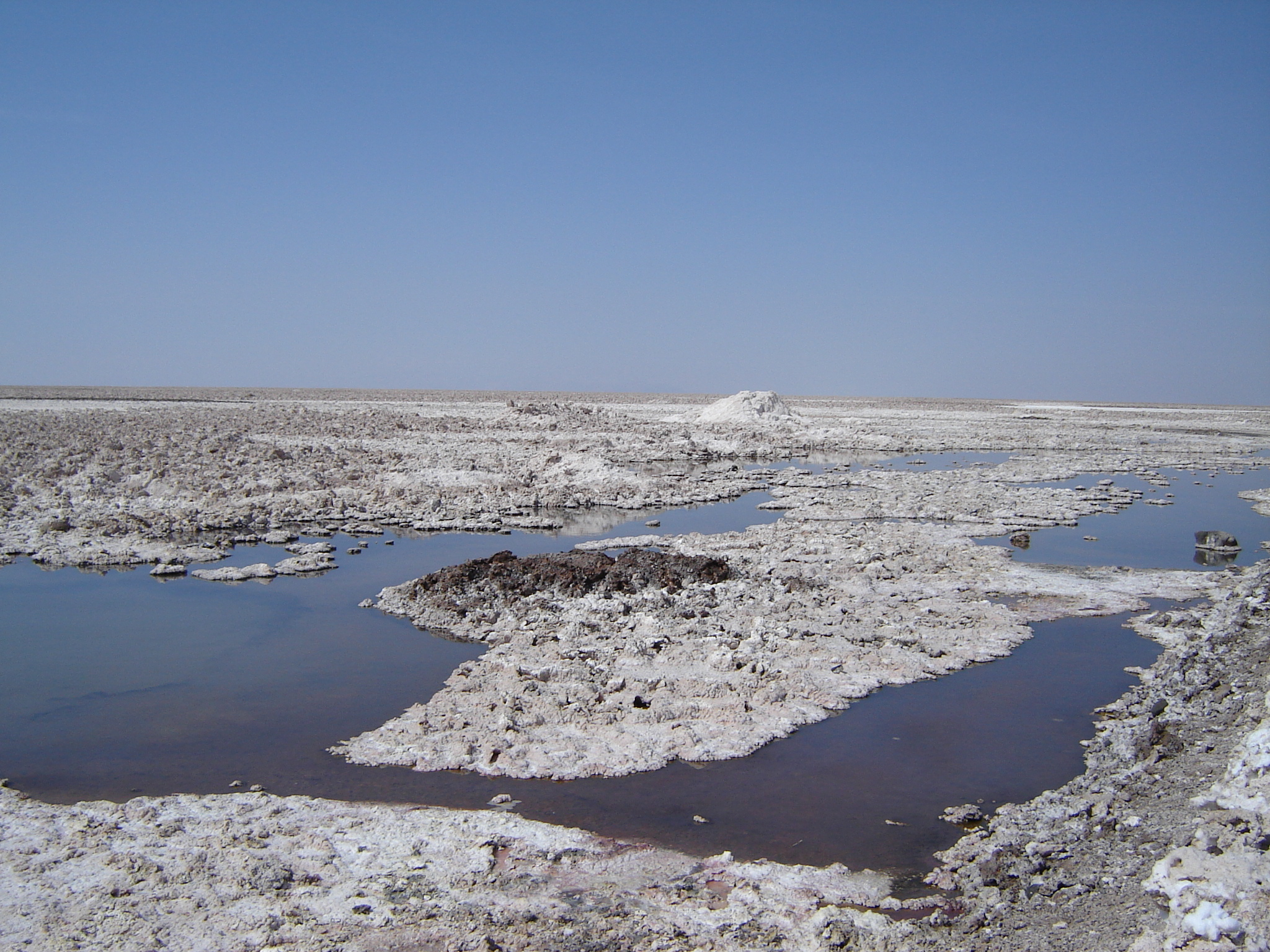
Part of the Chaxas lagoon in the Salar de Atacama.

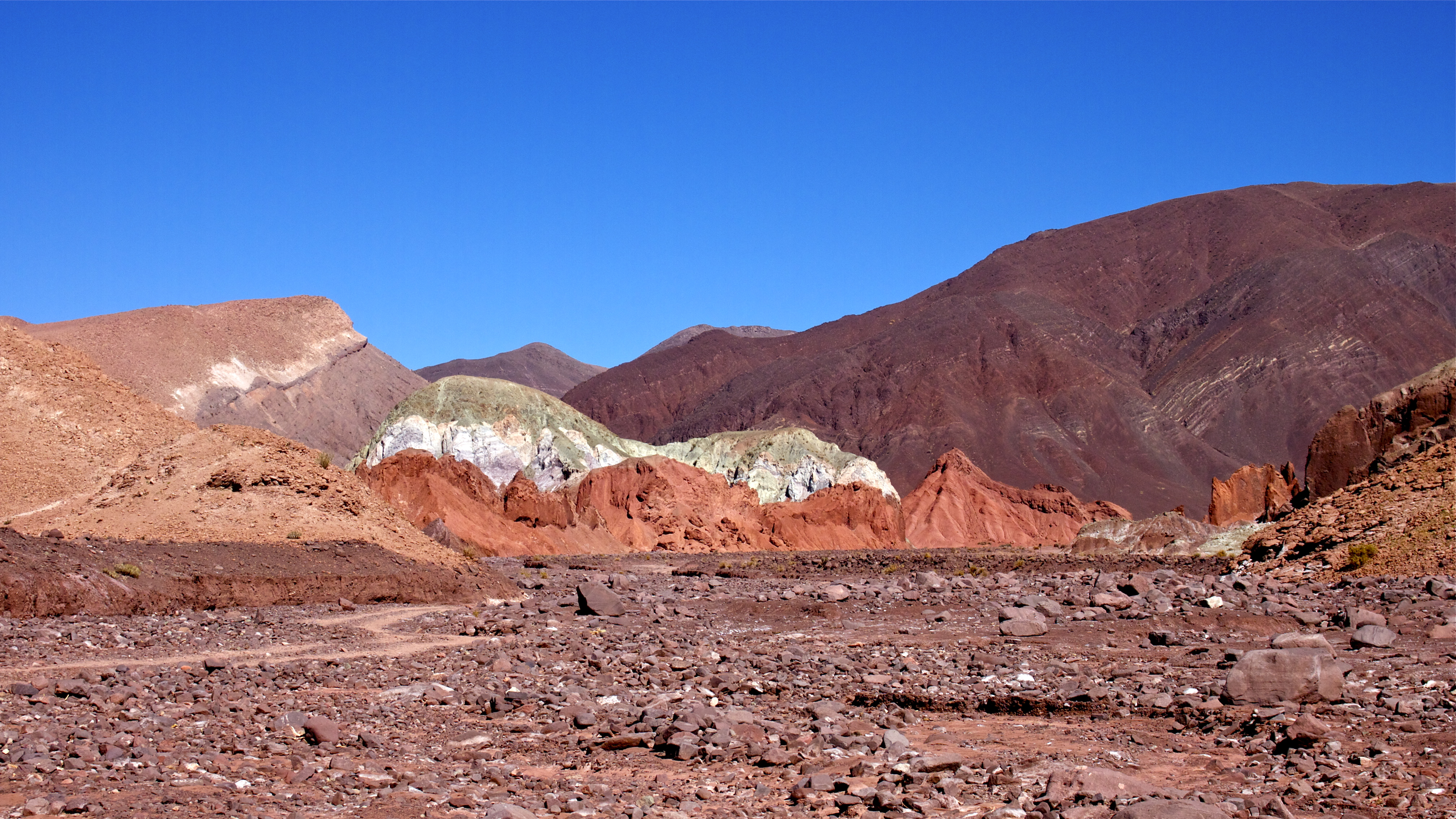
Rainbow Valley.

== See also ==
- Atacama Desert
- Puna de Atacama
- Eduardo Abaroa
- List of towns in Chile
- Monturaqui crater
