= NSHS =

NSHS as an acronym can refer to many High Schools:

- North Salem High School - Salem, Oregon
- North Stafford High School - Stafford, Virginia
- New School High School - Monmouth County, New Jersey
- Newman Smith High School - Carrollton, Texas
- North Scott High School - Eldridge, Iowa
- Newton South High School - Newton, Massachusetts
- North Springs High School - Sandy Springs, Georgia
- North Shore High School - Glen Head, New York
- North Shore High School - Harris County, Texas
- New Salem High School - North Dakota
- Ninety Six High School - Ninety-Six, South Carolina
- North Sanpete High School - Mt. Pleasant, Utah
- North Stanly High School - Stanly County, North Carolina
- North Surry High School - Mount Airy, North Carolina
- Nanuet Senior High School - Nanuet, New York
