= Longstreet Farm =

- U.S. National Register of Historic Places
- New Jersey Register of Historic Places
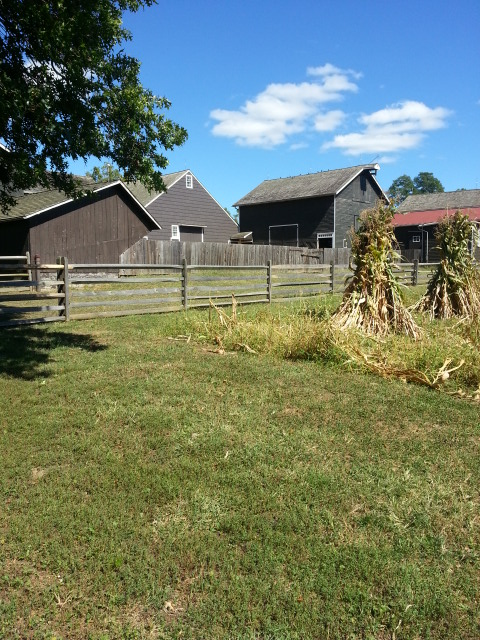

- Location within Monmouth County, New Jersey Location within New Jersey Location within the United States
- Location: 44 Longstreet Road, Holmdel Township, New Jersey
- Coordinates: 40°22′08″N 74°11′02″W
- Area: 9 acres (3.6 ha)
- NRHP reference No.: 79003255
- NJRHP No.: 1986

Significant dates
- Added to NRHP: November 29, 1979
- Designated NJRHP: June 5, 1979

Longstreet Farm is a living history farm located at 44 Longstreet Road in Holmdel Township, New Jersey, United States. The farm is 9 of 664 acres within Holmdel Park. It was added to the National Register of Historic Places on November 29, 1979, for its significance in agriculture and architecture. The listing has 19 buildings, including the farmhouse, which was built from 1790 to 1810.

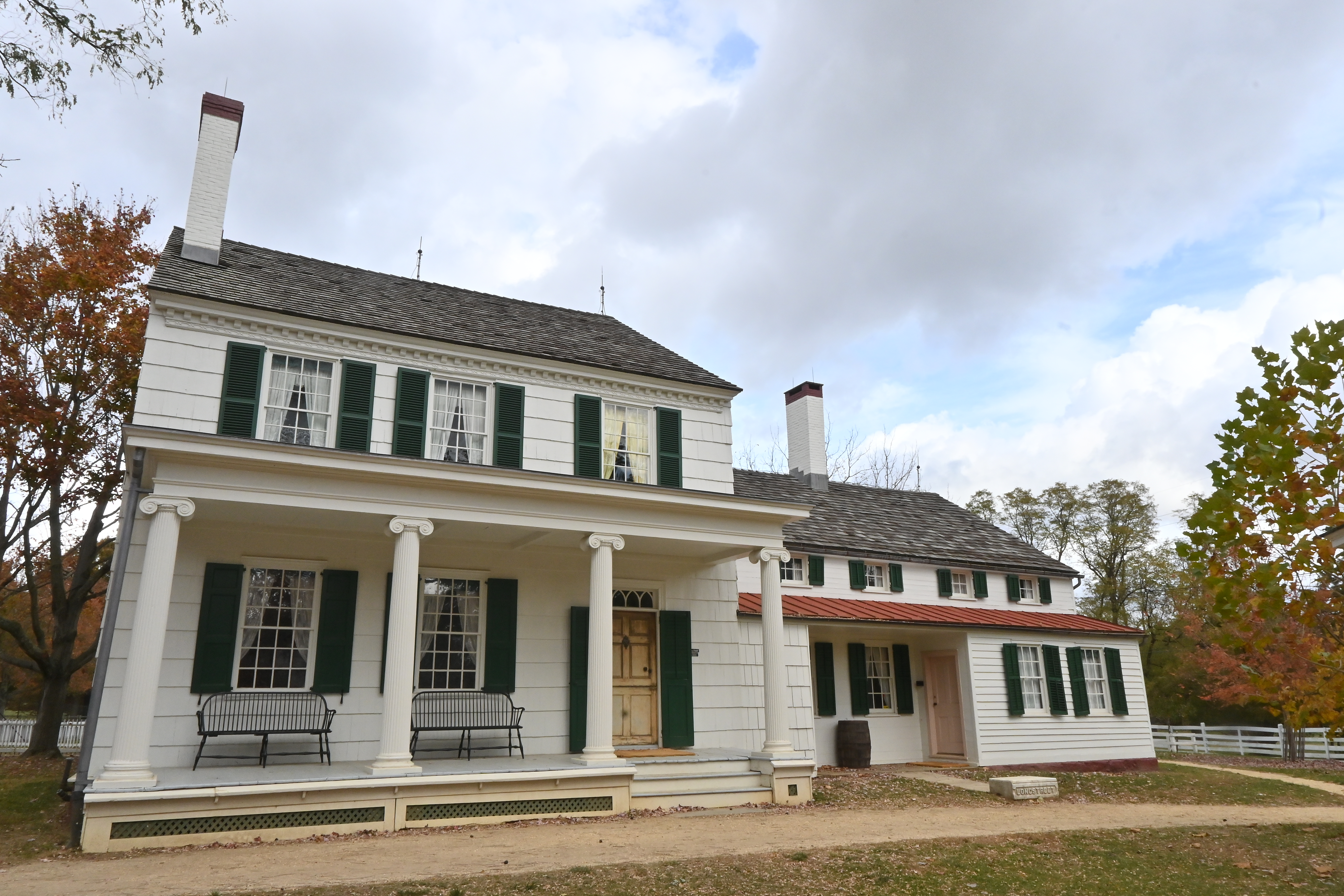
Farmhouse

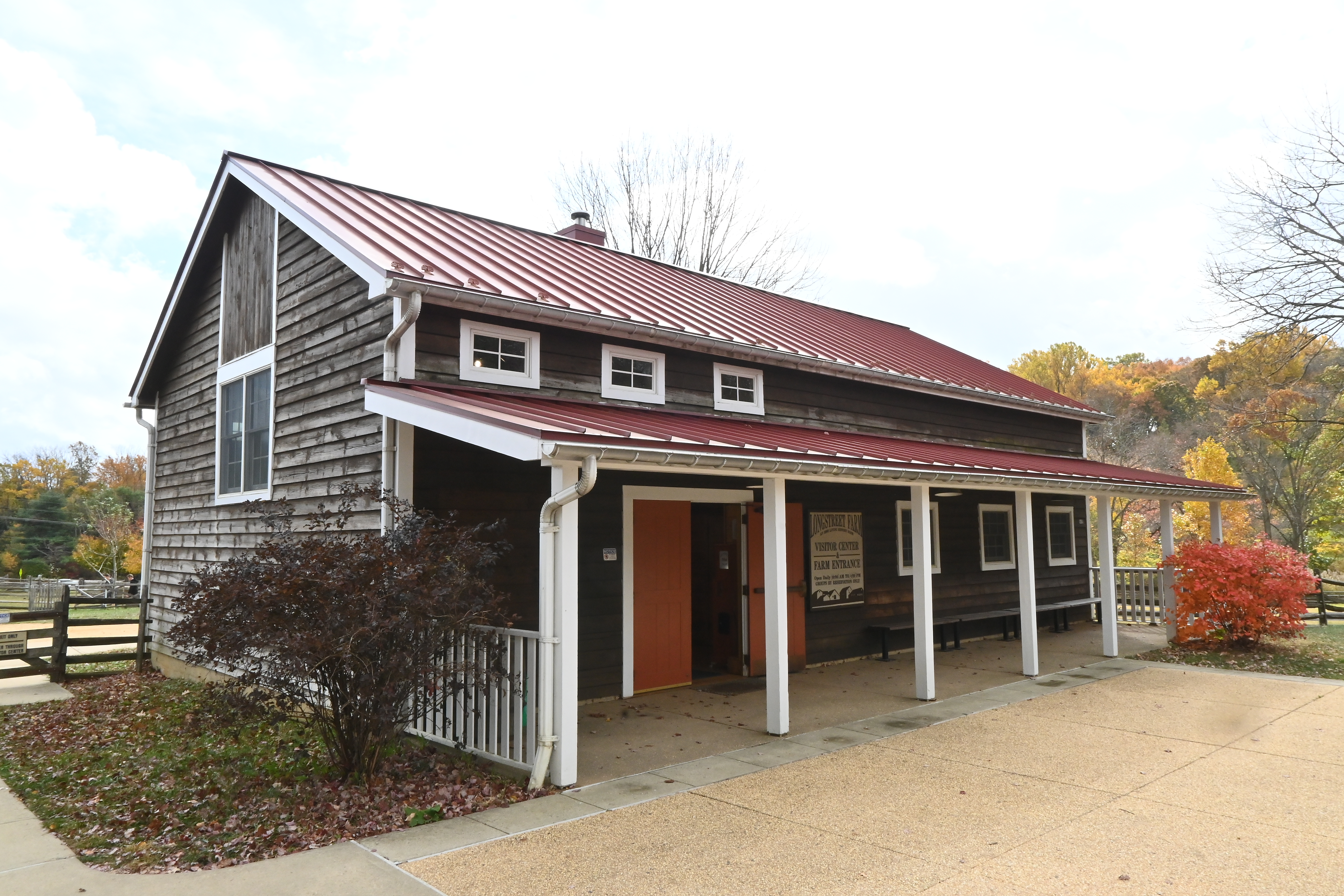
Visitor center

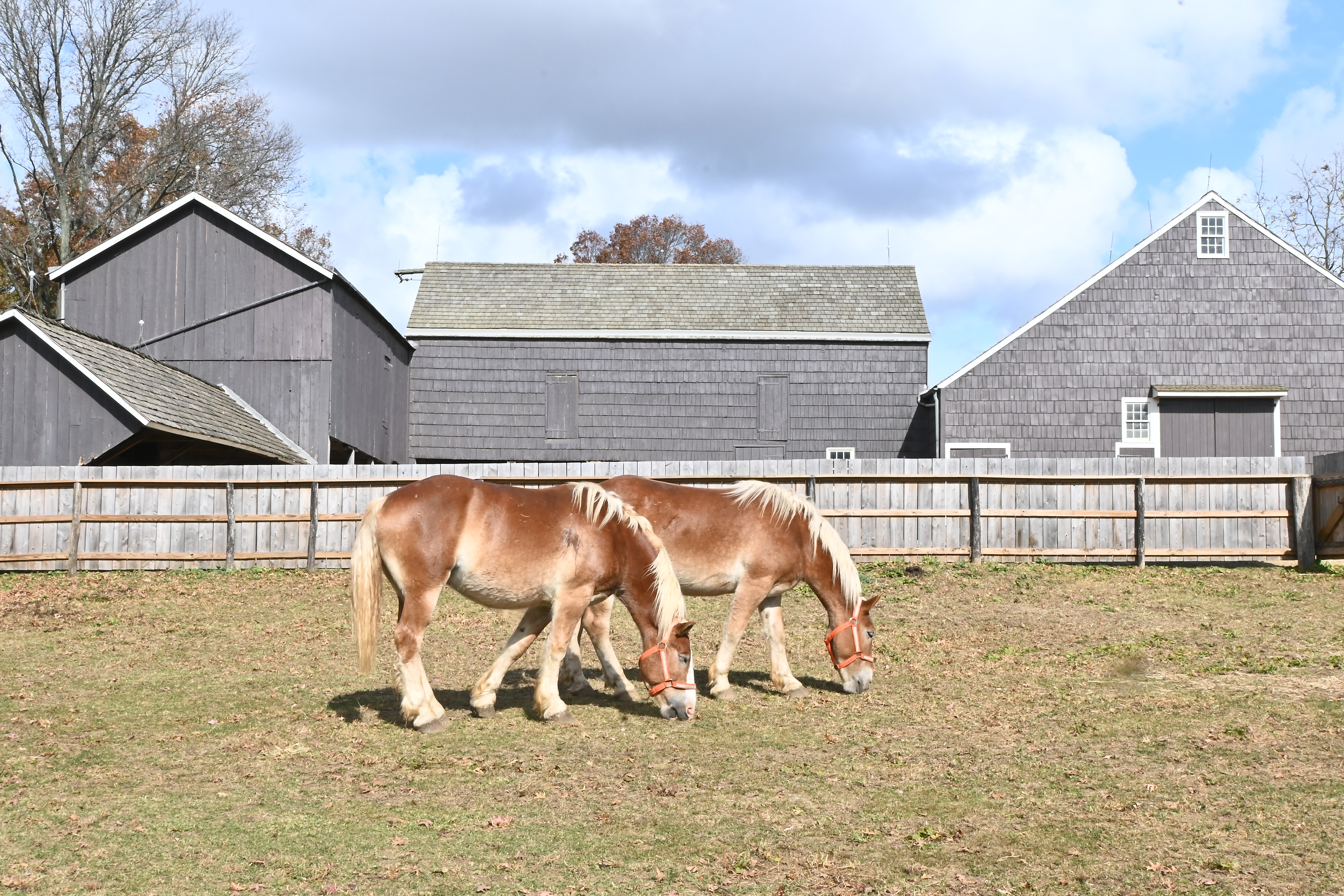
Farm horses

The farm is operated by the Monmouth County Park System. Today, the farm is a recreation of rural life in Monmouth County as it was in the 1890s. Staff dress in period clothing while performing the daily and seasonal agricultural and domestic activities of a resident of the time period, such as planting and harvesting of crops, taking care of the livestock, etc. Admission and parking are free.

The farm is open all year from 10am to 4pm, with extended hours from Memorial Day through Labor Day. The farm offers multiple activities for children through various programs, summer camps and events. The farmhouse is open weekends and holidays from March to December from 12pm to 3:30pm. Across the street is the Tenant House, which housed the workers of a tenant family and is today used for staff offices.

== See also ==
- National Register of Historic Places listings in Monmouth County, New Jersey
- Holmes–Hendrickson House
