= Holmdel Township, New Jersey =

Township in Monmouth County, New Jersey, US

- Township
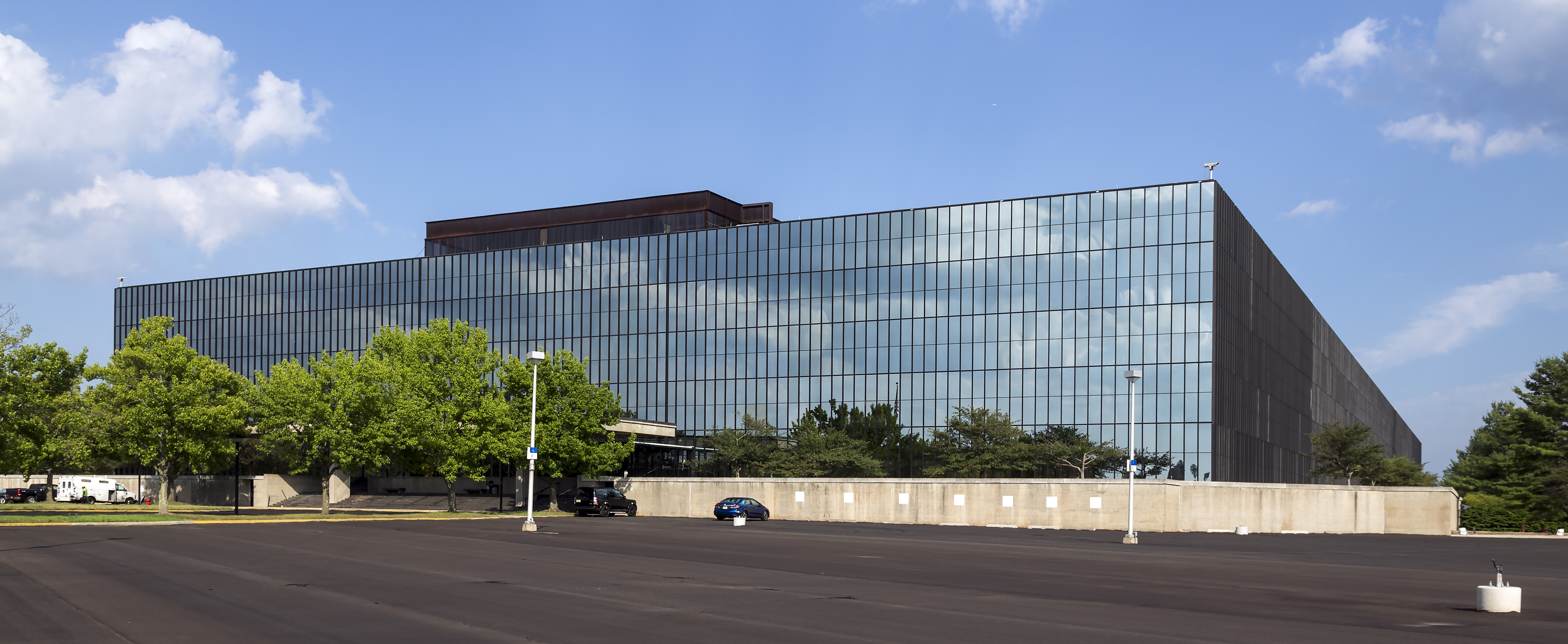
- Bell Labs

- Seal
- Interactive map of Holmdel Township, New Jersey
- Location in Monmouth County Location in New Jersey Location in the United States
- Coordinates: 40°22′48″N 74°10′39″W
- Country: United States
- State: New Jersey
- County: Monmouth
- Incorporated: February 23, 1857

Government
  - Type: Township
  - Body: Township Committee
  - Mayor: Rocco Impreveduto (R, term ends December 31, 2026)
  - Administrator: Christopher Cherbini
  - Municipal clerk: Wendy Patrovich

Area
  - Total: 18.05 sq mi (46.75 km^{2})
  - Land: 17.85 sq mi (46.22 km^{2})
  - Water: 0.20 sq mi (0.53 km^{2}) 1.13%
  - Rank: 156th of 565 in state 10th of 53 in county
- Elevation: 144 ft (44 m)

Population (2020)
  - Total: 17,400
  - Estimate (2023): 17,402
  - Rank: 153rd of 565 in state 13th of 53 in county
  - Density: 975/sq mi (376/km^{2})
  - Rank: 388th of 565 in state 45th of 53 in county
- Time zone: UTC−05:00 (Eastern (EST))
  - Summer (DST): UTC−04:00 (Eastern (EDT))
- ZIP Codes: 07733
- Area code: 732
- FIPS code: 3402532640
- GNIS feature ID: 0882119
- Website: holmdeltownship.com

Holmdel is a township in Monmouth County, in the U.S. state of New Jersey. Located near Raritan Bay in the Raritan Valley Region, the township is a regional commercial hub of Central Jersey, home to Bell Labs and PNC Bank Arts Center, and a bedroom community of New York City in the New York area.

As of the 2020 U.S. census, the township's population was 17,400, an increase of 627 (+3.7%) from the 2010 census count of 16,773, which in turn reflected an increase of 992 (+6.3%) from the 15,781 counted in the 2000 census.

Holmdel Township was formed by an act of the New Jersey Legislature on February 23, 1857, from portions of Raritan Township (now Hazlet). The origin of the township's name is unclear, with some sources indicating that it was named for the Holmes family, who were early settlers of the area, while others point to Dutch language words holm and del, meaning 'pleasant valley'.

Holmdel is located 15 miles (24 km) west of the Jersey Shore. The township is notable for its historical and present connection to Bell Labs. Important evidence for the Big Bang was discovered using the Holmdel Horn Antenna at a Bell Labs facility by Arno Penzias and Robert Wilson, both of whom won the Nobel Prize in Physics for their work here. In addition, former U.S. Secretary of Energy Steven Chu earned a Nobel Prize in Physics for his work on laser cooling in Holmdel.

Holmdel's picturesque beauty, proximity to New York City, and main highways, award-winning public schools, large homes, rich history, the PNC Bank Arts Center, and the presence of many high paying jobs within commuting distance led the township to be ranked the #1 "Six-Figure Town" by Money magazine and CNN for 2009.

The township has been one of the state's highest-income communities. Based on data from the American Community Survey for 2013–2017, Holmdel Township residents had a median household income of $155,842, ranked 10th in the state among municipalities with more than 10,000 residents, more than double the statewide median of $76,475. Based on data from the 2006–2010 ACS, Holmdel had a per-capita income of $62,120, ranked 46th in the state.

== History ==
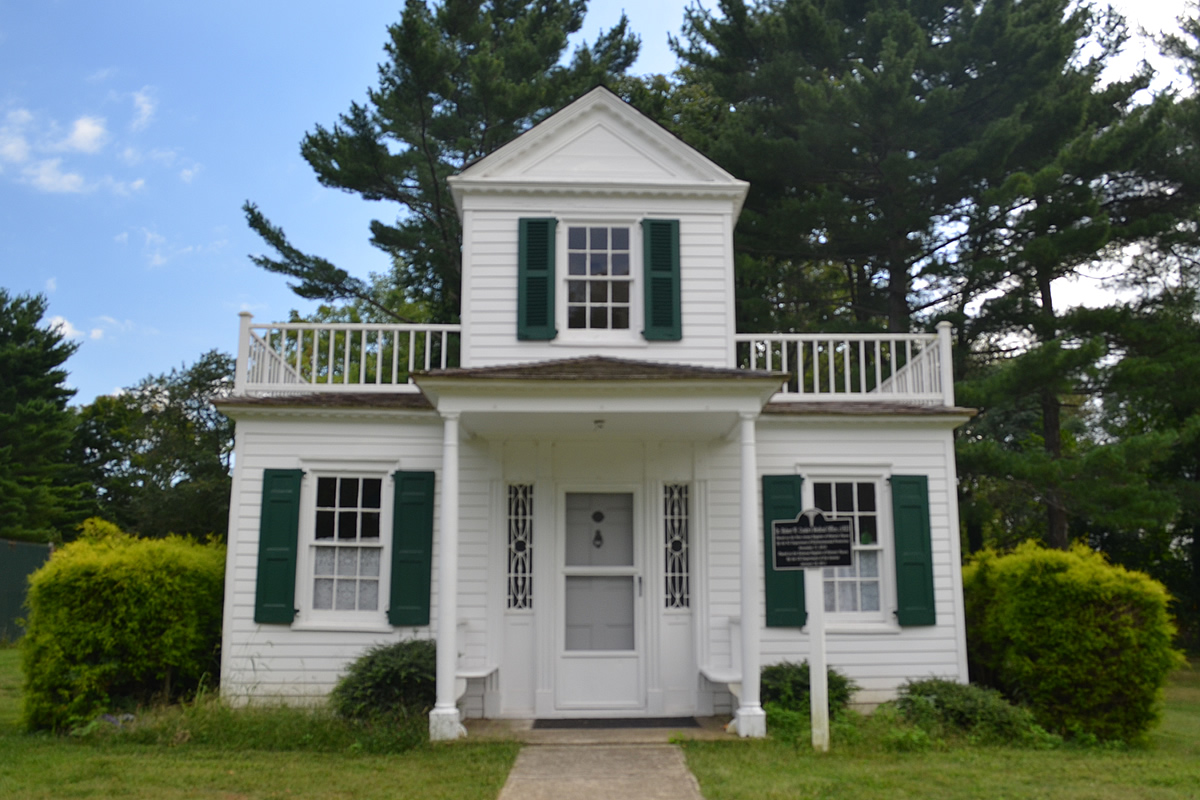
The Dr. Robert W. Cooke Medical Office, built c.1823 by Robert W. Cooke as a medical office.

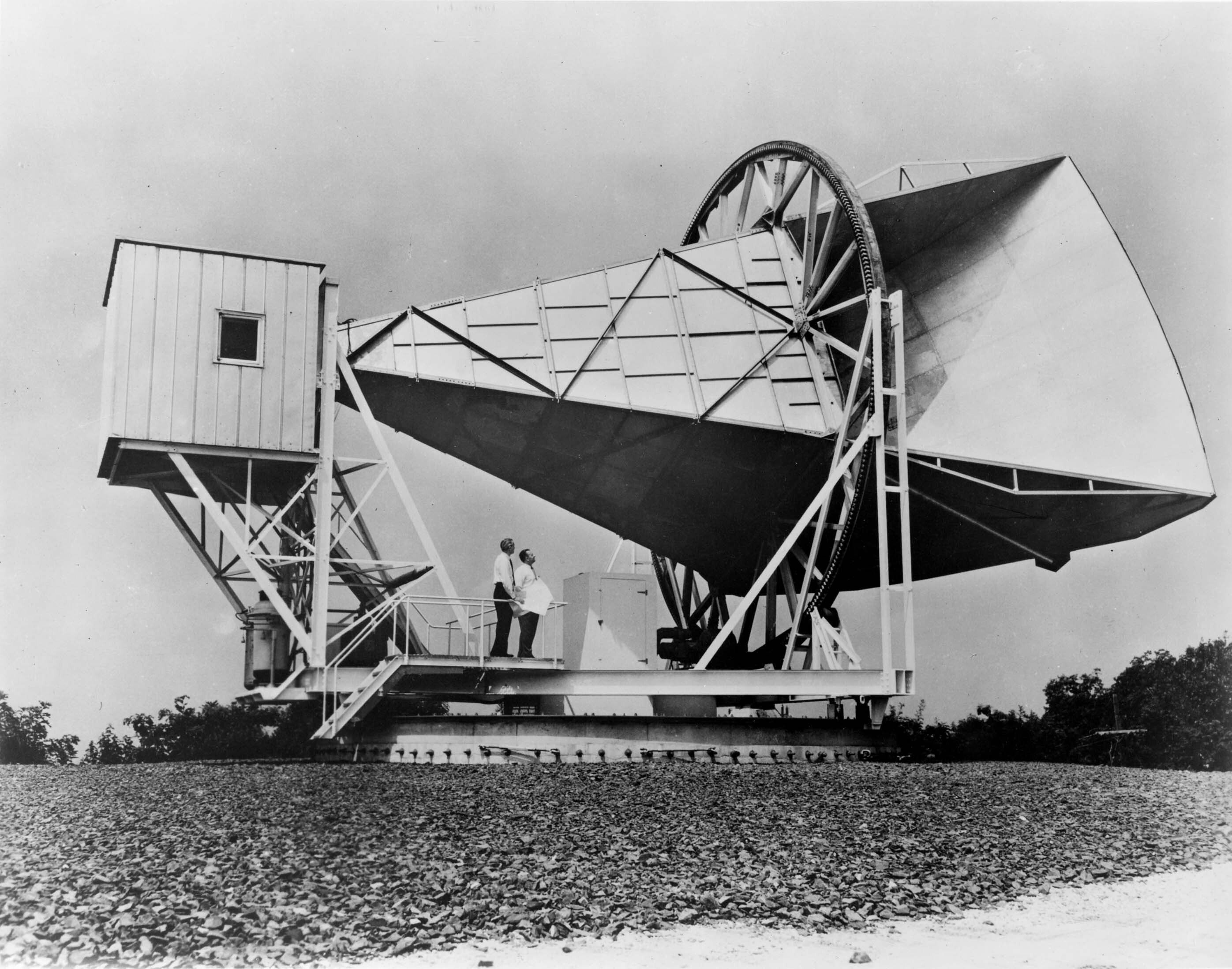
The Holmdel Horn Antenna

The Lenape people were present in the 1600s when Europeans first showed up in the area that is now Holmdel. Holmdel was part of the Monmouth Tract setup by the English in 1675. The area was part of Middletown township when that was set up in 1693, but, split off in 1848 to form part of Raritan township (now Hazlet) which in turn split off Holmdel Township (February 23, 1857).

The earliest work on radio astronomy was conducted by Bell Labs engineer Karl Guthe Jansky in 1931 in Holmdel. In 1964, Arno Penzias and Robert Woodrow Wilson of Bell Labs discovered evidence for cosmic microwave background radiation while performing research with the Holmdel Horn Antenna, earning them the Nobel Prize in Physics.

The PNC Bank Arts Center is a 10,800-seat outdoor amphitheatre concert venue located in Holmdel. PNC Financial Services agreed to a deal in 1996 under which it would pay $9.2 million for the naming rights, as part an effort by the Parkway Authority to avoid toll increases, a deal that was extended for another five years in 2006. The facility, which originally opened in 1968, was commissioned by the Garden State Parkway Authority and built based on a design by architect Edward Durell Stone at a cost of $6.75 million (equivalent to $62.5 million in 2025). Adjacent to it is the New Jersey Vietnam Veterans Memorial, which opened on May 7, 1995.

In 1977, Bruce Springsteen wrote and recorded many of his songs from his album Darkness on the Edge of Town in an old farmhouse in Holmdel.

VoIP provider Vonage Holdings, Inc., relocated its world headquarters from Edison to Holmdel in November 2005, occupying the building that formerly housed Prudential Property Casualty & Insurance.

== Geography ==
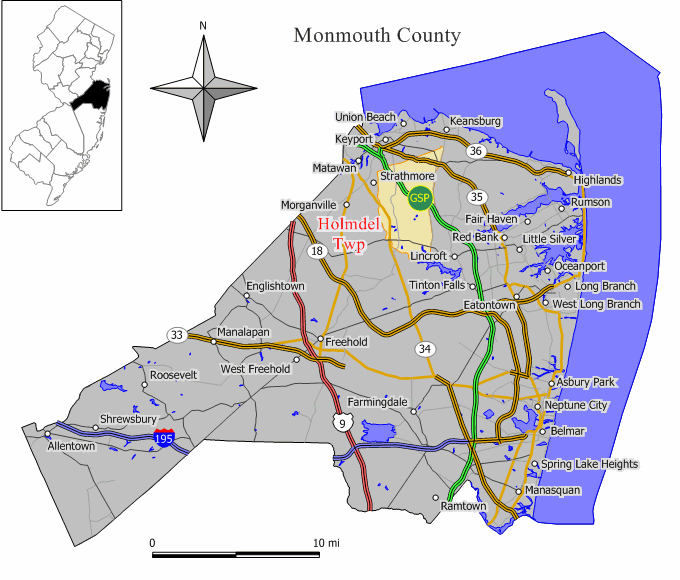
Map of Holmdel Township in Monmouth County. Inset: Location of Monmouth County in the State of New Jersey.

According to the United States Census Bureau, the township had a total area of 18.05 square miles (46.75 km^{2}), including 17.85 square miles (46.22 km^{2}) of land and 0.20 square miles (0.53 km^{2}) of water (1.13%). Holmdel Township is located roughly 40 miles (64 km) south of Manhattan. It is also about 70 miles northeast of Philadelphia.

Crawford Hill, located at 40°23′25″N 74°11′02″W (40.3904, −74.1840), is Monmouth County's highest point, standing 391 feet (119 m) above sea level. The top portion of the hill is owned by Alcatel-Lucent and houses a research laboratory of Bell Laboratories.

The township borders the Monmouth County communities of Aberdeen, Colts Neck, Hazlet, Marlboro and Middletown.

Unincorporated communities, localities and place names located partially or completely within the township include: Beers, Centerville, Crawford Corners, Everett, Morrells Corner and Pleasant Valley Crossroads.

As of 2026, the township is a member of Local Leaders for Responsible Planning in order to address the township's Mount Laurel doctrine-based housing obligations.

== Demographics ==
Historical population
Census	Pop.	Note	%±
1860	1,334		—
1870	1,415		6.1%
1880	1,575		11.3%
1890	1,479		−6.1%
1900	1,190		−19.5%
1910	1,058		−11.1%
1920	1,100		4.0%
1930	1,191		8.3%
1940	1,201		0.8%
1950	1,380		14.9%
1960	2,959		114.4%
1970	6,117		106.7%
1980	8,447		38.1%
1990	11,532		36.5%
2000	15,781		36.8%
2010	16,773		6.3%
2020	17,400		3.7%
2023 (est.)	17,402		0.0%
Population sources: 1860–1920; 1860–1870 1870 1880–1890; 1890–1910 1910–1930; 1940–2000 2000; 2010 2020

In 2009, the average annual family income was $159,633, making it one of the highest in the country.

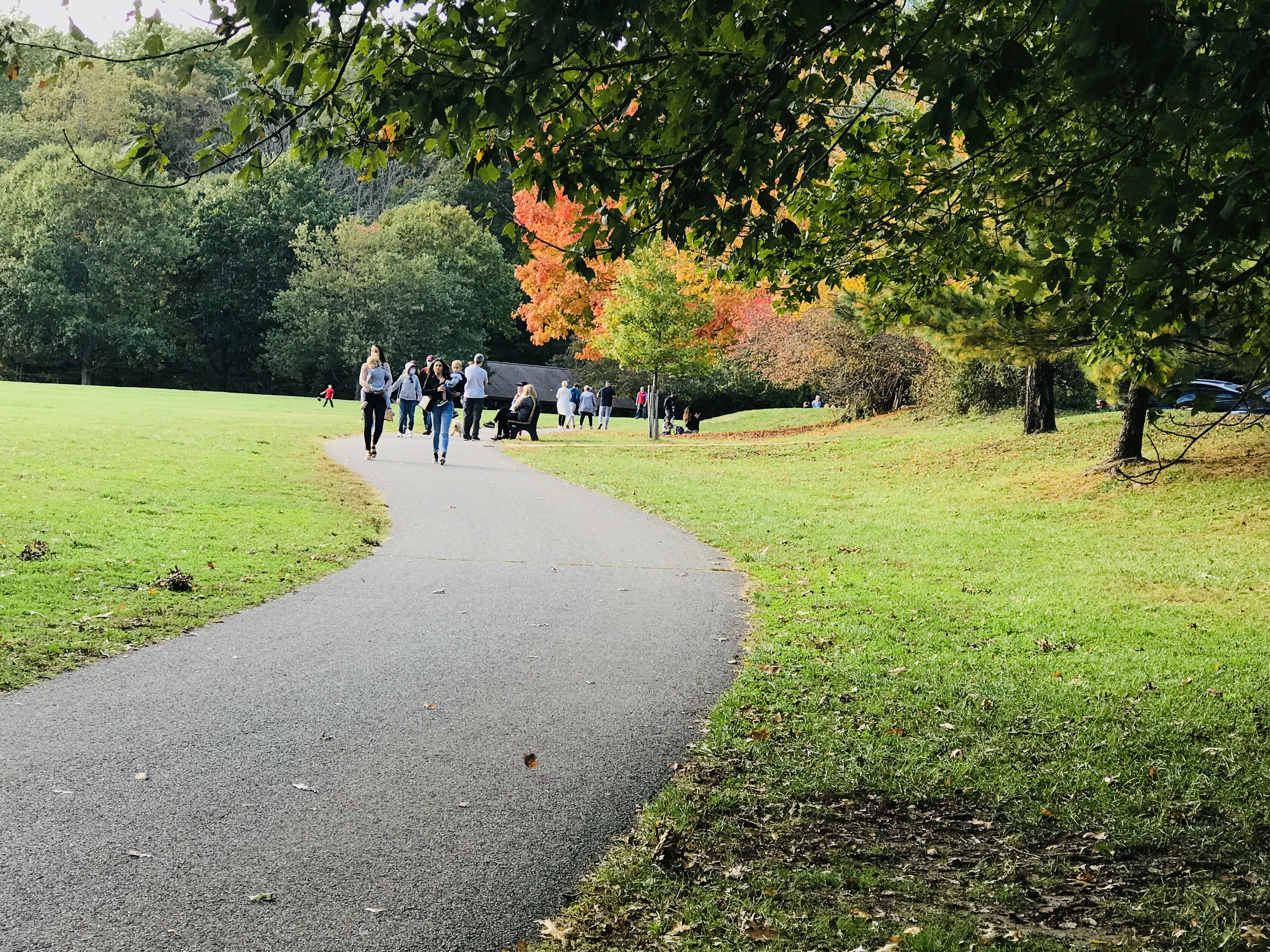
Holmdel Park on a calm afternoon

=== 2010 census ===
The 2010 United States census counted 16,773 people, 5,584 households, and 4,612 families in the township. The population density was 937.3 per square mile (361.9/km^{2}). There were 5,792 housing units at an average density of 323.7 per square mile (125.0/km^{2}). The racial makeup was 77.55% (13,007) White, 0.86% (145) Black or African American, 0.07% (11) Native American, 19.16% (3,213) Asian, 0.01% (2) Pacific Islander, 0.54% (90) from other races, and 1.82% (305) from two or more races. Hispanic or Latino of any race were 3.70% (621) of the population.

Of the 5,584 households, 40.8% had children under the age of 18; 73.5% were married couples living together; 6.9% had a female householder with no husband present and 17.4% were non-families. Of all households, 15.7% were made up of individuals and 8.9% had someone living alone who was 65 years of age or older. The average household size was 2.92 and the average family size was 3.29.

25.8% of the population were under the age of 18, 6.2% from 18 to 24, 17.8% from 25 to 44, 33.9% from 45 to 64, and 16.3% who were 65 years of age or older. The median age was 45.1 years. For every 100 females, the population had 93.3 males. For every 100 females ages 18 and older there were 89.9 males.

The Census Bureau's 2006–2010 American Community Survey showed that (in 2010 inflation-adjusted dollars) median household income was $140,533 (with a margin of error of +/− $18,587) and the median family income was $154,360 (+/− $13,795). Males had a median income of $135,139 (+/− $15,633) versus $77,703 (+/− $13,861) for females. The per capita income for the township was $62,120 (+/− $6,232). About 3.0% of families and 3.8% of the population were below the poverty line, including 4.0% of those under age 18 and 1.0% of those age 65 or over.

=== 2000 census ===
As of the 2000 United States census there were 15,781 people, 4,948 households, and 4,328 families residing in the township. The population density was 878.4 inhabitants per square mile (339.2/km^{2}). There were 5,137 housing units at an average density of 285.9 per square mile (110.4/km^{2}). The racial makeup of the township was 80.20% White, 17.45% Asian, 0.65% African American, 0.03% Native American, 0.01% Pacific Islander, 0.52% from other races, and 1.15% from two or more races. Hispanic or Latino of any race were 2.45% of the population.

As of the 2000 Census, 9.97% of Holmdel Township's residents identified themselves as being of Chinese ancestry. This was the highest percentage of people with Chinese ancestry in any place in New Jersey with 1,000 or more residents identifying their ancestry.

There were 4,947 households, out of which 47.1% had children under the age of 18 living with them, 79.1% were married couples living together, 6.7% had a female householder with no husband present, and 12.5% were non-families. 11.1% of all households were made up of individuals, and 4.3% had someone living alone who was 65 years of age or older. The average household size was 3.09 and the average family size was 3.35.

In the township the age distribution of the population shows 28.5% under the age of 18, 5.2% from 18 to 24, 24.8% from 25 to 44, 29.2% from 45 to 64, and 12.2% who were 65 years of age or older. The median age was 41 years. For every 100 females, there were 91.9 males. For every 100 females age 18 and over, there were 86.6 males.

According to the 2000 Census, the median income for a household in the township was $112,879, and the median income for a family was $122,785. Males had a median income of $94,825 versus $54,625 for females. The per capita income for the township was $47,898. About 2.7% of families and 3.4% of the population were below the poverty line, including 4.0% of those under age 18 and 6.7% of those age 65 or over.

== Arts and culture ==
Musical groups from Holmdel Township include Granian, a band formed by musician Garen Guyikian.

== Parks and recreation ==
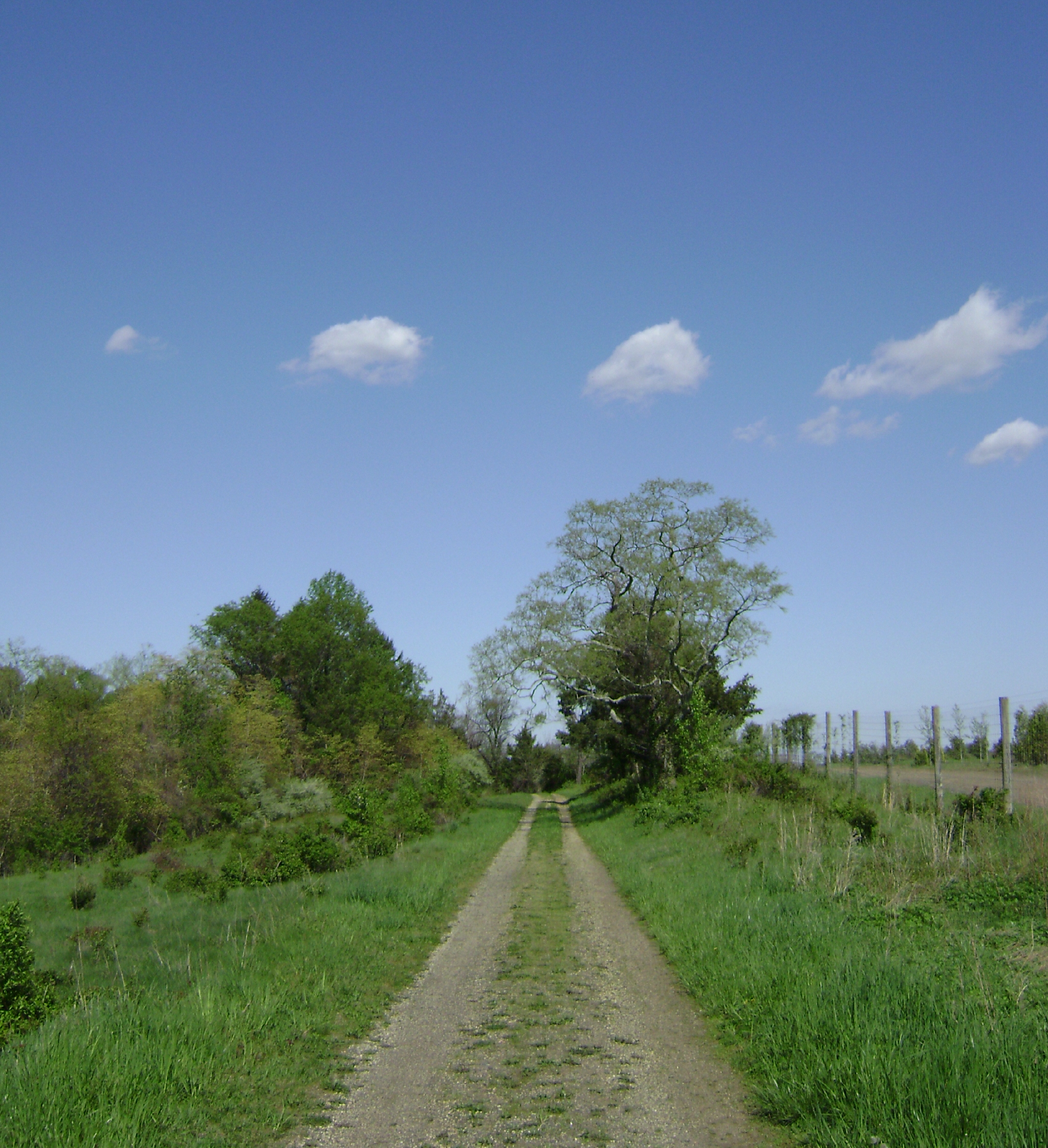
Steeplechase Trail, Holmdel Park

Holmdel Park, initially established in 1962, covers 565 acres (229 ha) and includes the Historic Longstreet Farm, which offers a recreation of farm life in the 1890s, along with athletic facilities and other amenities. The park also has the Holmdel Arboretum (formally the David C. Shaw Arboretum), covering 22 acres (8.9 ha) and established in 1963, which offers examples of the trees, shrubs and plant life of Monmouth County.

== Government ==
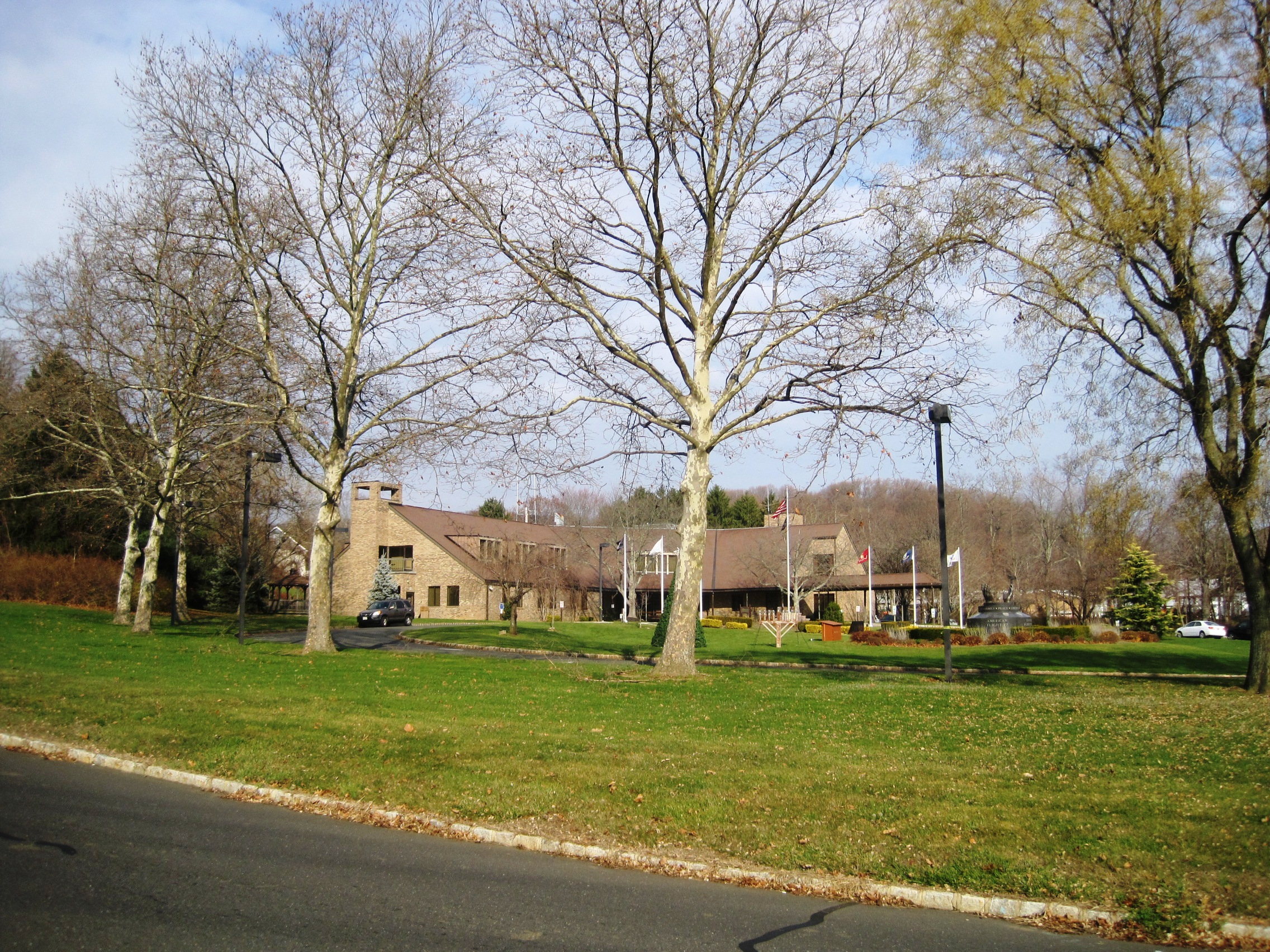
Holmdel Town Hall at Crawfords Corner

=== Local government ===
Holmdel Township is governed under the Township form of New Jersey municipal government, one of 141 municipalities (of the 564) statewide that use this form, the second-most commonly used form of government in the state. The Township Committee is comprised of five members, who are elected directly by the voters at-large in partisan elections to serve three-year terms of office on a staggered basis, with either one or two seats coming up for election each year as part of the November general election in a three-year cycle. At an annual reorganization meeting, the Township Committee selects one of its members to serve as Mayor and another as Deputy Mayor. The Township Committee exercises control over the conduct of municipal business by means of legislation through ordinances or resolutions, approval and adoption of the annual budget and the formulation of policy to be carried out by the staff.

As of 2026, members of the Holmdel Township Council are Mayor Rocco Impreveduto (R, term on committee ends 2027 and as mayor ends December 31, 2026), Deputy Mayor Brian Foster (R, term on committee ends 2028 as deputy mayor ends 2026), Gary Vanderham (R, 2026) Joseph Romano (R, 2026) Gregory Buontempo R, 2028.

In November 2021, voters approved the establishment of a Charter Study Commission that would review the township's options for changing its form of government and would make recommendations to be considered by the public. In April 2022, the commission recommended that the township adopt the Council-Manager form of government available under the Faulkner Act, in which the main change from the current government would be that day-to-day operation of the township would be in the hands of a professional administrator. Led by opposition from Monmouth County Republicans, voters rejected the proposed changes in July 2022 by a 55–45% margin.

In the November 2019 general election, a recount put two independent candidates in office, with Prakash Santhana winning the second of the two seats by a margin of two votes over the Republican candidate.

Deputy Mayor Serena DiMaso left office in January 2012 to fill the vacant seat of Robert D. Clifton on the Monmouth County Board of Chosen Freeholders. Joseph Ponisi was selected to fill Dimaso's vacant seat and took office in January 2012, then was elected to the remainder of her term in the November 2012 general election.

=== Federal, state, and county representation ===
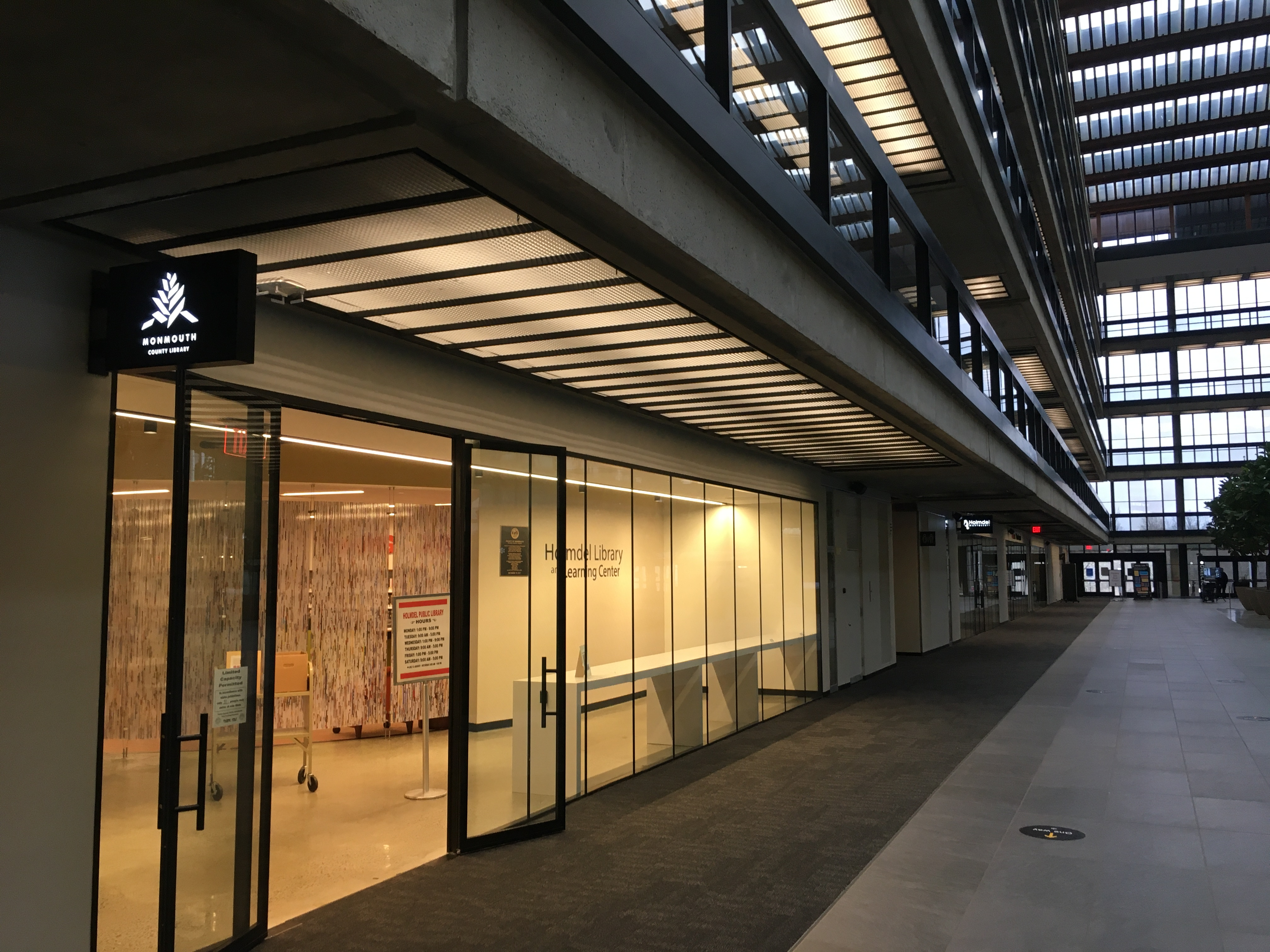
The Holmdel Public Library in 2021 – newly located within Bell Works, the repurposed former Bell Labs Holmdel Complex

Holmdel Township is located in the 3rd Congressional District and is part of New Jersey's 13th state legislative district.

Prior to the 2010 Census, Holmdel Township had been part of the 12th Congressional District, a change made by the New Jersey Redistricting Commission that took effect in January 2013, based on the results of the November 2012 general elections.

For the 119th United States Congress, New Jersey's 3rd congressional district is currently represented Herb Conaway (D, Delran Township). New Jersey is represented in the United States Senate by Democrats Cory Booker (Newark, term ends 2027) and Andy Kim (Moorestown, term ends 2031).

For the 2026–2027 session, the 13th legislative district of the New Jersey Legislature is represented in the New Jersey Senate by Declan O'Scanlon (R, Little Silver) and in the General Assembly by Vicky Flynn (R, Holmdel Township) and Gerard Scharfenberger (R, Middletown Township).

Monmouth County is governed by a Board of County Commissioners composed of five members who are elected at-large to serve three-year terms of office on a staggered basis, with either one or two seats up for election each year as part of the November general election. At an annual reorganization meeting held in the beginning of January, the board selects one of its members to serve as director and another as deputy director.

As of 2025, Monmouth County's Commissioners are Director Thomas A. Arnone (R, Neptune City, 2025), Susan M. Kiley (R, Hazlet Township, 2027), Erik Anderson (R, Shrewsbury, 2026), Nick DiRocco (R, Wall Township, 2025), and Deputy Director Ross F. Licitra (R, Marlboro Township, 2026).

Constitutional officers elected on a countywide basis are Clerk Christine Giordano Hanlon (R, 2025; Ocean Township), Sheriff Shaun Golden (R, 2025; Howell Township) and Surrogate Rosemarie D. Peters (R, 2026; Middletown Township).

=== Politics ===
United States presidential election results for Holmdel
Year	Republican		Democratic		Third party(ies)	
Year	No.	%	No.	%	No.	%
2024	5,592	55.24%	4,266	42.14%	265	2.62%
2020	5,654	51.93%	5,092	46.77%	142	1.30%
2016	4,919	56.08%	3,577	40.78%	275	3.14%
2012	5,077	61.80%	3,063	37.29%	75	0.91%
2008	5,403	59.37%	3,616	39.73%	82	0.90%
2004	5,522	62.14%	3,308	37.23%	56	0.63%
2000	4,239	57.30%	2,897	39.16%	262	3.54%
1996	3,310	58.00%	1,977	34.64%	420	7.36%
1992	3,314	58.95%	1,484	26.40%	824	14.66%

As of March 2011, there were a total of 12,021 registered voters in Holmdel Township, of which 1,965 (16.3%) were registered as Democrats, 4,110 (34.2%) were registered as Republicans and 5,946 (49.5%) were registered as Unaffiliated. There were no voters registered to other parties.

Gubernatorial election results for Holmdel
Year	Republican		Democratic		Third party(ies)	
Year	No.	%	No.	%	No.	%
2025	4,556	56.90%	3,401	42.48%	50	0.62%
2021	4,163	60.92%	2,615	38.26%	56	0.82%
2017	3,050	61.11%	1,852	37.11%	89	1.78%
2013	3,587	77.34%	993	21.41%	58	1.25%
2009	4,182	68.16%	1,590	25.91%	364	5.93%
2005	3,333	61.51%	1,929	35.60%	157	2.90%

In the 2012 presidential election, Republican Mitt Romney received 61.8% of the vote (5,077 cast), ahead of Democrat Barack Obama with 37.3% (3,063 votes), and other candidates with 0.9% (75 votes), among the 8,261 ballots cast by the township's 12,425 registered voters (46 ballots were spoiled), for a turnout of 66.5%. In the 2008 presidential election, Republican John McCain received 58.6% of the vote (5,403 cast), ahead of Democrat Barack Obama with 39.2% (3,616 votes) and other candidates with 0.9% (82 votes), among the 9,225 ballots cast by the township's 12,679 registered voters, for a turnout of 72.8%. In the 2004 presidential election, Republican George W. Bush received 61.9% of the vote (5,522 ballots cast), outpolling Democrat John Kerry with 37.1% (3,308 votes) and other candidates with 0.5% (56 votes), among the 8,915 ballots cast by the township's 11,892 registered voters, for a turnout percentage of 75.0.

In the 2013 gubernatorial election, Republican Chris Christie received 77.3% of the vote (3,587 cast), ahead of Democrat Barbara Buono with 21.4% (993 votes), and other candidates with 1.3% (58 votes), among the 4,712 ballots cast by the township's 12,312 registered voters (74 ballots were spoiled), for a turnout of 38.3%. In the 2009 gubernatorial election, Republican Chris Christie received 67.8% of the vote (4,182 ballots cast), ahead of Democrat Jon Corzine with 25.8% (1,590 votes), Independent Chris Daggett with 5.2% (318 votes) and other candidates with 0.7% (46 votes), among the 6,170 ballots cast by the township's 12,315 registered voters, yielding a 50.1% turnout.

United States Senate election results for Holmdel1
Year	Republican		Democratic		Third party(ies)	
Year	No.	%	No.	%	No.	%
2024	5,367	54.57%	4,227	42.98%	241	2.45%
2018	4,201	59.24%	2,720	38.36%	170	2.40%
2012	5,038	64.15%	2,707	34.47%	109	1.39%
2006	3,279	59.20%	2,151	38.83%	109	1.97%

United States Senate election results for Holmdel2
Year	Republican		Democratic		Third party(ies)	
Year	No.	%	No.	%	No.	%
2020	5,929	54.98%	4,693	43.52%	161	1.49%
2014	2,855	61.78%	1,682	36.40%	84	1.82%
2013	1,884	63.50%	1,060	35.73%	23	0.78%
2008	5,239	61.61%	3,110	36.57%	155	1.82%

== Education ==
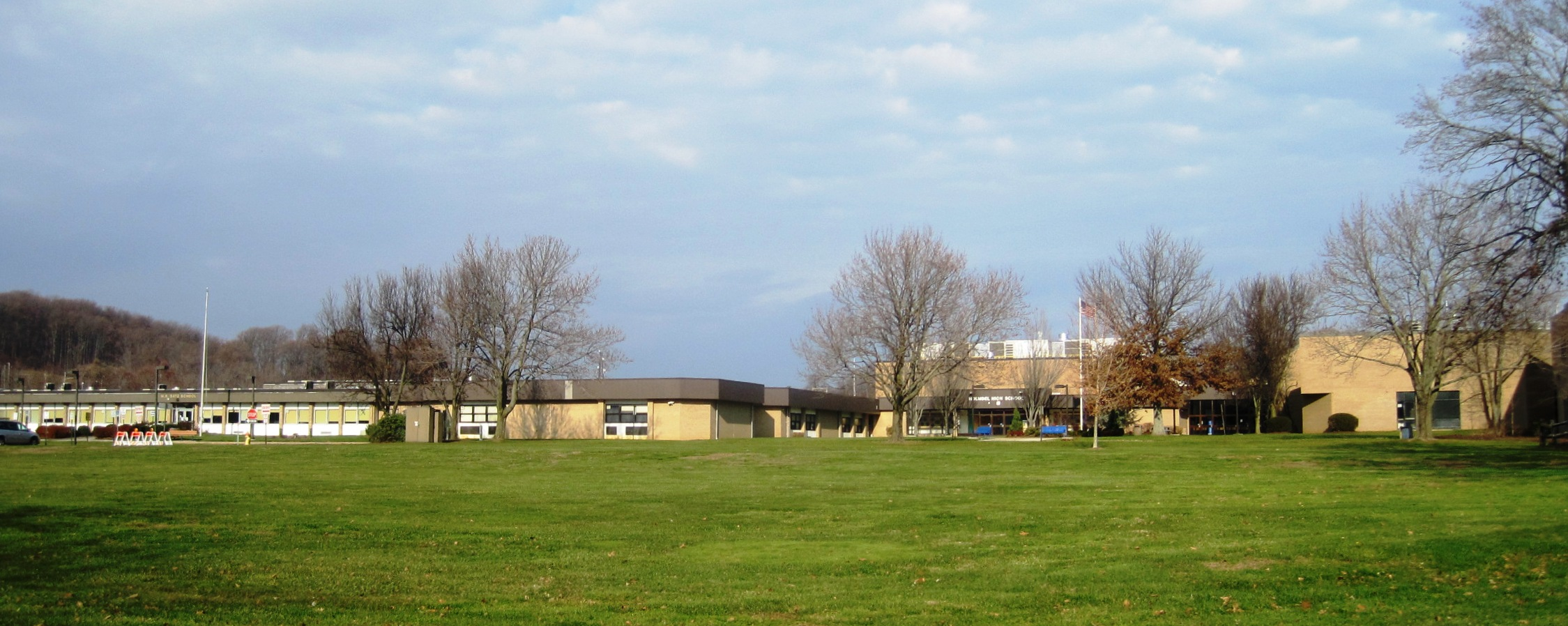
Holmdel High School located on Crawfords Corner Road

The Holmdel Township Public Schools serve students in pre-kindergarten through twelfth grade. As of the 2022–23 school year, the district, comprised of four schools, had an enrollment of 2,918 students and 289.0 classroom teachers (on an FTE basis), for a student–teacher ratio of 10.1:1. Schools in the district (with 2022–23 enrollment data from the National Center for Education Statistics) are Village Elementary School with 805 students in grades PreK–3, Indian Hill School with 623 students in grades 4–6, William R. Satz Middle School with 493 students in grades 7–8 and Holmdel High School with 960 students in grades 9–12.

Holmdel High School was the 12th-ranked public high school in New Jersey out of 339 schools statewide in New Jersey Monthly magazine's September 2012 cover story on the state's "Top Public High Schools", after being ranked 13th in 2012 out of 328 schools listed. The high school was ranked 20th in the state of New Jersey and number 723 overall by The Washington Post in its 2011 ranking of American high schools.

Holmdel High School became the center of a scandal due to a hazing incident at a football camp in 1988 that was reported in the press and received considerable notoriety.

Private schools within the township include the Roman Catholic Diocese of Trenton's St. John Vianney High School for grades 9–12 and St. Benedict School, a kindergarten through eighth grade Catholic school that feeds into St. John Vianney. Holmdel was home to the now-defunct New School High School of Monmouth County, an alternative school based on the British Integrated Method, in which students in grades K–8 spend three years in a "family" that covers three grades in a traditional school program.

== Infrastructure ==
=== Public safety ===
Formally established in 1966, the Holmdel Township Police Department traces its origins to a part-time constable hired in 1947 who was named as the first police chief in 1952.

Holmdel Fire and Rescue Company # 2 is an all-volunteer department created in 2006 that serves Holmdel and surrounding areas.

Holmdel First Aid Squad is an all-volunteer organization that responds to medical emergencies in the township. Founded in 1969, the squad responds to an average of 1,500 calls each year, with no charge for medical services or transportation.

=== Transportation ===
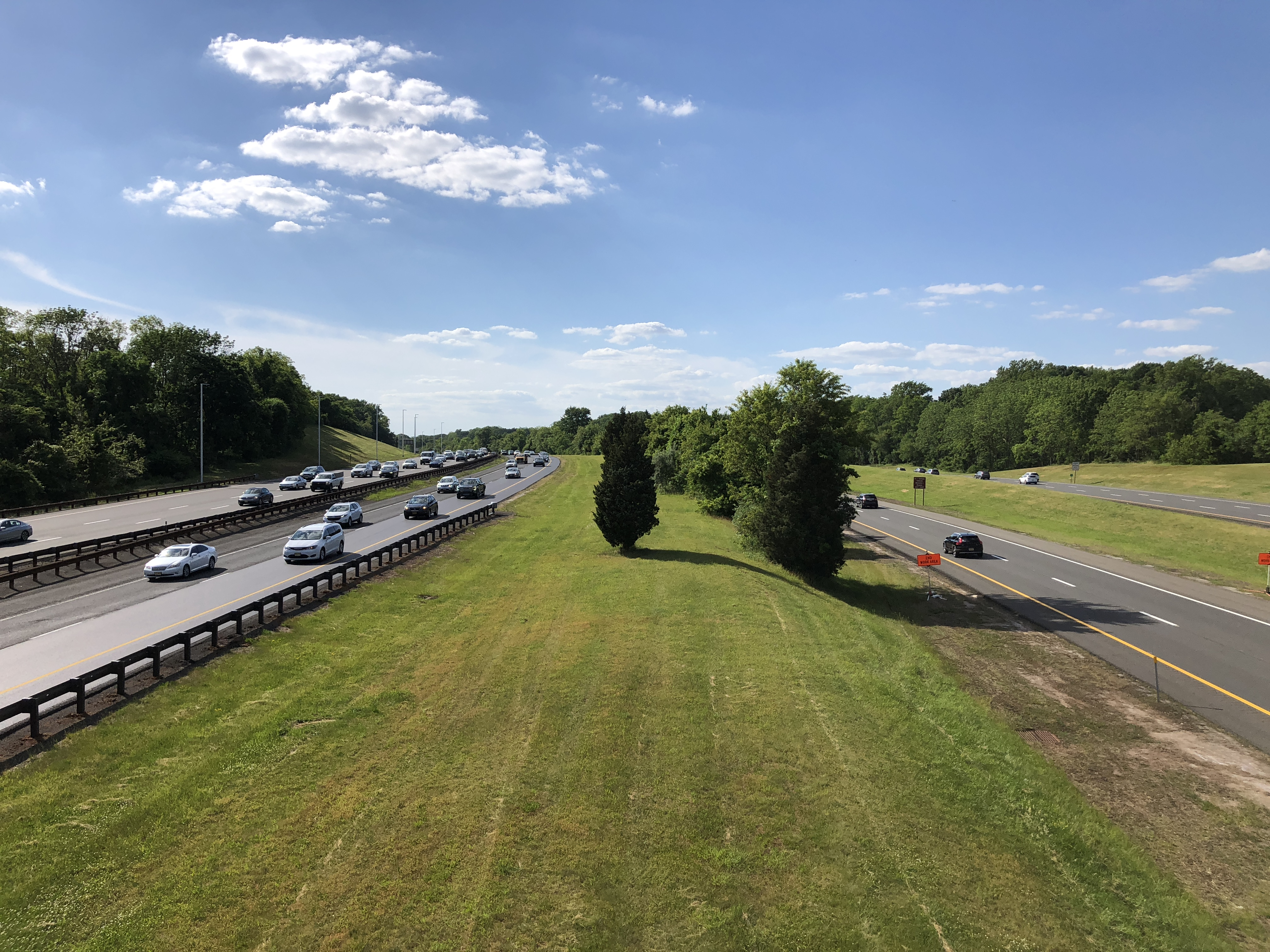
The Garden State Parkway in Holmdel

==== Roads and highways ====
As of May 2010, the township had a total of 125.28 miles (201.62 km) of roadways, of which 105.25 miles (169.38 km) were maintained by the municipality, 12.33 miles (19.84 km) by Monmouth County, 3.98 miles (6.41 km) by the New Jersey Department of Transportation and 3.72 miles (5.99 km) by the New Jersey Turnpike Authority.

A few major roads pass through the township. The Garden State Parkway passes through near the center with part of Exit 114 (the other half in Middletown) and Exit 116 (for the PNC Bank Arts Center) in Holmdel. Route 34 passes through the western part while Route 35 goes through in the northern section. Major county routes that cross through include a short stretch of CR 516 in the north and CR 520 in the south.

==== Public transportation ====
NJ Transit and Academy Bus provide service in the area.

The nearest train stops to the township are located at Aberdeen-Matawan, Hazlet, and Middletown, all along the NJ Transit's North Jersey Coast Line to Hoboken, Newark Penn Station, and New York Penn Station.

Ferry service is available through the Seastreak service in nearby Highlands, about a 15-20 minute drive from Holmdel. SeaStreak offers ferry service to New York City with trips to Pier 11 (on the East River at Wall Street) and East 35th Street in Manhattan. The ferry service also offers seasonal travel, such as to the public beaches on Sandy Hook, baseball games at Yankee Stadium and Citi Field, trips to Broadway matinees, Martha's Vineyard in Massachusetts, college football games at West Point, fall foliage in the Hudson Valley, and to the Macy's Thanksgiving Day Parade, among other excursions.

=== Healthcare ===
Bayshore Medical Center is a regional hospital located in the township. Serving the greater Raritan Bayshore region, the hospital is a partner of Hackensack Meridian Health and is affiliated with Rutgers Robert Wood Johnson Medical School. The facility has 169 beds and currently offers cardiac catheterization, diagnostic Imaging, medical/surgical, behavioral health, emergency, laboratory and transitional care. In 2021 it was given a grade A by the Leapfrog patient safety organization. Other regional hospitals near the township include Riverview Medical Center in nearby Red Bank and Raritan Bay Medical Center, with divisions in Perth Amboy and Old Bridge, both hospitals are also part of Hackensack Meridian.

Located in neighboring Middletown is Memorial Sloan Kettering Cancer Center. Originally founded in New York City in 1884, it is the oldest cancer treatment and research center in the world. The Memorial Sloan Kettering Cancer Center of Monmouth County is the first center outside of the main center in Manhattan to offer outpatient surgery.

The closest major university hospitals to the township are located at Jersey Shore University Medical Center in Neptune and Robert Wood Johnson University Hospital in New Brunswick.

== Notable people ==
People who were born in, residents of, or otherwise closely associated with Holmdel Township include:

- Henry E. Ackerson Jr. (1880–1970), Justice of the New Jersey Supreme Court from 1948 to 1952
- David F. Bauman, New Jersey Superior Court judge
- John Burke (born 1971), former professional football player, New England Patriots, New York Jets and San Diego Chargers
- John Cannon (born 1960), former defensive end who played nine seasons for the Tampa Bay Buccaneers
- Dominick Casola (born 1987), race car driver who made starts in NASCAR and the ARCA Menards Series from 2006 to 2013
- Herbert Cohen (born 1940), Olympic fencer
- Robert Cooke (1880–1960), immunologist and allergist
- Sean Davis (born 1993), professional soccer player for the New York Red Bulls of Major League Soccer
- Christopher Dell (born 1956), diplomat who served as U.S. Ambassador to Kosovo, Zimbabwe and Angola
- Serena DiMaso (born 1963), politician who served as mayor of Holmdel Township and has represented the 13th Legislative District in the New Jersey General Assembly 2018-2021
- John J. Ely (1778–1852), member of the New Jersey General Assembly
- Abram P. Fardon (1837–1913), city council member of Washington, D.C.
- S. Thomas Gagliano (1931–2019), politician who served in the New Jersey Senate from 1978 to 1989
- Renzo Gracie (born 1967), professional mixed martial arts fighter from Brazil
- Brian Hanlon, sculptor
- William Barclay Harding (1906–1967), financier who served as chairman of the board of Smith, Barney Co. until his death
- Pete Hegseth (born 1980), Fox News contributor, Bronze Star Medal recipient
- John Henry Heyer (1831–1905), politician
- Jennifer Farley (born 1986), MTV television personality and entrepreneur
- Jodi Kantor (born 1975), reporter for The New York Times and author of The Obamas
- Alisa Kresge (born 1985), former basketball player who is the head coach of the Richmond Spiders women's basketball team
- Lynja (1956–2024), celebrity chef who was best known for her viral TikTok and YouTube Shorts videos
- Dan Metzger (born 1993), professional soccer player who plays as a midfielder for Memphis 901 FC in the USL Championship
- Quenton Nelson (born 1996), offensive guard for the Indianapolis Colts
- Matt O'Ree (born 1972), blues-rock guitarist, singer and songwriter
- Michael V. Pomarico (born 1955; class of 1974), six-time Emmy Award winner for his work on the ABC-TV daytime drama All My Children
- Tab Ramos (born 1966), retired football midfielder who played on the U.S. Olympic team and was the first player to sign with Major League Soccer, where he played seven years with the MetroStars
- Bob Roggy (1956–1986), athlete who set the American javelin throw record in the early 1980s
- Lorene Scafaria (born 1978), screenwriter, playwright, actress, singer, and director who wrote, co-produced, and directed the 2009 film Hustlers
- Julie Shah (born 1982), engineer who is Department Head of Aeronautics and Astronautics at the Massachusetts Institute of Technology
- Neel Shah (born 1982), physician who is Chief Medical Officer of Maven Clinic
- John Conover Smock (1842–1926), geologist
- Julie Sokolow (born 1987), lo-fi singer-songwriter, writer, and independent filmmaker
- Michael Sorrentino (born 1982), MTV television personality and entrepreneur
- Anthony Spalliero (1942–2010), real estate developer with organized crime ties
- Bruce Springsteen (born 1949), singer-songwriter
- Felicia Stoler, host of Honey, We're Killing the Kids on The Learning Channel
- John H. Tilelli Jr. (born 1941), retired United States Army four-star general
- John Valentin (born 1967), infielder who played for the Boston Red Sox and New York Mets
- Robert Woodrow Wilson (born 1936), awarded the Nobel Prize in Physics in 1978
- Joe Yeninas (1934–2020), cartoonist and illustrator for the Newark Evening News, the Associated Press and The Journal of Commerce
- Harold A. Zahl (1905–1973), director of research at Camp Evans (later Fort Monmouth), responsible for critical U.S. developments in radar technology during World War II

== Points of interest ==
- Bell Labs Holmdel Complex – Now occupied by Spirent Communications and Suttons International, the buildings were constructed by architects Eero Saarinen and Sasaki, Walker and Associates from 1957 to 1962. The complex contained 2,000,000 square feet (190,000 m^{2}) of space for its 6,000 employees, where five Nobel laureates and other Bell Labs staff developed many advances in communications technology in the facility that stands on a site that covers 472 acres (191 ha).
- Holmes-Hendrickson House – listed on the National Register of Historic Places, the home was constructed by William Holmes in the mid 1750s in the Dutch vernacular style.
- Upper Meeting House of the Baptist Church of Middletown is the state's first Baptist congregation, established in 1688, with its current building constructed in 1809. It is now part of the Holmdel Community Church, after a merger with the Holmdel Dutch Reformed Church, established in 1699 and constructed in 1838.
- Vietnam Era Museum & Educational Center – The Vietnam Era Museum & Educational Center opened in 1998 and is located adjacent to the New Jersey Vietnam Veterans Memorial. The museum facility covers 5,000 square feet (460 m^{2}) and was constructed at a cost of $3.5 million, opening as the first facility of its kind, intended to provide an even-handed depiction of the Vietnam War based on the experience of those who fought in Vietnam and those who remained in the United States.
- Kovenhoven (1700) and Old Kentuck (1770) are historic homes dating to the 18th century, which have been added to the National Register of Historic Places.
- Holmdel Cemetery & Mausoleum – This cemetery has been serving Monmouth County residents since 1871. The property spans more than 10 acres (4.0 ha) and includes six mausoleums.
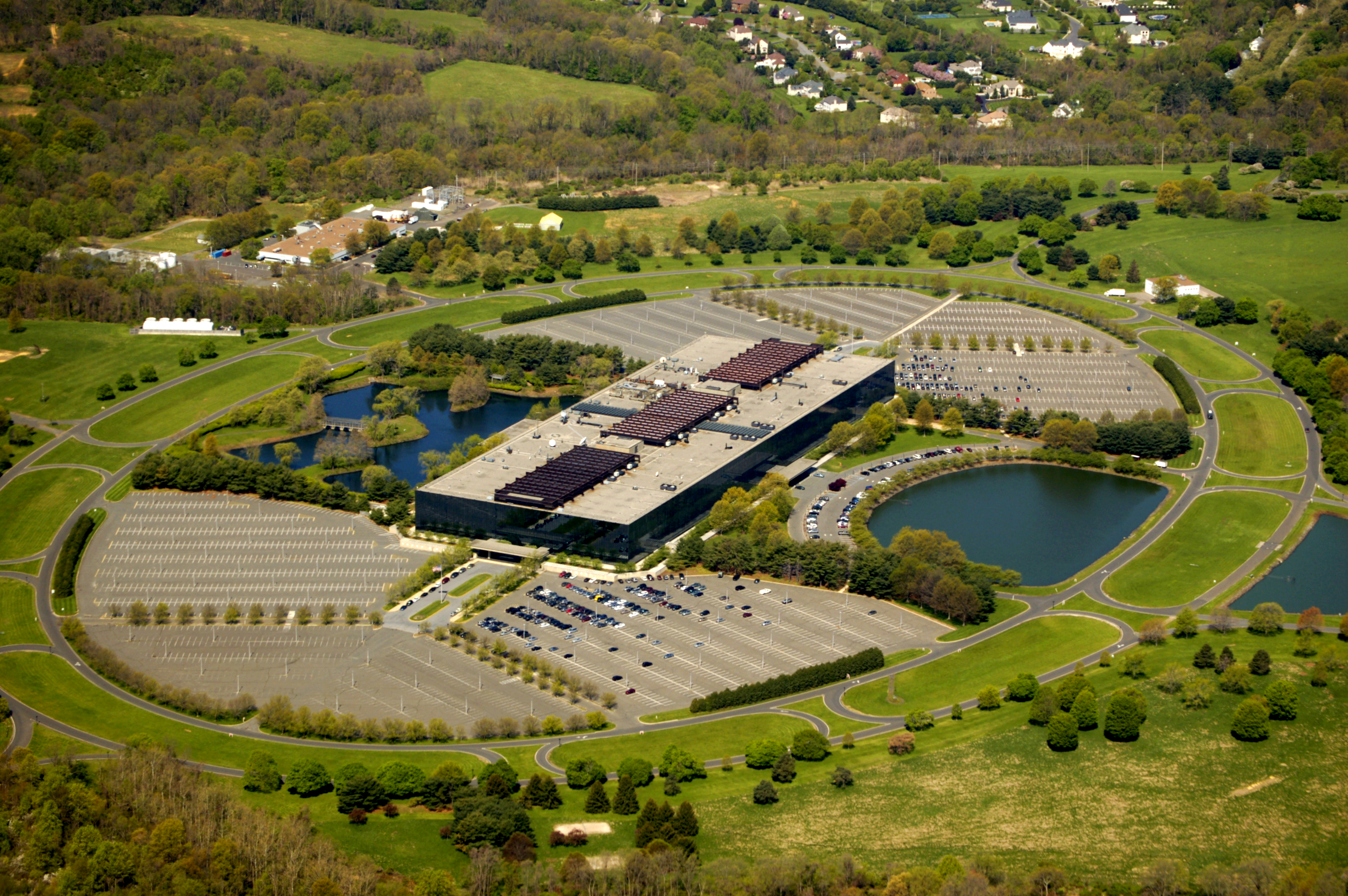
Aerial view of Bell Labs

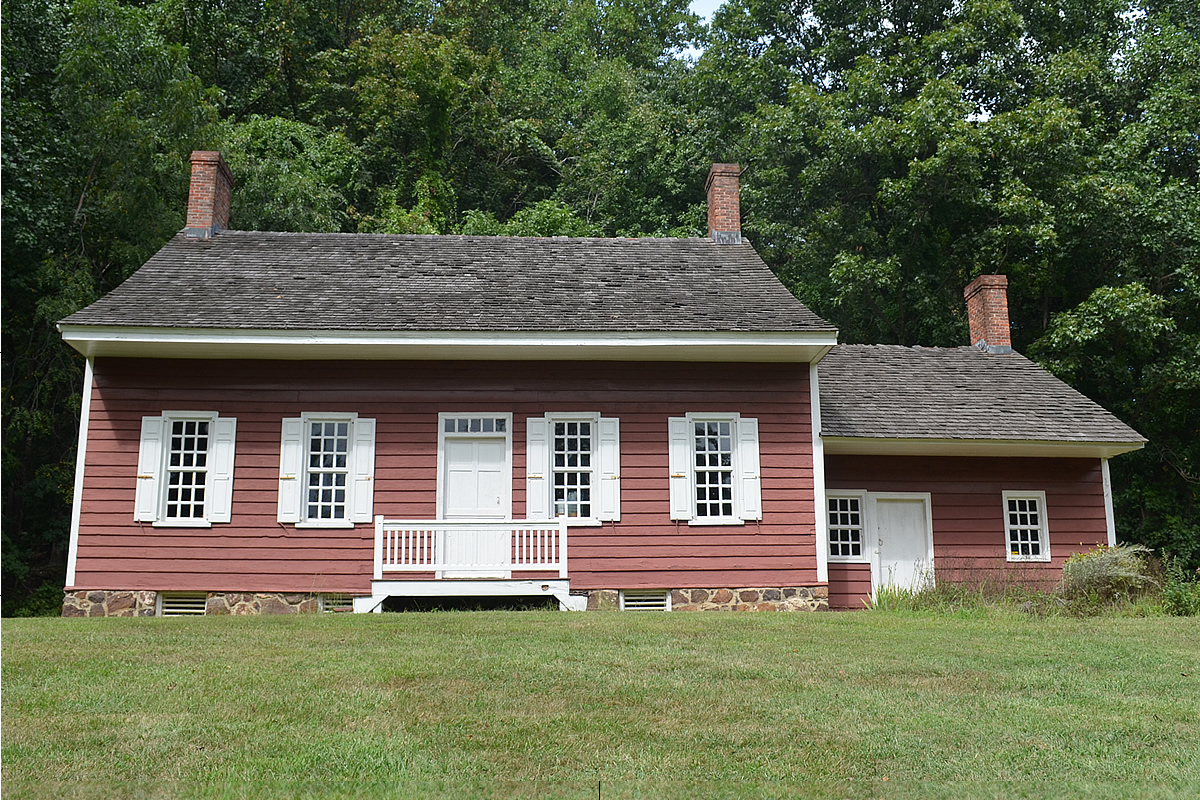
The Holmes–Hendrickson House, 2014

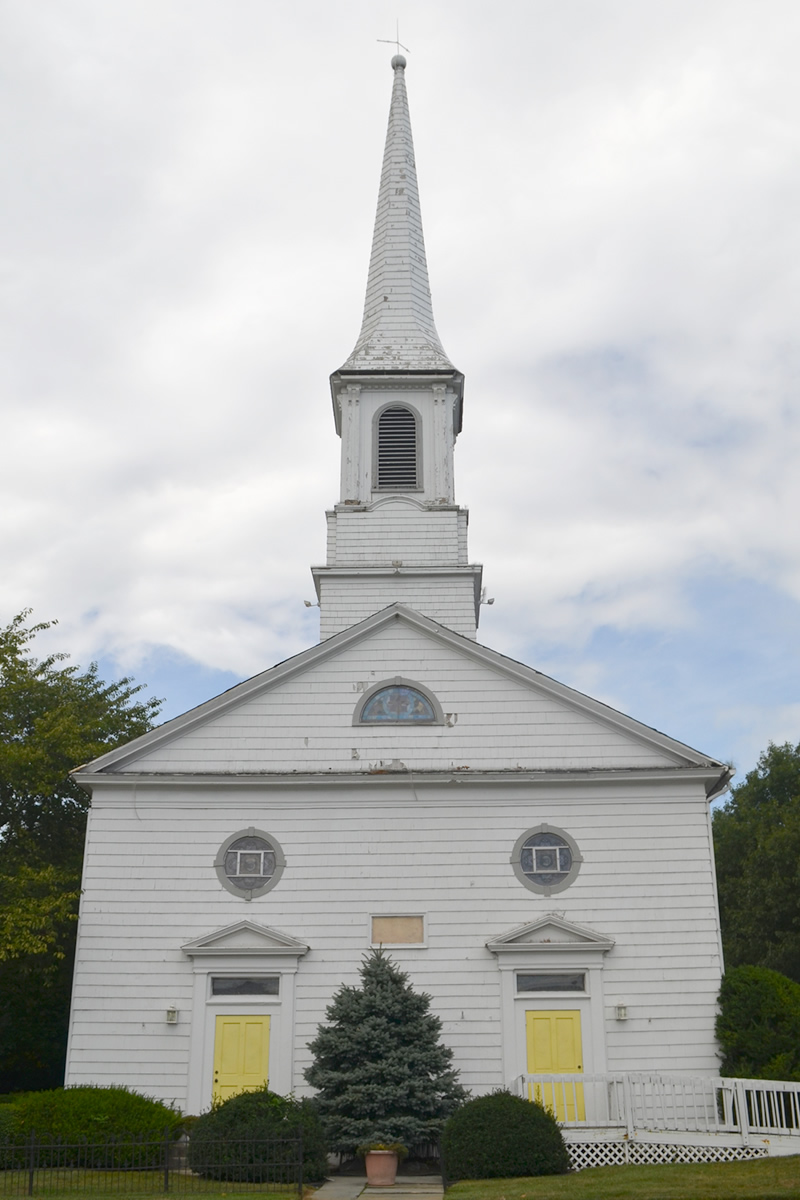
Holmdel Dutch Reformed Church, built 1838

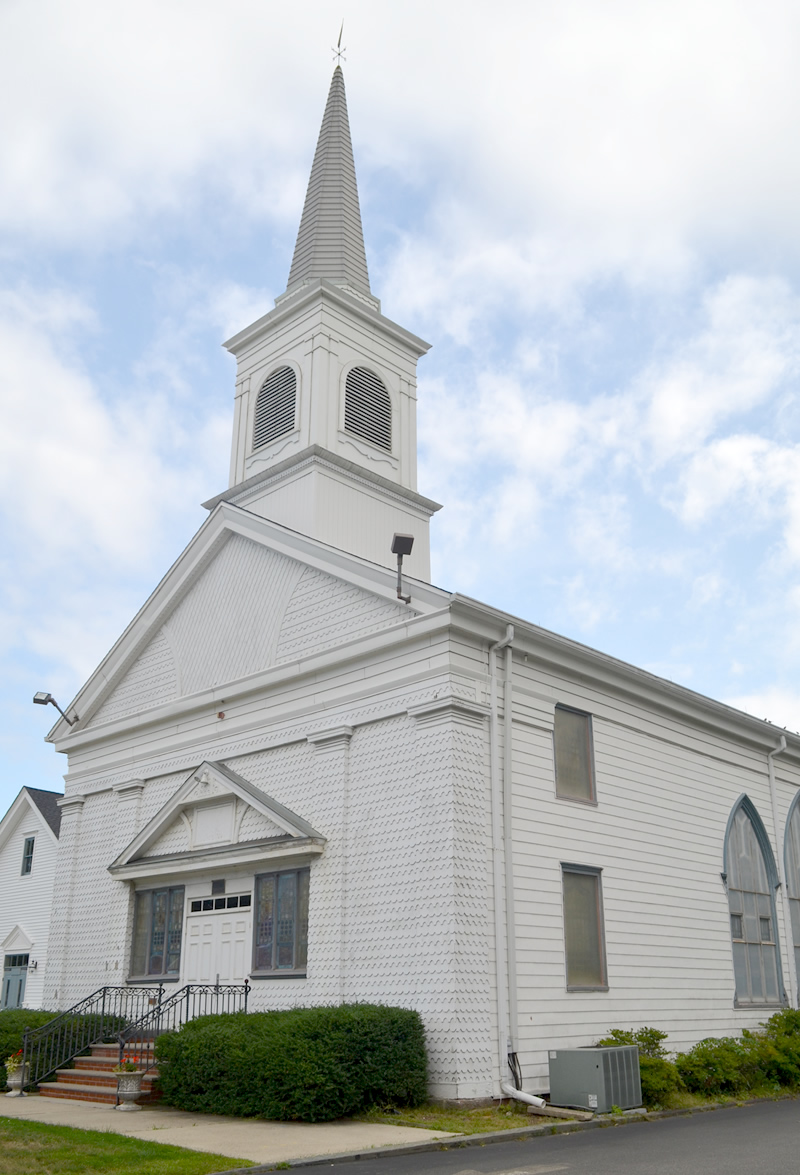
Upper Meeting House of the Baptist Church now known as Holmdel Community Church of the UCC, built 1809

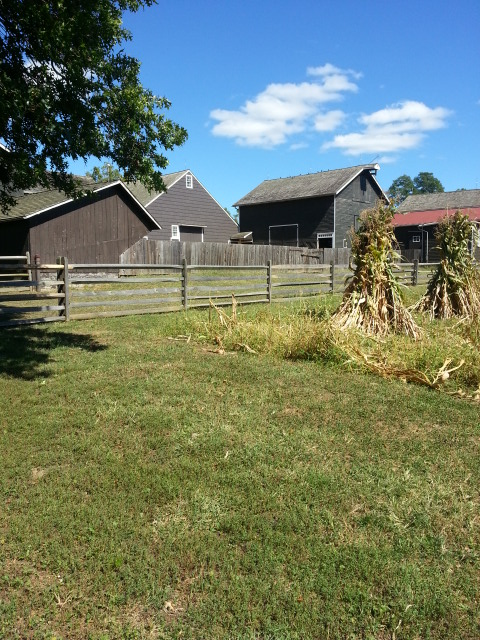
The historic Longstreet Farm at Holmdel Park, 2013

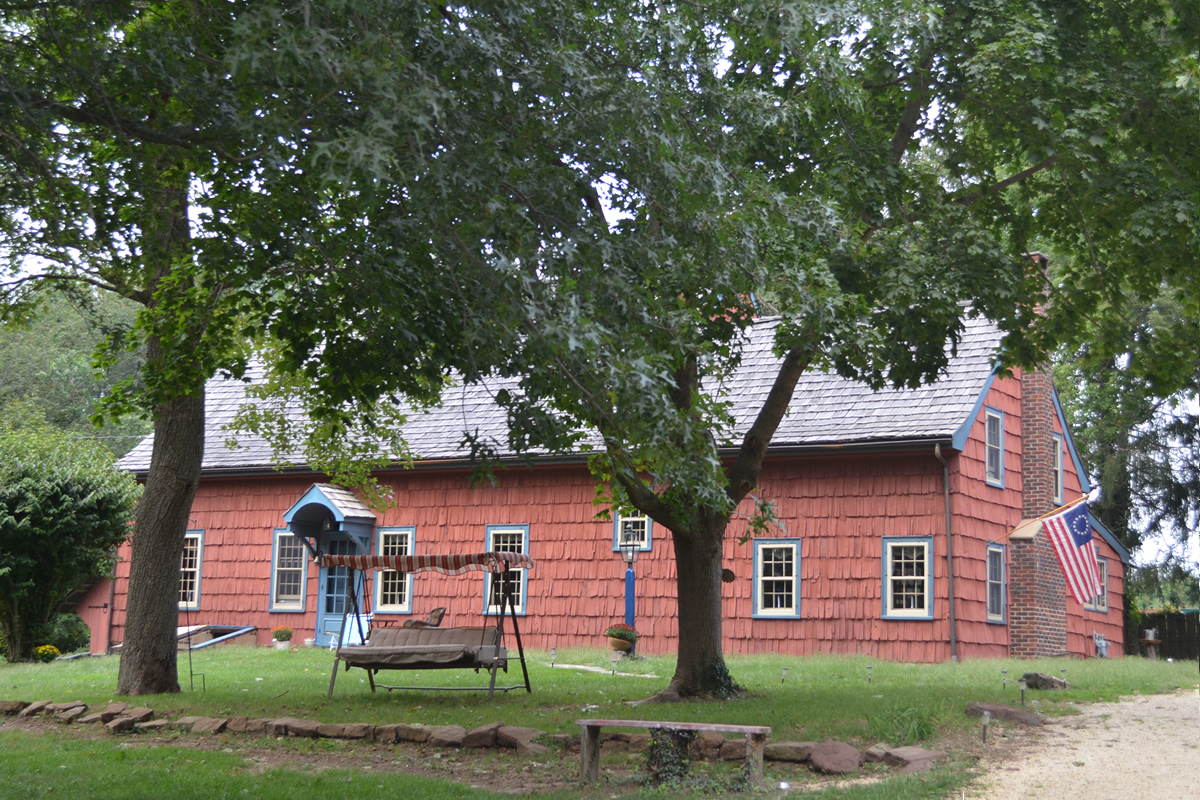
The Kovenhoven House, 2014

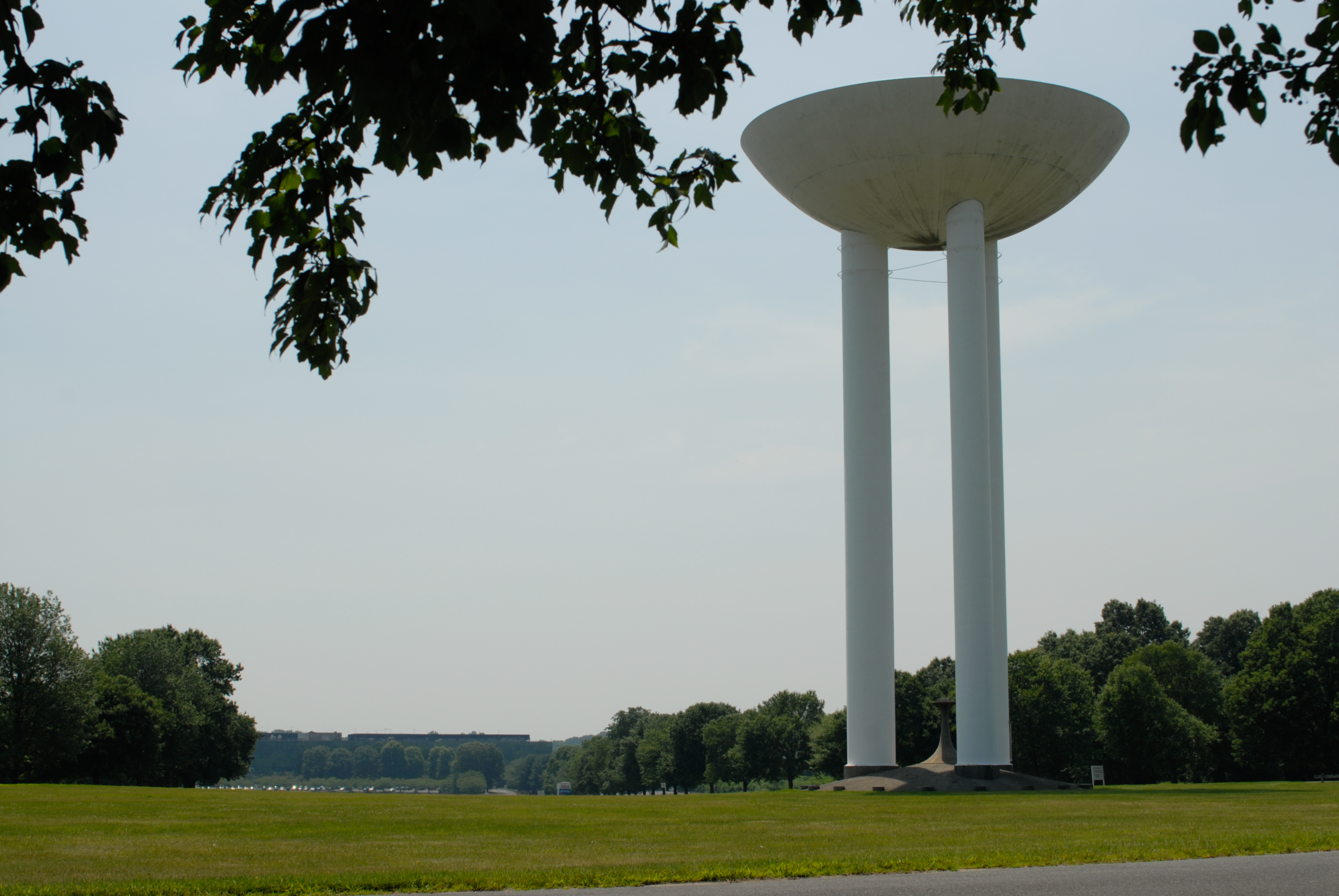
AT&T Holmdel and water tower
