= Granian =

- Origin: Holmdel Township, New Jersey
- Genre: Rock
- Years active: 1995–2006
- Spinoffs: Kill the Alarm
- Past members: Garen Gueyikian; George Schultz; Chris Nicoletti; Anthony Fazioli; Tim Shahady; Adam Braun; Tony Maceli; Graycon Legere; Nathan Fox
- Website: www.granian.com

Granian is an acoustic/electric rock band led by Garen Gueyikian.

Granian was founded in 1995 in Holmdel Township, New Jersey, where Gueyikian initially used the name Grane but changed to Granian over possible copyright concerns. Gueyikian's initial lineup consisted of George Schultz on bass and backing vocals, Chris Nicoletti on acoustic guitar and backing vocals, and Anthony Fazioli on drums. Fazioli left in 1996 and was replaced by Tim Shahady; Nicoletti left in 1998, after which the group worked as a trio.

In 2000, Schultz left the group, and Adam Braun and Tony Maceli both did stints in the group on bass. Shahady departed soon after, and Graycon Legere took over on drums, while Nathan Fox took over on bass. Gueyikian later performed by himself as Granian, for the 2002 release Live Sessions through 2005. He used the name interchangeably for solo shows and for those with a backing band of available musicians. The group played a benefit concert for Armenian victims of genocide in 2004. In 2006 Gueyikian began a new project, Kill the Alarm.

The group released four albums and one EP (2004's My Voice), and toured with Matchbox 20, Guster, Dispatch, Howie Day, Pat McGee Band and O.A.R, among others. SPIN called the group "the country's best unsigned band" early in its career.

Granian's third studio album, "On My Own Two Feet", was produced by Mike Shimshack, and features Nir Z (John Mayer, Jason Mraz, Genesis) on drums. It received generally positive reviews. The album reached #1 on both CDBaby.com and Awarestore.com and the group's five independently released albums have sold over 35,000 copies to date.

Garen has since recorded under the new band, Kill the Alarm.

== Discography ==
- Without Change, 1996
- Hang Around, 2000
- Live Sessions, 2003
- My Voice (EP), 2004
- On My Own Two Feet, 2004
- Alternate Mixes, 2006
