= Upper Meeting House of the Baptist Church of Middletown =

Historic church in New Jersey, United States

- U.S. National Register of Historic Places
- New Jersey Register of Historic Places
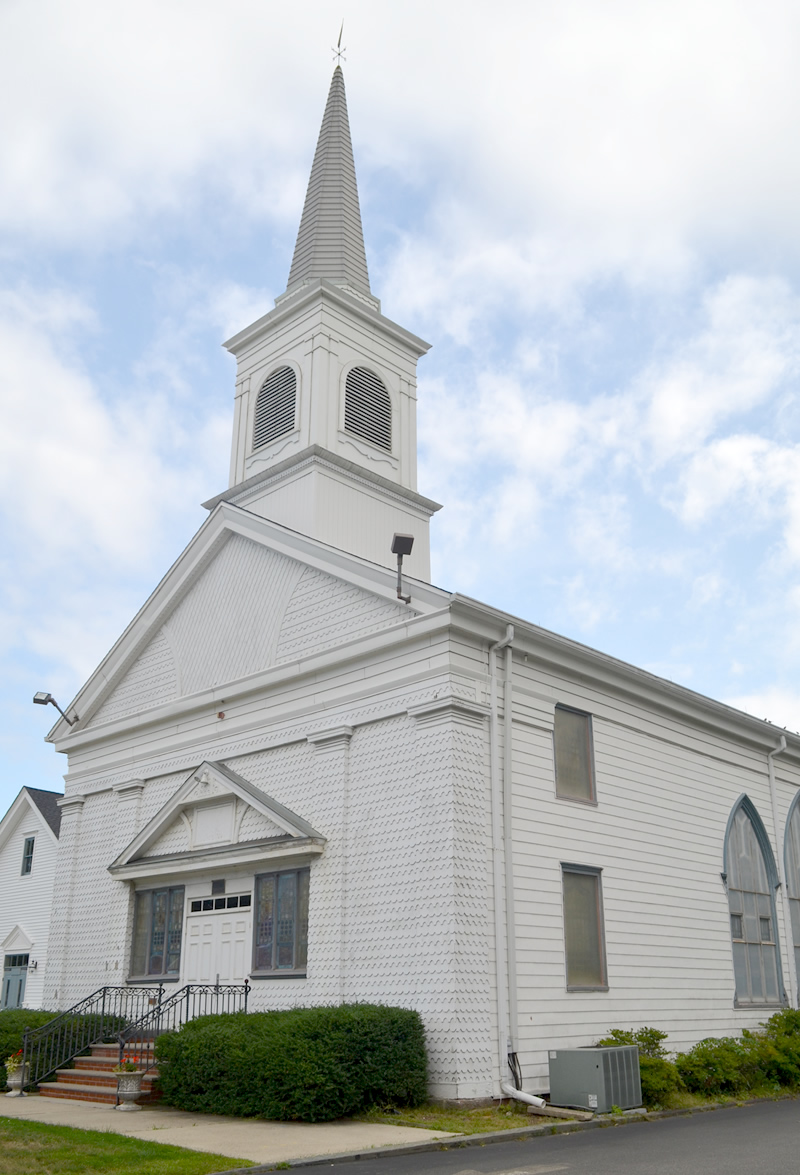

- Location within Monmouth County, New Jersey Location within New Jersey Location within the United States
- Location: 40 Main Street, Holmdel Township, New Jersey
- Coordinates: 40°20′41″N 74°11′11″W
- Area: 4.8 acres (1.9 ha)
- Built: 1809
- Architectural style: Gothic
- NRHP reference No.: 87002573
- NJRHP No.: 1987

Significant dates
- Added to NRHP: December 7, 1990
- Designated NJRHP: December 3, 1987

The Upper Meeting House of the Baptist Church of Middletown, also known as the Holmdel Community Church, is located at 40 Main Street in Holmdel Township in Monmouth County, New Jersey, United States. It was the first Baptist church congregation in New Jersey. The historic church was added to the National Register of Historic Places on December 7, 1990, for its significance in architecture.

The Holmdel Community Church congregation was formed as a result of a twentieth century merger between the Middletown Baptist Church and the Dutch Reformed Congregation. The Baptist congregation was founded in 1688 by Baptists from Rhode Island and was known as Upper Meeting; it shared a minister with Lower Meeting, the other Baptist congregation in the area, which is now known as Old First Church in Middletown. The first church building on the current site of Holmdel Community Church was constructed in 1705, and the current church building was constructed in 1809 (with later additions). The Dutch Reformed congregation was originally located nearby and was founded in 1699. It was previously known as the Middletown Church of the Navesink, and later as the Dutch Reformed Church of Freehold and Middletown.

== See also ==
- National Register of Historic Places listings in Monmouth County, New Jersey
