= Holmdel Dutch Reformed Church =

Historic church in New Jersey, United States

- U.S. National Register of Historic Places
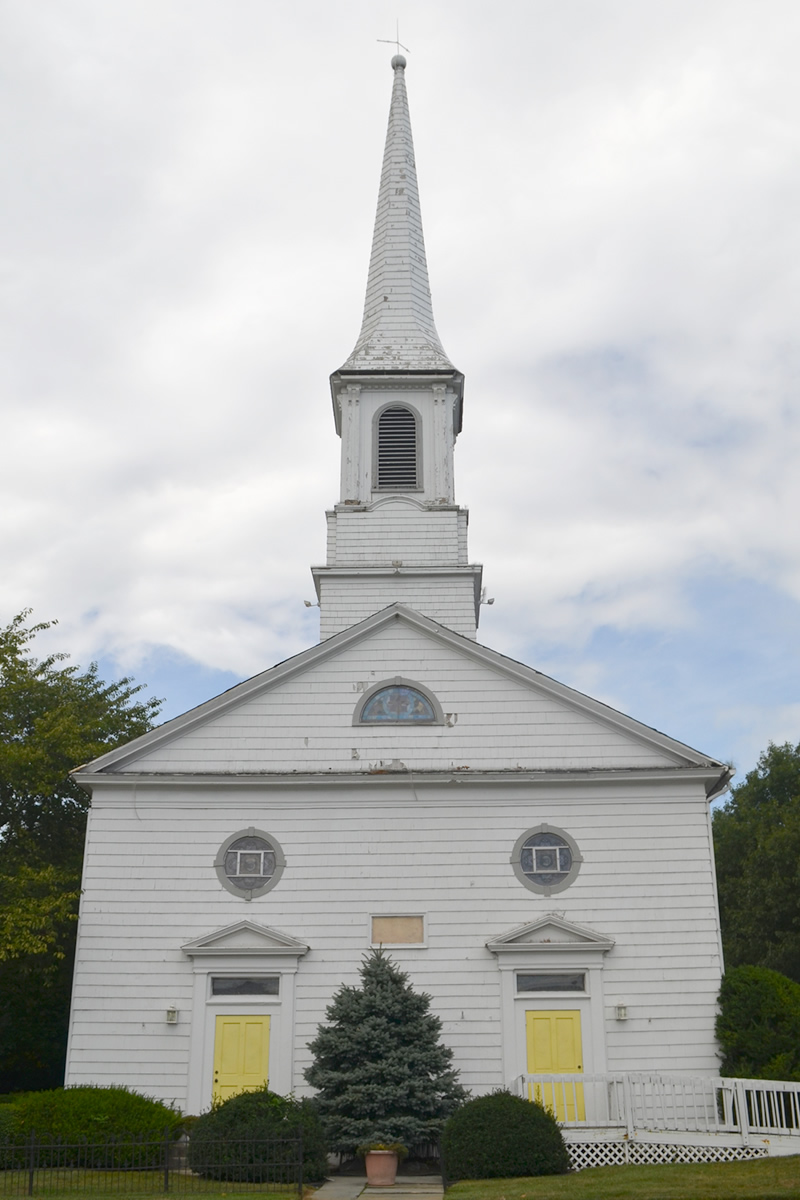

- Location within Monmouth County, New Jersey Location within New Jersey Location within the United States
- Location: 41 Main Street, Holmdel Township, New Jersey
- Coordinates: 40°20′43″N 74°11′4″W
- Area: 0.7 acres (0.28 ha)
- Built: 1838
- Architectural style: Greek Revival
- NRHP reference No.: 80002506
- Added to NRHP: October 22, 1980

Holmdel Dutch Reformed Church is a historic church at 41 Main Street in Holmdel Township, Monmouth County, New Jersey, United States.

The Greek Revival building was constructed in 1838 and added to the National Register of Historic Places in 1980. Today, the church building houses offices for Weichert Realtors.

== See also ==
- National Register of Historic Places listings in Monmouth County, New Jersey
