= Holmdel Park =

Park in New Jersey, United States

Coordinates: 40°22′30.21″N 74°11′9.12″W

- Holmdel Arboretum, Longstreet Farm
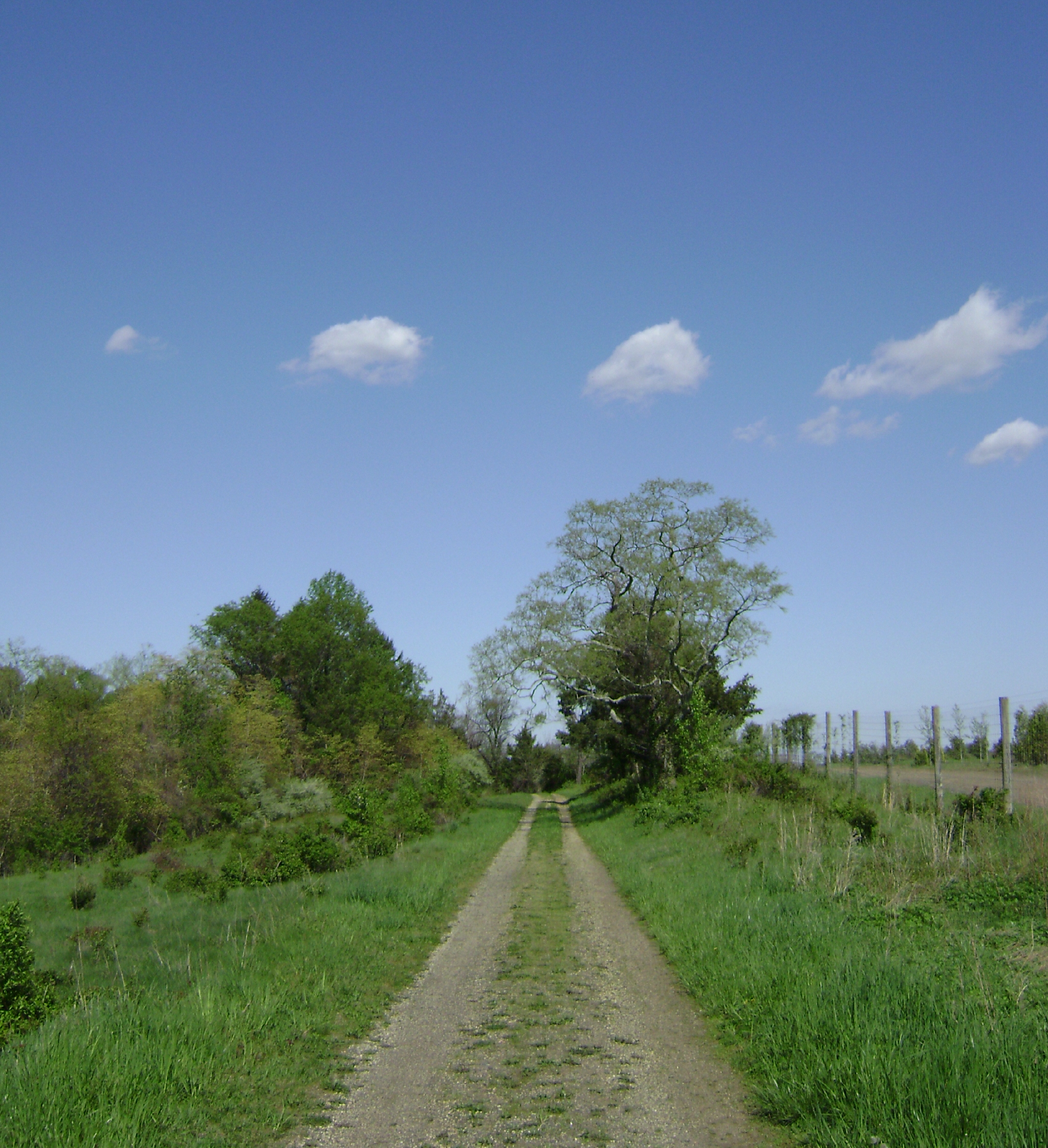
- Steeplechase Trail in the Ramanessin Section of Holmdel Park in late April 2011
- Interactive map of Holmdel Park
- Type: Suburban park
- Location: Monmouth County in New Jersey
- Area: 664 acres (269 ha)
- Created: 1962
- Operator: Monmouth County Park System
- Visitors: 1,096,379 (2021)
- Open: Open daily from 7am until dusk
- Status: Open
- Website: Holmdel Park - Monmouth County Park System

Holmdel Park is located in Holmdel Township, New Jersey and is part of the Monmouth County Park System. The initial park land was established in 1962, with an additional 227 acres (92 ha) section added in 2001. Holmdel Park is also the home of the Holmdel Arboretum; aka, David C. Shaw Arboretum and the Longstreet Farm, a living history farm set in the 1890s. The park is a popular destination for local elementary school trips and cross-country runners.

In August 2017, it was announced that a further 71 acres (29 ha) was being donated. Then in 2018, it obtained an additional 52 acres of land.

== Activities and facilities ==
The park's recreational offerings include fishing (with a permit), individual and group picnic areas, tennis courts, playgrounds, and 10 miles of hiking trails. Ice skating and sledding are permitted when conditions are deemed safe for guests.

The park contains four distinct visitor areas, each with its own parking; three are accessed via the main park entrance while the fourth is located at the activity center further north on Longstreet Road.

The Pond View area provides access to the arboretum, Historic Longstreet Farm, Upper and Lower ponds and the shelter building; the shelter building also houses a seasonal concession. The Forest Ridge area provides access to group picnic areas, trails and activity fields; the Forest Ridge parking lot also acts as an overflow lot for the Pond View area. The Hill Top area as the name implies is located at the top of a fairly steep hill; this area provides parking for the parks tennis courts as well as access to additional trails. The Activity Center provides indoor facilities for scheduled county sponsored activities.

== Historic Longstreet Farm ==
Historic Longstreet Farm is a living history farm that recreates agricultural life of the 1890s. Interpreters dress in period clothing and perform typical year round farming and domestic activities, including seasonal planting and harvesting of crops and raising livestock. The farm is listed on the National Register of Historic Places, as well as the Holmes-Hendrickson House located on the farm. The farm was purchased by the Monmouth County Park System in 1967 to preserve the county's rural past. The farm opened to the public in 1972 as Historic Longstreet Farm.

Historic Longstreet Farm is a fairly complete example of a typical nineteenth-century farm created by Dutch settlers in New Jersey. The farmstead consists of a 14-room Federal-style farmhouse, a Dutch barn, and a collection of nineteenth-century farm outbuildings.

Historic Longstreet Farm is open daily year-round, free of charge.

== David C. Shaw Arboretum ==
The David C. Shaw Arboretum is a 20-acre (8.1 ha) horticultural display created by the Monmouth County Shade Tree Commission. The arboretum was created in 1963 and is named for a former superintendent. The arboretum initially started with 87 trees but now boasts nearly 3000 specimens. The arboretum was designed by landscape architect and taxonomist Robert B. Clark, professor of Ornamental Horticulture at Rutgers University.

== Trails ==
The park hosts a dozen trails of varying lengths and difficulties.

=== North Section ===
==== Hilltop ====
- Cross Country Trail 3.1 miles (5 km)
- High Point Trail 0.6 mile (1 km) loop

==== Marsh ====
- Marsh Trail 0.8 mile (1.3 km) features long boardwalks over marshy areas and trails for wildlife viewing

==== Hill ====
- Beech Glen 0.5 mile (0.8 km)
- Ridge Walk 1.2 mile (1.9 km) loop
- Fitness trail 0.8 mile (1.3 km)

==== Plain ====
- Paved Trail 0.5 mile (0.8 km) circles the field between the Longstreet Farm, the Upper and Lower Ponds, and picnic areas.
- Pond Walk 0.4 mile (0.6 km) circles the Lower Pond.

=== Ramanessin Section ===
- Ramanessin Trail 2.1 miles (3.3 km)
- Steeplechase Trail 1.4 mile (2.2 km)

The Homestead and Fern trails provide short (0.25 mile (0.4 km)) connections between the above two trails
