= PNC Bank Arts Center =

Outdoor theater in Holmdel Township, New Jersey, United States

- Interactive map of PNC Bank Arts Center
- Former names: Garden State Arts Center (1968-96)
- Address: Exit 116, Garden State Parkway; Holmdel, NJ 07733-1974
- Coordinates: 40.393414°N 74.175562°W
- Owner: New Jersey Turnpike Authority
- Operator: Live Nation
- Capacity: 17,500
- Type: Amphitheater

Construction
- Built: 1964–1968
- Opened: June 12, 1968
- Expanded: 1996
- Cost: $6.75 million
- Architect: Edward Durell Stone

Website
- Venue Website

The PNC Bank Arts Center (originally the Garden State Arts Center) is an amphitheatre in Holmdel, New Jersey. About 17,500 people can occupy the venue; there are 7,000 seats and the grass area can hold about 10,500 people. Concerts are from May through September featuring 45-50 different events of many types of musical styles. It is ranked among the top five most successful amphitheatres in the country. It is one of two major outdoor arenas in the New York City Metropolitan Area, along with Jones Beach Theater on Long Island. Both venues are managed by Live Nation.

== History ==
The amphitheatre was originally called the Garden State Arts Center. The 1954 legislation that created the Garden State Parkway (at whose Exit 116 the Arts Center is located) also called for recreational facilities along the Parkway's route, and in 1964 Holmdel's Telegraph Hill was chosen as the site for "a cultural and recreational center ... that would be developed as a center for music and the performing arts." The amphitheatre was designed by noted modernist architect Edward Durell Stone and featured open sides covered by a 200-foot (61 m), saucer-like roof supported by eight large concrete pillars. It featured seating for 5,197 people with space for about 5,000 more on the lawn area outside the roof. The facility is most easily accessible from the Parkway.

The Garden State Arts Center opened on June 12, 1968, with a program featuring pianist Van Cliburn, conductor Eugene Ormandy, and the Philadelphia Orchestra. The Arts Center was operated in conjunction with the New Jersey Highway Authority, which also ran the Parkway. On June 25 and 26, 1968, Judy Garland performed at this facility.

In the beginning, the Arts Center's programming featured a good deal of classical as well as popular music. In addition, a number of free daytime programs were provided for schoolchildren, senior citizens, and the disadvantaged and disabled. Beginning in 1971, the non-profit Foundation associated with the Arts Center also sponsored International Heritage Festivals before and after the regular season focusing on ethnicities such as Scottish, Slovak, German, Polish, African American, etc.; due to lack of attendance, these festivals were discontinued in 2015.

During off-season months the Arts Center is generally unused, except for a Holiday Light Spectacular show during the Christmas season. A banquet hall is on premises but has not been occupied since 2013. In 1995, the Arts Center grounds saw the addition of the New Jersey Vietnam Veterans' Memorial.

=== Renaming and expansion ===
During the 1990s the philosophy of the Arts Center underwent a change. Classical music was almost completely phased out, and the venue's management wanted to expand the venue to compete against other, larger amphitheatres on the summer outdoor concert circuit. Before the 1996 season, a substantial expansion added 2,000 seats (some now outside the roof, which was not altered) and doubled the lawn capacity by removing rows of trees and a surrounding walk and raising the bank around the facility much higher.

In 1996, PNC Bank, a Pittsburgh-based bank, purchased naming rights for $8.5 million over a 10-year period. In 1998, as a result of the name change, and despite negotiations to keep the words "Garden State" in the new name, state Senators Joe Kyrillos and John O. Bennett introduced and passed legislation to remove all state funds from any PNC Bank accounts and redeposit them in other banks within the state, arguing that as a piece of New Jersey's heritage, its name ought not to be "commercialized".

== Holiday Light Spectacular ==
PNC Bank Arts Center features one of the most extravagant drive through light displays in the tri-state area. The spectacular is a 2.5-mile (4.0 km) drive through a forest of lights. Over 5 million lights were used over 225 displays and usually runs from the end of November through January 2. The display is set up in the parking lot around the Arts Center on a specially prepared road. In the premises of the light spectacular, a radio station plays Christmas carols as well as a Winter Village at the end of the display which features a snack bar, ice rink, and a Christmas decoration shop which sells smaller replicas of the displays in the light spectacular. Some large displays which are not visible from the parking lot or the amphitheater are left at their respective spots permanently. In 2008, it was announced the display would be discontinued, however, after a 7-year hiatus, the display returned for the 2014-2015 holiday season.

== Performers and performances ==
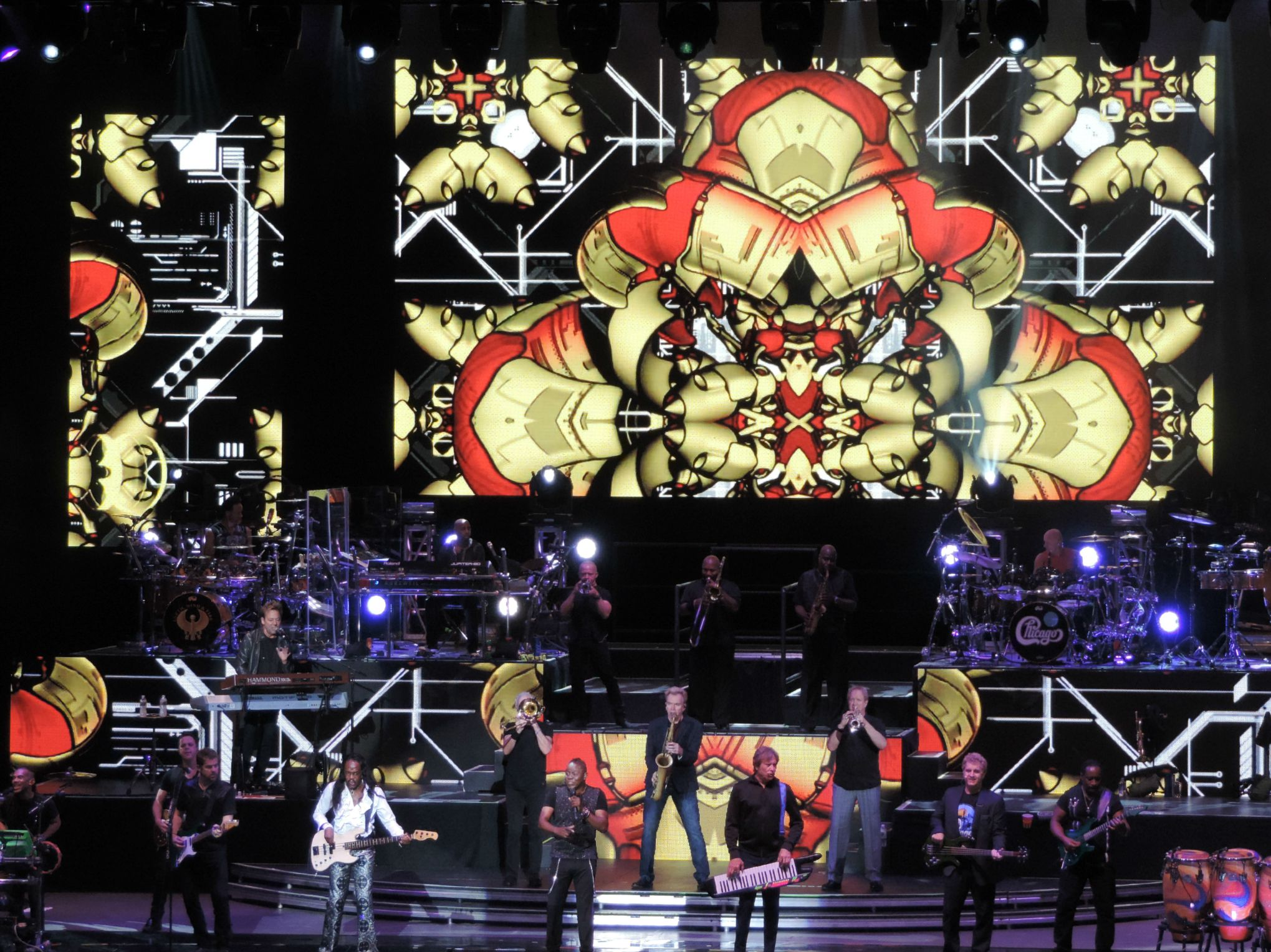
Earth, Wind & Fire performs at PNC Bank Arts Center in August 2015 (Credit: slgckgc on Creative Commons)

Perhaps the most popular performer at the Arts Center over the years has been James Taylor, who has appeared there most years (exceptions being 1998, 2000, 2002, 2004, 2006, 2007, consecutively from 2009 to 2011, 2013, consecutively from 2015 to 2020 – the 2020 appearance being postponed to 2021, 2022 and 2024) and who has been one of the few acts to be booked there three nights in a row. Ironically, Bruce Springsteen, one of New Jersey's most famous musicians, had never performed at the amphitheatre (save for a 1989 walk-on, during a Ringo Starr and His All-Starr Band show), until 2006, when he played two concerts as part of the Seeger Sessions Band Tour. On July 1, 2014, he joined Beach Boy Brian Wilson onstage for "Barbara Ann" and "Surfin' U.S.A."

Glen Campbell recorded his album, entitled Glen Campbell Live, at the Arts Center on July 4, 1969. The album went to #2 on the Billboard Country Albums list and #13 on Billboard 200. The following year, Dionne Warwick hit #37 on the Billboard Hot 100 with a version of "Make It Easy on Yourself" recorded at the venue. Portions of Jackson Browne's 1977 album Running on Empty, were recorded at the amphitheatre. The Allman Brothers Band performed and recorded their show, on August 16, 1994, which a portion was later included on their live album, entitled An Evening with the Allman Brothers Band: 2nd Set.

The amphitheatre has played host to music festivals, including the Area Festival, Crüe Fest, Crüe Fest 2, the Gigantour, Lilith Fair, the Mayhem Festival, Ozzfest, Projekt Revolution, the Uproar Festival and the Vans Warped Tour.

=== Sinéad O'Connor controversy ===
Sinéad O'Connor was scheduled to perform on August 24, 1990. The practice of the venue is to play a recording of the American national anthem prior to the beginning of a featured show. O'Connor, who said she was unaware of this practice until shortly before the show was to begin, refused to go on if the anthem was played. Venue officials acquiesced to her demand and omitted the anthem, and so O'Connor performed, but they later permanently banned her. O'Connor said she had a policy of not having the national anthem of any country played before her concerts and meant "no disrespect" but that she "will not go on stage after the national anthem of a country which imposes censorship on artists. It's hypocritical and racist." The incident made tabloid headlines and O'Connor received considerable criticism, including an embargo of her songs by several U.S. radio stations. Frank Sinatra, who performed at the center the following night, said he wished he could "kick her in the ass."

=== Phish controversy ===
On June 28–29, 2000, over 70 people were arrested, in connection with two concerts by rock band Phish. After their breakup, Phish's guitarist Trey Anastasio headlined shows at PNC several times, including a 2006 performance with GRAB, which included former Phish bassist Mike Gordon. Phish returned to the venue May 31 and June 1, 2011, for a two-night stand during their summer tour, and again on July 10, 2013.

=== 2007 OzzFest incident ===
On 16 August 2007, controversy was generated as 83 attendees were arrested at the show, most of them underage, and most of them arrested prior to the 8:00 hour, reasons cited for underage drinking and distribution, and "aggressive dancing". In addition, two men died, one after ingesting significant amounts of alcohol, marijuana and cocaine.

== Underage drinking ==
On May 18, 2007, Gwen Stefani performed the opening show for the 2007 season at the venue. The show gained a lot of local media publicity due to the large amount of underage drinking that took place in the parking lot before the show and lack of police to maintain it. At least 27 people, mainly minors, were taken to two area hospitals. The venue announced a zero-tolerance policy to underage drinking, and it was also announced that for the next concert held at the arena, Fall Out Boy on June 6, between 60 and 80 state troopers would be on hand, up from the usual 10-15 and mostly undercover and plain clothed, to detain underage drinkers. Residents of the area claimed underage drinking has always been a problem at the venue, but gets worse every year.

In response to problems with underage drinking and in the wake of a number of alcohol-related injuries and deaths, drinking in the parking lots was banned at the PNC Bank Arts Center as of August 17, 2007. This policy has been since changed to allow tailgating and alcohol consumption in the parking lots for specific events.

PNC later published a list stating which events would allow tailgating; shows drawing a younger audience would have no tailgating while shows such as Kenny Chesney would allow it.

== See also ==
- List of contemporary amphitheatres
- Live Nation
- List of New Jersey music venues by capacity

== Sources ==
- Garden State Arts Center 25th Anniversary season program, 1992.
