= New Jersey Vietnam Veterans' Memorial =

American military memorial monument

- United States
- For New Jersey veterans of the Vietnam War
- Established: 1995
- Location: 40.38922°N 74.17551°W; 1 Memorial Lane, Holmdel, New Jersey
- Website: https://www.njvvmf.org/

The New Jersey Vietnam Veterans' Memorial in Holmdel Township, New Jersey is a monument honoring New Jersey natives who served in the Vietnam War, especially the 1,565 men and one woman who lost their lives or went missing in action. Dedicated in 1995, the Memorial is located on the grounds of the PNC Bank Arts Center. It is adjacent to the Vietnam Era Museum and Educational Center.

== History ==
On January 21, 1986, New Jersey Governor Thomas Kean signed legislation appropriating $25,000 to administer a statewide competition for the design of a Vietnam veterans' memorial. The legislation also created the New Jersey Vietnam Veterans’ Memorial Committee, which was tasked with selecting the location for the memorial, raising funds for its construction, and holding a competition for the design of the memorial.

The Holmdel site was selected in 1986 and dedicated in 1987. From 1987 to 1988, a design contest was held; more than 400 entries were submitted. The winning design, submitted by Hien Nguyen, was chosen in 1988. Nguyen is a Vietnamese-American architect who fled Vietnam in 1975.

Gov. Kean held groundbreaking ceremonies at the site on May 7, 1989. In May 1991, three statues to be included in the memorial were unveiled in Trenton; they were sculpted by Thomas Jay Warren. Construction on the memorial began on November 19, 1991. The memorial was dedicated on May 7, 1995. The May 7, 1995 date was chosen because it was the 20th anniversary of the end of the Vietnam War.

== Description ==
The memorial is an open-air circular pavilion, 200 feet (61 m) in diameter. Around the entire outside are 366 8-foot-tall (2.4 m) black granite panels, each one representing a day of the year. The casualties are listed according to what day they were killed. In the middle of the circular pavilion is a red oak, the state tree of New Jersey. This tree provides shade for three statues, one of a dying soldier, one of a nurse tending to his wounds, and one soldier standing at their sides. They represent those who died, the women in the war, and those who came back safely, respectively. They also represent multiple nationalities as the fallen soldier is white, the standing soldier is African American, and the nurse is Latino.

The stone panels are arranged so they are about 12 feet (3.7 m) higher than the inner courtyard. The ten stairways and two ramps leading up to them intersect, as the designer did not want the pathways for the handicapped separate. These ramps are arranged in a double helix, each one ascending to the top in half of the circle. The two entrances to the memorial are tunnels, symbolizing the trip the soldiers took to Vietnam. The memorial is oriented so that the May Seventh panel, the day the war ended, points towards Vietnam.

== Museum and Educational Center ==
The Vietnam Era Museum and Educational Center is adjacent to the memorial. According to one of the officials here, the state asked the designer of the Vietnam Veterans Memorial in Washington, D.C. what she would do over again given the chance to redesign the memorial. She said that, without an educational center explaining the war and turmoil in the country at that time, a memorial could be meaningless to passerby. This is the rationale for the existence of the facility. In 2010, the name of the center was changed from "Vietnam Era Educational Center" was changed to "Vietnam Era Museum & Educational Center".

The Vietnam Era Museum and Educational Center was dedicated in September 1998. The 5,000-square-foot (460 m^{2}) facility had a construction budget of $3.5 million; it was intended to provide a balanced view of the controversial war. When opened it was the only museum of its kind in the United States.
