= Kovenhoven =

Historic house in New Jersey, United States

- Kovenhoven House
- U.S. National Register of Historic Places
- New Jersey Register of Historic Places
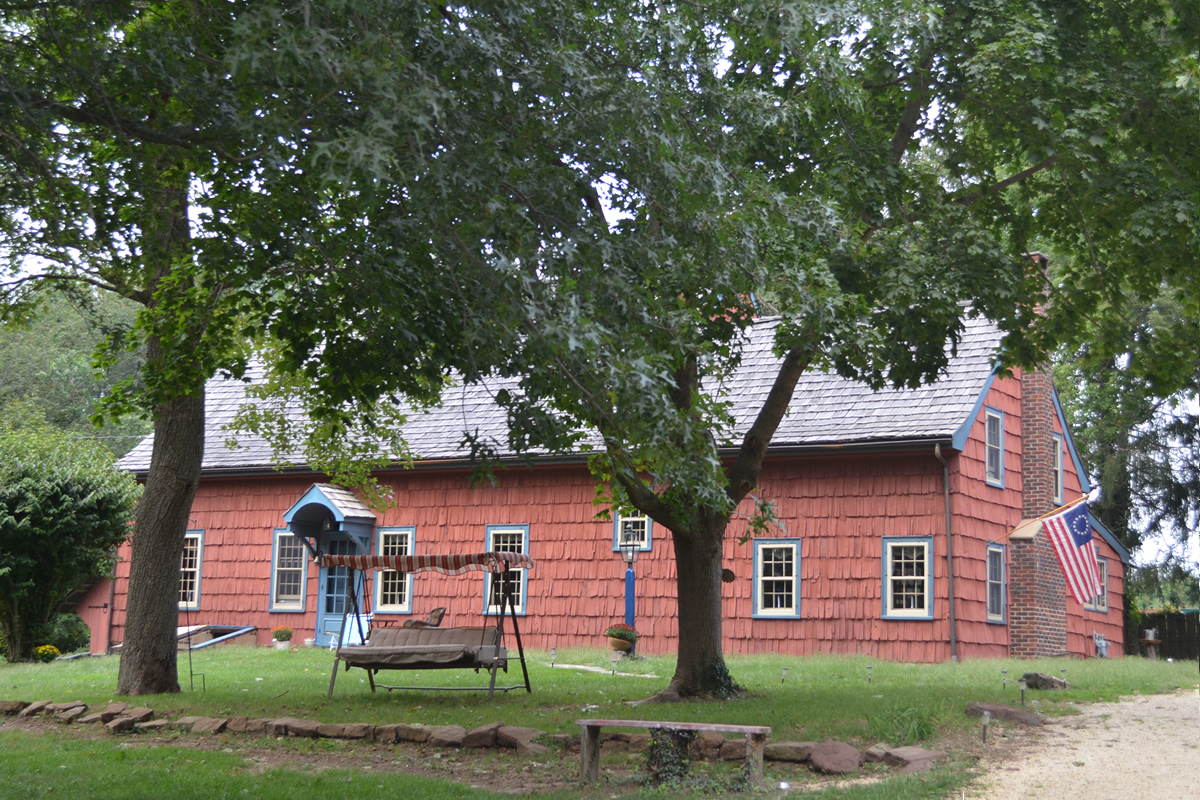

- Location within Monmouth County, New Jersey Location within New Jersey Location within the United States
- Nearest city: Holmdel Township, New Jersey
- Coordinates: 40°21′56″N 74°11′43″W
- Area: 1.5 acres (0.61 ha)
- Built: 1699
- NRHP reference No.: 74001176
- NJRHP No.: 1984

Significant dates
- Added to NRHP: April 26, 1974
- Designated NJRHP: June 5, 1979

The Kovenhoven House or Corneles Couwenhoven House is located in Holmdel Township, Monmouth County, New Jersey, United States. The house was built in 1699 and was added to the National Register of Historic Places on April 26, 1974.

== See also ==
- National Register of Historic Places listings in Monmouth County, New Jersey
