= Holmdel Arboretum =

Arboretum in New Jersey, United States

Coordinates: 40.3306°N 74.1410°W

- Interactive map of Holmdel Arboretum

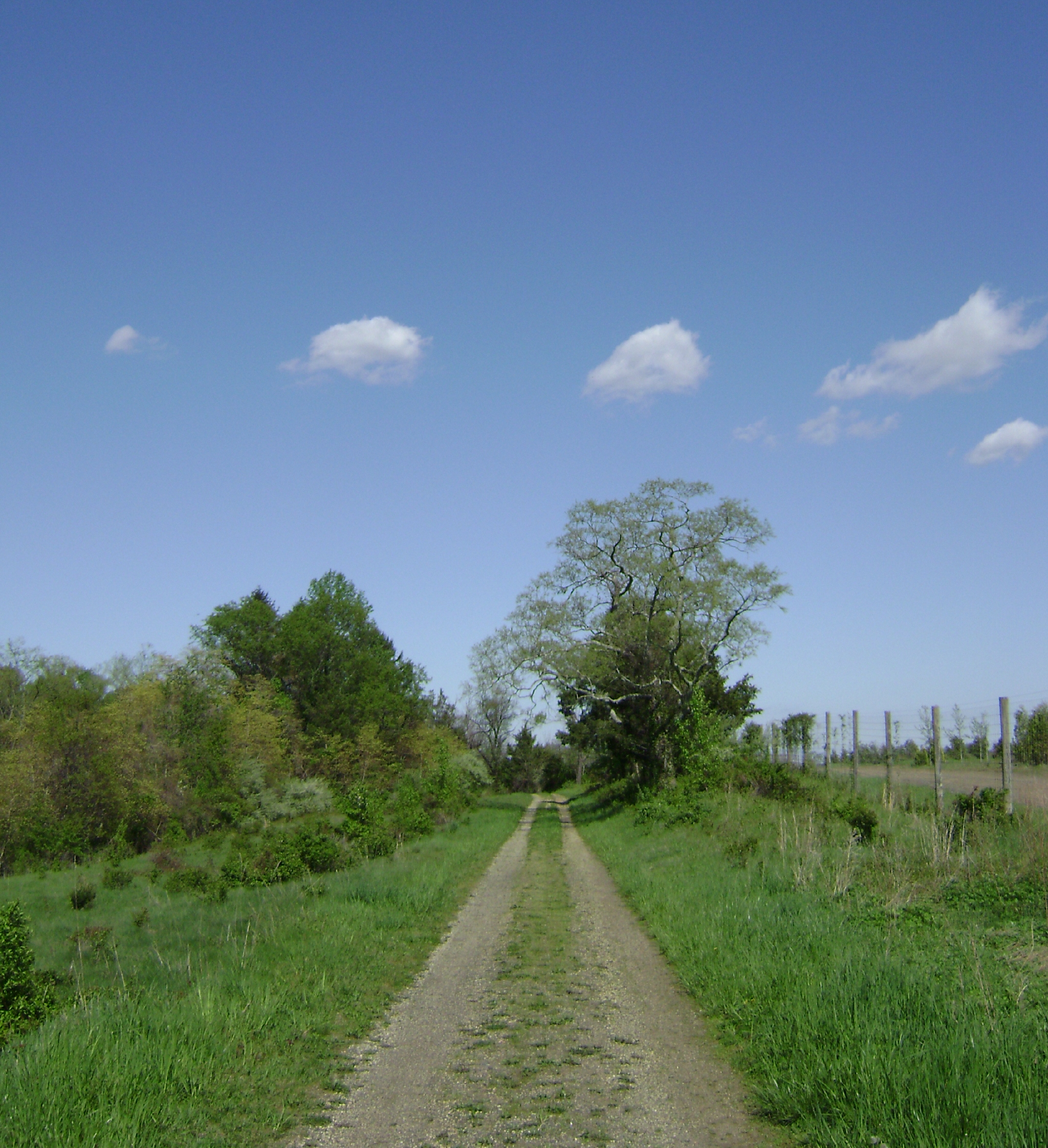

Holmdel Arboretum (22 acres [8.9 ha]), also known as the David C. Shaw Arboretum, is an arboretum located in Holmdel Park, on Longstreet Road in Holmdel Township, New Jersey. The arboretum is open daily without charge.

The arboretum was established in 1963 with 87 trees and is administered by the Monmouth County Shade Tree Commission with the Monmouth County Park System. It was named in honor of David C. Shaw, who was the superintendent of the Monmouth County Shade Tree Commission from 1963 to 2002. The park aims to highlight ornamental trees and shrubs that thrive in New Jersey and encourage nearby home owners to incorporate woody plants in their own landscapes.

It now contains nearly 3,000 trees and shrubs, representing hundreds of species, cultivars, and varieties, including the Jane Kluis Memorial Dwarf Conifer Garden, a collection of true cedars (Cedrus) in honor of David Rossheim, and a variety of other plantings such as weeping Atlas cedar, cherry trees, Amur cork tree, crabapples, bald cypress, dogwoods, fir, weeping Ginkgo, hawthorns, holly, linden, osmanthus, weeping pagoda tree, pine, spruce, etc. A map at the entrance identifies the major plant collections.

== See also ==
- Holmdel Park
- List of botanical gardens in the United States
