= John Conover Smock =

American geologist (1842–1926)

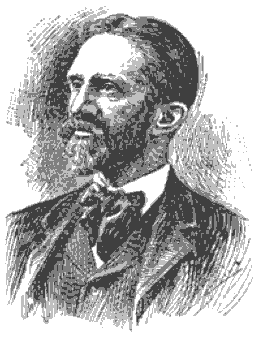
- Born: September 21, 1842; Holmdel Township, New Jersey
- Died: April 21, 1926 (aged 83); Hudson, New York
- Education: Rutgers College; Lafayette College
- Occupation: Geologist

John Conover Smock (September 21, 1842 – April 21, 1926) was an American geologist.

== Biography ==
Smock was born in Holmdel Township, New Jersey, graduated at Rutgers College in 1862, and was tutor in chemistry there 1865–67. He became Professor-elect of Mining and Metallurgy in 1867, holding the chair 1871–75, meantime studying in Germany at the Technische Universität Bergakademie Freiberg and at the University of Berlin. He was assistant in charge of the New York State Museum 1885–89, received a Ph.D. from Lafayette College in 1882, and was manager of the American Institute of Mining Engineers 1875–77.

Smock was associated with George Hammell Cook in preparing the annual reports of the Geological Survey of New Jersey for 1871–84, and in the volumes on The Geology of New Jersey (1868), and the Report on Clay Deposits; issued, as a bulletin of the State museum, On Building-Stones in New York (1888).

In 1890 he was appointed State Geologist of New Jersey.

He died in Hudson, New York, on April 21, 1926.
