= Kill the Alarm =

American rock band

Kill the Alarm is a rock band from New York City that is led by singer/songwriter Garen Gueyikian.

Gueyikian had previously fronted the band Granian, a name he had also used for solo work until he adopted the new name Kill the Alarm in 2006. They sold out a string of New York city shows including a show in early 2008 at the Bowery Ballroom. Additionally, the band played shows with Eve 6, Pat McGee, Cowboy Mouth, Pete Francis Heimbold (of Dispatch), Stephen Kellogg and the Sixers, Nine Days, Stroke 9, Guster, O.A.R., and Keith Kane (of Vertical Horizon).

Their single "Fire Away" debuted on radio at #15 on FMQB Submodern Charts.

The band has been featured on CW11 TV's Artist Spotlight "On the Radar" in New York, and their songs have appeared on multiple TV shows including, Dawson’s Creek , Keeping up with the Kardashians, Real World, Road Rules, America's Psychic Challenge, Dr. Steve-O, and Whittaker Bay.

Kill the Alarm's debut album Fire Away was released in 2007 (and January 8, 2009 on iTunes) and was produced by Jon Kaplan (Gavin Degraw, Maroon 5, Ingrid Michaelson, Jet Lag Gemini). The album garnered comparisons to alternative rock bands from the 1990s, such as Eve 6, Cowboy Mouth, Live, Better than Ezra, and Matchbox 20.

Kill The Alarm's popularity increased due to JamLegend, an online music rhythm game. Their song "Fire Away" is one of the top-played songs in the game worldwide.

In 2009, Gueyikian launched a Kickstarter project to fund a new EP. Following sessions in Los Angeles and Nashville, the EP was released in May 2011, with a CD release show at the Mercury Lounge in New York.

== Discography ==
- Fire Away (2007)
- The Covers (2011)
- Against The Grain - EP (2011)
- Dance Across The Sky - EP (2012)
- Sleeping Giant (2016)
