= Holmes–Hendrickson House =

Historic house in New Jersey, United States

- U.S. National Register of Historic Places
- New Jersey Register of Historic Places
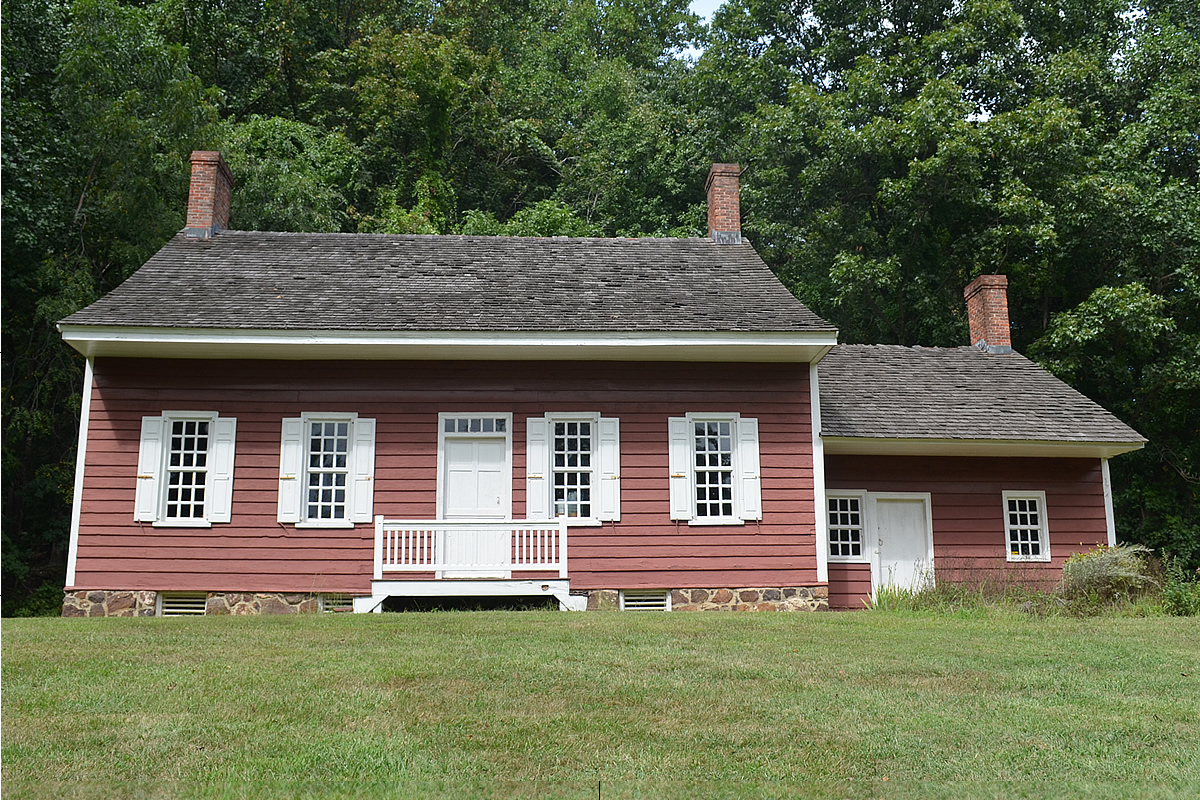

- Location within Monmouth County, New Jersey Location within New Jersey Location within the United States
- Location: 62 Longstreet Road, adjacent to Holmdel Park, Holmdel Township, New Jersey
- Coordinates: 40°22′23″N 74°10′55″W
- Built: c. 1754
- Architectural style: Dutch-Flemish
- NRHP reference No.: 78001776
- NJRHP No.: 1982

Significant dates
- Added to NRHP: April 26, 1978
- Designated NJRHP: December 19, 1977

The Holmes–Hendrickson House is located at 62 Longstreet Road, adjacent to Holmdel Park, in Holmdel Township of Monmouth County, New Jersey, United States. The farmhouse was built around 1754 by William Holmes, a descendant of Obadiah Holmes and Cornelius Hendrickson. William sold the property to his maternal first cousin, Garret Hendrickson, shortly after construction. The property changed hands several times after Garret's death in 1801, and was eventually purchased by Bell Labs in 1929. At risk of demolition during construction of the Bell Labs Holmdel Complex, the structure was sold to the Monmouth County Historical Association, who relocated the building to its present location in 1959. Ownership of the structure was transferred in 2019 to the Monmouth County Park System. The house is one of several historic properties owned by the Monmouth County Park System and is operated as a historic house museum by MCPS in cooperation with MCHA.

The house was documented as the Hendrick Hendrickson House by the Historic American Buildings Survey (HABS) in 1939. It was added to the National Register of Historic Places on April 26, 1978, for its significance in agriculture and architecture. The house is also listed on the Monmouth County Historic Sites Inventory.

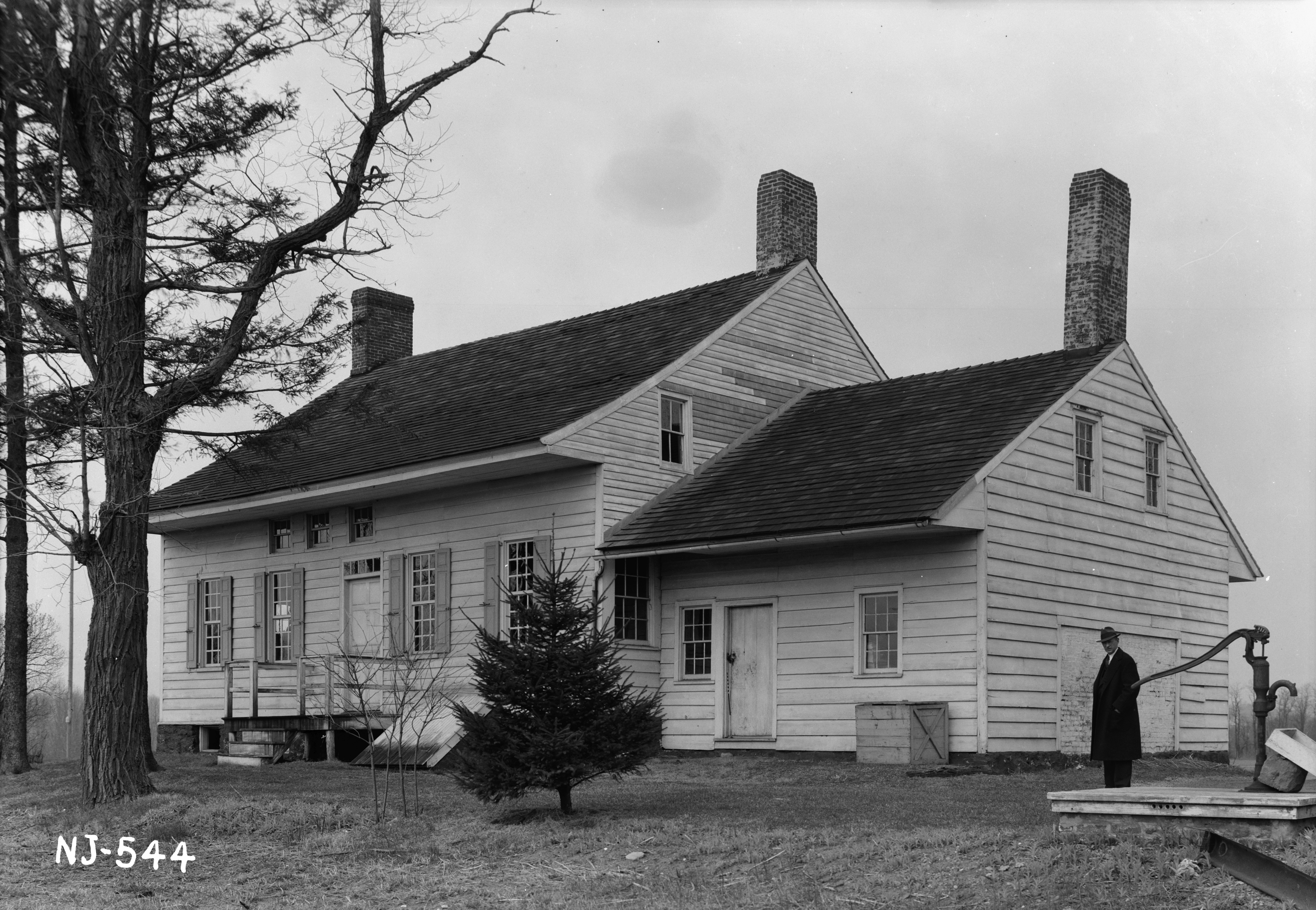
HABS photo from 1939

== See also ==
- National Register of Historic Places listings in Monmouth County, New Jersey
- List of the oldest buildings in New Jersey
- List of museums in New Jersey
