= The Atlantic School =

Coordinates: 40.421452°N 74.142673°W

Information
- Former name: New School High School of Monmouth County (1998-2003)
- Established: 1998
- Founders: Rebekah Chilvers; Dale Thompson
- Closed: 2004

The Atlantic School was a high school in the Monmouth County area of New Jersey that opened in 1998, notable for its style of alternative education until its closure in 2004.

Founded as the New School of Monmouth County High School by former public school teacher Dale Thompson and the daughter of one of the founders of the original New School elementary school, Rebekah Chilvers, the New School High School marked a radical departure from traditional educational philosophy. The New School tenets were drawn from a variety of British alternative teaching practice known as "open-classroom." Rather than relying on tests and grades to measure student progress, the New School High School or NSHS abolished these practices and instead centered on individualized learning centered on all-encompassing yearly themes. Work completed during the course of the year was collected in a portfolio, which served as an alternative method of measuring student's achievements (rather than using grades). The NSHS also had rather lax policies, compared to traditional public schools, in such areas as scheduling, dress codes, etc.

However, the NSHS never grew to a particularly large size. After a peak in enrollment in the 2001–2002 school year, the size of the student body began declining. The replacement of Dale's Thompson's co-teacher twice also caused some difficulty for the school. In 2003, the NSHS's name was changed to the Atlantic School.

The Atlantic School was short lived. In June 2004, the last graduates were promoted and the school itself shut down.
