= Carol Jane Anger Rieke =

American astronomer, computational chemist and mathematics educator

- Carol Jane Anger Rieke, from a 1938 photograph
- Born: Carol Jane Anger; January 17, 1908
- Died: December 31, 1999 (aged 91); Tucson, Arizona, United States
- Education: Radcliffe College (PhD)
- Children: 2, including George H. Rieke
- Relatives: Marcia J. Rieke (daughter-in-law)
- Awards: Caroline Wilby Prize
- Scientific career
- Fields: Astronomy
- Workplaces: University of Chicago; South Suburban College
- Thesis: Spectroscopic Parallaxes of Galactic and Moving Clusters (1932)
- Doctoral advisor: John Hasbrouck Van Vleck

Carol Jane Anger Rieke (January 17, 1908 – December 31, 1999) was an American astronomer, computational chemist, and mathematics educator. She co-authored papers with Nobel Prize laureate Robert S. Mulliken.

== Early life and education ==
Carol Jane Anger was from Evanston, Illinois. She attended Northwestern University, where she had excellent grades and won several awards, including a cup in 1926 as the "best woman rifle shot in the University." She pursued graduate studies in astronomy at Radcliffe College, working at Harvard University with Cecilia Payne-Gaposchkin and Harlow Shapley. She earned her Ph.D. in 1932, with Nobel laureate in Physics John Hasbrouck Von Vleck as her advisor; her dissertation, "Spectroscopic Parallaxes of Galactic and Moving Clusters" won the Caroline Wilby Prize for outstanding Radcliffe thesis that year. She spent a year at Harvard Observatory as a recipient of the Sarah Berliner Research Fellowship from the American Association of University Women. Rieke did further postdoctoral work on computational chemistry at the University of Chicago, under Nobel laureate in Chemistry Robert S. Mulliken.

== Career ==
After her marriage, the course of Rieke's scientific career depended significantly on her husband's career locations. She continued making spectroscopic measurements at the Harvard Observatory after completing her doctoral work. In 1938 she attended the fourth Washington Conference on Theoretical Physics at George Washington University; she was the lone woman scientist in attendance and in the group photographs, standing with John von Neumann, Edward Teller, George Gamow, Hans Bethe, and Subrahmanyan Chandrasekhar.

She co-authored papers with Mulliken while she lived in Chicago. When the Riekes moved to Massachusetts during World War II, she worked on radar countermeasures. After the war, her husband joined the physics faculty at Purdue University, but nepotism rules meant she could not also become a faculty member; she was, instead, a lecturer in mathematics. When the couple moved back to Chicago, she taught mathematics at South Suburban College while resuming her chemistry research with Mulliken.

Rieke served as an elected member of the Bremen Community High School District 228 Board of Education from 1957 to 1963, while her children were in school there. She was also involved in the League of Women Voters and the Girl Scouts in the Chicago suburbs, and active with the Harvard-Radcliffe Club of Chicago.

== Personal life ==
Carol Jane Anger married physicist Foster Frederick Rieke in 1932. They had two children, George and Katharine. Their son George H. Rieke became an astronomer, and married another astronomer, Marcia J. Rieke. Their daughter Katharine Rieke Lawson is on the faculty at the Albert Einstein College of Medicine in New York. Carol A. Rieke was widowed when Foster Rieke died in 1970. She died at the end of 1999, aged 91 years, in Tucson, Arizona.

== Honors and awards ==
Carol Jane Anger was elected to membership in the American Astronomical Society at its meeting in Chicago in 1930.

South Suburban College named an annual scholarship after Rieke.

== Selected publications ==
Scientific publications by Rieke included

- "A study of the spectrum of alpha2 Canum Venaticorum" (Astrophysical Journal 1929),
- "Wave-Length Standards in the Extreme Ultraviolet" (Phys. Rev. 1936, with Kenneth R. More),
- "Molecular electronic spectra, dispersion and polarization: The theoretical interpretation and computation of oscillator strengths and intensities" (Reports on Progress in Physics 1940, with Mulliken),
- "Hyperconjugation" (Journal of the American Chemical Society 1941, with Mulliken and Weldon G. Brown),
- "Bond Integrals and Spectra With an Analysis of Kynch and Penney's Paper on the Heat of Sublimation of Carbon" (Rev. Mod. Phys. 1942, with Mulliken).
