= George Gamow Memorial Lectures =

Science lectures

The George Gamow Memorial Lectures are an annual series of lectures at the University of Colorado Boulder, named in honor of the physicist and science popularizer George Gamow, author of One Two Three... Infinity and the Mr Tompkins series.

== Background ==
The lectures were established by Gamow's widow, Barbara Perkins Gamow, and the University's Department of Physics in 1971, to "promote public understanding of the nature and role of science." In 1975, Mrs. Gamow included in her will an endowment to maintain the lectures. The George Gamow lecturers have included 27 Nobel Laureates in the sciences. Lectures are held at the university's Macky Auditorium, and are free and open to the public.

Frances Arnold, Nobel Laureate in Chemistry, 2018, was to lecture on “Innovation by Evolution: Bringing New Chemistry to Life” but her lecture was postponed due to the COVID-19 pandemic. In 2024, the Lectures resumed with Dr. Andrea Ghez, Nobel Laureate in Physics, 2020.

== List of Lecturers ==
- 1971 Victor Weisskopf, theoretical physicist, on "What has society done for physics and what has physics done for society?" and "What is the proton made of?"
- 1972 Eugene Wigner, Nobel Laureate in Physics, 1963, on "Symmetry Principles and Nature"
- 1973 Geoffrey Burbidge, astronomer
- 1974 Marshall W. Nirenberg, Nobel Laureate in Physiology or Medicine, 1968
- 1975 Ivar Giaever, Nobel Laure in Physics, 1973 and Hans Bethe, Nobel Laureate in Physics, 1967
- 1976 T. D. Lee, Nobel Laureate in Physics, 1957
- 1978 James Watson, Nobel Laureate in Physiology or Medicine, 1967 on the "RNA Tie Club" and Lyman Spitzer, astronomer
- 1979 Melvin Calvin, Nobel Laureate in Chemistry, 1961
- 1980 Paul A. M. Dirac, Nobel Laureate in Physics, 1933
- 1981 Linus Pauling, Nobel Laureate in Chemistry, 1954 and Peace, 1962
- 1982 Stanislaw Ulam, mathematician
- 1983 Paul B. McCready, engineer
- 1984 Paul Berg, Nobel Laureate in Chemistry, 1980
- 1985 Luis Walter Alvarez, Nobel Laureate in Physics, 1968 and Walter Alvarez, geologist
- 1987 Abdus Salam, Nobel Laureate in Physics, 1979 and Rosalyn Sussman Yalow, Nobel Laureate in Physiology of Medicine, 1977
- 1989 Stephen Schneider, climatologist
- 1990 Leon M. Lederman, Nobel Laureate in Physics, 1988
- 1991 Freeman Dyson, theoretical physicist and Fang Li-Zhi, astrophysicist
- 1992 Norman Myers, environmental scientist
- 1993 Norman Foster Ramsey Jr., Nobel Laureate in Physics, 1989
- 1994 Susan Solomon, atmospheric chemist
- 1995 Eric Cornell and Carl Wieman, who would share the 2001 Nobel Prize in Physics and Sylvia Earle, marine biologist
- 1996 John Horner, paleontologist
- 1997 Edward C. Stone, rocket scientist, on "“The Search for Life Elsewhere"
- 1998 Stanley B. Prusiner, Nobel Laureate in Physiology or Medicine, 1997, on "Prions – A New Paradigm in Biology and Medicine"
- 1999 Robert Ballard, oceanographer
- 2000 Martin Rees, Astronomer Royal, on "Six Cosmic Numbers: Understanding the Beginning and the End"
- 2001 Eric Kandel, Nobel Laureate in Physiology or Medicine, 2000, on "The Past, the Future and the Biology of Memory Storage"
- 2002 Richard Zare, chemist
- 2003 Thomas Cech, Nobel Laureate in Chemistry, 1989, on "From Catalytic RNA to Howard Hughes"
- 2004 Robert Kirshner, astronomer and Paul Sereno, paleontologist
- 2006 Geoffrey Marcy, astronomer
- 2007 Lisa Randall, theoretical physicist, on "Warped Passages: Unraveling the Mysteries of the Universe's Hidden Dimensions"
- 2008 Kerry Emmanuel, meteorologist
- 2009 Joy Hirsch, neuroscientist
- 2010 Richard Alley, geologist, on "Learning While Burning: Peak (Whale) Oil, Changing Climate and Our Future"
- 2011 Frank Wilczek, Nobel Laureate in Physics, 2004, on "Anticipating a New Golden Age: A Vision and Its Fiery Trial at the Large Hadron Collider”
- 2012 Adam G. Riess, Nobel Laureate in Physics, 2011, on "Supernovae and the Discovery of the Accelerating Universe"
- 2013 Brian Greene, theoretical physicist, on "The Hidden Reality: From Unification to Multiverse"
- 2014 David J. Wineland, Nobel Laureate in Physics, 2012, on "Quantum Computing and Schrödinger 's Cat"
- 2015 Jane Goodall, primatologist, on "Sowing the Seeds of Hope" This lecture was held at the University's Coors Event Center due to popular demand.
- 2016 Kip S. Thorne, who would win the Nobel Prize in Physics in 2017, on "Probing the Warped Side of the Universe with Gravitational Waves: From the Big Bang to Black Holes”
- 2018 Vint Cerf, computer scientist, on "Digital Preservation"
- 2024 Andrea Ghez, astrophysicist, Nobel laureate in Physics, 2020, on "From the Possibility to the Certainty of a Supermassive Black Hole"
- 2025 Jennifer Doudna, biochemist, Nobel laureate in Physiology or Medicine, 2020, on "Genome Editing the Future: Improving Human and Planet Health with CRISPR"
