= Washington Conference on Theoretical Physics =

Limited series of physics conferences (1935-1947)

The Washington Conferences on Theoretical Physics were ten academic conferences held annually in Washington, D.C., United States from 1935 to 1947. The conferences were organized by nuclear physicists George Gamow and Edward Teller from George Washington University and geophysicist John Adam Fleming from Carnegie Institution of Washington. Topics included nuclear physics, condensed matter physics, geophysics, biophysics, astrophysics and cosmology. These were invitation-only events and small in size, the 1938 conference, for example, consisted of 25 members.

During the 1939 conference, Niels Bohr famously announced the discovery of nuclear fission.

== History ==
In 1934, geophysicist Merle Tuve of Carnegie Institution, proposed the president of George Washington University (GWU), Cloyd H. Marvin, to open a professorship in theoretical physics to make a bridge between the two institutions. George Gamow was invited and took the position the same year. He accepted under two conditions, he wanted his collaborator Edward Teller to be accepted as well, and he wanted to be responsible of organizing a series of international conferences. John Adam Fleming from Carnegie Institution also joined the organization.

=== Major events ===
The first conference was held on 1935 on the topic of nuclear physics. The discussion was around the differences between the nucleon magnetic moment and the electron magnetic moment, as well as theories of gamma rays and of beta decay.

The 4th conference in 1938 was on stellar energy and nuclear processes. Hans Bethe inspired by the discussions during the conference, developed in 1939 a theory of stellar nuclear processes, including the theory of the CNO cycle. He received the 1967 Nobel Prize in Physics for this work.

On January 26, 1939, during the 5th conference on low temperature physics, Bohr made speech on an unrelated topic. He made the first overt announcement to the scientific community on the successful splitting of uranium nuclei by neutron bombardment. The discoveries were made by Otto Hahn and Fritz Strassmann, who confirmed the ideas of Otto Robert Frisch and Lise Meitner, colleague of Hahn, in Copenhagen. Teller reports that Tuve reproduced the experiment overnight and invited the participants the next day to observe the fission events in his lab with the aid of a Geiger counter. Scientists rapidly raised concerns that such a discovery could enable Nazi Germany to develop a nuclear weapon. This announcement led to the Einstein–Szilard letter sent to the US president Franklin D. Roosevelt. The implications of this discovery were not communicated to the wider public until 1945.

During 1942, the conferences were postponed due to United States involvement in World War II. During this time, Teller went to work in the Manhattan Project. The project led to the creation of the first atomic bomb.

The conference series restarted in 1946 on the topic of biophysics by recent interest of Gamow on proteins.

The last conference was on gravitation and electromagnetism in November 1947. It followed after the Shelter Island Conference (June 1947) which had reawakened the interest of physicists in quantum field theory. Julian Schwinger was present in both of the conferences and, in-between conferences, worked a preliminary paper on his seminal calculation of the anomalous magnetic dipole moment of the electron (published in 1948). This attracted the attention of J. Robert Oppenheimer and Richard Feynman, both also present at Washington, leading to the development of quantum electrodynamics.

=== Dissolution ===
After the 10th conference in 1947, the conferences were discontinued due to a variety of reasons: Gamow had turned his interest into cosmology, Teller had left after the war to work at the University of Chicago and Fleming, co-organizer had stepped down from his position of chief of the Department of Terrestrial Magnetism at Carnegie Institution.

== Legacy ==
In 2003, Stephen Joel Trachtenberg commissioned two bronze plaques that were mounted in the Corcoran Hall of GWU. One about the life and work of Gamow, and another plaque of the 1939 announcement of Bohr. Bohr's plate begins as:

In this room, January 26, 1939, Niels Bohr made the first public announcement of the successful disintegration of uranium into barium with the attendant release of approximately two hundred million electron volts of energy per disintegration. This announcement was heard by the physicists listed below who were attending the fifth of the Conferences on Theoretical Physics which are sponsored jointly by the Carnegie Institution of Washington and The George Washington University.

== Conferences and participants ==
=== Timeline ===
Here is a list of all the conferences an topics covered:

Year	Main topic
1935	Nuclear Physics
1936	Molecular Physics
1937	Problems of Elementary Particles and Nuclear Physics
1938	Stellar Energy and Nuclear Processes
1939	Low Temperature Physics and Superconductivity
1940	Geophysics and the Interior of the Earth
1941	Elementary Particles
1942	Stellar Evolution and Cosmology
Gap due to World War II
1946	Physics on Living Matter
1947	Gravitation and Electromagnetism

=== List of participants ===
Aside from Gamow, Teller, Fleming and Tuve, some notable participants include:

- Hans Bethe (1935-1940)
- Gregory Breit (1935-1940, 1946)
- Edward Condon (1935, 1936, 1939)
- Paul Dirac (1935)
- Samuel Goudsmit (1935)
- Lawrence R. Hafstad (1935, 1936, 1938, 1939)
- Lothar Wolfgang Nordheim (1935, 1936)
- George Uhlenbeck (1935, 1939)
- Ralph H. Fowler (1936)
- James Franck (1936, 1942)
- Maria Goeppert Mayer (1936)
- Karl Herzfeld (1936, 1938, 1939 1942)
- Irving Langmuir (1936)
- Linus Pauling (1936)
- John C. Slater (1936, 1940)
- Hertha Sponer (1936)
- Harold Urey (1936, 1939)
- John Hasbrouck Van Vleck (1936, 1939, 1940)
- Eugene Wigner (1936, 1937, 1941)
- Niels Bohr (1937, 1939)
- Isidor Isaac Rabi (1937, 1939, 1940)
- John Archibald Wheeler (1937, 1947)
- Carol Jane Anger Rieke (1938)
- Subrahmanyan Chandrasekhar (1938, 1942)
- John von Neumann (1938, 1946)
- Fritz London (1939, 1946)
- Enrico Fermi (1939-1941)
- Otto Stern (1939)
- Léon Rosenfeld (1939)
- John Bardeen (1940)
- Walter Hermann Bucher (1940)
- Walter M. Elsasser (1940)
- J. Robert Oppenheimer (1941, 1947)
- Victor Weisskopf (1941)
- Willis Lamb (1942)
- Wolfgang Pauli (1942)
- Harlow Shapley (1942)
- George Beadle (1946)
- Carl Ferdinand Cori (1946)
- Leo Szilard (1946)
- Hermann Weyl (1946, 1947)
- Ralph Alpher (1947)
- Leopold Infeld (1947)
- Richard Feynman (1947)
- Julian Schwinger (1947)
- Howard P. Robertson (1947)
