= John Adam Fleming =

American geophysicist

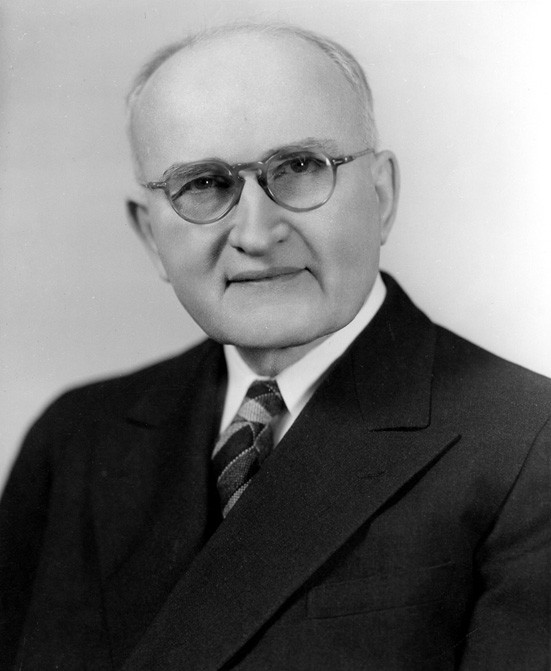
- Photo of Fleming
- Born: January 28, 1877; Cincinnati, United States
- Died: July 29, 1956 (aged 79); San Mateo, California
- Education: University of Cincinnati
- Awards: National Academy of Sciences (1940); William Bowie Medal (1941); The Chree Medal and Prize (1945)
- Scientific career
- Workplaces: U.S. Coast and Geodetic Survey

John Adam Fleming (January 28, 1877 – July 29, 1956) was an American geophysicist interested in the magnetosphere and the atmospheric electricity. Fleming worked first at the United States Coast and Geodetic Survey with his superior Louis Agricola Bauer, who founded the Department of Terrestrial Magnetism at the Carnegie Institution of Washington. He steadily advanced in the hierarchy of the institute and became its director in 1935. In 1925, Fleming served as president of the Philosophical Society of Washington. Fleming was elected into the National Academy of Sciences in 1940. He was one of the main organizers of the Washington Conferences on Theoretical Physics (1935–1947) with George Gamow.

== John Adam Fleming Medal ==
Since 1960 the American Geophysical Union rewards notable scientists in the field of research about the magnetosphere and atmospheric electricity.
