= Yčas =

- Lithuanian surname
- m.: Yčas
- f.: (unmarried): Yčaitė
- f.: (married): Yčienė

Yčas is a Lithuanian surname. The Dictionary of Lithuanian surnames suggests that it is an abbreviation of a baptismal name, but unclear which one, cf. Bulgarian Ичo/Ицо from Христо or Илия. Notable people with the surname include:

- Jonas Yčas (1880–1931), pedagogue, state and public figure, professor, pioneer of national historiography, evangelical reformer
- Martynas Yčas (1917–2014), American microbiologist of Lithuanian descent
- Martynas Yčas (politician) (1885–1941), Lithuanian public figure, lawyer, politician, publicist, editor, and statesman
