= George H. Rieke =

American astronomer

- Education: Harvard University (PhD), Oberlin College
- Scientific career
- Fields: Astronomy and Astrophysics
- Workplaces: University of Arizona; Steward Observatory
- Thesis: A Search for Cosmic Sources of 10^{11} To 10^{14} eV Gamma-Rays (1969)
- Doctoral advisor: Giovanni Fazio
- Doctoral students: Kevin Luhman

George Henry Rieke (born January 5, 1943), a noted American infrared astronomer, is former Deputy Director of the Steward Observatory and Regents Professor of Astronomy and Planetary Sciences at the University of Arizona in Tucson. He led the experiment design and development team for the Multiband Imaging Photometer for Spitzer (MIPS) instrument on NASA's infrared Spitzer Space Telescope, and currently chairs the science team of the Mid-Infrared Instrument for the James Webb Space Telescope.

== Career and research ==
Rieke completed his bachelor's degree in physics at Oberlin College. He completed his master's and PhD degrees in physics at Harvard University in 1969.

Among other contributions, Rieke and his group discovered ultraluminous infrared galaxies, the starburst phenomenon, studies of the Galactic Center as a prototypical active galactic nucleus, the physical origin of the infrared emission of active galactic nuclei, planetary debris disks, as well as Solar System astronomy at infrared wavelengths.

Rieke helped develop the first infrared-optimized telescope and constructed a series of state-of-the-art focal plane instruments. Rieke was involved with the Spacelab 2 infrared telescope, a pioneering infrared space mission. He led the MIPS instrument team for Spitzer. The highly sensitive MIPS camera was built at Ball Aerospace under Rieke's leadership. Also, Rieke is the lead scientist on a team to produce a Mid-Infrared Instrument (MIRI) for the James Webb Space Telescope.

== Honors and awards ==
Rieke was elected as a fellow of the American Academy of Arts and Sciences in mathematics and physics category on May 2, 2003. He was elected to the National Academy of Sciences in 2011. He was cited for his contributions as an infrared observer and instrumentalist. He was awarded a Sloan Research Fellowship in 1976, a Vikram Sarabhai Professorship in 1986, a NASA Public Service Group Achievement Award in 1986, a NASA Public Service Medal in 2005, and the Koffler Prize for creative scholarship at the University of Arizona in 2006.

He was elected a Legacy Fellow of the American Astronomical Society in 2020.

== Personal life ==
George Rieke is the son of astronomer and computational chemist Carol Jane Anger Rieke. He is married to the infrared astronomer Marcia J. Rieke.

== Books ==
- Detection of Light: from the Ultraviolet to the Submillimeter, George Rieke, Cambridge University Press, 1994; second edition 2002.
- The Last of the Great Observatories: Spitzer and the Era of Faster, Better, Cheaper at NASA, George H. Rieke, University of Arizona Press, 2006. Received starred review from Publishedrs Weekly.
- Measuring the Universe: A Multiwavelength Perspective, George H. Rieke, Cambridge University Press, 2012. Winner of the Chambliss Award for astronomical textbook writing.
