= Matvei Bronstein =

Soviet theoretical physicist (1906–1938)

- Матвей Бронштейн
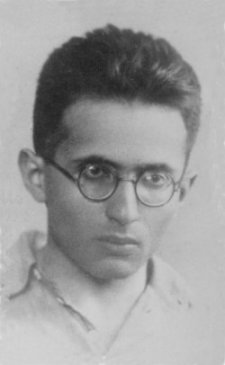
- Born: 29 November 1906; Vinnytsia, Russian Empire
- Died: 18 February 1938 (aged 31); Leningrad, Soviet Union
- Known for: Quantum gravity cGh physics
- Spouse: Lydia Chukovskaya
- Scientific career
- Fields: Physics

Matvei Petrovich Bronstein (Russian: Матвей Петрович Бронштейн, 2 December [O.S. 19 November] 1906 – 18 February 1938) was a Soviet theoretical physicist, a pioneer of quantum gravity, author of works in astrophysics, semiconductors, quantum electrodynamics and cosmology, as well as of a number of books in popular science for children. He was married to Lydia Chukovskaya, a writer and human rights activist.

== Career and personal life ==
Bronstein was the son of a doctor and was of Jewish descent. He studied at the University of Leningrad from 1926 to 1932 and subsequently worked at the Leningrad Physical-Technical Institute (FTI or PTI), where Yakov Frenkel and Abram Fedorovich Ioffe were the leading scientists. He was considered one of the most promising young theoretical physicists, alongside colleagues like Lev Landau, who moved to Kharkov in 1932, George Gamow, Viktor Ambartsumian and Dmitri Ivanenko. He lectured at the institute, wrote review articles, and published numerous popular science articles. Among his students was Arkady Migdal in 1936.

During the 1930s, Bronstein worked on various branches of physics, including semiconductor theory, quantum electrodynamics, astrophysics, and cosmology. His review articles on semiconductor physics, then a new research area at the Leningrad Institute, were highly influential. However, he declined Frenkel’s 1934 offer to receive his doctorate for this work. He also lectured on nuclear physics, the second major research focus of the institute, where he was assigned to the relevant group led by Ioffe and Kurchatov from 1932 onward. Although he published little on nuclear physics, he pursued astrophysical applications in this field, such as the origin of cosmic rays and supernova explosions.

In 1931, a scandal erupted at the institute when younger theorists, including Gamow, Bronstein, Landau, and Ivanenko, sent a mocking letter to the director of the Physics Institute of Moscow University, Boris Hessen (1893–1936). Hessen had published an outdated article on the concept of the ether in the Soviet Encyclopedia, which the theorists ridiculed by illustrating the letter with bottles labeled “Ether” and “Phlogiston.”

In 1932, Bronstein, together with Ivanenko, translated Paul Dirac’s textbook on quantum mechanics into Russian, which was published in 1937. He is best remembered today for being one of the first to address the problems of quantum gravity. Like Markus Fierz, Wolfgang Pauli, and Léon Rosenfeld, Bronstein recognized that the linearized gravitational field theory, corresponding to general relativity, is equivalent to the quantum theory of spin-2 fields. However, he foresaw difficulties in quantization due to the nonlinear nature of the theory and speculated that a radically new concept of space-time might ultimately be necessary. At that time, the idea that gravity needed to be quantized was far from being a consensus among theoretical physicists.

In one of his last works, Bronstein refuted a then-officially favored Soviet explanation of the galaxy redshift discovered by Edwin Hubble. Instead of attributing it to the universe’s expansion, Soviet authorities claimed it was caused by the aging (decay) of photons—a theory Bronstein disproved. At that time, a campaign against modern physics was underway in the Soviet Union, temporarily stripping even prominent theorists like Igor Tamm and Leonid Mandelstam of their teaching privileges.

Bronstein also engaged in practical research, publishing a paper on an electromagnetic method for measuring an aircraft’s speed, which received Kurchatov’s approval.

=== cGh theories ===
Bronstein introduced the cGh a conceptual “cube of physical theories,” scheme for classifying physical theories, with the aim of unifying special relativity (denoted by speed of light, c), gravitation (denoted by the gravitational constant, G), and quantum mechanics (denoted by the Planck constant, h). The cube is an orthonormal coordinate system, where each axis corresponds to one of these universal constants.

- When G is set to 0, gravitational forces are removed, decoupling matter from space and time.
- When h is set to 0, quantum properties vanish, eliminating the wave-particle duality of light.
- When 1/c is set to 0, time and space become independent from one another.

The initial idea for this framework came from Lev Landau, Dmitri Ivanenko, and George Gamow, though Bronstein developed it further in his theoretical work.

- (0,0,0) – Classical Newtonian mechanics (no relativistic, quantum, or gravitational effects).
- (1,0,0) – Special relativity (relativistic effects only).
- (0,1,0) – Quantum mechanics (quantum effects only).
- (0,0,1) – Newtonian gravitation (classical gravitational effects only).
- (1,1,0) – Quantum field theory (relativistic and quantum effects).
- (1,0,1) – General relativity (relativistic and gravitational effects).
- (0,1,1) – Newtonian quantum gravity (quantum and gravitational effects without relativity).
- (1,1,1) – The "Theory of Everything" (a fully unified theory incorporating quantum mechanics, relativity, and gravitation).

This theoretical model remains a way to conceptualize the relationships between different physical theories and the constants that define them.

=== Arrest and execution ===
On 1 August 1937 during the Great Purge, which nearly claimed the life of the famous theoretical physicist Lev Landau, people with a search and arrest warrant turned up at Bronstein's apartment at 38 Rubinstein Street, St. Petersburg. He was not home. Bronstein was arrested later in Kiev in the Ukrainian SSR at his parents' house and driven to Leningrad.

He was convicted by a list trial in February 1938 and, executed the same day in the basement of the Leningrad NKVD prison. The exact reason for his arrest remains unknown, and contrary to some claims, he was not related to Leon Trotsky.

His wife, poet and future human rights activist Lydia Chukovskaya, was falsely informed that he had been sentenced to 10 years of labor camps without the right of correspondence.

=== Legacy ===
Bronstein also authored several popular science books in Russian, including Solar Matter, a children’s book, as well as Structure of Matter (1935), Inventors of Radio, and X-Rays, all of which were reissued after his rehabilitation in 1957. He had also planned to write a book about Galileo.

Bronstein's books for children "Solar Matter" (Солнечное вещество), "X Rays" (Лучи X), "Inventors of Radio" (Изобретатели радио) were republished after his reputation had been rehabilitated posthumously on 9 May 1957. In 1990, his wife had a monument erected in the Levashovo Memorial Cemetery where he was thought to have been buried.

The Bronstein Prize in Loop Quantum Gravity is offered to post-doctoral scholars in the field, the inaugural winner of which was Eugenio Bianchi in 2013.

George Gamow referred to him as Abatic Bronstein in his autobiography.

His grave is located in the Levashovo Memorial Cemetery near St. Petersburg.

== Solar Matter ==
Samuil Marshak, a children's writer and editor, scouted Bronstein to write a popular science book for teenagers. Bronstein chose to describe spectral analysis, but it took many attempts as well as Marshak's advice to determine the best plot in which the story could relate to the history of helium.

This essay, Solar Matter (Солнечное вещество), was first published in the Koster magazine in 1934 and then in book form in April 1936. whereupon Bronstein made an inscription on a copy to Lydia Chukovskaya, his copy editor, “To my dear Lida, without whom I would have never been able to write this book.” Later, Chukovskaya wrote that the history of helium had become intertwined in her and Bronstein's life, “The work on the book brought us closer. In fact, the book got us married."
