= Russell Stannard =

British particle physicist (1931–2022)

Russell Stannard OBE (24 December 1931 – 4 July 2022) was a British high-energy particle physicist. His interests included the relationship between science and religion.

In 1986, he was awarded the Templeton Prize for "significant contributions to the field of spiritual values; in particular for contributions to greater understanding of science and religion". He was awarded the OBE for "contributions to physics, the Open University, and the popularisation of science" (1998) and the Bragg Medal and Prize of the Institute of Physics for "distinguished contributions to the teaching of physics" (1999). He was admitted as a Fellow of University College London in 2000.

He gave the 1998 Gifford Lectures on "The God Experiment". He wrote the entry on relativity for the Very Short Introductions series. Among his titles are works explaining modern physics to young readers: The Time and Space of Uncle Albert, Black Holes and Uncle Albert and Uncle Albert and the Quantum Quest.

== Early Life & Career ==
Stannard was born in London, England. He was a professor of physics at the Open University (later Professor Emeritus). He wrote books explicating science for young readers: The Time and Space of Uncle Albert' (about special relativity), Black Holes and Uncle Albert (about general relativity) and Uncle Albert and the Quantum Quest (about quantum mechanics.) The books follow Albert Einstein's (fictional) niece, Gendanken, through a series of thought experiments. He updated George Gamow's Mr Tompkins series as The New World of Mr. Tompkins.

- Studied Physics at University College London earning a B.Sc. (Special Physics) degree (1953); this was followed by a Ph.D. in cosmic ray physics (1956).
- 1960–69 Lecturer, UCL
- 1969–71 Reader, Open University
- 1971–1997 Professor of Physics, Open University.
- 1971–1992 Head of the Physics Department, Open University
- 1974–1976 Pro-Vice Chancellor, Open University
- 1987–1988 Visiting Fellow, Center of Theological Inquiry, Princeton, United States.
- 1987–1991 Vice President of the Institute of Physics.
- 1993–1999 Trustee of the John Templeton Foundation.
- 1999–2022 Emeritus Professor of Physics, Open University.

== Personal life ==
In 2008, Stannard authored Relativity for the Very Short Introductions series. In 2010, he helmed a series of ten short programes collectively entitled "Boundaries of the knowable", dealing with subjects from both scientific and philosophical perspectives, ranging from the nature of consciousness, the nature of matter, space and time, the wave-particle duality of matter, the existence of extra-terrestrial life and infinite universes, whether our universe is eternal, and the question of "What caused the Big Bang?".

Stannard was also a sculptor; two of his pieces were on display in the main quadrangle of the Open University site at Milton Keynes.

== Reception ==
Fay Dowker gave The Time and Space of Uncle Albert a favorable review in New Scientist. Alice Bell included Uncle Albert and the Quantum Quest on her list of the best science books for children.

Richard Dawkins included an excerpt from The Time and Space of Uncle Albert in The Oxford Book of Modern Science Writing.

== Publications ==
=== Science and religion ===
- Science and the Renewal of Belief
- Grounds for Reasonable Belief
- Doing Away with God?
- Science and Wonders
- contributed chapters to Evidence of Purpose, How Large is God?, and Spiritual Evolution.
- The God Experiment, Faber and Faber/HiddenSpring 1999 based on his Gifford Lectures
- The End of Discovery
- Science & Belief the Big Issues
- The Divine Imprint

=== Children's books ===
Stannard wrote eleven children's books, including:

- the Uncle Albert trilogy (The Time and Space of Uncle Albert, Black Holes and Uncle Albert, and Uncle Albert and the Quantum Quest)
- An update of George Gamow's Mr Tompkins
- The Curious History of God
- Our Physical Universe
- Virtutopia

== Sources ==
- Biography
