= Barbara Perkins Gamow =

American publicist, editor, and translator (1905–1975)

Barbara Merrihew Perkins "Perky" Gamow (May 22, 1905 – December 1975) was an American publicist, editor and translator.

== Biography ==
Barbara Merrihew Perkins was born in San Francisco, California, on May 22, 1905.

In 1938, she married J. R. de la Torre Bueno, scholar and editor, and divorced around 1943.

She mainly worked in the publishing business. From 1950 to 1958, she was a publicity manager for the Cambridge University Press.

In 1958, she married George Gamow. From 1958 to 1970, Barbara Gamow served as the editor and translator of her husband. She also wrote verse for some of her husband's books, including Faust; Eine Historie.

Her circle of friends included E. E. Cummings and his wife Marion Morehouse, Edward Niles Hooker, Albert Guerard, Stan Brakhage, John Larson, Evelyn Hooker, Bernard Friedlander, Raymong Peckham Holden, James Broughton, Charles Norman, Eda Lord, Sybille Bedford, Garner James, and Morgan Shepard.

She died in December 1975 and is buried at Green Mountain Cemetery, Boulder, Colorado.

== Legacy ==
Barbara Gamow created a fund for the Department of Physics aimed to finance the George Gamow Memorial Lecture series at the University of Colorado Boulder.

The George Gamow and Barbara Gamow Papers, 1915-1975 are hosted at the Library of Congress.
