= Eric Allin Cornell =

American physicist

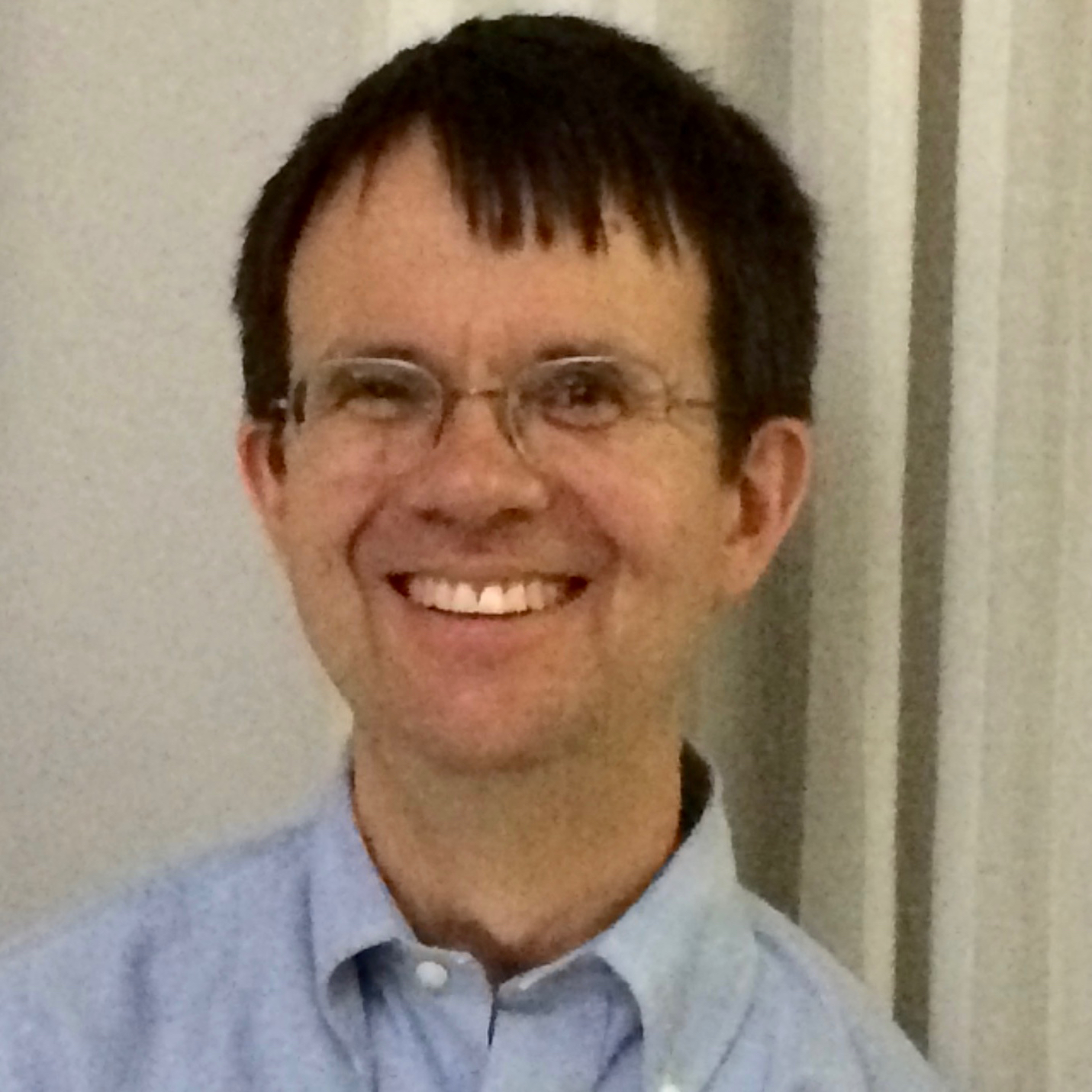
- Cornell in June 2015
- Born: December 19, 1961 (age 64); Palo Alto, California, US
- Education: Stanford University (BS); Massachusetts Institute of Technology (PhD)
- Known for: Bose–Einstein condensation
- Awards: Fritz London Memorial Prize (1996); King Faisal International Prize in Science (1997); Lorentz Medal (1998); R. W. Wood Prize (1999); Benjamin Franklin Medal in Physics (2000); Nobel Prize in Physics (2001)
- Scientific career
- Fields: Physics
- Workplaces: University of Colorado Boulder; National Institute of Standards and Technology (NIST); JILA
- Thesis: Mass spectroscopy using single ion cyclotron resonance (1990)
- Doctoral advisor: David E. Pritchard
- Doctoral students: Laura C. Sinclair

Eric Allin Cornell (born December 19, 1961) is an American physicist who, along with Carl E. Wieman, synthesized the first Bose–Einstein condensate in 1995. Cornell, Wieman and Wolfgang Ketterle shared the 2001 Nobel Prize in Physics “for the achievement of Bose-Einstein condensation in dilute gases of alkali atoms, and for early fundamental studies of the properties of the condensates”.

== Biography ==
Cornell was born in Palo Alto, California, where his parents were completing graduate degrees at nearby Stanford University. Two years later he moved to Cambridge, Massachusetts, where his father was a professor of civil engineering at MIT. Here he grew up with his younger brother and sister, with year-long stints in Berkeley, California, and Lisbon, Portugal, accompanying his father whilst on sabbatical.

In Cambridge he attended Cambridge Rindge and Latin School. The year before his graduation he moved back to California with his mother and finished high school at San Francisco's Lowell High School, a local magnet school for academically talented students.

After high school he enrolled at Stanford University, where he was to meet his future wife, Celeste Landry. As an undergraduate he earned money as an assistant in the various low-temperature physics groups on campus. He was doing well both in his courses and his jobs in the labs and seemed set for a career in physics. He however doubted whether he wished to pursue such a career, or rather a different one in literature or politics. Halfway through his undergraduate years he went to China and Taiwan for nine months to volunteer teaching conversational English and to study Chinese. He returned to Stanford with the intent to study physics. He graduated with honors and distinction in 1985.

For graduate school he returned to MIT. There he joined David Pritchard's group, which had a running experiment that tried to measure the mass of the electron neutrino from the beta decay of tritium. Although he was unable to determine the mass of the neutrino, Cornell did obtain his PhD in 1990.

After obtaining his doctorate he joined Carl Wieman at the University of Colorado Boulder as a postdoctoral researcher on a small laser cooling experiment. During his two years as a postdoc he came up with a plan to combine laser cooling and evaporative cooling in a magnetic trap to create a Bose–Einstein condensate (BEC). Based on his proposal he was offered a permanent position at JILA/NIST in Boulder. In 1995 Cornell and Wieman gave the University of Colorado's George Gamow Memorial Lecture. For synthesizing the first Bose–Einstein condensate in 1995, Cornell, Wieman, and Wolfgang Ketterle shared the Nobel Prize in Physics in 2001. In 1997, Deborah S. Jin joined Cornell's group at JILA, where she led the team that produced the fermionic condensate in 2003.

He is currently a professor at the University of Colorado Boulder and a physicist (NIST fellow) at the United States Department of Commerce National Institute of Standards and Technology. His lab is located at JILA. He was awarded the Lorentz Medal in 1998 and is a Fellow of the American Association for the Advancement of Science.

He was elected a Fellow of the American Academy of Arts and Sciences in 2005.

== Awards and honors ==
Cornell received multiple awards including the Nobel Prize in Physics in 2001.

- Ioannes Marcus Marci Medal for Molecular Spectroscopy, Ioannes Marcus Marci Spectroscopic Society, Czech Republic, 2012
- Fellow, American Academy of Arts & Sciences, 2005
- Nobel Prize in Physics, 2001
- Member, National Academy of Sciences, 2000
- Fellow, Optical Society of America, Elected 2000
- R. W. Wood Prize, Optical Society of America, 1999
- Benjamin Franklin Medal in Physics, 1999
- Lorentz Medal, Royal Netherlands Academy of Arts and Sciences, 1998
- Fellow, The American Physical Society, Elected 1997
- I. I. Rabi Prize in Atomic, Molecular and Optical Physics, American Physical Society, 1997
- King Faisal International Prize in Science, 1997
- National Science Foundation Alan T. Waterman Award, 1997
- Carl Zeiss Award, Ernst Abbe Fund, 1996
- Fritz London Prize in Low Temperature Physics, 1996
- Department of Commerce Gold Medal, 1996
- Presidential Early Career Award in Science and Engineering, 1996
- Newcomb-Cleveland Prize, American Association for the Advancement of Science, 1995–96
- George Gamow Memorial Lecture, 1995
- Samuel Wesley Stratton Award, National Institute of Science and Technology, 1995

== Personal life ==
Cornell married Celeste Landry in 1995 mere months before the BEC experiment succeeded. Their first daughter was born in 1996, and their second daughter in 1998.

In October 2004, his left arm and shoulder were amputated in an attempt to stop the spread of necrotizing fasciitis. He was discharged from the hospital in mid-December, having recovered from the infection, and returned to work part-time in April 2005. Cornell has run in the Bolder Boulder several times since moving to Boulder in 1990, most recently in 2022.

== See also ==
- Timeline of low-temperature technology

== Bibliography ==
- Frängsmyr, Tore (2002). Les Prix Nobel: The Nobel Prizes 2001. Stockholm: Nobel Foundation.
