= Laura C. Sinclair =

American physicist

Laura C. Sinclair is an American physicist at the National Institute of Standards and Technology whose research combines optics and metrology. She is known for her development of optical frequency combs and their applications in remote sensing of air pollution and in time and frequency transfer, the process of establishing synchronized reference timeframes across large distances.

== Education and career ==
Sinclair is originally from California, and is a 2004 graduate of the California Institute of Technology. She completed her Ph.D. in 2011 at the University of Colorado Boulder. Her 2011 doctoral dissertation, Development of Frequency Comb Velocity-Modulation Spectroscopy, Spectroscopy of HfF^{+} and the JILA eEDM Experiment, was supervised by Eric Allin Cornell.

She remained in Boulder as a postdoctoral researcher at the National Institute of Standards and Technology (NIST), with the support of the National Research Council, and then became a permanent staff member at NIST. She also holds an adjoint faculty position in the department of Electrical, Computer & Energy Engineering at CU Boulder.

== Recognition ==
Sinclair was named as the January 2017 Woman Physicist of the Month by the American Physical Society, and was a 2017 recipient of the Presidential Early Career Award for Scientists and Engineers, "recognized for creating a suite of some of the world’s best optical tools that bring precision measurement out of well-controlled laboratory environments and into the field for such applications as long-distance time transfer and detection of airborne contaminants in turbulent environments". She was part of a group that received the 2019 NIST Gold Medal Award for their work in creating a network of synchronized atomic clocks.

She was a 2024 recipient of the Arthur S. Flemming Award, given by the Trachtenberg School of Public Policy and Public Administration for excellent performance by early-career government employees, honored "for her pioneering research in femtosecond free-space optical time-transfer". She was named as a 2026 Fellow of Optica, "for pioneering femtosecond free-space time-transfer, enabling unprecedented precision in the comparison of optical clocks over hundreds of kilometers".
