= Alpher–Bethe–Gamow paper =

Scientific theory of the origin of chemical elements

In physical cosmology, the Alpher–Bethe–Gamow paper, or αβγ paper, was created by Ralph Alpher, then a physics PhD student, his advisor George Gamow, and Hans Bethe. The work, which would become the subject of Alpher's PhD dissertation, argued that the Big Bang would create hydrogen, helium and heavier elements in the correct proportions to explain their abundance in the early universe. While the original theory neglected a number of processes important to the formation of heavy elements, subsequent developments showed that Big Bang nucleosynthesis is consistent with the observed constraints on all primordial elements.

Formally titled "The Origin of Chemical Elements", it was published in the April 1948 issue of Physical Review.

== Bethe's name ==
Gamow humorously decided to add the name of his friend—the eminent physicist Hans Bethe—to this paper in order to create the whimsical author list of Alpher, Bethe, Gamow, a play on the Greek letters α, β, and γ (alpha, beta, gamma). Bethe (German pronunciation: [ˈbeːtə]) was listed in the article as "H. Bethe, Cornell University, Ithaca, New York". In his 1952 book The Creation of the Universe, Gamow explained Hans Bethe's association with the theory thus:

The αβγ paper with the figure referred to in the text

The results of these calculations were first announced in a letter to The Physical Review, April 1, 1948. This was signed Alpher, Bethe, and Gamow, and is often referred to as the 'alphabetical article'. It seemed unfair to the Greek alphabet to have the article signed by Alpher and Gamow only, and so the name of Dr. Hans A. Bethe (in absentia) was inserted in preparing the manuscript for print. Dr. Bethe, who received a copy of the manuscript, did not object, and, as a matter of fact, was quite helpful in subsequent discussions. There was, however, a rumor that later, when the alpha, beta, gamma theory went temporarily on the rocks, Dr. Bethe seriously considered changing his name to Zacharias. The close fit of the calculated curve and the observed abundances is shown in Fig. 15, which represents the results of later calculations carried out on the electronic computer of the National Bureau of Standards by Ralph Alpher and R. C. Herman (who stubbornly refuses to change his name to Delter).

After this, Bethe did work on Big Bang nucleosynthesis.

Alpher, at the time only a graduate student, was generally dismayed by the inclusion of Bethe's name on this paper. He felt that the inclusion of another eminent physicist would overshadow his personal contribution to this work and prevent him from receiving proper recognition for such an important discovery. He expressed resentment over Gamow's whimsy as late as 1999.

== Main shortcoming of the theory ==
The theory originally proposed that all atomic nuclei are produced by the successive capture of neutrons, one mass unit at a time. However, later study challenged the universality of the successive-capture theory. No element was found to have a stable isotope with an atomic mass of five or eight. Physicists soon noticed that these mass gaps would hinder the production of elements beyond helium. Just as it is impossible to climb a staircase one step at a time when one of the steps is missing, this discovery meant that the successive-capture theory could not account for higher elements.

It was eventually recognized that most of the heavy elements observed in the present universe are the result of stellar nucleosynthesis in stars, a theory first suggested by Arthur Stanley Eddington, given credence by Hans Bethe, and quantitatively developed by Fred Hoyle and a number of other scientists.

However, the Alpher–Bethe–Gamow theory does correctly explain the relative abundances of the isotopes of hydrogen and helium. Taken together, these account for more than 99% of the baryonic mass of the universe. Today, nucleosynthesis is widely considered to have taken place in two stages: formation of hydrogen and helium according to the Alpher–Bethe–Gamow theory, and stellar nucleosynthesis of higher elements according to Bethe and Hoyle's later theories.
