= Ruth Fitzmayer Schwarz =

American physicist

Ruth Fitzmayer Schwarz (July 12, 1925 – August 26, 2004) was an American physicist known for her work on semiconductors in the electronics industry.

== Early life and education ==
Schwarz was originally from Louisville, Kentucky, where she went to Atherton High School, Louisville, becoming student body president and graduating with first honors in 1943. She stayed in Louisville for undergraduate study at the University of Louisville. Initially she majored in political science but she switched to mathematics and science after becoming inspired by a first-year mathematics course taught there by Walter Lee Moore, the namesake of the university's Moore Observatory.

She went on to Harvard University for graduate study in physics, working there on the magnetic behavior of molecules with John Hasbrouck Van Vleck, who later won the Nobel Prize for his work on magnetism. She earned a master's degree there, through Radcliffe College, in 1949, and completed her Ph.D. in 1953. Her dissertation was Rotational magnetic moments in polyatomic molecules.

== Career and later life ==
Schwarz became a scientist for transistor manufacturer Philco in 1952, initially modeling the flow of heat in their manufacturing processes. She worked for them in their scientific laboratory in Blue Bell, Pennsylvania, and shifted to part-time work after the birth of her children. In the 1970s she worked in the Space Division of General Electric.

== Personal life ==
Schwarz was the daughter of Lawrence J. Fitzmayer, who taught music at public schools in Louisville and played violin for the Louisville Philharmonic Orchestra. She maintained a lifelong interest in music, playing violin herself in her high school orchestra, and for nearly three decades with the Old York Road Symphony beginning circa 1967.

She met her husband, physicist John Schwarz, at the University of Louisville; they both studied at Harvard, worked at Philco and married in 1950. They had two sons and a daughter.

== Recognition ==
Philco gave Schwarz their Presidential Special Award. Schwarz was named a Fellow of the American Physical Society in 1963.
