= 10 years without the right of correspondence =

Euphemism for execution in Stalin's Soviet Union

"10 years without the right of correspondence" (Russian: Десять лет без права переписки, romanized: Desyat' let bez prava perepiski) was a clause that appeared in sentences of many victims of political repression during the Stalinist Great Purges in the Soviet Union. It implied a death sentence. It was used to keep family relatives of those executed uncertain as to the fate or whereabouts of the victims.

== Meaning ==
"10 years without the right of correspondence" was used as a euphemism to cover the true nature of a court sentence.

In many cases during the late 1930s 'Great Purge' campaign of political repression, the sentence "10 years of corrective labor camps without the right of correspondence" was announced to relatives, while the paperwork contained the real sentence: "the highest degree of punishment: execution by shooting". Many people did not understand the official euphemism and incorrectly believed that their relative was still alive in prison.

As Alexander Solzhenitsyn put it in The Gulag Archipelago:

"Deprived of the right to correspond." And that means once and for all. "No right to correspondence"—and that almost for certain means: "Has been shot."

For example, all of the bodies identified from the mass graves at Vinnytsia and Kuropaty were of those people that had received "10 years without the right of correspondence".

== Notable victims ==
- Mikhail Koltsov (a Soviet writer and correspondent, referred in Hemingway's For Whom the Bell Tolls), executed February 2, 1940. When his brother, Boris Efimov, by a miracle got an appointment with Vasiliy Ulrikh, the latter told him that Koltsov was such sentenced.
- Matvei Petrovich Bronstein (executed in 1937), theoretical physicist and a pioneer of quantum gravity.
- Volodymyr Zatonsky (executed 29 July 1938), Ukrainian Soviet leader

== In culture ==
In 1990 Russian film director Vladimir Naumov shot a Russian-German film with this title. based on the novel Ударом на удар, или Подход Кристаповича by Aleksandr Kabakov.

== See also ==
- Nacht und Nebel
- By administrative means
