= Robert Herman =

American astronomer (1914–1997)

Robert Herman (August 29, 1914 – February 13, 1997) was an American astronomer, best known for his work with Ralph Alpher in 1948–50, on estimating the temperature of cosmic microwave background radiation from the Big Bang explosion.

== Biography and career ==
Born in the Bronx, New York City, Herman graduated cum laude with special honors in physics from the City College of New York in 1935, and in 1940 was awarded master's and doctoral degrees in physics from Princeton University in the area of molecular spectroscopy. As a graduate student, Herman already exhibited eclectic tendencies in diverse fields by also working in solid state physics, as well as straddling theory and experiment. He spent the academic year 1940-41 working on the Bush differential analyzer at the Moore School of Electrical Engineering, University of Pennsylvania, and another year teaching physics at the City College of New York.

In 1942, he left teaching to work at the Department of Terrestrial Magnetism, the Carnegie Institution of Washington, D.C., and applied, all research centers for the war effort. He worked on such problems as the proximity fuse for naval antiaircraft gunfire, which was used effectively during the war. It was then that Herman became intrigued with defining and solving complex problems. He shifted his attention from theory and laboratory work and became deeply involved with field testing of the proximity device and the operational problems associated with its use in the fleet. In 1945, he received the Naval Ordnance Development Award.

After World War II, Herman spent another decade at the Johns Hopkins Applied Physics Lab pursuing research in spectroscopy and condensed-matter physics. It was during this period that he and Ralph Alpher did their now famous work on cosmology. In 1948, as a consequence of their studies of nucleosynthesis in the early expanding Big Bang universe model, they made the first theoretical prediction of the existence of a residual, homogeneous, isotopic, blackbody radiation (cosmic microwave background radiation) that pervades the universe as a vestige of the initial Big Bang explosion.

This work received some notice at the time, but soon fell into obscurity. In 1964, the radiation was accidentally detected by two scientists, Arno Penzias and Robert Woodrow Wilson at the Bell Telephone Laboratories in Murray Hill, New Jersey, while trying to correct a malfunction in a radio dish. After eliminating every conceivable source of interference, they concluded that the radiation source was not of earthly origin. After learning about this work, a group of physicists from Princeton University interpreted it as background radiation of cosmic origin, but without reference to the two 1948 papers, one by Alpher, Bethe and Gamow (therefore sometimes called the α-β-γ paper) and the other by Alpher and Herman. The Big Bang model for the origin of the universe became widely accepted, and in 1978 a Nobel Prize was awarded to Bell scientists Penzias and Wilson for their detection of the cosmic background radiation. When recalling the culmination of this series of events, Herman remarked graciously, "You don't give recognition to the person; you give it to the work."

Nevertheless, the team of Herman and Alpher were eventually recognized for their pioneering contribution. In 1993, the National Academy of Sciences announced that they would share the Henry Draper Medal, the oldest award of the Academy, for their contributions to astronomical physics. They were recognized "for their insight and skill in developing a physical model of the evolution of the universe and in predicting the existence of a microwave background radiation years before this radiation was serendipitously discovered; through this work they were participants in one of the major intellectual achievements of the 20th century." They also received the Magellanic Premium of the American Philosophical Society, the John Price Wetherill Medal of the Franklin Institute, and the Georges Vanderlinden Prix of the Belgian Royal Academy.

In 1956, Herman joined the General Motors Research Laboratory, as head of the basic science group, later renamed the theoretical physics department. He introduced science into the affairs of his employer by inventing a new science, traffic science. Drawing upon his background in physics, he first directed his attention to the description of the microscopic behavior of traffic: the detailed manner in which individual drivers avoid coinciding with each other in space and time, at least most of the time.

In the late 1950s and early 1960s, Herman joined with Elliott Waters Montroll and others in developing the car-following theory of traffic flow, a theory that has stood the test of time and is still the state of the art today. Shortly thereafter, Herman and Ilya Prigogine, a future Nobel Laureate, developed a theory of multilane traffic flow. For more than thirty-five years, Herman moved into diverse fields of traffic science, always leaving his characteristic mark of excellence. In recent years, he worked with his students and colleagues to develop a "two-fluid model of town traffic," a description of vehicular traffic on urban road networks, an extension of the theory that he formulated with Prigogine some years before. This theory, along with his earlier work, has been significant in the development of the now-emerging Intelligent Transportation Systems concept.

In 1979, Herman joined the faculty of the University of Texas at Austin, with a joint appointment as professor of physics, in the Center for Studies in Statistical Mechanics, and the L.P. Gilvin Professor in Civil Engineering. He later became the L.P. Gilvin Centennial Professor Emeritus in Civil Engineering. He was elected a Fellow of the American Academy of Arts and Sciences in 1979.

In his spare time, Herman was known to ponder the physics of musical instruments, such as the mechanics of a cello bow and the acoustics of the English flute. He played and collected antique cellos.

In the mid 1980s, he began creating small sculptures from exotic woods and metals. For the next decade, he pursued this creative and meaningful quest to find the least-mediated, least-quantifiable relation between matter and the imagination. An exhibition of several of his carvings was presented at the National Academy of Engineering in Washington, D.C., in 1994, at the College of Engineering at the University of Texas at Austin in 1995, and at the Leu Art Gallery of Belmont University in Nashville, Tennessee, in 1996.

During the last several years of his life, Herman grew increasingly concerned about the state of education in the United States, the changing yet increasingly critical role of the university in society, the increasing encroachment of political considerations on the education and research enterprise, the constant attacks on academic freedom, and the continuing erosion of the base upon which the nation's great achievements in science and technology have been attained. In his last two years, he busily compiled and analyzed data on all sorts of performance indicators of quality and productivity of university departments. This was part of a broader effort to model universities as complex systems.

Herman died in Austin, Texas, on February 13, 1997.
