= The Birth and Death of the Sun =

Book by George Gamow

- Cover of the first edition
- Author: George Gamow
- Illustrator: George Gamow
- Subject: Popular science Astronomy
- Published: 1940
- Publisher: Viking Press
- Media type: Print
- Pages: 280
- OCLC: 804206
- LC Class: QB44 .G26
- Text: The Birth and Death of the Sun at Internet Archive

The Birth and Death of the Sun is a popular science book by theoretical physicist and cosmologist George Gamow, first published in 1940, exploring atomic chemistry, stellar evolution, and cosmology. The book is illustrated by Gamow. It was revised in 1952.

== Reception ==
Critical reception has been positive. In February 1941, Gerard F. W. Mulders gave a favorable review for The Birth and Death of the Sun, writing that "[i]t gives authentic information in nontechnical language from which mathematical formulae have been eliminated. The entertaining presentation of the most modern developments in physics and astrophysics, the sparkling humor, and the original drawings and graphs will be enjoyed by scientist and amateur alike."

In April 2015, physicist and Nobel laureate Steven Weinberg included The Birth and Death of the Sun in a personal list of "the 13 best science books for the general reader".

== See also ==
- Formation and evolution of the Solar System
