= Mr Tompkins =

Fictional character in the Mr. Tompkins books (1940–1967)

Mr Tompkins is the title character in a series of four popular science books by the physicist George Gamow, which were published from 1940. The books are structured as a series of dreams in which Mr Tompkins enters alternative worlds where the physical constants have radically different values from those they have in the real world. Gamow aims to use these changes to explain modern scientific theories.

Mr Tompkins' adventures begin when he chooses to spend the afternoon of a bank holiday attending a lecture on the theory of relativity. The lecture proves less comprehensible than he had hoped. He drifts off to sleep and enters a dream world in which the speed of light is a mere 4.5 m/s (10 mph). This becomes apparent to him as passing cyclists are subject to a noticeable Lorentz–FitzGerald contraction. Mr Tompkins becomes acquainted with the professor delivering the lectures and ultimately marries the professor's daughter, Maud. Later chapters in the books deal with atomic structure (Mr Tompkins spends time as a conduction electron, returning to consciousness when he is annihilated in an encounter with a positron), and thermodynamics (the Professor expounds an analogy between the second law of thermodynamics and the bias towards a gambling casino before being confounded by a local reversal of the second law through the intervention of Maxwell's demon who has introduced himself to Maud in one of her dreams). Mr Tompkins' initials are "C.G.H." which stand for c (the speed of light), G (the Newtonian constant of gravitation) and h (the Planck constant). Following their marriage Maud refers to him as "Cyril".

Later books in the series tackled biology and advanced cosmology.

In 2010 the first volume of a proposed ten-issue comic book series, The Adventures of Mr. Tompkins, was created by George Gamow's son Igor, and illustrator Scorpio Steele. Here Tompkins learns about relativity from Albert Einstein, radioactivity from Marie Curie and the structure of the atom from Ernest Rutherford. A second volume, in which Tompkins meets Charles Darwin, Gregor Mendel and James Watson, was published in July 2011.

Main belt asteroid 12448 Mr. Tompkins is named after Tompkins.

The Scientific Background to the 2017 Nobel Prize in Chemistry begins by citing Mr Tompkins Inside Himself.

The University of Akron produced a film adaptation of this story starring Prof. Alan Neville Gent, which is available on YouTube: here.

== Books in the series ==
- 1940: Mr Tompkins in Wonderland, originally published 1938 in serial form in Discovery magazine (UK)
- 1945: Mr Tompkins Explores the Atom
- 1965: Mr Tompkins in Paperback, combines Mr Tompkins in Wonderland with Mr Tompkins Explores the Atom
- 1953: Mr Tompkins Learns the Facts of Life, about biology
- 1967: Mr. Tompkins Inside Himself, coauthor Martynas Yčas revised Mr Tompkins Learns the Facts of Life giving a broader view of biology, including recent developments in molecular biology
- 1993: Canto edition Mr Tompkins in Paperback, foreword by Roger Penrose, Cambridge University Press
- 1999: The New World of Mr Tompkins, coauthor Russell Stannard updated Mr Tompkins in Paperback (ISBN 9780521630092 hardcover)
