= Ralph Alpher =

American cosmologist (1921–2007)

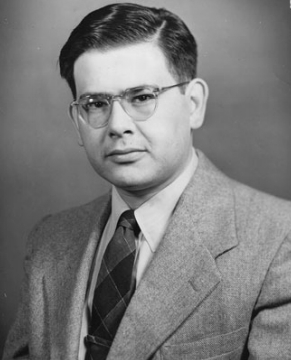
- Alpher in 1950
- Born: Ralph Asher Alpher; February 3, 1921; Washington, D.C., U.S.
- Died: August 12, 2007 (aged 86); Austin, Texas, U.S.
- Education: George Washington University
- Known for: First modern physical theory of nucleosynthesis and prediction of the Cosmic Microwave Background Radiation in 1948.
- Awards: Magellanic Premium (1975); Henry Draper Medal (1993); National Medal of Science (2005)
- Scientific career
- Fields: Cosmology, Theoretical Physics and Astrophysics
- Workplaces: Johns Hopkins University Applied Physics Laboratory, General Electric Research and Development Center, Union College, Dudley Observatory
- Doctoral advisor: Georg Antonovich Gamow

Ralph Asher Alpher (February 3, 1921 – August 12, 2007) was an American cosmologist, who carried out pioneering work in the early 1950s on the Big Bang model, including Big Bang nucleosynthesis and predictions of the cosmic microwave background radiation.

== Childhood and education ==
Alpher was the son of a Jewish immigrant, Samuel Alpher (né Ilfirovich), from Vitebsk, Russian Empire. His mother, Rose Maleson, died of stomach cancer in 1938, and his father later remarried. Alpher graduated at age 16 from Theodore Roosevelt High School in Washington, D.C., and was second in command of his school's Cadet program. He worked in the high school theater as a secretary for the principal and as a stage manager, supplementing his family's Depression-era income.

From 1938-1940 he worked as a secretary for the Department of Terrestrial Magnetism of the Carnegie Foundation, where he helped Dr. Scott Forbush analyze cosmic-ray data. Part of his work there also included typing up the transactions of the American Geophysical Union. During World War II he worked for the Naval Ordnance Laboratory (1940-1944) under John Bardeen on a project to protect ships from magnetic mines.

He contributed to the development of the Mark 32 and Mark 45 detonators, torpedoes, Naval gun control, Magnetic Airborne Detection (of submarines), and other top-secret ordnance work (including the Manhattan Project), and he was recognized at the end of the War with the Naval Ordnance Development Award (December 10, 1945 — with Symbol), and another Naval Ordnance Development award in 1946. Alpher's war time work been somewhat obscured by security classification.

From 1944 through 1955, he was employed at the Applied Physics Laboratory (APL). During the daytime he was involved in the development of ballistic missiles, guidance systems, supersonics, and related subjects.

He earned his bachelor's degree and advanced graduate degrees in physics from George Washington University, all the while working as a physicist on contract to the Navy, and eventually for the Johns Hopkins University APL. At George Washington University he met Russian-Ukrainian physicist George Gamow, who subsequently took him on as his doctoral student. Gamow was a prominent Soviet defector and one of the luminaries on the GWU faculty. Alpher provided much needed mathematical ability to support Gamow's theorizing.

Alpher wrote his doctoral thesis, Origin and Relative Abundance of the Chemical Elements, in 1948 about a theory of nucleosynthesis called neutron capture. From then onward he collaborated with Dr. Robert C. Herman, whom he met at APL, on predictions of the cosmic microwave background radiation. These predictions were later observationally confirmed by Arno Allan Penzias and Robert Wilson at Bell Labs using a horn radio telescope.

While attending GWU, Alpher met Louise Ellen Simons, who was majoring in psychology at night school and working as a day secretary with the State Department. Nearly two months after the attack on Pearl Harbor, Alpher and Louise were married. At this time he had already done classified work for the U.S. Navy through the Carnegie Institution for nearly one and a half years. During a hiatus in his scientific work in early 1944, he did apply to the Navy for a commission, for which he was eligible. By this time he had done so much classified and secret work that he was no longer subject to the draft (along with about 7,000 others), and was prohibited from enlistment. That summer, he signed on to APL at Johns Hopkins University to work on another classified project — a new magnetic-influence torpedo exploder. This was badly needed since the Mark 14 torpedo, which had a poorly tested exploder that had its magnetic component turned off by order of the chief of Naval Operations in late 1943, was badly in need of replacement (V.S. Alpher, The Submarine Review, October 2009).

== Big Bang nucleosynthesis theory ==
Alpher's dissertation in 1948 dealt with a subject that came to be known as Big Bang nucleosynthesis. Nucleosynthesis is the explanation of how more complex elements are created out of simple elements in the moments following the Big Bang. Right after the Big Bang, when the temperature was extremely high, if any nuclear particles, such as neutrons and protons, became bound together (being held together by the attractive nuclear force) they would be immediately broken apart by the high energy photons (quanta of light) present in high density. In other words, at this extremely high temperature, the photons' kinetic energy would overwhelm the binding energy of the strong nuclear force. For example, if a proton and a neutron became bound together (forming deuterium), it would be immediately broken apart by a high energy photon. However, as time progressed, the universe expanded and cooled and the average energy of the photons decreased. At some point, roughly one second after the Big Bang, the attractive force of nuclear attraction would begin to win out over the lower energy photons and neutrons and protons would begin to form stable deuterium nuclei. As the universe continued to expand and cool, additional nuclear particles would bind with these light nuclei, building up heavier elements such as helium, etc.

Alpher argued that the Big Bang would create hydrogen, helium and heavier elements in the correct proportions to explain their abundance in the early universe. Alpher and Gamow's theory originally proposed that all atomic nuclei are produced by the successive capture of neutrons, one mass unit at a time. However, later studies challenged the universality of the successive capture theory, since no element was found to have a stable isotope with an atomic mass of five or eight, hindering the production of elements beyond helium. It was eventually recognized that most of the heavy elements observed in the present universe are the result of stellar nucleosynthesis in stars, a theory largely developed by Hans Bethe, William Fowler and Subrahmanyan Chandrasekhar. Bethe had been a last minute addition to Alpher's dissertation examining committee.

Since Alpher's dissertation was perceived to be ground-breaking, over 300 people attended the dissertation defense, including the press, and articles about his predictions and a Herblock cartoon appeared in major newspapers. This was quite unusual for a doctoral dissertation.

Later the same year, collaborating with Robert Herman, Alpher predicted the temperature of the residual radiation known as cosmic microwave background radiation resulting from the hypothesized Big Bang. However, Alpher's predictions concerning the cosmic background radiation were more or less forgotten until they were rediscovered by Robert Dicke and Yakov Zel'dovich in the early 1960s. The existence of the cosmic background radiation and its temperature were measured experimentally in 1964 by two physicists working for Bell Laboratories in New Jersey, Arno Penzias and Robert Wilson, who were awarded the Nobel Prize in Physics for this work in 1978.

Elements of Alpher's independent dissertation were first published on April 1, 1948 in the Physical Review with three authors: Alpher, Hans Bethe and Gamow. Although his name appears on the paper, Bethe had no direct part in the development of the theory, although he later worked on related topics; Gamow added his name to make the author list Alpher, Bethe, Gamow, a pun on alpha, beta, gamma (α, β, γ), the first three letters of the Greek alphabet. Gamow joked that "There was, however, a rumor that later, when the alpha, beta, gamma theory went temporarily on the rocks, Bethe seriously considered changing his name to Zacharias". When referring to Robert Herman he wrote: "R. C. Herman, who stubbornly refuses to change his name to Delter." Alpher worried that the humor engendered by Gamow may have obscured his own critical role in developing the theory. With the award of the 2005 National Medal of Science, Alpher's original work on nucleosynthesis and the cosmic microwave background radiation prediction was recognised.

Alpher and Robert Herman were awarded the Henry Draper Medal from the National Academy of Sciences in 1993. They were also awarded the Magellanic Premium of the American Philosophical Society in 1975, the Georges Vanderlinden Physics prize of the Belgian Academy of Sciences, as well as significant awards of the New York Academy of Sciences and the Franklin Institute of Philadelphia. Two Nobel Prizes in physics have been awarded for empirical work related to the cosmic background radiation — in 1978 to Arno Penzias and Robert Wilson and in 2006 to John Mather and George Smoot. Alpher and Herman (the latter, posthumously) published their own account of their work in cosmology in 2001, Genesis of the Big Bang (Oxford University Press). Published as a trade book, it received little promotion or sales in the first edition.

He was elected a Fellow of the American Academy of Arts and Sciences in 1986. In 2005 Alpher was awarded the National Medal of Science. The citation for the award reads "For his unprecedented work in the areas of nucleosynthesis, for the prediction that universe expansion leaves behind background radiation, and for providing the model for the Big Bang theory." The medal was presented to his son, Dr. Victor S. Alpher, on July 27, 2007 by President George W. Bush, as his father could not travel to receive the award.

== Later career ==
In 1955, Alpher moved to a position with the General Electric Company's Research and Development Center. His primary role in his early years there was working on problems of vehicle re-entry from space.

In 1955, both Alpher and Herman applied for positions at Iowa, where van Allen was now department chair, however, the salaries in academia were simply too low by comparison with industrial pay. Alpher also continued to collaborate with Robert Herman, who had moved to the General Motors Research Laboratory, on problems in cosmology. The Cosmic Microwave Background Radiation was finally confirmed in 1964, although in retrospect many other astronomers and radio astronomers probably observed it without recognizing the cosmological significance.

From 1987 to 2004, he served as distinguished research professor of physics and astronomy at Union College in Schenectady, New York, during which time he was able to return to research and teaching. During all this time he continued to publish major peer-reviewed scientific papers and was active in community service for Public Broadcasting. Alpher was also (1987–2004) director of the Dudley Observatory.

In 1986, he was recognized with the Distinguished Alumnus Achievement Award of the George Washington University. All of his degrees were achieved by studying at night, whilst working for the Navy and Johns Hopkins APL during the daytime. In 2004 he joined the emeritus faculty at Union and was emeritus director of Dudley. He also received honorary Doctor of Science degrees from Union College and the Rensselaer Polytechnic Institute.

== Approach to science ==
Alpher told Joseph D'Agnese in his interview for Discover Magazine, "There are two reasons you do science. One is the altruistic feeling that maybe you can contribute to mankind's store of knowledge about the world. The other and more personal thing is you want the approbation of your peers. Pure and simple."

== Personal life and views ==
Despite raising a Jewish family, Alpher considered himself to be agnostic and humanist.

== Family ==
He and his wife, Louise, had two children and two grandchildren.

== Death ==
Alpher died following an extended illness on August 12, 2007. He had been in failing health since falling and breaking his hip in February 2007.

== See also ==
- List of Jewish American physicists
- Nobel Prize controversies
