= John Hasbrouck Van Vleck =

American physicist and mathematician (1899–1980)

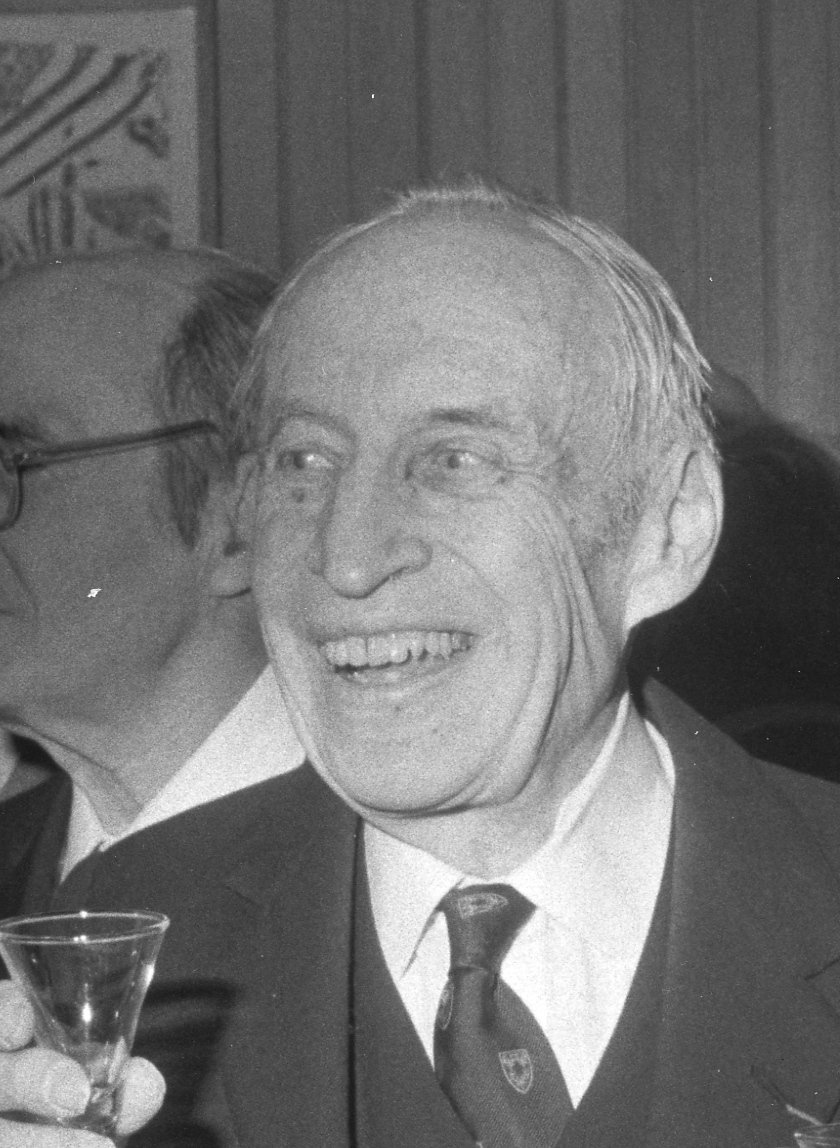
- Van Vleck in 1979
- Born: March 13, 1899; Middletown, Connecticut, U.S.
- Died: October 27, 1980 (aged 81); Cambridge, Massachusetts, U.S.
- Resting place: Forest Hill Cemetery
- Education: University of Wisconsin–Madison (AB); Harvard University (PhD)
- Known for: Crystal field theory; Van Vleck paramagnetism; Van Vleck transformations; Van Vleck formula (propagator)
- Spouse: Abigail Pearson (m. 1927)
- Father: Edward Burr Van Vleck
- Relatives: John Monroe Van Vleck (grandfather)
- Awards: Irving Langmuir Award (1965); National Medal of Science (1966); ForMemRS (1967); Elliott Cresson Medal (1971); Lorentz Medal (1974); Nobel Prize in Physics (1977)
- Scientific career
- Fields: Physics
- Workplaces: University of Minnesota; University of Wisconsin–Madison; Harvard University; University of Oxford; Balliol College, Oxford
- Doctoral advisor: Edwin C. Kemble
- Doctoral students: See list: Philip W. Anderson; John Atanasoff; Richard Bersohn; Robert Finkelstein; Thomas Kuhn; Edward Mills Purcell; Carol Jane Anger Rieke; Arianna W. Rosenbluth; Robert Serber; Ruth Fitzmayer Schwarz; H. Eugene Stanley; Amelia Frank
- Other notable students: John Bardeen

John Hasbrouck Van Vleck (/væn vlɛk/; March 13, 1899 – October 27, 1980) was an American physicist and mathematician who won the Nobel Prize in Physics in 1977 for his contributions to the understanding of the behavior of electronic magnetism in solids. He shared the Prize with Philip W. Anderson and Nevill Mott.

J. H. Van Vleck established the fundamentals of the quantum mechanical theory of magnetism, crystal field theory and ligand field theory (chemical bonding in metal complexes). He is regarded as the Father of Modern Magnetism.

== Early life and education ==
John Hasbrouck Van Vleck was born on March 13, 1899, to mathematician Edward Burr Van Vleck and Hester L. Raymond in Middletown, Connecticut, while his father was an assistant professor at Wesleyan University, and where his grandfather, astronomer John Monroe Van Vleck, was also a professor. He grew up in Madison, Wisconsin, and received an A.B. degree from the University of Wisconsin in 1920, before earning his Ph.D. at Harvard University in 1922 under the supervision of Edwin C. Kemble.

== Career and research ==
He joined the University of Minnesota as an assistant professor in 1923, then moved to the University of Wisconsin before settling at Harvard. He also earned Honorary D. Sc., or D. Honoris Causa, degree from Wesleyan University in 1936.

During World War II, J. H. Van Vleck worked on radar at the MIT Radiation Lab. He was half time at the Radiation Lab and half time on the staff at Harvard. He showed that at about 1.25-centimeter wavelength water molecules in the atmosphere would lead to troublesome absorption and that at 0.5-centimeter wavelength there would be a similar absorption by oxygen molecules. This was to have important consequences not just for military (and civil) radar systems but later for the new science of radioastronomy.

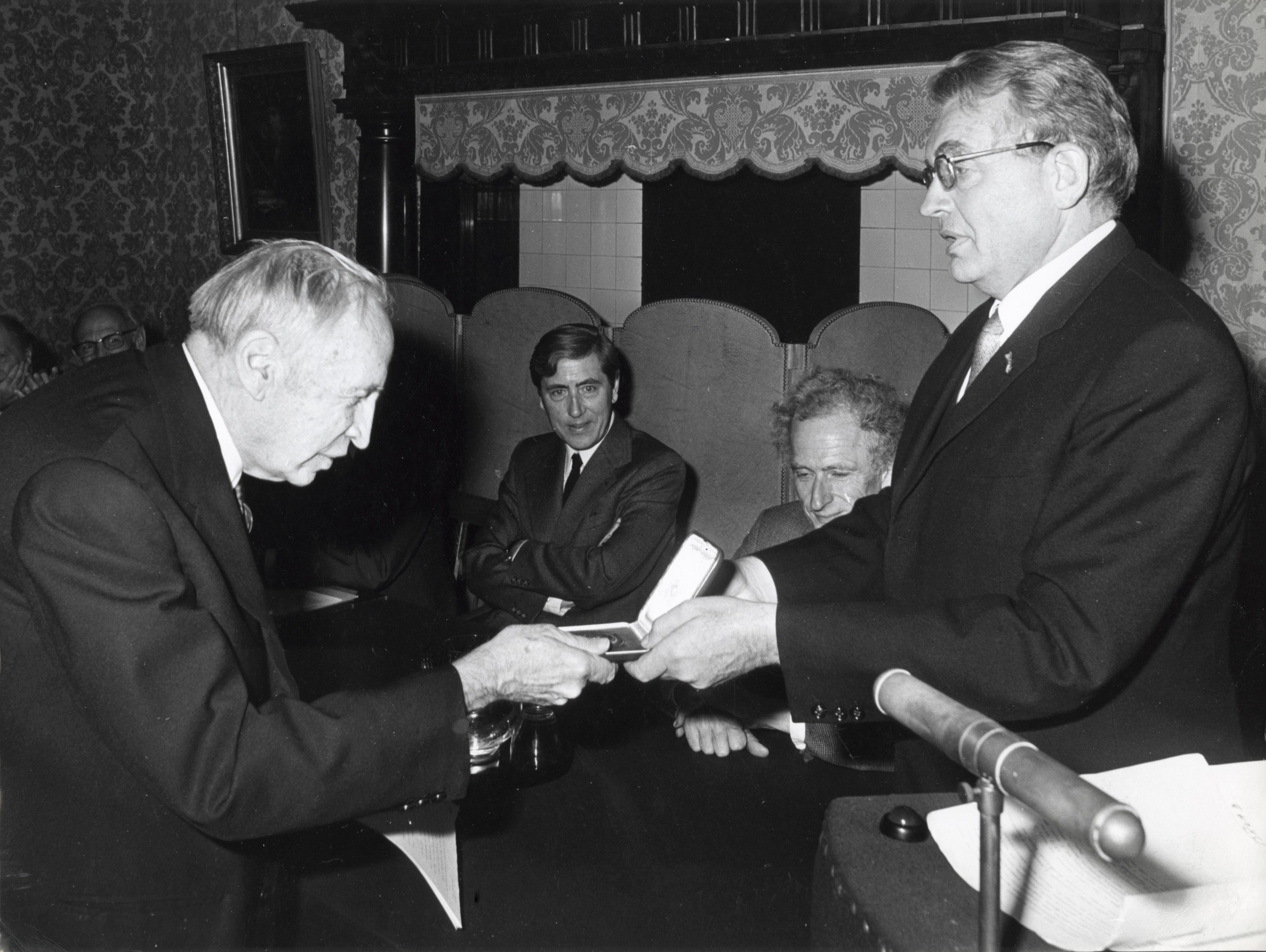
Van Vleck (left) receives the Lorentz Medal from Hendrik Brugt Gerhard Casimir at the Royal Netherlands Academy of Arts and Sciences, Amsterdam, 1974.

J. H. Van Vleck participated in the Manhattan Project. In June 1942, J. Robert Oppenheimer held a summer study for confirming the concept and feasibility of a nuclear weapon at the University of California, Berkeley. Eight theoretical scientists, including J. H. Van Vleck, attended it. From July to September, the theoretical study group examined and developed the principles of atomic bomb design.

J. H. Van Vleck's theoretical work led to the establishment of the Los Alamos Nuclear Weapons Laboratory. He also served on the Los Alamos Review committee in 1943. The committee, established by General Leslie Groves, also consisted of W. K. Lewis of MIT, Chairman; E. L. Rose, of Jones & Lamson; E. B. Wilson of Harvard; and Richard C. Tolman, Vice Chairman of NDRC. The committee's important contribution (originating with Rose) was a reduction in the size of the firing gun for the Little Boy atomic bomb, a concept that eliminated additional design weight and sped up production of the bomb for its eventual release over Hiroshima. However, it was not employed for the Fat Man bomb at Nagasaki, which relied on implosion of a plutonium shell to reach critical mass.

The philosopher and historian of science Thomas Kuhn completed a Ph.D. in physics under Van Vleck's supervision at Harvard.

From 1951, Van Vleck was Hollis Professor of Mathematics and Natural Philosophy at Harvard. He concurrently held the first deanship of Harvard's Division of Engineering and Applied Physics until 1957.

In 1961–62 he was George Eastman Visiting Professor at University of Oxford and held a professorship at Balliol College.

In 1950 he became foreign member of the Royal Netherlands Academy of Arts and Sciences. He was awarded the National Medal of Science in 1966 and the Lorentz Medal in 1974. For his contributions to the understanding of the behavior of electrons in magnetic solids, Van Vleck was awarded the Nobel Prize in Physics 1977, along with Philip W. Anderson and Sir Nevill Mott. Van Vleck transformations, Van Vleck paramagnetism and Van Vleck formula are named after him.

== Personal life and death ==
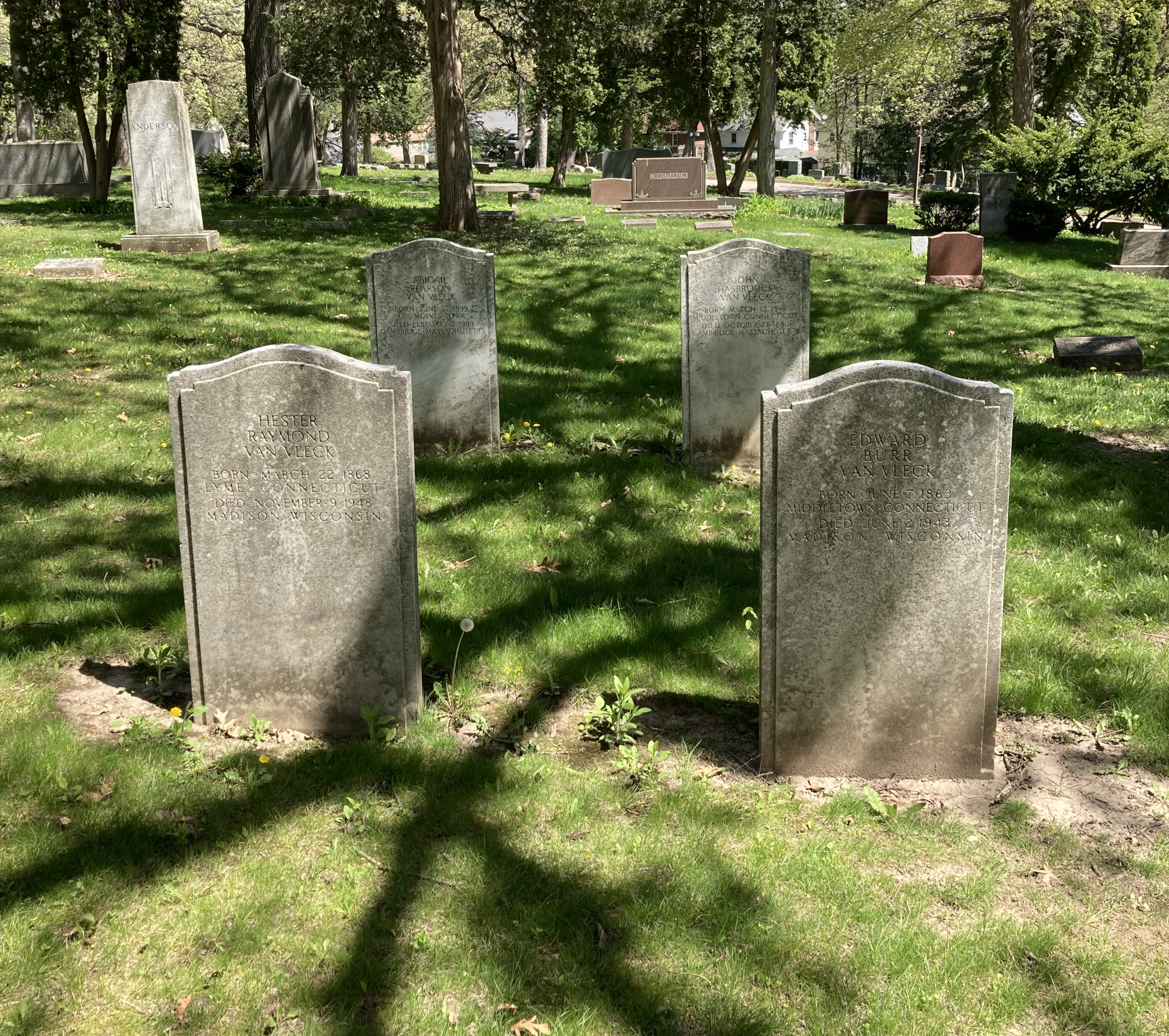
Van Vleck's grave (back right) at Forest Hill Cemetery

While a professor at the University of Minnesota, John Hasbrouck Van Vleck met Abigail Pearson, a student at the university, and later married her on June 10, 1927. They inherited from Van Vleck's father a collection of Japanese woodblock prints, known as the E. B. Van Vleck Collection, which they donated to the Chazen Museum of Art in Madison, Wisconsin in 1980s. He was related to Tom Van Vleck, a software engineer who co-authored an early email program.

Van Vleck died on October 27, 1980, in Cambridge, Massachusetts. He is buried at Forest Hill Cemetery.

== Awards and honors ==
Van Vleck was elected to the American Academy of Arts and Sciences in 1934, the United States National Academy of Sciences in 1935, and the American Philosophical Society in 1939. He was awarded the Irving Langmuir Award in 1965, the National Medal of Science in 1966 and elected a Foreign Member of the Royal Society (ForMemRS) in 1967. He was awarded the Elliott Cresson Medal in 1971, the Lorentz Medal in 1974 and the Nobel Prize in Physics in 1977.

== Publications ==
- The Absorption of Radiation by Multiply Periodic Orbits, and its Relation to the Correspondence Principle and the Rayleigh–Jeans Law. Part I. Some Extensions of the Correspondence Principle, Physical Review, vol. 24, Issue 4, pp. 330–346 (1924)
- The Absorption of Radiation by Multiply Periodic Orbits, and its Relation to the Correspondence Principle and the Rayleigh–Jeans Law. Part II. Calculation of Absorption by Multiply Periodic Orbits, Physical Review, vol. 24, Issue 4, pp. 347–365 (1924)
- The Statistical Interpretation of Various Formulations of Quantum Mechanics, Journal of the Franklin Institute, vol. 207, Issue 4, pp. 475–494 (1929)
- Quantum Principles and Line Spectra, (Bulletin of the National Research Council; v. 10, pt 4, no. 54, 1926)
- The Theory of Electric and Magnetic Susceptibilities (Oxford at Clarendon, 1932).
- Quantum Mechanics, The Key to Understanding Magnetism, Nobel Lecture, December 8, 1977
- The Correspondence Principle in the Statistical Interpretation of Quantum Mechanics Proceedings of the National Academy of Sciences of USA, vol. 14, pp. 178–188 (1928)

Academic offices
Preceded by Percy Williams Bridgman	Hollis Chair of Mathematics and Natural Philosophy; 1951–1969	Succeeded by Andrew Gleason
