= Igor Gamow =

American microbiology professor and inventor (1935–2021)

Rustem Igor Gamow (November 4, 1935 – April 15, 2021) was a microbiology professor for the University of Colorado and inventor. His best known inventions included the Gamow bag and the Shallow Underwater Breathing Apparatus.

== Early life and education ==
Gamow was born in the Georgetown section of Washington, D.C., the son of physicists George Gamow and Lyubov Vokhmintseva "Rho" Gamow, both immigrants from the USSR. He finished high school at age 17, and then joined the National Ballet Company. He worked breaking horses, delivering packages by motorcycle, and teaching karate before enrolling at the University of Colorado in 1958, where his father taught. Igor Gamow received a B.A. and M.S. in biology, and a Ph.D. in biophysics, all at University of Colorado.

== Career ==
Gamow worked on Phycomyces blakesleeanus during postdoctoral research for Max Delbrück at Caltech. At CU-Boulder, he did Phycomyces research for more than twenty years, mainly concerning the avoidance and anemotropic responses, helical growth, and cell-wall mechanical properties. He also studied the infrared-detectors of the Boa constrictor.

An avid outdoorsman, Gamow developed a number of inventions for safety for outdoor activities. His first important one, patented in 1990, was the Gamow bag enabling mountain climbers to avoid altitude sickness by increasing the surrounding pressure. Sir Edmund Hillary, the first person to summit Mount Everest, wrote him in congratulation. Another was the Shallow Underwater Breathing Apparatus ("SUBA"), a pressurized snorkel system permitting swimmers to breathe easily as deep as ten feet under water.

Gamow also worked in bionics, on an orthopedic knee brace that stores energy within a spring from the hamstring and redirects it to the quadriceps.

=== Patents ===
- U.S. patent 4,974,829 — Hyperbaric chamber
- U.S. patent 5,109,837 — Hyperbaric chamber
- U.S. patent 5,193,530 — Underwater breathing apparatus
- U.S. patent 5,360,001 — Hyperbaric chamber closure means
- U.S. patent 5,367,790 — Shoe and foot prosthesis with a coupled spring system
- U.S. patent 5,398,678 — Hyperbaric chamber and exercise environment
- U.S. patent 5,467,764 — Hypobaric sleeping chamber
- U.S. patent 5,580,094 — In-line skate walking guard
- U.S. patent 5,701,686 — Shoe and foot prosthesis with bending beam spring structures
- U.S. patent 5,947,116 — Underwater breathing apparatus with pressurized snorkel
- U.S. patent 6,029,374 — Shoe and foot prosthesis with bending beam spring structures

=== University of Colorado termination ===
In 2002, a former assistant of Gamow, filed a lawsuit against the University of Colorado in which it alleged sexual harassment and sexual assault of seven women. After the lawsuit was filed, the university began proceedings to terminate Gamow. In 2004, the CU Board of Regents unanimously approved the recommendation to dismiss Gamow for "moral turpitude", and he was dismissed. Gamow filed a lawsuit against CU in an attempt to be reinstated.

In May 2006, the university lost a lawsuit that had been filed by Gamow's former assistant and was ordered to pay her $285,000 plus attorney's fees.

In September 2011, Gamow released an open letter addressing some misconceptions about events resulting in his termination from the University of Colorado.
