= One Two Three... Infinity =

1947 book by George Gamow

- First edition
- Author: George Gamow
- Illustrator: George Gamow
- Language: English
- Subjects: Science, mathematics
- Published: 1947 (Viking Press)
- Publication place: United States
- Media type: Print
- Pages: 340
- ISBN: 978-0486256641
- LC Class: Q162.G23

One Two Three... Infinity: Facts and Speculations of Science is a popular science book by theoretical physicist George Gamow. The book explores a wide range of fundamental concepts in mathematics and science, written at a level understandable by middle school students up through "intelligent layman" adults. It was first published in 1947, with several new additions over the next decades, and as of 2026 it could still be readily accessed through various electronic formats. The book includes many handmade illustrations by Gamow.

== Synopsis ==
The 340-page book has four parts (marked I, II, III, and IV) and eleven chapters. In the preface, the shortness of the last part is attributed to the prior coverage in Gamow's previous books The Birth and Death of the Sun and Biography of the Earth. There are 128 illustrations that Gamow drew, "topologically transformed" from works by "numerous artists and illustrators", thanked by Gamow in the preface. A four-page index is included.

In 1961 a new edition was published. In its preface, Gamow says that by luck the 1947 edition was "written just after a number of important scientific advances", so that "relatively few changes and additions were necessary". For example, Heinz Fraenkel-Conrat and Robley Williams separated tobacco mosaic virus into lifeless molecules and then recombined them into active virus. A 1965 edition speculated on assembly of a "man-made virus particle" (p. 267).

=== Part I: Playing with Numbers ===
Part I is mainly concerned with expressing large numbers, Georg Cantor and infinity, and the imaginary unit. After disparaging the Roman numeral system for being limited to thousands (M), The Sand Reckoner system of myriads and octades is described. In terms of one-to-one correspondences, in the world of infinity "a part may be equal to the whole". Aleph number zero is described, with aleph one related to points in a plane, and aleph two to curves. (These latter associations are not true unless the generalized continuum hypothesis holds, which Gamow fails to mention.) As for prime numbers, the sieve of Eratosthenes is shown. The Fermat numbers are given and related to primes. Goldbach's conjecture is stated: "Every even number can be written as the sum to two primes." It was an epithet of Gerolamo Cardano that stuck: square roots of negative numbers are imaginary. The Argand diagram is displayed, and multiplication by i rotates the diagram counter-clockwise by a right angle. The study of complex numbers then deviates into treasure hunting.

=== Part II: Space, Time & Einstein ===
Part II opens with "unusual properties of space" and touches on "transformation of coordinates" and polar coordinates before taking up topology. Euler's polyhedral formula for polyhedrons projected onto a sphere is illustrated and proven. Modification of the formula for the doughnut (torus) and other holed surfaces is mentioned. The four-color problem (solved 1976) is explained, and the fact that seven colors are necessary and sufficient on the doughnut. Sphere eversion is described in terms of two separate wormholes filling an apple. Reminding the reader of gastrulation in embryonic development, and interpreting a person as a doughnut, one of the illustrations depicts a person turned inside-out. The chirality property of three-dimensional space is missing on the Möbius strip and Klein bottle.

Turning to the temporal extension of space, there are worldlines and in the world-bars of beings "most of the fibers stay together as a group". Rømer's determination of the speed of light is recounted, leading to the lightyear and the light-foot (1.1×10^{−9} seconds) as space-time equivalents. Then space-time intervals are measured with the Pythagorean theorem modified with a negative term for the square of the temporal separation. A bus going down Fifth Avenue in New York City represents a moving point of reference, and requires a "rotation of the four-dimensional axis-cross", with the separation "invariant with respect to rotation". Considering the luminiferous ether, the failure of the Michelson–Morley experiment in 1887 is described as a blow to classical physics and absolute space and time. Speculating on future high-velocity travel, a trip after breakfast to Sirius to land on a planet for lunch and the return to Earth for dinner is described. Curvature of starlight beams was confirmed with photographs taken at Príncipe by a 1919 solar eclipse expedition. Given that the average curvature of the universe may be positive, negative or zero, the mass distribution may provide a resolution.

=== Part III: Microcosmos ===
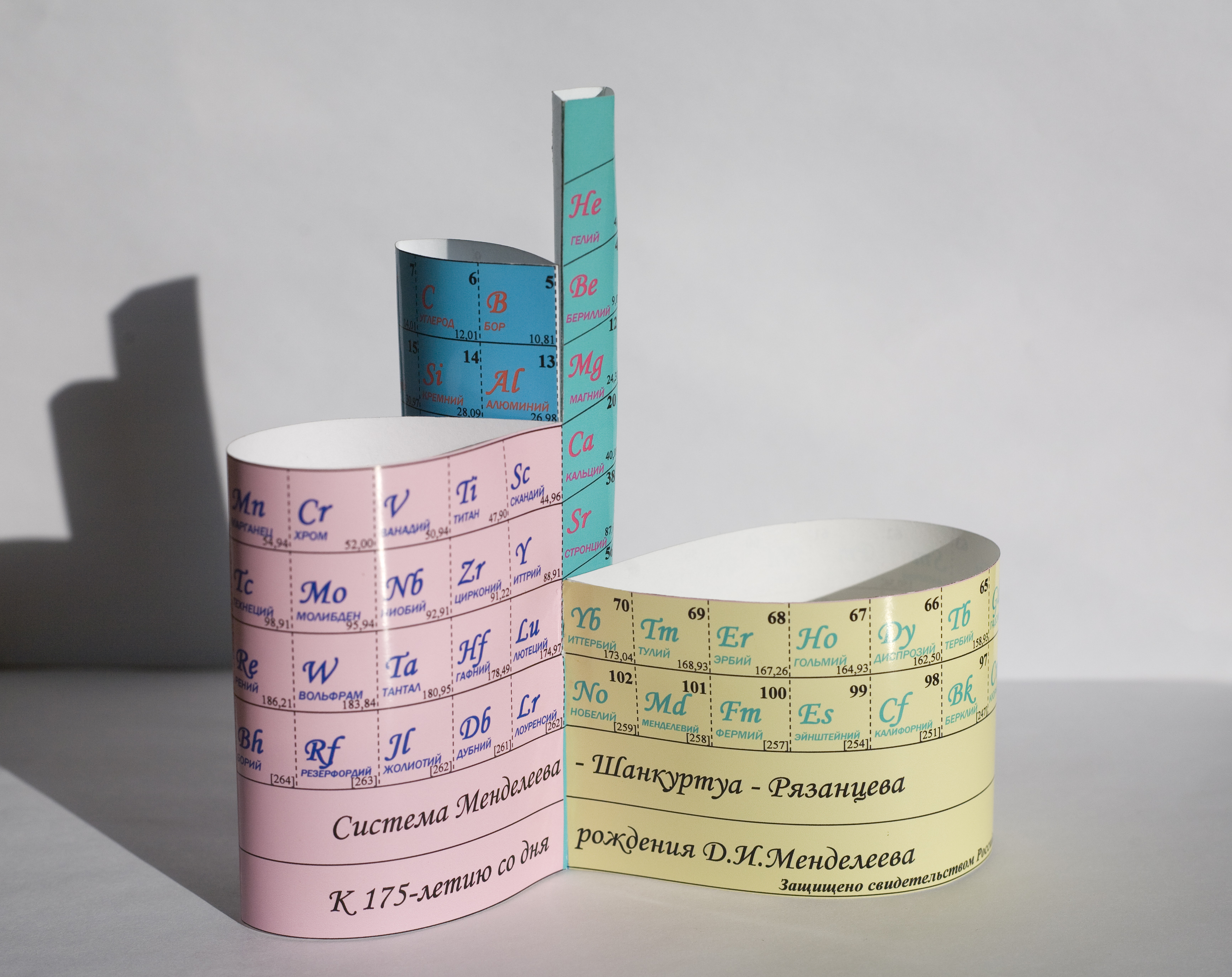
Mendeleev flower-style periodic table

Part III is the longest (150 pages) and begins with the "descending staircase" and the classical elements. "Plants take the largest part of the material used in the growth of their bodies ... from the air." Rust is oxidation of iron. The question "How large are the atoms?" calls for an experiment to obtain an oil film just one molecule thick. "1 cu mm of oil can cover 1 sq m of water." The law of definite proportions is stated in plain English (p. 123) as a "fundamental law of chemistry". The molecular structure of matter was uncovered with molecular beams by Otto Stern, and Lawrence Bragg invented "atomic photography" with X-rays.

The section "Dissecting the atom" begins by considering oxygen to be doughnut-shaped, fitting the atoms of hydrogen forming water. Dismissing the notion, Gamow asserts that atoms are "complex mechanisms with a large number of moving parts". Through ionization, and reference to J. J. Thomson, the electron is introduced, having mass 1/1840 of the mass of a hydrogen atom. The Rutherford model of the atom, an analogy to the Solar System, is supported with reference to the percentage of mass at the center: 99.87% for the Sun and 99.97% for the nucleus. Gamow's version of the periodic table of the elements uses flower petals with stems at the inert gasses. The "utmost precision" of celestial mechanics is contrasted with the quantum of action, which leads to the uncertainty principle. Diffraction phenomena not explicable with geometric optics necessitated the wave mechanics of Louis de Broglie and Erwin Schrödinger.

In the chapter "The Riddle of Life" the states of matter in an automobile body, engine, and radiator are also present in living systems, but homogeneity of biological tissue is of a different sort. A human is estimated to have more than hundreds of thousands of billions of cells. To eat, grow, and multiply are posited as life characteristics. Dismissed are crystal accretion in a super-saturated solution, and the molecular reaction

$$\ce{3 H2O + 2 CO + C2H5OH -> 2 C2H5OH + 3 O2 .}$$

On the other hand, virus reproduction is the "missing link" between non-living and living organisms. The eight chromosomes of Drosophila melanogaster are acknowledged for their contribution to science. Growth by mitosis and reproduction by meiosis with gametes performing syngamy show the function of chromosomes. Growth and accretion are started with blastula and gastrula.

=== Part IV: Macrocosmos ===
Aristotle's On the Heavens founded cosmology. Earth's circumference was found by Eratosthenes, presuming Aswan is on the boundary of the Northern Tropic. Extra-terrestrial distances use stellar parallax, which Gamow relates to human binocular vision working to push the end of a thread through the eye of a needle. A solar-pumpkin scale is introduced where the Sun is pumpkin-sized, Earth is pea-sized, and Moon poppy-seed sized. This scale proportions an astronomical unit to 200 feet (61 m). Friedrich Bessel measured the parallax of 61 Cygni, concluding a distance of 10 light years, making him "the first man who with a yardstick stepped into interstellar space". In the solar-pumpkin scale, 61 Cygni is 30,000 miles (48,000 km) away.

Our own galaxy, the Milky Way, measures 100,000 light years in diameter with 5 to 10 light years thickness, totaling 4×10^{10} stars. Cepheid variables are pulsating stars that have a period–luminosity relation, exploited by Harlow Shapley to estimate distances to globular clusters. The interstellar dust in the direction of the Galactic Center obscures the view except through Baade's Window.

=== Sources ===
Instead of a bibliography as an appendix, Gamow cites a dozen titles in the course of his exposition:

- p. 9: Mathematical Recreations and Essays (1919) by W. W. Rouse Ball
- p. 49: What Is Mathematics? (1941) by Richard Courant and Herbert Robbins
- p. 146: Mr. Thompkins in Wonderland by himself
- p. 156: Atomic Physics (1935) by Max Born
- p. 156: Modern Physics (1940) by T. B. Brown
- p. 187: Explaining the Atom (1947) by Selig Hecht
- p. 216: "The Gold-Bug" by Edgar Allan Poe
- p. 272: On the Heavens by Aristotle
- p. 303: Exposition du Systeme du Monde by Laplace
- p. 304: Birth and Death of the Sun (1940) by himself
- p. 304: Biography of the Earth by himself
- p. 315: A Planet Called Earth by himself

== Reception ==
Science writer Willy Ley praised Gamow's book, describing it as an "admittedly rare ... book which entertains by way of instruction". Kirkus Reviews declared it "a stimulating and provocative book for the science-minded layman". Theoretical physicist Sean M. Carroll credited One Two Three... Infinity with setting the trajectory of his professional life. Cognitive scientist Steven Pinker read the book as a child, and has cited it as contributing to his interest in popular science writing. Astrophysicist and science popularizer Neil deGrasse Tyson identified One Two Three... Infinity as one of two books which had the greatest impact on him, the other being Mathematics and the Imagination by Edward Kasner and James R. Newman.

In 1956, Gamow was awarded the Kalinga Prize by UNESCO for his work in popularizing science, including his book One, Two, Three... Infinity, as well as other works.
