= Martynas Yčas =

Lithuanian-American microbiologist (1917–2014)

- Born: December 10, 1917
- Died: April 22, 2014 (aged 96)
- Spouse: Mary Katherine Warren

Martynas Yčas (December 10, 1917 – April 22, 2014) was an American microbiologist of Lithuanian descent. He co-authored the book Mr. Tompkins: Inside Himself with physicist George Gamow.

Yčas was born in Voronezh. He started studying law in Lithuania in 1936. In 1941, Yčas went to the University of Wisconsin–Madison, where as a U.S. Army recruit he assisted at the Russian language school. After the war he studied zoology there, gaining the Bachelor of Arts in 1948. He then studied microbiology at California Institute of Technology, graduating in 1950. Upstate Medical University in Syracuse, New York hired him in 1956 and he taught microbiology there until 1988.

He was a founding member of the RNA Tie Club, a discussion society of scientists who attempted to decipher the genetic code and with Gamow and others published early statistical analyses of proteins and DNA which disproved some early models of the genetic code. The review for The Biological Code said the book was "the most complete and best-indexed treatment of the biological code available."

Yčas grew up in a bilingual home speaking Lithuanian and English. In school he acquired French, German, Spanish and Latin. He later developed an interest in ancient Greek, hieroglyphics, Sumerian, Assyrian, and Sanskrit.

He moved to Boulder, Colorado in 2009.

== Works ==
- 1955: Gamow, George; Yčas, Martynas (1955). "Statistical correlation of protein and ribonucleic acid composition". Proc Natl Acad Sci U S A. 41 (12): 1011–1019. Bibcode:1955PNAS...41.1011G. doi:10.1073/pnas.41.12.1011. PMC 528190. PMID 16589789.
- 1960: "Correlation of viral ribonucleic acid and protein composition", Nature 188: 209 to 212
- 1967: Mr. Tompkins Inside Himself. Yčas revised Gamow's 1953 book Mr Tompkins Learns the Facts of Life, giving it the insight of molecular biology.
- 1969: The Biological Code
