= Marcia J. Rieke =

American astronomer

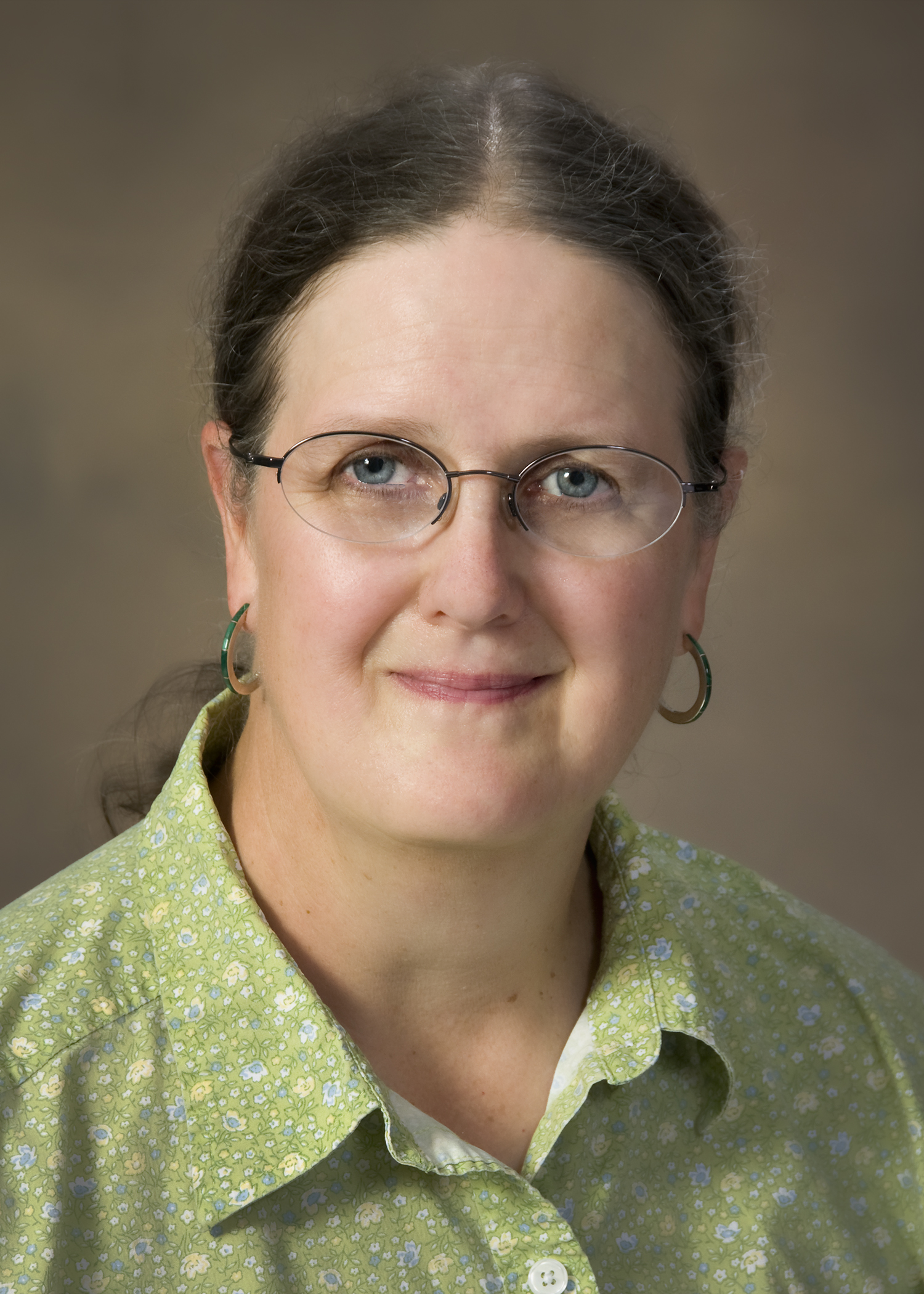
- Born: Marcia Jean Keyes; June 13, 1951 (age 75); Hillsdale, Michigan, U.S.
- Education: Massachusetts Institute of Technology
- Awards: Gruber Cosmology Prize (2024)
- Scientific career
- Fields: Astronomy and Astrophysics
- Workplaces: University of Arizona; Steward Observatory
- Thesis: The Distribution of Celestial Infrared Sources. (1976)
- Doctoral advisor: Susan G. Kleinmann

Marcia Jean Rieke (/ˈriːki/ REE-kee) is an American astronomer. She is a Regents' Professor of Astronomy and associate department head at the University of Arizona. Rieke is the Principal Investigator on the near-infrared camera (NIRCam) for the James Webb Space Telescope (JWST). Marcia Rieke is considered by many to be one of the "founding mothers" of infrared astronomy, along with Judith Pipher. In 2025, she was elected to the American Philosophical Society.

== Early life and education ==
Marcia Rieke was born Marcia Keyes on June 13, 1951, in Hillsdale, Michigan. Rieke and her family soon after moved to Midland, Michigan where she attended elementary, middle and high school. The presence of the Dow Chemical Company headquarters in Midland made science a topic of importance for kids throughout the school system. She graduated from Midland High School (Midland, Michigan) in 1969.

Rieke studied at the Massachusetts Institute of Technology where she earned her bachelor's degree in 1972 and her Ph.D. in 1976, both in physics.

== Career and research ==
After receiving her degrees from MIT, Rieke became a postdoctoral fellow at the University of Arizona in 1976, and has remained there ever since, now as Regents' Professor of Astronomy and formerly as Associate Department Head for the Steward Observatory. Her scientific research interests include infrared observations of galactic nuclei and galaxies in the early universe (high-redshift galaxies). Her early career at the University of Arizona was focused on the development of infrared cameras at the Steward Observatory. She was a co-investigator for the multiband imaging photometer on the Spitzer Space Telescope, which flew from 2003-2020. She was then the deputy-Principal Investigator on the Near Infrared Camera and Multi-Object Spectrometer (NICMOS) for the Hubble Space Telescope (HST). Rieke served as the Principal Investigator for the Webb's NIRCam from 2002-2022. Rieke was also involved with several infrared ground-based observatories, including the MMT Observatory in Arizona. She was vice chair for Program Prioritization of the Astro2010 Decadal Survey Committee, "New Worlds, New Horizons". Her work with space-based infrared telescopes has investigated composition and formation of early galaxies.

In 2007, Rieke was elected a fellow of the American Academy of Arts and Sciences.

In 2012, Rieke was elected to the National Academy of Sciences.

She was elected a Legacy Fellow of the American Astronomical Society in 2020.

In 2023, she received a NASA Distinguished Public Service Medal for her contribution to the field of astronomy and her key roles in the development of cutting-edge instruments for the James Webb Space Telescope.

== Honors and awards ==
- 1980 – George Van Biesbroeck Prize
- 1992-1996 - National Science Foundation Faculty Award for Women
- 1995 – Mortar Board Senior Honor Society
- 2004 – Lyman Spitzer Lecturer, Princeton University
- 2006 – University of Arizona Galileo Circle Fellow
- 2014 – NASA Exceptional Public Service Medal
- 2014 – Robert H. Goddard Award for Achievement in Science
- 2023 – NASA Distinguished Public Service Medal
- 2023 – Bruce Medal
- 2024 – Gruber Cosmology Prize
- 2025 – Henry Norris Russell Lectureship

== Personal life ==
Marcia Rieke is married to the infrared astronomer George H. Rieke.
