= George Gamow =

American theoretical physicist (1904–1968)

- Born: Georgiy Antonovich Gamov; March 4, 1904; Odessa, Russian Empire
- Died: August 19, 1968 (aged 64); Boulder, Colorado, U.S.
- Citizenship: Soviet Union; United States
- Education: Leningrad State University
- Known for: Gamow factor; Gamow–Teller transition; Alpher–Bethe–Gamow paper; Alpha decay; Big Bang; cGh physics; Liquid drop model; Quantum tunnelling; Urca process; One Two Three ... Infinity
- Spouse(s): Lyubov Vokhmintseva (m. 1931; div. 1956) Barbara (m. 1958)
- Children: Igor
- Awards: Kalinga Prize (1956)
- Scientific career
- Fields: Physicist, science writer
- Workplaces: University of Göttingen; Niels Bohr Institute; Cavendish Laboratory; George Washington University; University of California, Berkeley; University of Colorado Boulder
- Doctoral advisor: Alexander Friedmann
- Doctoral students: Ralph Asher Alpher; Vera Rubin

George Gamow (sometimes Gammoff; born Georgiy Antonovich Gamov; Russian: Гео́ргий Анто́нович Га́мов; 4 March [O.S. 20 February] 1904 – August 19, 1968) was a Soviet and American polymath, theoretical physicist and cosmologist. He was an early advocate and developer of Georges Lemaître's Big Bang theory. Gamow discovered a theoretical explanation of alpha decay by quantum tunneling, invented the liquid drop model (the first mathematical model of the atomic nucleus), worked on radioactive decay, star formation, stellar nucleosynthesis, Big Bang nucleosynthesis (which he collectively called nucleocosmogenesis), and predicted the existence of the cosmic microwave background radiation and molecular genetics.

In his middle and late career, Gamow directed much of his attention to teaching and wrote popular science, including One Two Three... Infinity and the Mr Tompkins series. Some of his books remain in print more than a half-century after their original publication. The George Gamow Memorial Lectures at the University of Colorado at Boulder are given in his honor.

== Early biography and career ==
Gamow was born in Odessa in the Russian Empire (present-day Odesa, Ukraine). His father taught Russian language and literature in secondary schools, and his mother taught geography and history at a school for girls. In addition to Russian, Gamow learned to speak some French from his mother and German from a tutor. Gamow learned English in his college years and became fluent. Most of his early publications were in German or Russian, but he later used English both for technical papers and for the lay audience.

He was educated at the Institute of Physics and Mathematics in Odessa (1922–23) and at the University of Leningrad (1923–1929). Gamow studied under Alexander Friedmann in Leningrad, until Friedmann's early death in 1925, which required him to change dissertation advisors. At the university, Gamow made friends with three other students of theoretical physics, Lev Landau, Dmitri Ivanenko and Matvey Bronshtein. The four formed a group they called the Three Musketeers, which met to discuss and analyze the ground-breaking papers on quantum mechanics published during those years. He later used the same phrase to describe the Alpher, Herman and Gamow group.

Upon graduation, he worked on quantum theory in Göttingen, where his research into the atomic nucleus provided the basis for his doctorate. He then worked at the Theoretical Physics Institute of the University of Copenhagen from 1928 to 1931, with a break to work with Ernest Rutherford at the Cavendish Laboratory in Cambridge. He continued to study the atomic nucleus (proposing the "liquid drop" model), but also worked on stellar physics with Robert Atkinson and Fritz Houtermans.

In 1931, Gamow was elected a corresponding member of the Academy of Sciences of the USSR at age 28 – one of the youngest in its history. (Note: He was expelled from the Academy in 1938, but his membership was restored posthumously in 1990.) (Note: The youngest corresponding member elected to the Academy of Sciences of the USSR was the Armenian mathematician Sergey Mergelyan (1928-2008), elected at age 24.) During the period 1931–1933, Gamow worked in the Physical Department of the Radium Institute in Leningrad headed by Vitaly Khlopin. Europe's first cyclotron was designed under the guidance and direct participation of Igor Kurchatov, Lev Mysovskii and Gamow. In 1932, Gamow and Mysovskii submitted a draft design for consideration by the Academic Council of the Radium Institute, which approved it. The cyclotron was not completed until 1937.

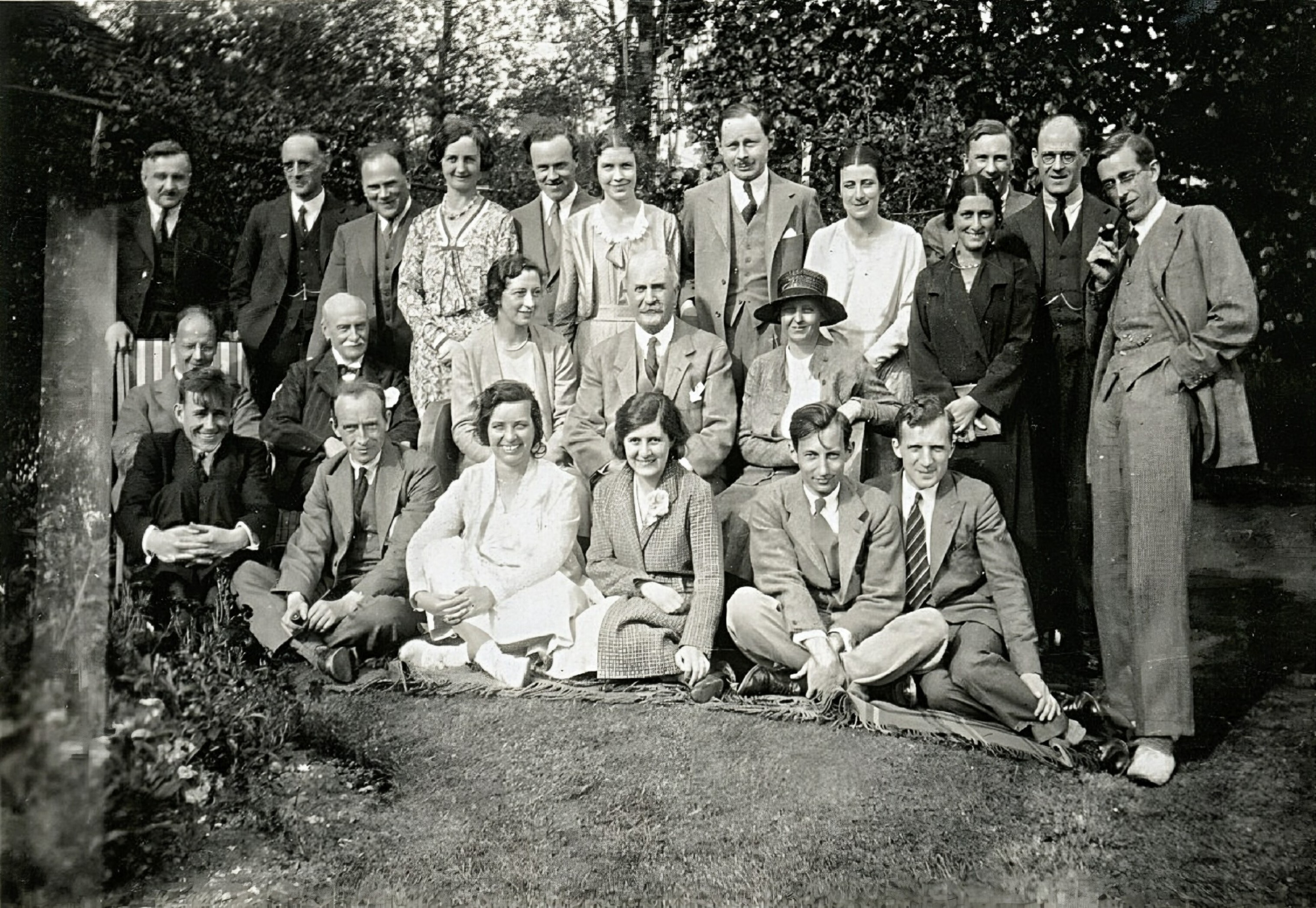
Staff of William Bragg's laboratory in 1931: W. H. Bragg (sitting, center): physicist A. Lebedev (leftmost), G. Gamow (rightmost)

== Radioactive decay ==
In the early 20th century, radioactive materials were known to have characteristic exponential decay rates, or half-lives. At the same time, radiation emissions were known to have certain characteristic energies. By 1928, Gamow in Göttingen had solved the theory of the alpha decay of a nucleus via tunnelling, with mathematical help from Nikolai Kochin. The problem was also solved independently by Ronald W. Gurney and Edward U. Condon. Gurney and Condon did not, however, achieve the quantitative results achieved by Gamow.

Classically, the particle is confined to the nucleus because of the high energy requirement to escape the very strong nuclear potential well. Also classically, it takes an enormous amount of energy to pull apart the nucleus, an event that would not occur spontaneously. In quantum mechanics, however, there is a probability the particle can "tunnel through" the wall of the potential well and escape. Gamow solved a model potential for the nucleus and derived from first principles a relationship between the half-life of the alpha-decay event process and the energy of the emission, which had been previously discovered empirically and was known as the Geiger–Nuttall law. Some years later, the name Gamow factor or Gamow–Sommerfeld factor was applied to the probability of incoming nuclear particles tunnelling through the electrostatic Coulomb barrier and undergoing nuclear reactions.

== Defection ==
Gamow worked at a number of Soviet establishments before deciding to flee the Soviet Union because of increased oppression. In 1931, he was officially denied permission to attend a scientific conference in Italy. Also in 1931, he married Lyubov Vokhmintseva (Russian: Любовь Вохминцева), another physicist in the Soviet Union, whom he nicknamed "Rho" after the Greek letter. Gamow and his new wife spent much of the next two years trying to leave the Soviet Union, with or without official permission. Niels Bohr and other friends invited Gamow to visit during this period, but Gamow could not get permission to leave.

Gamow later said that his first two attempts to defect with his wife were in 1932 and involved trying to kayak: first a planned 250-kilometer paddle over the Black Sea to Turkey, and another attempt from Murmansk to Norway. Poor weather foiled both attempts, but they had not been noticed by the authorities.

In 1933, Gamow was suddenly granted permission to attend the 7th Solvay Conference on physics, in Brussels. He insisted on having his wife accompany him, even saying that he would not go alone. Eventually the Soviet authorities relented and issued passports for the couple. The two attended and arranged to extend their stay, with the help of Marie Curie and other physicists. Over the next year, Gamow obtained temporary work at the Curie Institute, University of London, and the University of Michigan.

== Move to America ==
In 1934, Gamow and his wife moved to the United States. He became a professor at George Washington University (GWU) in 1934 and recruited physicist Edward Teller from London to join him at GWU. In 1936, Gamow and Teller published what became known as the "Gamow–Teller selection rule" for beta decay. During his time in Washington, Gamow would also publish major scientific papers with Mário Schenberg and Ralph Alpher. By the late 1930s, Gamow's interests had turned towards astrophysics and cosmology.

When recruited in GWU, Gamow started the Washington Conference on Theoretical Physics, a series of small conferences from 1935–1947, that brought up experts in theoretical physics to discuss different subjects. During the 1939 conference, Bohr announced publicly the discovery of nuclear fission.

In 1935, Gamow's son, Igor Gamow was born (in a 1947 book, Gamow's dedication was "To my son IGOR, Who Would Rather Be a Cowboy"). George Gamow became a naturalized American in 1940. He retained his formal association with GWU until 1956.

During World War II, Gamow continued to teach physics at George Washington University and consulted for the US Navy.

Gamow was interested in the processes of stellar evolution and the early history of the Solar System. In 1945, he co-authored a paper supporting work by German theoretical physicist Carl Friedrich von Weizsäcker on planetary formation in the early Solar System. Gamow published another paper in the British journal Nature in 1948, in which he developed equations for the mass and radius of a primordial galaxy (which typically contains about one hundred billion stars, each with a mass comparable with that of the Sun).

== Big Bang nucleosynthesis ==
George Gamow smoking a cigarette.

Gamow's work led the development of the hot "big bang" theory of the expanding universe. He was the earliest to employ Alexander Friedmann's and Georges Lemaître's non-static solutions of Einstein's gravitational equations describing a universe of uniform matter density and constant spatial curvature. Gamow's crucial advance would provide a physical reification of Lemaître's idea of a unique primordial quantum. Gamow did this by assuming that the early universe was dominated by radiation rather than by matter. Most of the later work in cosmology is founded in Gamow's theory. He applied his model to the question of the creation of the chemical elements and to the subsequent condensation of matter into galaxies, whose mass and diameter he was able to calculate in terms of the fundamental physical parameters, such as the speed of light c, the Newtonian constant of gravitation G, the fine-structure constant α, and the Planck constant h.

Gamow's interest in cosmology arose from his earlier interest in energy generation and element production and transformation in stars. This work, in turn, evolved from his fundamental discovery of quantum tunneling as the mechanism of nuclear alpha decay, and his application of this theory to the inverse process to calculate rates of thermonuclear reaction.

At first, Gamow believed that all the elements might be produced in the very high temperature and density early stage of the universe. Later, he revised this opinion on the strength of compelling evidence advanced by Fred Hoyle and others, that elements heavier than lithium are largely produced in thermonuclear reactions in stars and in supernovae. Gamow formulated a set of coupled differential equations describing his proposed process and assigned, as a PhD dissertation topic, his graduate student Ralph Alpher the task of solving the equations numerically. These results of Gamow and Alpher appeared in 1948 as the Alpher–Bethe–Gamow paper. (Hans Bethe was not a coauthor, but Gamow invoked him in absentia to evoke the first three letters of the Greek alphabet.) Before his interest turned to the question of the genetic code, Gamow published about twenty papers on cosmology. The earliest was in 1939 with Edward Teller on galaxy formation, followed in 1946 by the first description of cosmic nucleosynthesis. He also wrote many popular articles as well as academic textbooks on this and other subjects.

In 1948, he published a paper dealing with an attenuated version of the coupled set of equations describing the production of the proton and the deuteron from thermal neutrons. By means of a simplification and using the observed ratio of hydrogen to heavier elements, he was able to obtain the density of matter at the onset of nucleosynthesis and from this the mass and diameter of the early galaxies. In 1953 he produced similar results, but this time based on another determination of the density of matter and radiation, at the time at which they became equal. In this paper, Gamow determined the density of the relict background radiation, from which a present temperature of 7 K was predicted – a value which was slightly more than twice the presently-accepted value.

In 1967, he published reminiscences and recapitulation of his own work as well as the work of Alpher and Robert Herman (both with Gamow and also independently of him). This was prompted by the discovery of the cosmic microwave background radiation by Penzias and Wilson in 1965; Gamow, Alpher, and Herman felt that they did not receive the credit they deserved for their theoretical predictions of its existence and source. Gamow was disconcerted by the fact that the authors of a communication explaining the significance of the Penzias/Wilson observations failed to recognize and cite the previous work of Gamow and his collaborators.

== DNA and RNA ==
In 1953, Francis Crick, James Watson, Maurice Wilkins and Rosalind Franklin discovered the double helix structure of the DNA macromolecule. Gamow attempted to solve the problem of how the ordering of four different bases (adenine, cytosine, thymine and guanine) in DNA chains might control the synthesis of proteins from their constituent amino acids. Crick has said that Gamow's suggestions helped him in his own thinking about the problem. As related by Crick, Gamow observed that the 4^{3} = 64 possible permutations of the four DNA bases, taken three at a time, would be reduced to 20 distinct combinations if the order was irrelevant. Gamow proposed that these 20 combinations might code for the twenty amino acids which, he suggested, might well be the sole constituents of all proteins. Gamow's contribution to solving the problem of genetic coding gave rise to important models of biological degeneracy.

The specific system that Gamow was proposing (called "Gamow's diamonds") proved to be incorrect. The triplets were supposed to be overlapping, so that in the sequence GGAC (for example), GGA could produce one amino acid and GAC another, and also non-degenerate (meaning that each amino acid would correspond to one combination of three bases – in any order). Later protein sequencing work proved that this could not be the case; the true genetic code is non-overlapping and degenerate, and changing the order of a combination of bases does change the amino acid.

In 1954, Gamow and Watson co-founded the RNA Tie Club. This was a discussion group of leading scientists concerned with the problem of the genetic code, which counted among its members the physicists Edward Teller and Richard Feynman. In his autobiographical writings, Watson later acknowledged the great importance of Gamow's insightful initiative. However, this did not prevent him from describing this colorful personality as a "zany", card-trick playing, limerick-singing, booze-swilling, practical–joking "giant imp".

== Late career and life ==
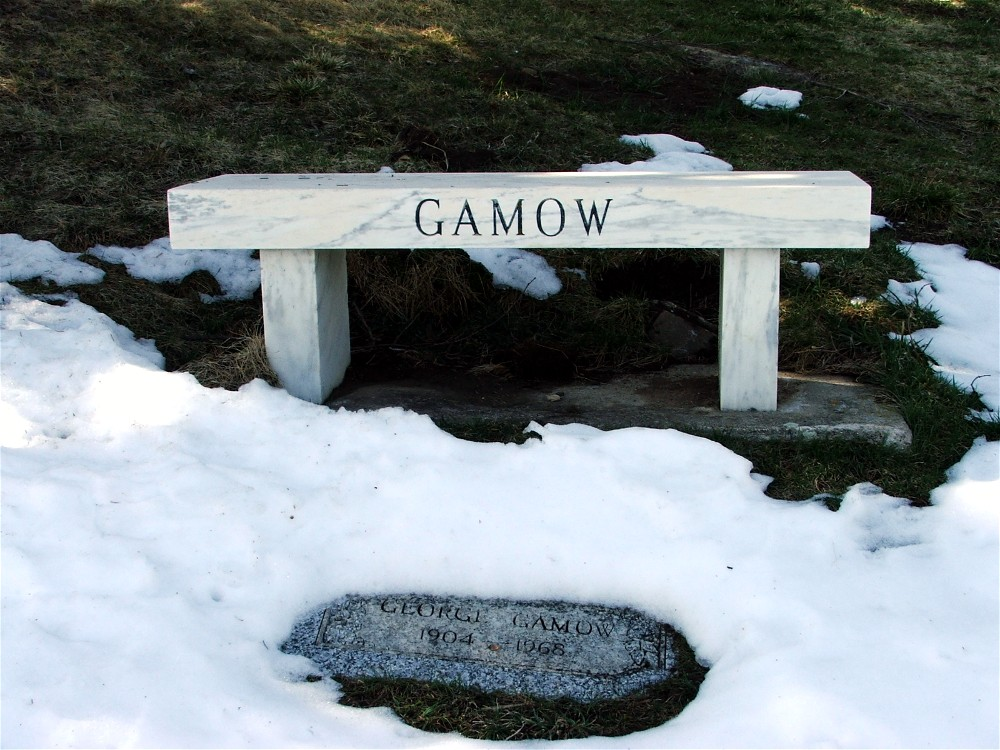
Gamow's grave in Green Mountain Cemetery, Boulder, Colorado, US

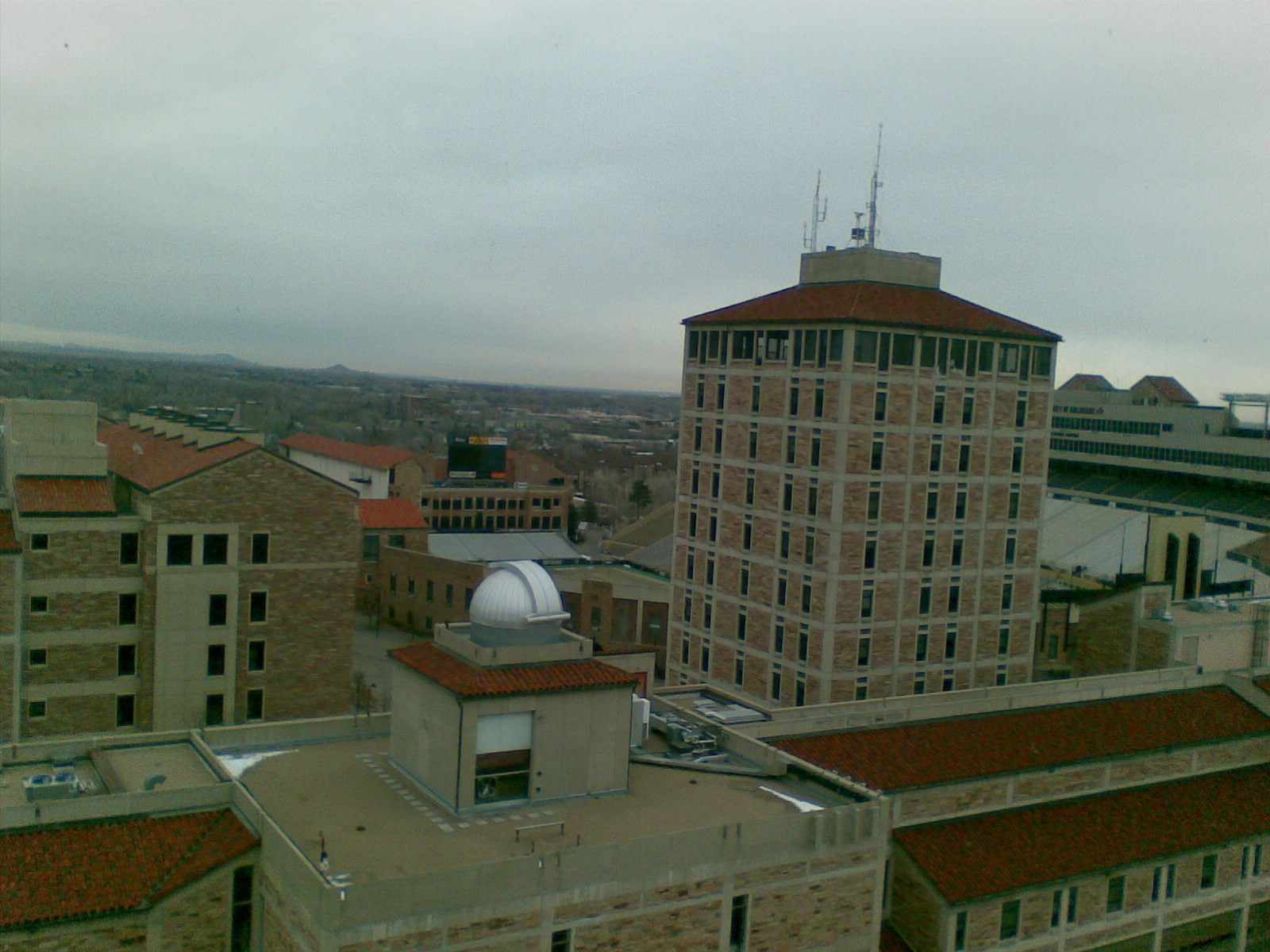
The George Gamow Tower at the University of Colorado Boulder

Gamow worked at George Washington University from 1934 until 1954, when he became a visiting professor at the University of California, Berkeley. In 1956, he moved to the University of Colorado Boulder, where he remained for the rest of his career. In 1956, Gamow became one of the founding members of the Physical Science Study Committee (PSSC), which later reformed teaching of high-school physics in the post-Sputnik years.

In 1959, Gamow, Hans Bethe, and Victor Weisskopf publicly supported the re-entry of Frank Oppenheimer into teaching college physics at the University of Colorado, as the Red Scare began to fade (J. Robert Oppenheimer was the older brother of Frank Oppenheimer, and both of them had worked on the Manhattan Project before their careers in physics were derailed by McCarthyism). While in Colorado, Frank Oppenheimer became increasingly interested in teaching science through simple hands-on experiments, and he eventually moved to San Francisco to found the Exploratorium. Gamow would not live to see his colleague's opening of this innovative new science museum, in late August 1969.

In his 1961 book The Atom and its Nucleus, Gamow proposed representing the periodic system of the chemical elements as a continuous tape, with the elements in order of atomic number wound round in a three-dimensional helix whose diameter increased stepwise (corresponding to the longer rows of the conventional periodic table).

Gamow continued his teaching at the University of Colorado Boulder and focused increasingly on writing textbooks and books on science for the general public. After several months of ill health, surgeries on his circulatory system, diabetes, and liver problems, Gamow was dying from liver failure, which he had called the "weak link" that could not withstand the other stresses.

In a letter written to Ralph Alpher on August 18, he had written, "The pain in the abdomen is unbearable and does not stop". Prior to this, there had been a long exchange of letters with his former student, in which he was seeking a fresh understanding of some concepts used in his earlier work, with Paul Dirac. Gamow relied on Alpher for deeper understanding of mathematics.

On August 19, 1968, Gamow died at age 64 in Boulder, Colorado, and was buried there in Green Mountain Cemetery. The physics department tower at the University of Colorado at Boulder is named after him, as is Gamow crater on the far side of the Moon.

== Personal life ==
Gamow had a son, Igor Gamow, with his first wife Rho in 1935. Igor later became a professor of microbiology at the University of Colorado, as well as an inventor.

In 1956, Gamow divorced his wife Rho. In 1958 he married Barbara Perkins, an editor for one of his publishers.

Gamow was a well-known prankster, who delighted in practical jokes and humorous twists embedded in serious scientific publications. His most famous prank was the pioneering Alpher–Bethe–Gamow paper (1948), which was serious in its style and content. However, Gamow could not resist adding his colleague Hans Bethe to the list of authors, as a pun on the first three letters of the Greek alphabet.

Gamow was an atheist.

== Writings ==
Gamow was a highly successful science writer, with several of his books still in print more than a half-century after their initial publication. As an educator, Gamow recognized and emphasized fundamental principles that were unlikely to become obsolete, even as the pace of science and technology accelerated. He also conveyed a sense of excitement with the revolution in physics and other scientific topics of interest to the common reader. Gamow himself sketched the many illustrations for his books, which added a new dimension to and complemented what he intended to convey in the text. He was unafraid to introduce mathematics wherever it was essential, but he tried to avoid deterring potential readers by including large numbers of equations that did not illustrate essential points.

In 1946 Gamow was a proponent of human spaceflight propelled by atomic energy. "We may prepare ourselves for a trip to the moon and to various planets of our solar system in a comfortable rocketship driven by atomic power." He also wrote "the ordinary chemical fuels which could be used in the motor of such a rocketship could not possibly give it the necessary velocity...". By 1965 he moderated his expectations though he re-stated his atomic-power prognostication:

Whereas we may be able to study the forms of life that may have developed on Mars and Venus (the best "inhabitable" planets of the solar system) in the not too distant future by means of an adventuresome trip to these planets on a "nuclear power propelled space ship," the question about the possible existence and the forms of life in other stellar worlds hundreds and thousands of light-years away, will probably remain forever an unsolvable problem of science.

By that time the space race was underway with conventional chemical rockets.

His book, The Creation of the Universe, was first published in 1952, concluding: "It took less than an hour to make all the atoms in the universe, a few hundred million years to make the stars and planets but three billion years to make man."

In 1956, he was awarded the Kalinga Prize by UNESCO for his work in popularizing science with his Mr. Tompkins... series of books (1939–1967), his book One, Two, Three...Infinity, and other works.

Before his death, Gamow was working with Richard Blade on a textbook Basic Theories in Modern Physics, but the work was never completed or published under that title. Gamow was also writing My World Line: An Informal Autobiography, which was published posthumously in 1970.

A collection of Gamow's writings was donated to The George Washington University in 1996. The materials include correspondence, articles, manuscripts and printed materials both by and about George Gamow. The collection is currently under the care of GWU's Special Collections Research Center, located in the Estelle and Melvin Gelman Library.

== Books ==
=== Popular ===
- The Birth and Death of the Sun (1940, revised 1952)
- The Biography of the Earth (1941)
- Atomic Energy in Cosmic and Human Life (1946)
- One Two Three ... Infinity (1947, revised 1961), Viking Press (copyright renewed by Barbara Gamow, 1974), Dover Publications, ISBN 0-486-25664-2, illustrated by the author. Dedicated to his son, Igor Gamow, it remains one of the most well received ever in the popular science genre. The book winds from mathematics to biology, to physics, crystallography, and more.
- The Moon, H. Schuman (1953), revised edition Abelard-Schuman, London New-York, 1959, 127 pages. Revised edition taking account recent explorations of the lunar surface, by George Gamow and Harry C. Stubbs, The Moon, Abelard-Schuman, 1971, 128 p.ISBN 978-0200717618.
- Gamow, George; Stern, Marvin (1958). Puzzle-Math. Viking Press. ISBN 978-0-333-08637-7.
- Biography of Physics Harper & Brothers (1961) ASIN B000UULZIG
- Gravity (1962) Dover Publications, ISBN 0-486-42563-0. Profiles of Galileo, Newton, and Einstein
- A Planet Called Earth (1963)
- A Star Called the Sun (1964)
- Thirty Years That Shook Physics: The Story of Quantum Theory, 1966, Dover Publications, ISBN 0-486-24895-X.
- My World Line: An Informal Autobiography (1970) Viking Press, ISBN 0-670-50376-2

==== Mr Tompkins series ====
Throughout these books, Mr Tompkins is introduced as "C. G. H. Tompkins" to emphasize the notion of cGh physics.

- Mr Tompkins in Wonderland (1940) originally published 1938 in serial form in Discovery magazine (UK)
- Mr Tompkins Explores the Atom (1945)
  - Mr Tompkins in Paperback (1965), combines Mr Tompkins in Wonderland with Mr Tompkins Explores the Atom, Cambridge University Press; 1993 Canto edition, foreword by Roger Penrose
  - The New World of Mr Tompkins (1999), coauthor Russell Stannard updated Mr Tompkins in Paperback (ISBN 9780521630092 hardcover)
- Mr Tompkins Learns the Facts of Life (1953), about biology
  - Mr. Tompkins Inside Himself (1967), coauthor Martynas Yčas revised Mr Tompkins Learns the Facts of Life giving a broader view of biology, including recent developments in molecular biology

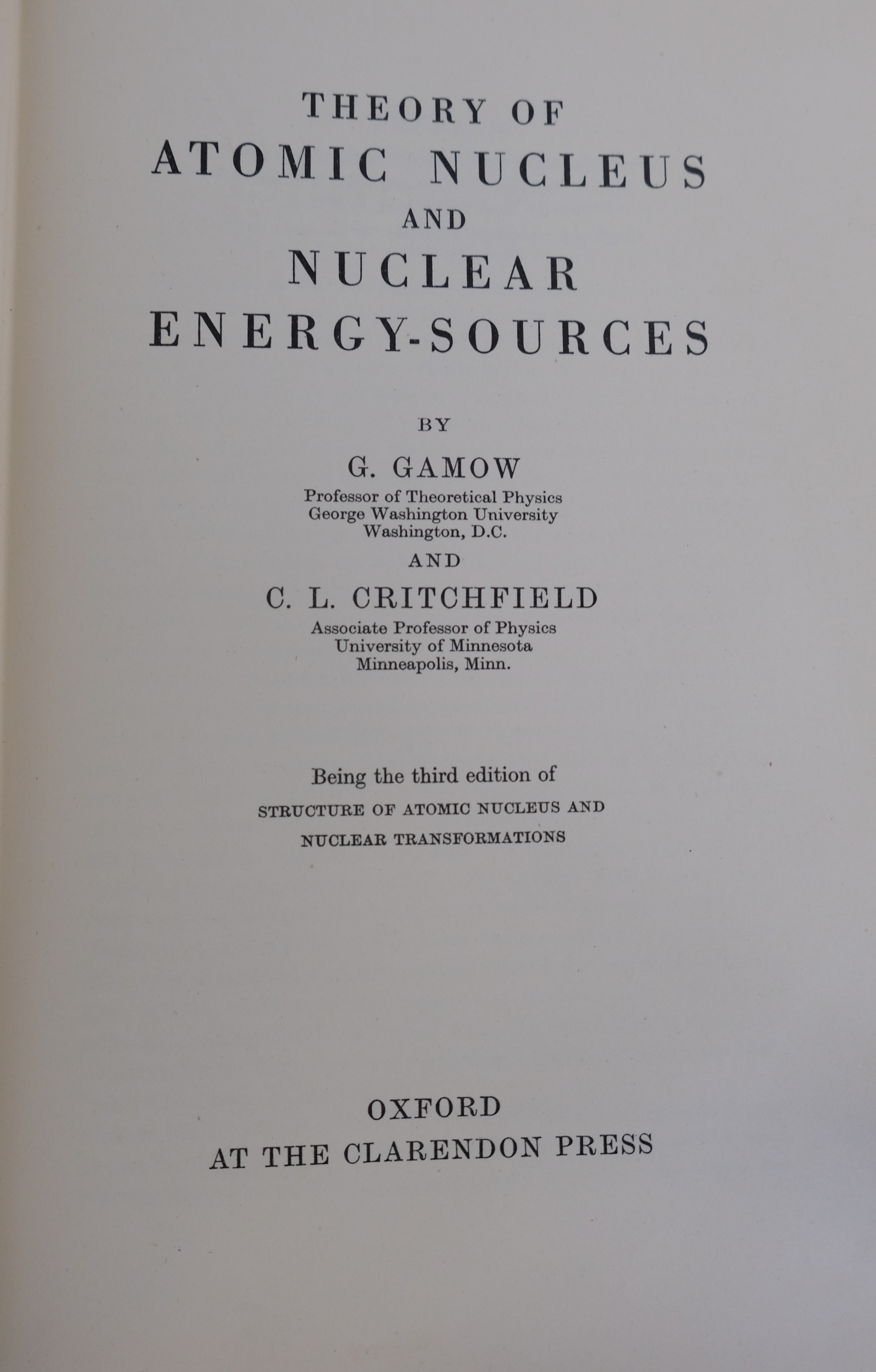
Title page of a 1949 copy of "Theory of Atomic Nucleus and Nuclear Energy-Sources"

=== Science textbooks ===
- The Constitution of Atomic Nuclei and Radioactivity (1931)
- Structure of Atomic Nuclei and Nuclear Transformations (1937)
- Atomic Energy in Cosmic and Human Life (1947)
- Theory of Atomic Nucleus and Nuclear Energy Sources (1949) coauthor C. L. Critchfield
- The Creation of the Universe (1952)
- Matter, Earth and Sky (1958)
- Physics: Foundations & Frontiers (1960) coauthor John M. Cleveland
- The Atom and its Nucleus (1961)
- Mr. Tompkins Gets Serious: The Essential George Gamow (2005). edited by Robert Oerter, Pi Press, ISBN 0-13-187291-5. Incorporates material from Matter, Earth, and Sky and The Atom and Its Nucleus. Notwithstanding the title, this book is not part of the Mr. Tompkins series.

== See also ==
- George Gamow Memorial Lectures
- Urca process
- Ylem
