= Discovery of cosmic microwave background radiation =

Aspect of the history of modern physical cosmology

The discovery of cosmic microwave background radiation constitutes a major development in modern physical cosmology. In 1964, American physicist Arno Allan Penzias and radio-astronomer Robert Woodrow Wilson discovered the cosmic microwave background (CMB), estimating its temperature as 3.5 K, as they experimented with the Holmdel Horn Antenna. The new measurements were accepted as important evidence for a hot early Universe (Big Bang theory) and as evidence against the rival steady state theory as theoretical work around 1950 showed the need for a CMB for consistency with the simplest relativistic universe models. In 1978, Penzias and Wilson were awarded the Nobel Prize for Physics for their joint measurement. There had been a prior measurement of the cosmic background radiation (CMB) by Andrew McKellar in 1941 at an effective temperature of 2.3 K using CN stellar absorption lines observed by W. S. Adams. Although no reference to the CMB is made by McKellar, it was not until much later after the Penzias and Wilson measurements, that the significance of this earlier measurement was understood.

== History ==
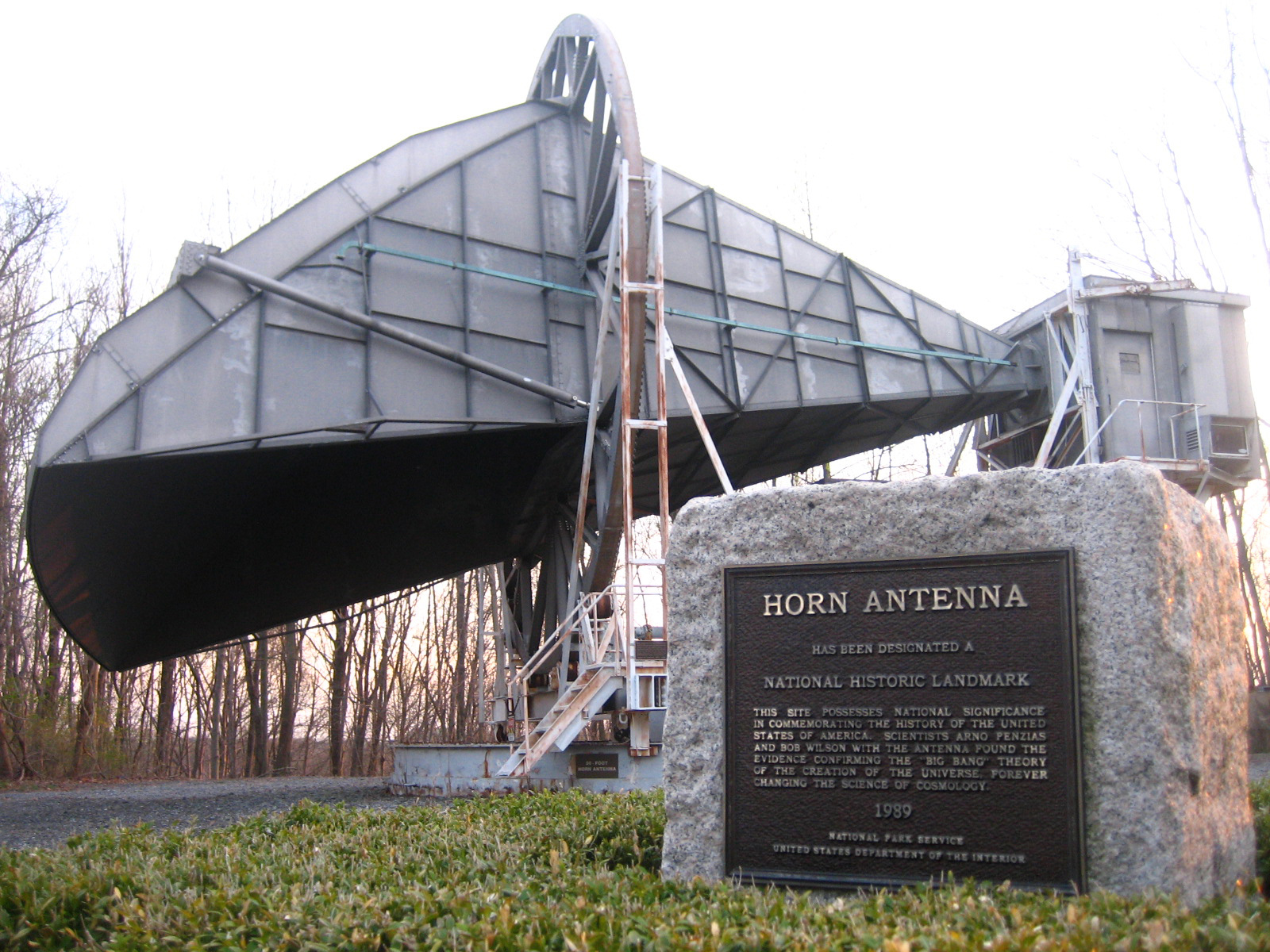
Bell Labs' Horn Antenna on Crawford Hill in Holmdel NJ – In 1964 while using the Horn Antenna, Penzias and Wilson stumbled on the microwave background radiation that permeates the universe.

By the middle of the 20th century, cosmologists had developed two different theories to explain the creation of the universe. Some supported the steady-state theory, which states that the universe has always existed and will continue to survive without noticeable change. Others believed in the Big Bang theory, which states that the universe was created in a massive explosion-like event billions of years ago (later determined to be approximately 13.8 billion years).

In 1941, Andrew McKellar used W. S. Adams' spectroscopic observations of CN absorption lines in the spectrum of a B type star to measure a blackbody background temperature of 2.3 K. McKellar referred to his detection as a "'rotational' temperature of interstellar molecules", without reference to a cosmological interpretation, stating that the temperature "will have its own, perhaps limited, significance".

Over two decades later, working at a Bell Telephone Laboratories facility atop Crawford Hill in Holmdel, New Jersey, in 1964, Arno Penzias and Robert Wilson were experimenting with a supersensitive, 6 meter (20 ft) horn antenna originally built to detect radio waves bounced off Echo balloon satellites. To measure these faint radio waves, they had to eliminate all recognizable interference from their receiver. They removed the effects of radar and radio broadcasting, and suppressed interference from the heat in the receiver itself by cooling it with liquid helium to −269 °C (−452.20 °F), only 4 K above absolute zero.

When Penzias and Wilson reduced their data, they found a low, steady, mysterious noise that persisted in their receiver. This residual noise was 100 times more intense than they had expected, was evenly spread over the sky, and was present day and night. They were certain that the radiation they detected on a wavelength of 7.35 centimetres (4,080 MHz) did not come from the Earth, the Sun, or our galaxy. After thoroughly checking their equipment, removing some pigeons nesting in the antenna and cleaning out the accumulated droppings, the noise remained. Both concluded that this noise was coming from outside our own galaxy—although they were not aware of any radio source that would account for it.

At that same time, Robert H. Dicke, Jim Peebles, and David Wilkinson, astrophysicists at Princeton University just 60 km (37 mi) away, were preparing to search for microwave radiation in this region of the spectrum. Dicke and his colleagues reasoned that the Big Bang must have scattered not only the matter that condensed into galaxies, but also must have released a tremendous blast of radiation. With the proper instrumentation, this radiation should be detectable, albeit as microwaves, due to a massive redshift.

When his friend Bernard F. Burke, a professor of physics at MIT, told Penzias about a preprint paper he had seen by Jim Peebles on the possibility of finding radiation left over from an explosion that filled the universe at the beginning of its existence, Penzias and Wilson began to realize the significance of what they believed was a new discovery. The characteristics of the radiation detected by Penzias and Wilson fit exactly the radiation predicted by Robert H. Dicke and his colleagues at Princeton University. Penzias called Dicke at Princeton, who immediately sent him a copy of the still-unpublished Peebles paper. Penzias read the paper and called Dicke again and invited him to Bell Labs to look at the horn antenna and listen to the background noise. Dicke, Peebles, Wilkinson and P. G. Roll interpreted this radiation as a signature of the Big Bang.

To avoid potential conflict, they decided to publish their results jointly. Two notes were rushed to the Astrophysical Journal Letters. In the first, Dicke and his associates outlined the importance of cosmic background radiation as substantiation of the Big Bang Theory. In a second note, jointly signed by Penzias and Wilson titled, "A Measurement of Excess Antenna Temperature at 4080 Megacycles per Second," they reported the existence of a 3.5 K residual background noise, remaining after accounting for a sky absorption component of 2.3 K and a 0.9 K instrumental component, and attributed a "possible explanation" as that given by Dicke in his companion letter.

In 1978, Penzias and Wilson were awarded the Nobel Prize for Physics for their joint detection. They shared the prize with Pyotr Kapitsa, who won it for unrelated work. In 2019, Jim Peebles was also awarded the Nobel Prize for Physics, “for theoretical discoveries in physical cosmology”.

== Bibliography ==
- Aaronson, Steve (January 1979). "The Light of Creation: An Interview with Arno A. Penzias and Robert W. Wilson". Bell Laboratories Record: 12–18.
- Abell, George O. (1982). Exploration of the Universe. 4th ed. Philadelphia: Saunders College Publishing. ISBN 9780030585029.
- Asimov, Isaac (1982). Asimov's Biographical Encyclopedia of Science and Technology. 2nd ed. New York: Doubleday & Company, Inc.
- Bernstein, Jeremy (1984). Three Degrees Above Zero: Bell Labs in the Information Age. New York: Charles Scribner's Sons. ISBN 978-0-684-18170-7.
- Brush, Stephen G. (August 1992). "How Cosmology Became a Science". Scientific American. 267 (2): 62–70. Bibcode:1992SciAm.267b..62B. doi:10.1038/scientificamerican0892-62.
- Chown, Marcus (September 29, 1988). "A cosmic relic in three degrees". New Scientist. 119: 51–55. Bibcode:1988NewSc.119...51C.
- Crawford, A.B.; Hogg, D. C.; Hunt, L. E. (July 1961). "Project Echo: A Horn-Reflector Antenna for Space Communication". The Bell System Technical Journal. 40: 1095–1099. doi:10.1002/j.1538-7305.1961.tb01639.x.
- Disney, Michael (1984). The Hidden Universe. New York: Macmillan Publishing Company. ISBN 978-0-02-531670-6.
- Ferris, Timothy (1978). The Red Limit: The Search for the Edge of the Universe. 2nd ed. New York: Quill Press.
- Friedman, Herbert (1975). The Amazing Universe. Washington, DC: National Geographic Society. ISBN 978-0-87044-179-0.
- Hey, J.S. (1973). The Evolution of Radio Astronomy. New York: Neale Watson Academic Publications, Inc. ISBN 978-0-88202-027-3.
- Jastrow, Robert (1978). God and the Astronomers. New York: W. W. Norton & Company, Inc. ISBN 978-0-393-01187-6.
- Kirby-Smith, H.T. (1976). U.S. Observatories: A Directory and Travel Guide. New York: Van Nostrand Reinhold Company. ISBN 978-0-442-24451-4.
- Learner, Richard (1981). Astronomy Through the Telescope. New York: Van Nostrand Reinhold Company. ISBN 978-0-442-25839-9.
