= Cosmic background radiation =

Electromagnetic radiation from the Big Bang

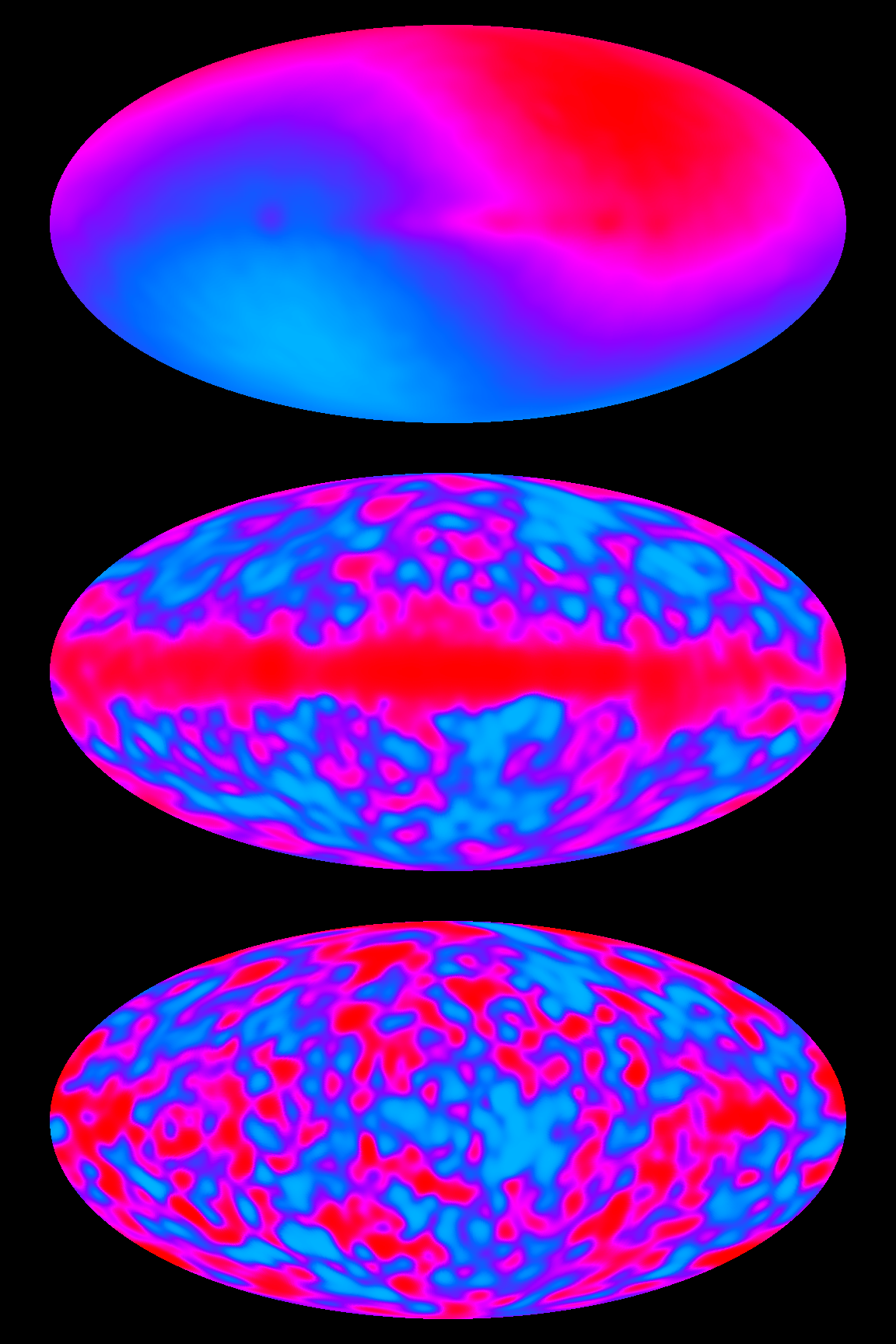
Temperature of the cosmic background radiation spectrum based on COBE data: uncorrected (top); corrected for the dipole term due to our peculiar velocity (middle); corrected additionally for contributions from our galaxy (bottom).

Cosmic background radiation is electromagnetic radiation that fills all space. The origin of this radiation depends on the region of the spectrum that is observed. One component is the cosmic microwave background. This component is redshifted photons that have freely streamed from an epoch when the Universe became transparent for the first time to radiation. Its discovery and detailed observations of its properties are considered one of the major confirmations of the Big Bang. Background radiation is largely homogeneous and isotropic. A slight detectable anisotropy is present which correlates to galaxy filaments and voids. In 1965, while investigating an unexplained excess noise in an exceptionally sensitive microwave antenna, Arno Penzias and Robert Wilson systematically eliminated instrumental and terrestrial sources and discovered the cosmic microwave background radiation, which shows that the early universe was dominated by a radiation field of extremely high temperature and pressure.

There is background radiation observed across all wavelength regimes, peaking in microwave range (cosmic microwave background), but also notable in infrared range (cosmic infrared background) and X-ray range (X-ray background). Fluctuations in cosmic background radiation across regimes create parameters for the amount of baryonic matter in the universe. See also cosmic neutrino background and extragalactic background light.

The Sunyaev–Zel'dovich effect shows the phenomena of radiant cosmic background radiation interacting with "electron" clouds distorting the spectrum of the radiation.

== Timeline of significant events ==
1896: Charles Édouard Guillaume estimates the "radiation of the stars" to be 5.6 K.

1926: Sir Arthur Eddington estimates the non-thermal radiation of starlight in the galaxy has an effective temperature of 3.2 K.

1930s: Erich Regener calculates that the non-thermal spectrum of cosmic rays in the galaxy has an effective temperature of 2.8 K.

1931: The term microwave first appears in print: "When trials with wavelengths as low as 18 cm were made known, there was undisguised surprise that the problem of the micro-wave had been solved so soon." Telegraph & Telephone Journal XVII. 179/1"

1938: Walther Nernst re-estimates the cosmic ray temperature as 0.75 K.

1946: The term "microwave" is first used in print in an astronomical context in an article "Microwave Radiation from the Sun and Moon" by Robert Dicke and Robert Beringer.

1946: Robert Dicke predicts a microwave background radiation temperature of 20 K.

1946: Robert Dicke predicts a microwave background radiation temperature of "less than 20 K" but later revised to 45 K.

1946: George Gamow estimates a temperature of 50 K.

1948: Ralph Alpher and Robert Herman re-estimate Gamow's estimate at 5 K.

1949: Ralph Alpher and Robert Herman re-re-estimate Gamow's estimate at 28 K.

1960s: Robert Dicke re-estimates a MBR (microwave background radiation) temperature of 40 K.

1965: Arno Penzias and Robert Woodrow Wilson measure the temperature to be approximately 3 K. Robert Dicke, P. J. E. Peebles, P. G. Roll and D. T. Wilkinson interpret this radiation as a signature of the Big Bang.

1992: Measurements by NASA's Cosmic Background Explorer (COBE) satellite reveal intrinsic anisotropies in the cosmic microwave background at approximately one part in 100,000, providing evidence for the primordial density fluctuations from which large-scale structure developed.

== See also ==
- Hot dark matter
- Irradiation
- Unruh effect
