= Bell Telephone Laboratories (disambiguation) =

Bell Telephone Laboratories may refer to:

- Bell Labs - the institution as a whole
- Bell Laboratories at 600 Mountain Avenue, Murray Hill, New Jersey, the largest facility. Site where Bardeen, Brattain, Shockley et al. invented the transistor.
- Bell Laboratories at Crawford Hill, 791 Holmdel-Keyport Rd, Holmdel, New Jersey, where Penzias and Wilson discovered the cosmic microwave background radiation.
- Bell Labs Holmdel Complex at 101 Crawfords Corner Road, Holmdel, New Jersey, now vacant. Site where Karl Jansky invented radio astronomy.
- Original Bell Laboratories Building (Manhattan), 463 West Street in Greenwich Village, New York, New York. On the National Register of Historic Places.

Similar:

- Alexander Graham Bell Laboratory and the Bell Laboratory were alternated names of the Volta Laboratory created by Alexander Graham Bell in Washington, D.C., in 1880.
