= Andrei Doroshkevich =

Russian astronomer (1937–2026)

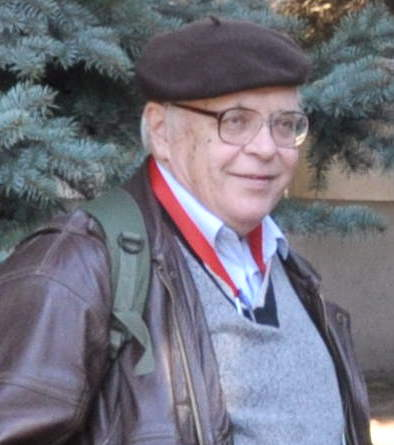
Andrei Doroshkevich in Minsk, 2014

Andrei Georgievich Doroshkevich (Russian: Андрей Георгиевич Дорошкевич, 22 January 1937 – 26 October 2026) was a Soviet and Russian theoretical astrophysicist and cosmologist, head of the laboratory on the physics of the early universe at the Lebedev Physical Institute.

== Life and career ==
Andrei Georgievich Doroshkevich was born on 22 January 1937. He was best known for his work with Igor Novikov, which they published in 1964, providing a theoretical basis for the cosmic microwave background radiation and pointing out that this radiation should be experimentally measurable. The signal of this radiation had been discovered experimentally by T. A. Shmaonov in 1957, but his work had been forgotten even in the Soviet Union by the time of Doroshkevich and Novikov's work. Their own work, also, remained unknown in the west until after the Nobel Prize winning rediscovery of the same signal by Arno Penzias and Robert Wilson in 1965.

Doroshkevich died on 26 October 2026, at the age of 89.

== Selected publications ==
- Doroshkevich, A. G.; Novikov, I. D. (1964). "Mean density of radiation in the metagalaxy and certain problems in relativistic cosmology". Soviet Physics Doklady. 9: 111. Bibcode:1964SPhD....9..111D.
- Doroshkevich, A. G. (1973). "Spatial structure of perturbations and origin of galactic rotation in fluctuation theory". Astrophysics. 6 (4): 320–330. Bibcode:1970Afz.....6..581D. doi:10.1007/bf01001625. S2CID 120581375.
- Doroshkevich, A. G.; Zel'dovich, Y. B.; Syunyaev, R. A. (1978). "Fluctuations of the microwave background radiation in the adiabatic and entropic theories of galaxy formation". Soviet Astronomy. 22: 523–528. Bibcode:1978SvA....22..523D.
- Doroshkevich, A. G.; Kotok, E. V.; Novikov, I. D.; Polyudov, A. N.; Shandarin, S. F.; Sigov, Y. S. (1980). "Two-dimensional simulation of the gravitational system dynamics and formation of the large-scale structure of the Universe". Monthly Notices of the Royal Astronomical Society. 192 (2): 321–337. Bibcode:1980MNRAS.192..321D. doi:10.1093/mnras/192.2.321.
- Doroshkevich, A. G.; Naselsky, P. D.; Verkhodanov, O. V.; Novikov, D. I.; Turchaninov, V. I.; Novikov, I. D.; Christensen, P. R.; Chiang, L.-Y. (2005). "Gauss–Legendre sky pixelization (GLESP) for CMB maps". International Journal of Modern Physics D. 14 (2): 275–290. arXiv:astro-ph/0305537. Bibcode:2005IJMPD..14..275D. doi:10.1142/s0218271805006183. S2CID 9735005.
