= Project Echo =

1960s NASA satellite communication experiment

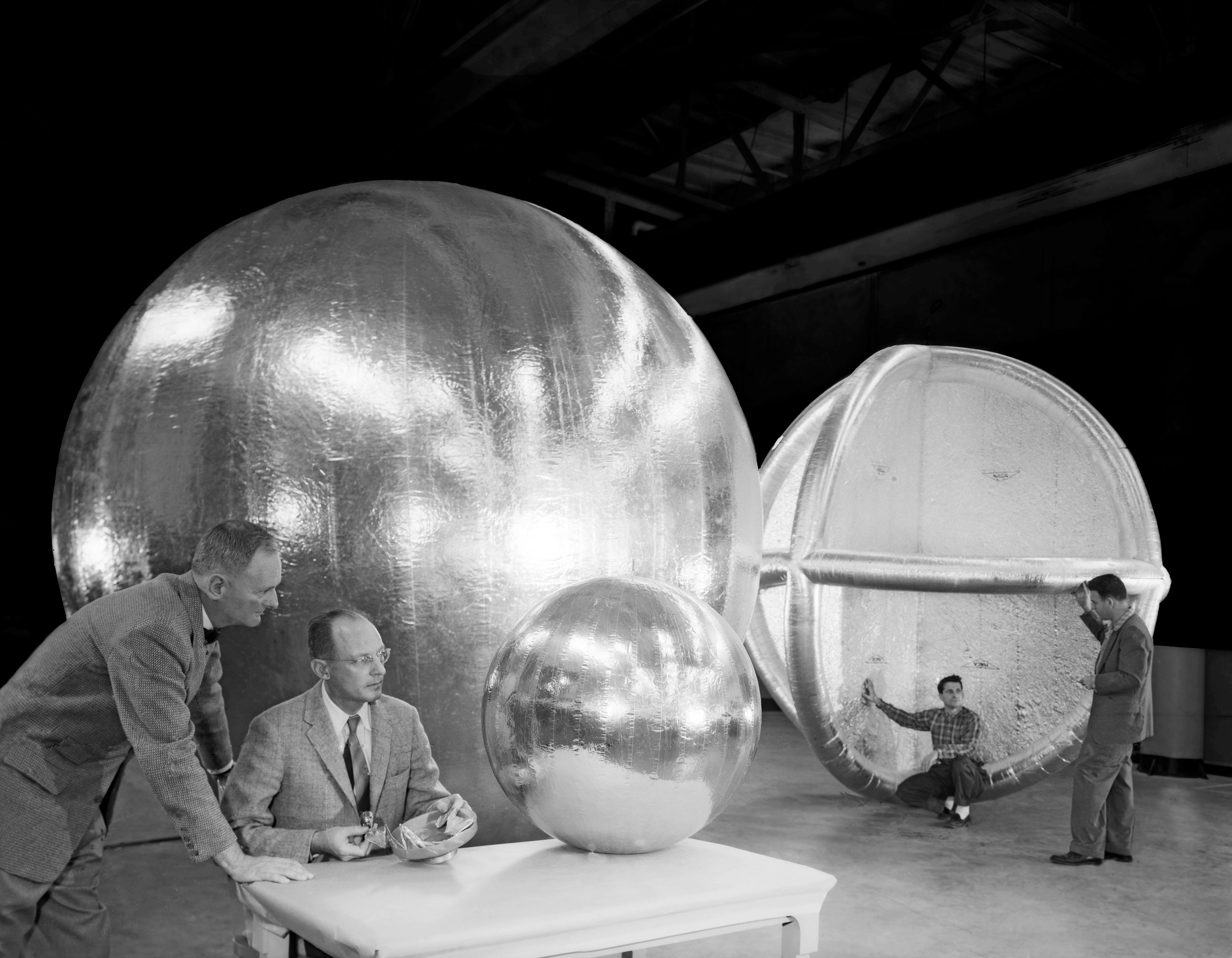
William J. O'Sullivan at desk with folded subsatellite, 30-inch subsatellite, 12-foot subsatellite, and corner reflector.

Project Echo was a passive communications satellite experiment designed by the American National Aeronautics and Space Agency (NASA) as the first test of man-made satellite communication in history. Each of the two spacecraft, launched in 1960 and 1964, were metalized balloon satellites acting as passive reflectors of microwave signals. Communication signals were transmitted from one location on Earth and bounced off the surface of the satellite to another Earth location.

The first transmissions using Echo were sent from Goldstone, California, to Crawford Hill in Holmdel, New Jersey, on 12 August 1960. The last Echo satellite deorbited and burned up in the atmosphere on 7 June 1969.

== Background ==
AT&T Bell Labs video about Project Echo and the engineers who conducted the effort.

The concept of using orbital satellites to relay communications predated space travel, first being advanced by Arthur C. Clarke in 1945. Experiments using the moon as a passive reflecting way station for messages began as early as 1946. With the launching of Sputnik 1, Earth's first artificial satellite, in 1957, interest quickly developed in orbiting communications satellites.

In July 1958, at a US Air Force sponsored meeting on communications satellites, Bell Telephone Laboratories engineer John R. Pierce put forth a presentation on passive satellite relay, describing how a reflective orbiting body could be used to bounce transmissions from one point on the Earth to another. William H. Pickering, director of Jet Propulsion Laboratory (JPL), also attended the conference and suggested that JPL facilities, specifically a 26 m (85 ft) diameter polar-mounted antenna installed near Goldstone Dry Lake in the Mojave Desert, might be used as a ground facility for experiments with such a satellite.

In October 1958, Pierce, along with fellow Bell engineer Rudolf Kompfner, designed an experiment to observe atmospheric refractive effects using reflective balloon satellites. Believing the experiment would advance research toward transoceanic communications via satellites, the two engineers presented a paper advocating for the launch of balloon satellites to be used as passive communications reflectors to the National Symposium on Extended Range and Space Communication on 6 and 7 October 1958.

That same month, the National Aeronautics and Space Administration (NASA) was formed, and two months later JPL was transferred from the United States Army to the new agency. Project Echo, NASA's first communications satellite project, was officially laid out in a 22 January 1959 meeting with representatives from NASA, JPL, and Bell Telephone Laboratories setting the initial launch for September 1959.

== Objectives ==
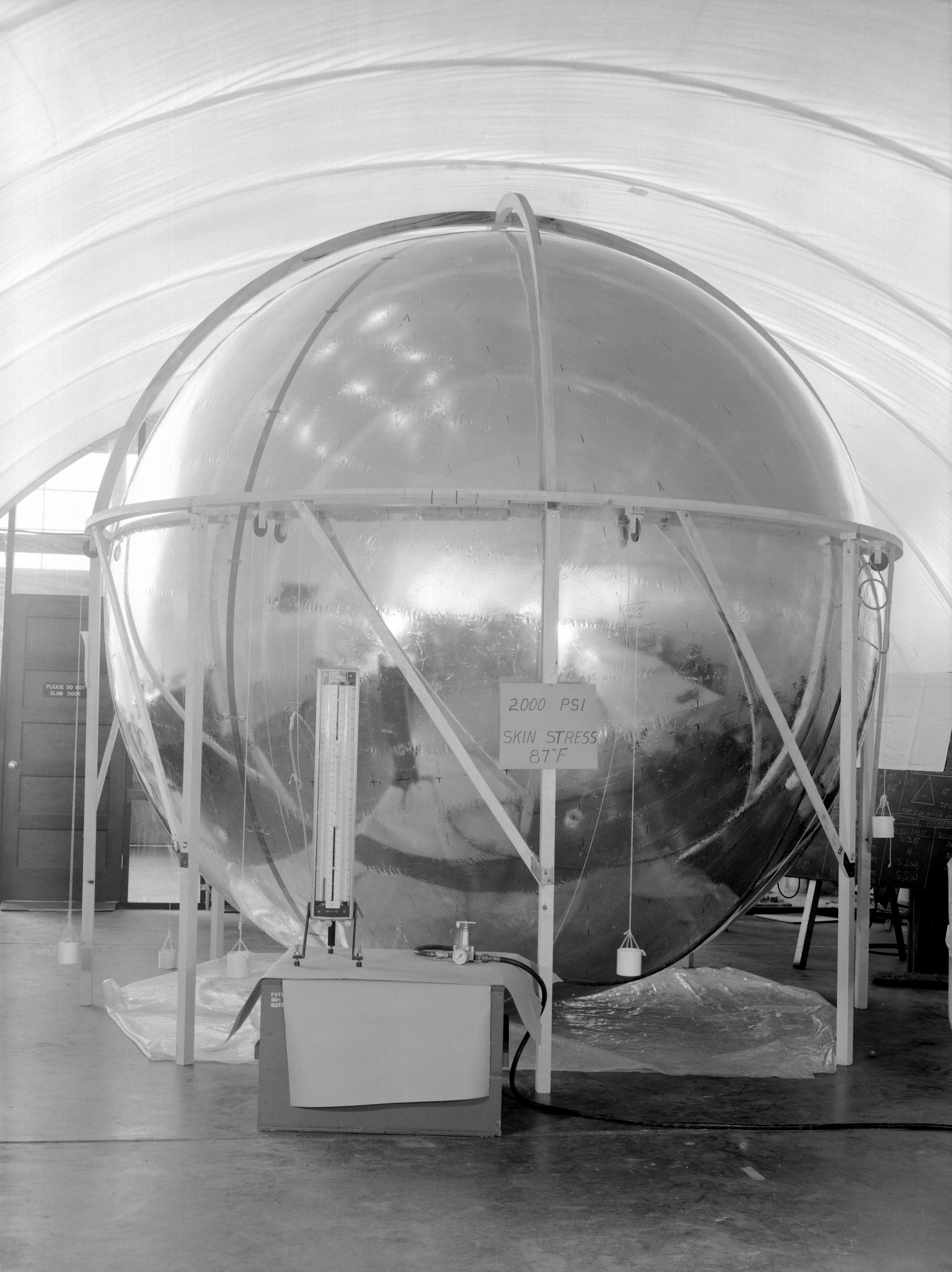
Scale prototype of the Echo satellites undergoing a skin stress test on 1 May 1960.

Project Echo was a pathfinder mission with the objective of testing new technologies and preparing for future missions. Spaceflight engineers used Echo to prove new ideas and test limits in aerodynamics, satellite shape and size, construction materials, temperature control and satellite tracking. Echo was designed as an experiment to demonstrate the potential of satellite communications, not to function as a global communications system.

Echo was designed, approved and built with the following objectives:

- Observe and measure the effects of atmospheric drag
- Passively reflect ground based transmissions
- Demonstrate two-way communications
- Demonstrate commitment to the development of an American space program
- Provide precedent for the overflight of other nations by surveillance satellites

All of these objectives were accomplished with Project Echo. Further experiments used the satellite to engage a two-way telephone conversation on 15 August 1960 and to relay a live television transmission in April 1962.

== Ground stations ==
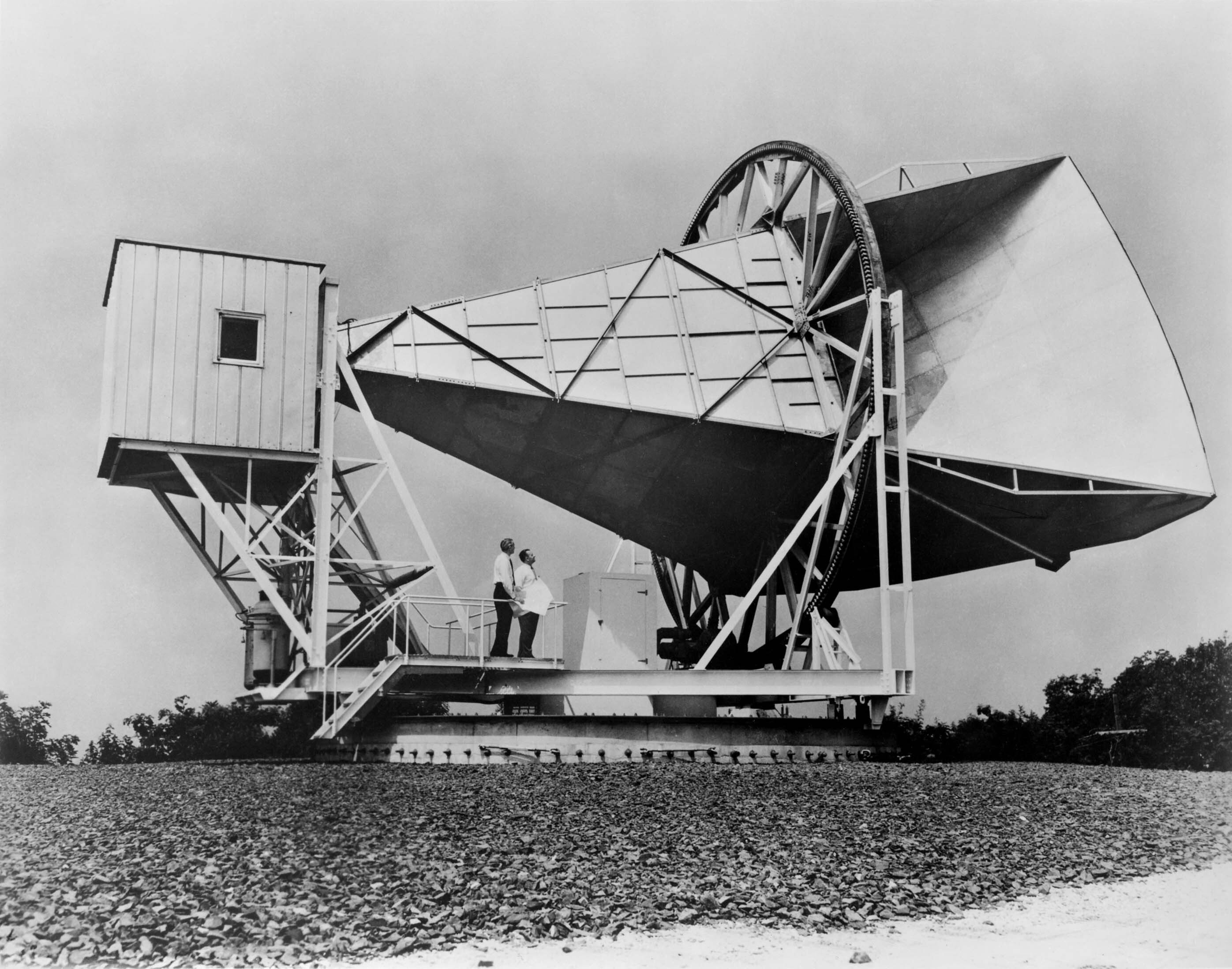
Holmdel Horn Antenna, constructed for Project Echo, and later used to discover the cosmic microwave background radiation.

Two ground stations were used for testing Project Echo. The Goldstone facility located at Goldstone Dry Lake in the Mojave Desert, California and the Crawford Hill facility located at Holmdel, New Jersey. Both sites used separate antennas for transmitting and receiving. West-to-east transmissions were sent from Goldstone by a 26 m (85 ft) dish antenna built for Project Echo by JPL. The signals were received at Crawford Hill by a 6 × 6 m (20 × 20 ft) aperture horn-reflector antenna. Horn antennas were known to have low-noise properties. A transmission frequency of 2390 megahertz was selected, as this was the planned frequency band for future satellite experiments. East-to-west transmissions were sent from Crawford Hill using a 18 m (59 ft) diameter parabolic antenna and received at Goldstone using the existing Pioneer program antenna. A transmission frequency of 960.05 megahertz was used for westbound communications because the JPL receiver was already tuned to this frequency from the Pioneer lunar program.

Satellite acquisition and tracking were accomplished by three methods: optical, digital slave, and automatic radar. Optical tracking was the easiest method but could only be used at night when the Sun illuminated the satellite. Broad and narrow field telescopes with a television camera were mounted to the structure of the antenna at each site. The camera images were displayed to a servo operator who would control the position of the antenna to track the satellite. When optical tracking could not be used, a computer system called digital slave could acquire and track Echo. Digital slave worked by receiving primary tracking data from the NASA Minitrack network of stations. The computer would then issue antenna-pointing commands to control the antenna. The third tracking method was a continuous-wave radar subsystem. Radar was not suitable for acquisition of the satellite, but once Echo was acquired by optical, or digital slave, radar signals could be used to automatically maintain tracking.

== Spacecraft ==
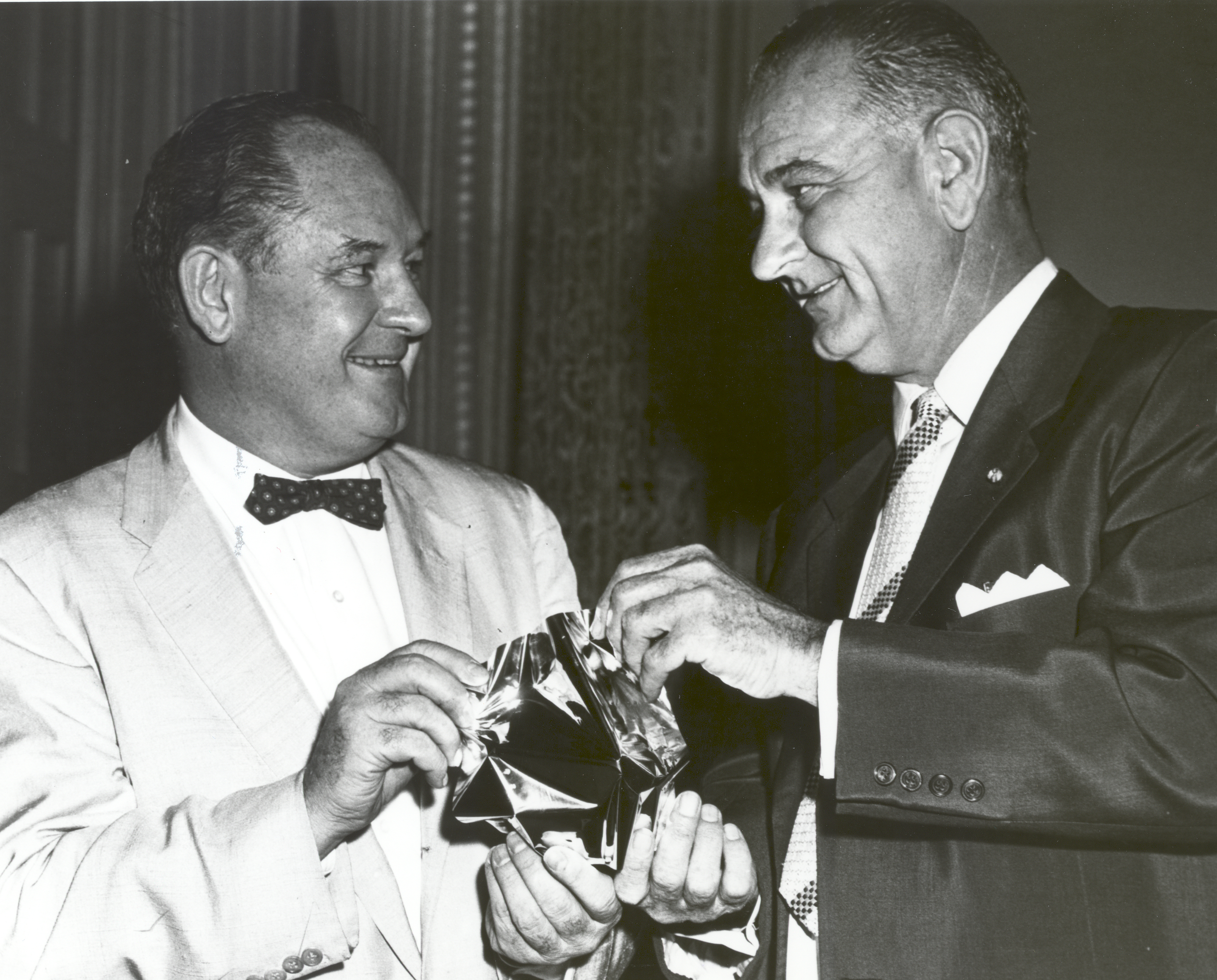
T. Keith Glennan shows LBJ aluminized Mylar film used to make Echo I

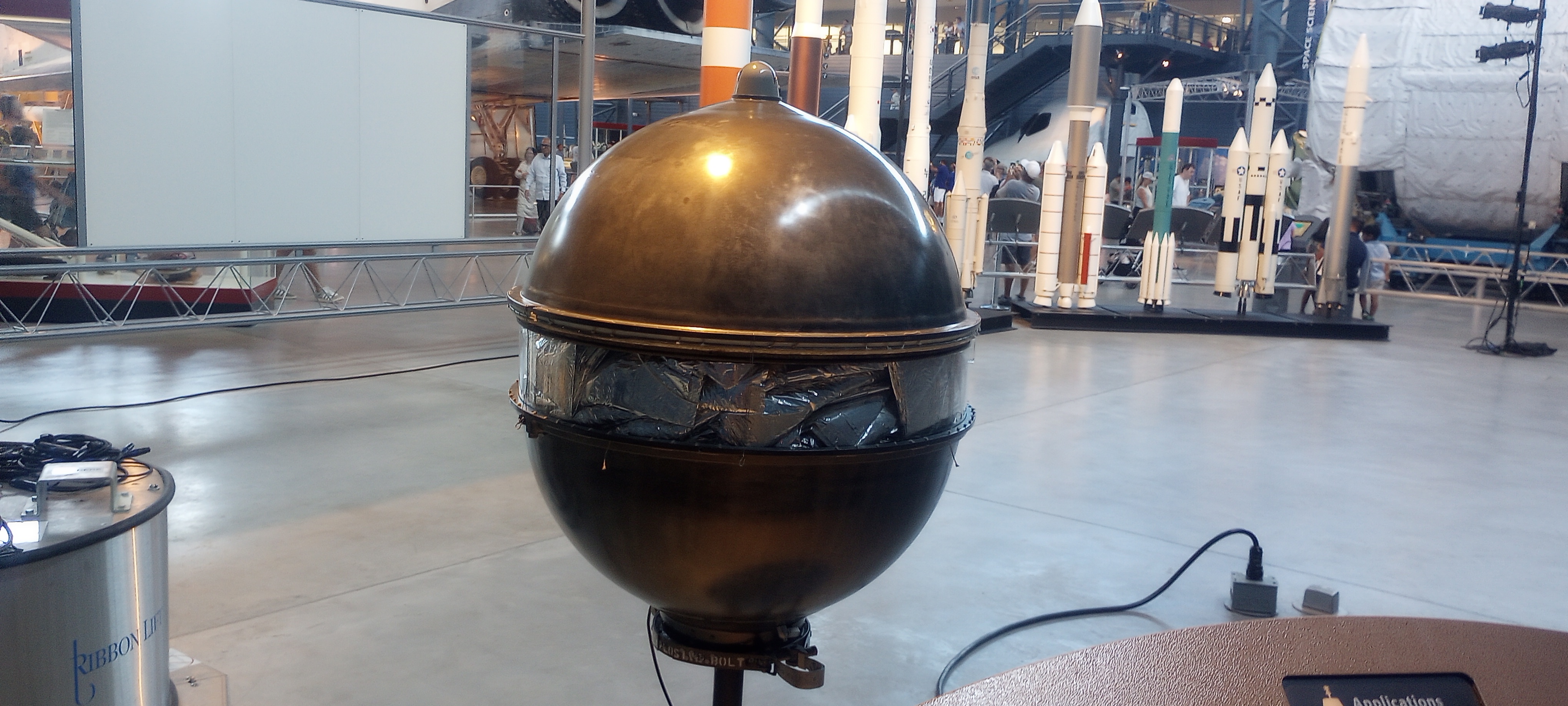
Echo 1 flight spare in its launch canister at the Steven F. Udvar-Hazy Center

The Echo spacecraft (Echo 1, Echo 1A, and Echo 2) were large thin skinned spheres that were inflated in orbit after leaving the atmosphere. These balloon satellites were approximately 30 m (98 ft) in diameter with a thin skin made of Mylar (a trade name for stretched polyethylene terephthalate or BoPET), and were built by Gilmore Schjeldahl's G.T. Schjeldahl Company in Northfield, Minnesota. The satellites functioned as a reflector, not a transceiver; after being placed in low Earth orbit, signals could be sent from a ground station, reflected by its surface, and returned to Earth.

As its shiny surface was also reflective in the range of visible light, Echo was easily visible to the unaided eye over most of the Earth. The spacecraft was nicknamed a "satelloon" by those involved in the project (a portmanteau combining satellite and balloon). It was used to redirect transcontinental and intercontinental telephone, radio, and television signals. During the latter portion of its life, it was used to evaluate the technical feasibility of satellite triangulation.

=== Echo 1 ===
Echo 1A
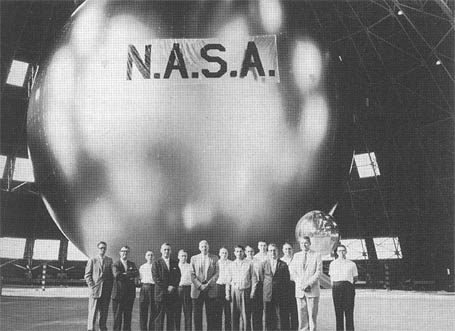
- Echo 1 sits fully inflated at a Navy hangar in Weeksville, North Carolina.
- Names: ECHO 1 NASA A-11
- Mission type: Communications
- Operator: NASA
- Harvard designation: 1960 Iota 1
- COSPAR ID: 1960-009A
- SATCAT no.: 00049
- Mission duration: 7.75 years (achieved)

Spacecraft properties
- Bus: ECHO
- Manufacturer: Bell Labs
- Launch mass: 180 kg (400 lb)
- Dimensions: 30.48 m (100.0 ft) diameter sphere when inflated

Start of mission
- Launch date: 12 August 1960, 03:39:43 GMT
- Rocket: Thor DM-19 Delta (Thor 270 / Delta 2)
- Launch site: Cape Canaveral, LC-17A
- Contractor: Douglas Aircraft Company

End of mission
- Decay date: 25 May 1968

Orbital parameters
- Reference system: Geocentric orbit
- Regime: Low Earth orbit
- Perigee altitude: 1,524 km (947 mi)
- Apogee altitude: 1,684 km (1,046 mi)
- Inclination: 47.2°
- Period: 118.3 minutes

Echo 1 was 30 m (98 ft) in diameter, had a non-rigid skin made of 12.7 μm (0.00050 in)-thick Mylar, and had a total mass of 180 kg (400 lb), weighing 71 kg (157 lb) at launch. During ground inflation tests, 18,000 kg (40,000 lb) of air were needed to fill the balloon, but while in orbit, several pounds of gas were all that was required to fill the sphere. To address the problem of meteorite punctures and keep the sphere inflated, Echo 1 included a 15.12 kg (33.3 lb) make-up gas system using two types of sublimating powders – 9.1 kg (20 lb) of anthraquinone and 4.6 kg (10 lb) of benzoic acid. It also had 107.9 MHz telemetry beacons, powered by five nickel-cadmium batteries that were charged by 70 solar cells mounted on the balloon. The spacecraft was useful to the calculation of atmospheric density and solar pressure, due to its large area-to-mass ratio. It was held together with Schjelbond, a proprietary adhesive developed by the Schjeldahl company.

=== Echo 2 ===
Echo 2
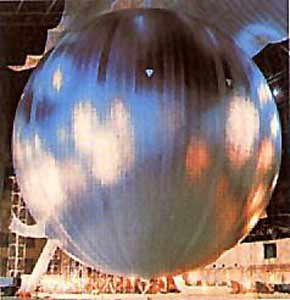
- Echo 2
- Names: NASA A-12
- Mission type: Communications
- Operator: NASA
- COSPAR ID: 1964-004A
- SATCAT no.: 00740
- Mission duration: 5.5 years (achieved)

Spacecraft properties
- Bus: ECHO
- Manufacturer: Bell Labs
- Dimensions: 41 m (135 ft) diameter sphere when inflated

Start of mission
- Launch date: 25 January 1964, 13:59:04 GMT
- Rocket: Thor-Agena B (Thor 397 / Agena 6301 / TA-2)
- Launch site: Vandenberg, LC-75-1-1 (SLC-2E)
- Contractor: Douglas Aircraft Company (Thor); Lockheed Martin (Agena)

End of mission
- Decay date: 7 June 1969

Orbital parameters
- Reference system: Geocentric orbit
- Regime: Low Earth orbit
- Perigee altitude: 1,029 km (639 mi)
- Apogee altitude: 1,316 km (818 mi)
- Inclination: 81.5°
- Period: 108.95 minutes

Echo 2 was a 41.1 m (135 ft)-diameter balloon satellite, the last launched by Project Echo. A revised inflation system was used for the balloon, to improve its smoothness and sphericity. Echo 2's skin was rigidizable, unlike that of Echo 1. Therefore, the balloon was capable of maintaining its shape without a constant internal pressure; a long-term supply of inflation gas was not needed, and it could easily survive strikes from micrometeoroids. The balloon was constructed from a 9 μm (0.00035 in)-thick mylar film sandwiched between and bonded with two layers of 4.5 μm (0.00018 in)-thick aluminum foil. It was inflated to a pressure that caused the metal layers of the laminate to plastically deform slightly, while the polymer was still in the elastic range. This resulted in a rigid and very smooth spherical shell. A beacon telemetry system provided a tracking signal, monitored spacecraft skin temperature between −120 and +16 °C (−184 and 61 °F), and measured the internal pressure of the spacecraft between 0.00005 mm of mercury and 0.5 mm of mercury, especially during the initial inflation stages. The system consisted of two beacon assemblies powered by solar cell panels and had a minimum power output of 45 mW at 136.02 MHz and 136.17 MHz.

== Flights ==
Five suborbital ballistic tests to determine whether the launch, deploy, and expansion mechanisms would work were flown using the Shotput test vehicle, a two-stage rocket. The first Shotput flew at 5:40 pm on 27 October 1959. Shotput 1 successfully delivered the Echo prototype to the desired altitude, but a small amount of residual gas in the folds of the balloon violently expanded, bursting the test article. People up and down the Atlantic coast witnessed what looked like distant fireworks as thousands of pieces of shredded Mylar reflected sunlight in a display that lasted for about 10 minutes. Four more Shotput tests were flown on 16 January, 27 February, 1 April, and 31 May 1960.

On 13 May 1960, the first attempt to orbit an Echo satellite was made. The mission, which was also the maiden voyage of the Thor-Delta launch vehicle, failed before deployment of the payload. Echo 1 lifted off from Cape Canaveral's LC-17A, and the Thor stage performed properly, but during the coasting phase, the attitude control jets on the unproven Delta stage failed to ignite, sending the payload into the Atlantic Ocean instead of into orbit.

On 12 August 1960, Echo 1A (commonly referred to as Echo 1) was successfully put into an orbit of 944 to 1,048 mi (1,519 to 1,687 km) by another Thor-Delta. A microwave transmission from the JPL Goldstone facility in California, was relayed by the satellite to Bell Laboratories in Holmdel, New Jersey, that same day. It was originally expected that Echo 1A would not survive long after its fourth dip into the atmosphere in July 1963, although estimates allowed the possibility that it would continue to orbit until 1964 or beyond. It ended up surviving much longer than expected, and finally reentered Earth's atmosphere and burned up on 24 May 1968.

On 25 January 1964, Echo 2 was launched on a Thor Agena launch vehicle. In addition to passive communications experiments, it was used to investigate the dynamics of large spacecraft and for global geometric geodesy. Since it was larger than Echo 1A and orbiting in a near-polar orbit, Echo 2 was conspicuously visible to the unaided eye over all of the Earth. It reentered Earth's atmosphere and burned up on 7 June 1969.

Both Echo 1A and Echo 2 experienced a solar sail effect due to their large size and low mass. Later passive communications satellites, such as OV1-08 PasComSat, solved the problems associated with this by using a grid-sphere design instead of a covered surface. Later yet, NASA abandoned passive communications systems altogether, in favor of active satellites.

=== Launch table ===
Launches related to Project Echo
Date	Site	Vehicle	Payload	Result
1959-10-28	Wallops	Shotput	Echo test	Success
1960-01-16	Wallops	Shotput	Echo test	Partial success
1960-02-27	Wallops	Shotput	Echo test	Partial success
1960-04-01	Wallops	Shotput	Echo test	Success
1960-05-13	LC-17A	Delta 144	Echo 1	Failure
1960-05-31	Wallops	Shotput	Echo test	Success
1960-08-12	LC-17A	Delta 270	Echo 1A	Success
1962-01-15	LC-17A	Thor-DSV2D 337	AVT 1 (Application Vertical Tests 1)	Failure
1962-07-18	LC-17A	Thor-DSV2D 338	AVT 2 (Application Vertical Tests 2)	Success
1964-01-25	Va 75-1-1	Thor-DM21 Agena-B 397	Echo 2	Success

== Legacy ==
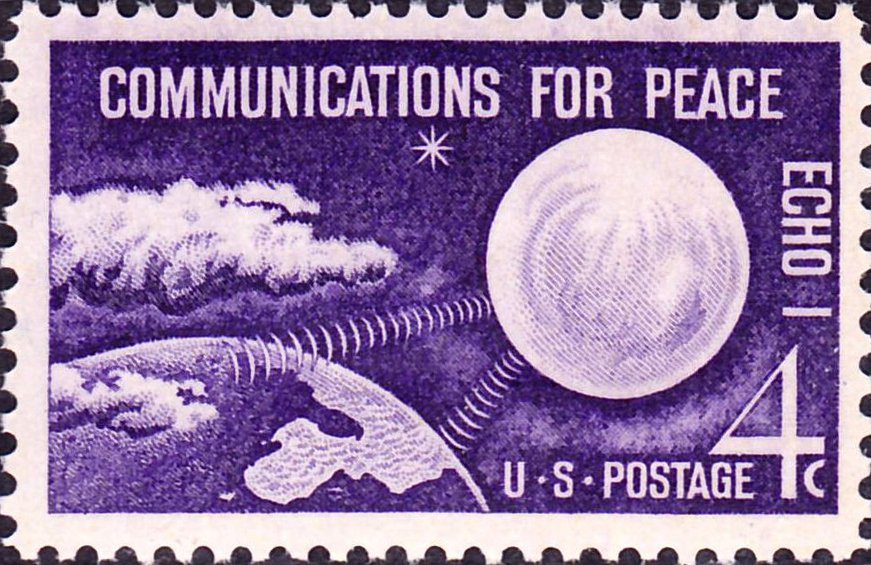
Echo 1 stamp – 1960 issue

Project Echo facilitated the first successful satellite transmission and first two way communications between the JPL Goldstone facility and Bell Telephone Laboratories facility in Holmdel, New Jersey. Other groups participated in experiments including the Collins Radio Company and the Naval Research laboratory. Because Echo was only a passive system, it was primarily useful in demonstrating the future potential of satellite communications and became obsolete before it deorbited in 1968. Echo was most known to the general public for its visibility as it could be seen at night with the naked eye.

The Echo satellite program also provided the astronomical reference points required to accurately locate Moscow. This improved accuracy was sought by the U.S. military for the purpose of targeting intercontinental ballistic missiles.

The large horn antenna at Holmdel constructed by Bell Labs for the Echo project was later used by Arno Penzias and Robert Woodrow Wilson for their Nobel Prize-winning discovery of the cosmic microwave background radiation.

On 15 December 1960, the U.S. Post Office issued a postage stamp depicting Echo 1.

== See also ==
- AO-51, AMSAT-OSCAR 51 (also known as Phase 2E, or ECHO) – an amateur radio communications satellite launched in 2004
- Courier 1B – world's first active repeater satellite, launched in 1960
- List of communications satellite firsts
- PAGEOS – a similar balloon satellite project
- Project SCORE – world's first communications satellite, launched in 1958
- Telstar – first active, direct relay communications satellite, launched in 1962
- TransHab, a subsequent expandable spacecraft technology project pursued by NASA
- U.S. space exploration history on U.S. stamps
- Norman L. Crabill
