= Crawford Hill =

Hill in New Jersey, United States

Coordinates: 40°23′28″N 74°11′07″W

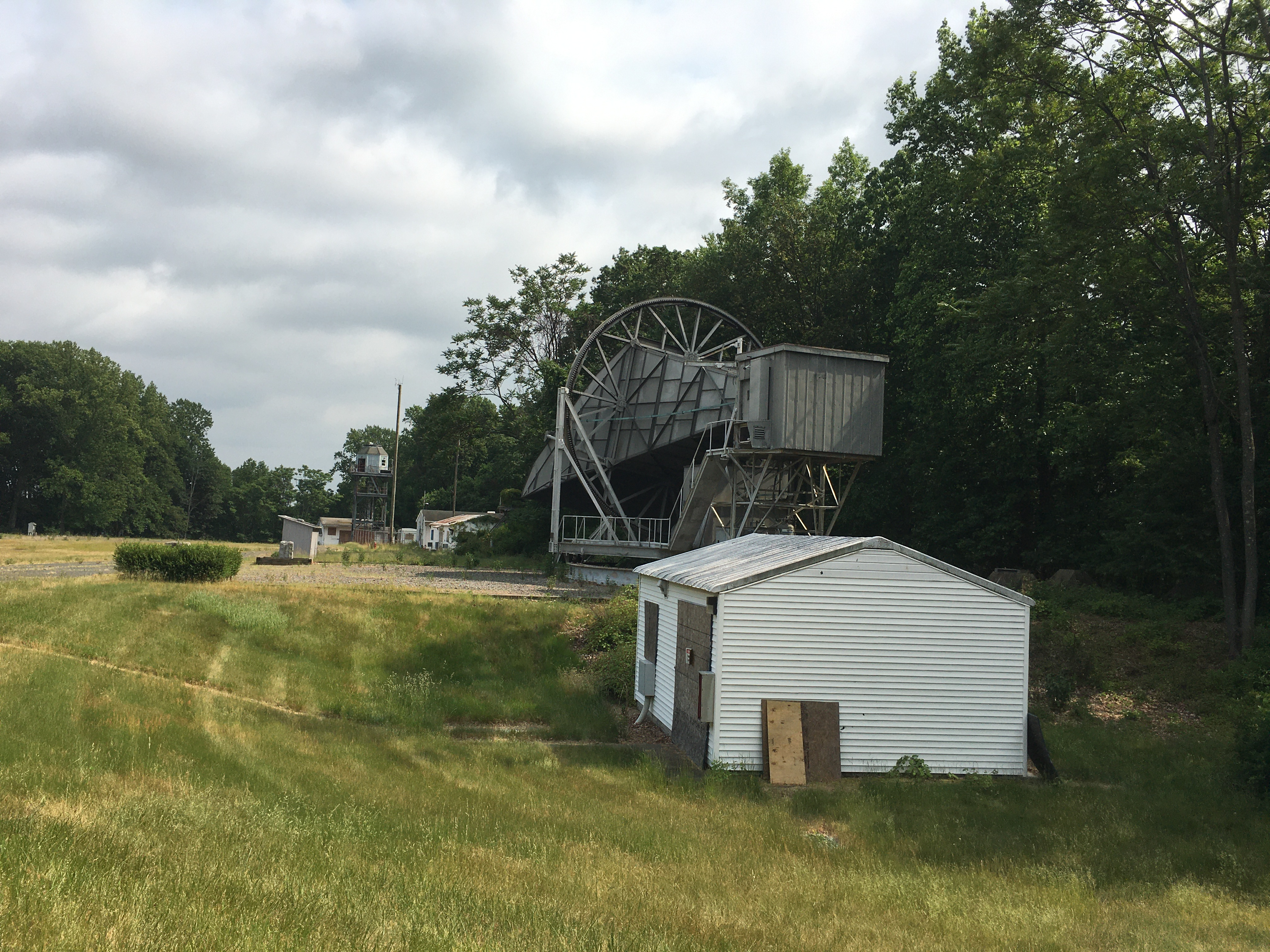
The Holmdel Horn Antenna and other structures of the Bell Labs annex complex atop Crawford Hill, as seen in 2023 when it was described as comprising "a cluster of shacks and sheds" that "could be mistaken for an old mining camp you might come across" in the American mountain west.

Crawford Hill, sometimes known in the past as Crawford's Hill, is located in Holmdel Township, New Jersey, United States. It is Monmouth County's highest point, as well as the highest point in New Jersey's coastal plain, standing 391 feet (119 m) above sea level. The hill is best known as the site of a Bell Telephone Laboratories facility that was an annex to the Bell Labs Holmdel Complex located three miles away. The 43-acre (17 ha) annex property comprises a main research building and a number of other structures and scientific instruments, among them the historic Holmdel Horn Antenna.

== The hill ==
Crawford Hill is part of the cuesta known as the Atlantic highlands landform of New Jersey. In such form it the highest of a series of rolling crests that recede from the shoreline. In the past it was a wooded area overlooking the first farms in the area. It is named after one of the longstanding, prominent families of Holmdel, a name which goes back to an early figure in the area, William H. Crawford. Its height was determined at least as early as 1888.

Around 1900, part of Crawford Hill was leveled to make an easier through route for the Holmdel and Keyport Turnpike. In the 1920s, driving over the hill was considered one of the rewarding local routes that the new generation of motorists could undertake. By the 1930s, the hill had a number of roadways on it as well as several working gravel pits that were WPA projects.

Crawford Hill overlooks the Garden State Parkway; on the other side of that road is Telegraph Hill and the formerly named Garden State Arts Center. If a view were to be unobstructed, Lower New York Bay can be seen as well as some of the New York skyline.

During the 1940s and 1950s, the hill was used by the Jersey Shore Amateur Radio Association to compete in contests run by the American Radio Relay League involving the setting up of a field station and then contacting the most other amateur stations; the association came in first in the contests held in 1946 and again in 1958.

Crawford Hill has also been known as a good location at which to find fossils.

== Bell Telephone Laboratories on the hill ==
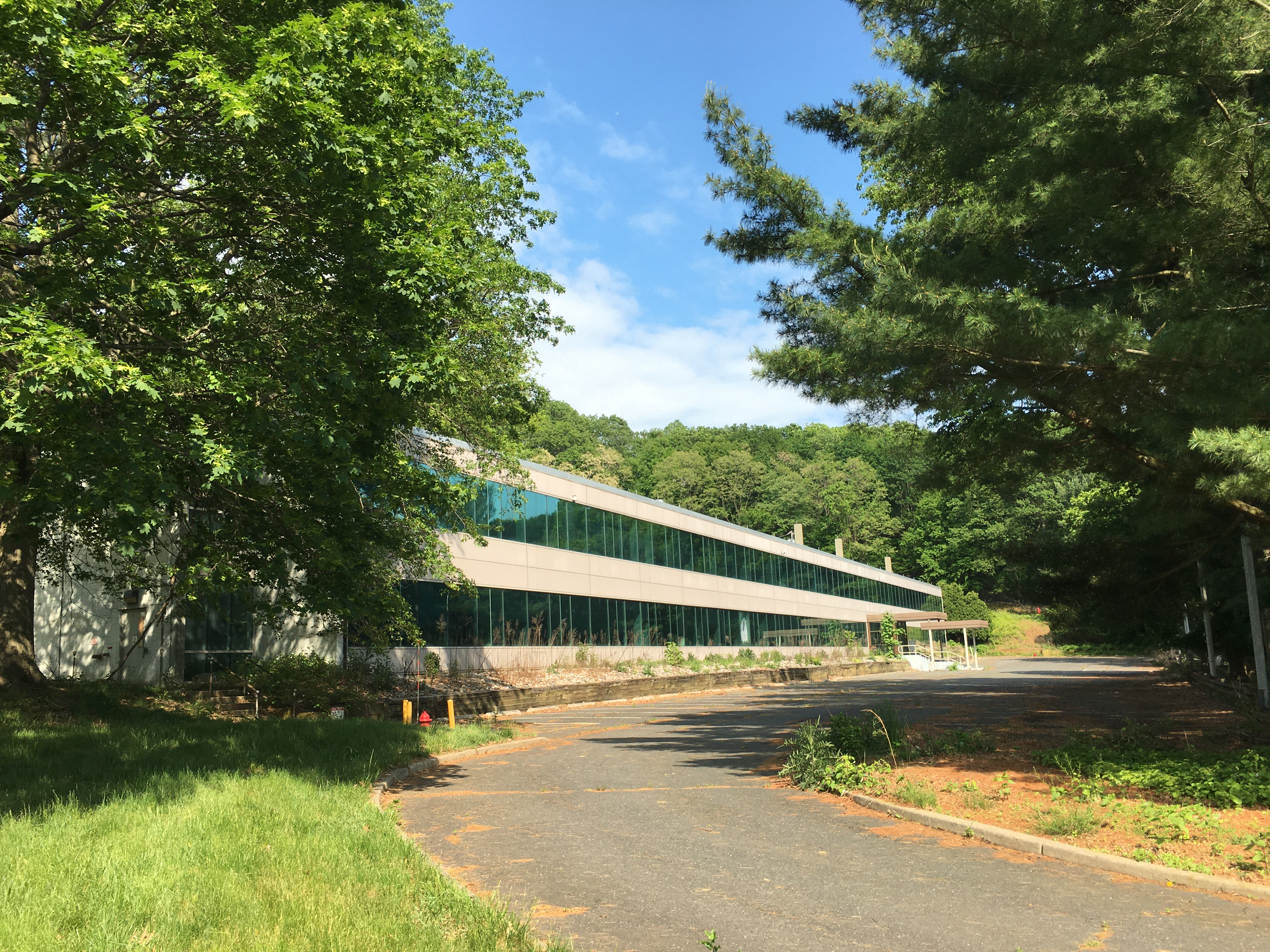
The main Bell Telephone Laboratories building on Crawford Hill, opened in 1962

Bell Telephone Laboratories first acquired property in Holmdel Township in 1929. Work on radio astronomy, such as that conducted by Karl Jansky, had been undertaken nearby in the early 1930s at the main site of what would later become the Bell Labs Holmdel Complex, as would many other developments in communications developments.

By 1950, Crawford Hill was being used by Bell Telephone Laboratories for experiments and studies in microwave transmission, with an earlier horn antenna at the Crawford location receiving signals transmitted from a tower 22 miles away at the Bell Labs facility in Murray Hill, New Jersey.

During 1955, a 60-foot parabolic antenna, nicknamed "The Big Dish", was constructed atop Crawford Hill. It was intended for use with super high frequency transmissions of telephone and television signals, as well as exploring aspects of over-the-horizon transmission. The antenna project was led by Arthur B. Crawford, John C. Schelleng, and Harald T. Friis. The 60-foot antenna was prominent enough to be seen by motorists traveling on the Garden State Parkway.

In 1959, construction began on the Holmdel Horn Antenna, whose purpose would be to receive radio signals bounced off a satellite by a transmitter at the Jet Propulsion Laboratory in Goldstone, California, while the Big Dish would continue to send signals in the other direction. This became Project Echo, which in 1960 achieved success as the first passive communications satellite experiment. The first message so sent was a taped greeting by President Dwight D. Eisenhower. Also in 1960, the 60-foot antenna at Crawford Hill was used to transmit and bounce a radio signal off the Moon that was received at Goldstone.

At the same time that the mammoth Bell Labs Holmdel Complex was built, a much smaller and less elaborate two-story building was constructed on Crawford Hill to house the Project Echo-related researchers there. This was in 1962, and the new building housed some 140 people working on waveguides and masers in addition to microwave radio, antennas, and satellite communications.

With Project Echo completed, Arno Penzias and Robert Wilson of Bell Labs used the Holmdel Horn Antenna located on Crawford Hill to take measurements of the cosmic microwave background radiation. This occurred by happenstance starting in 1964, when they detected what appeared to be a steady noise interfering with their observations. The pair were awarded the 1978 Nobel Prize in Physics for these efforts that supported the Big Bang theory. Likewise commemorated was the Holmdel Horn Antenna, which in 1988 was designated a National Historic Landmark.

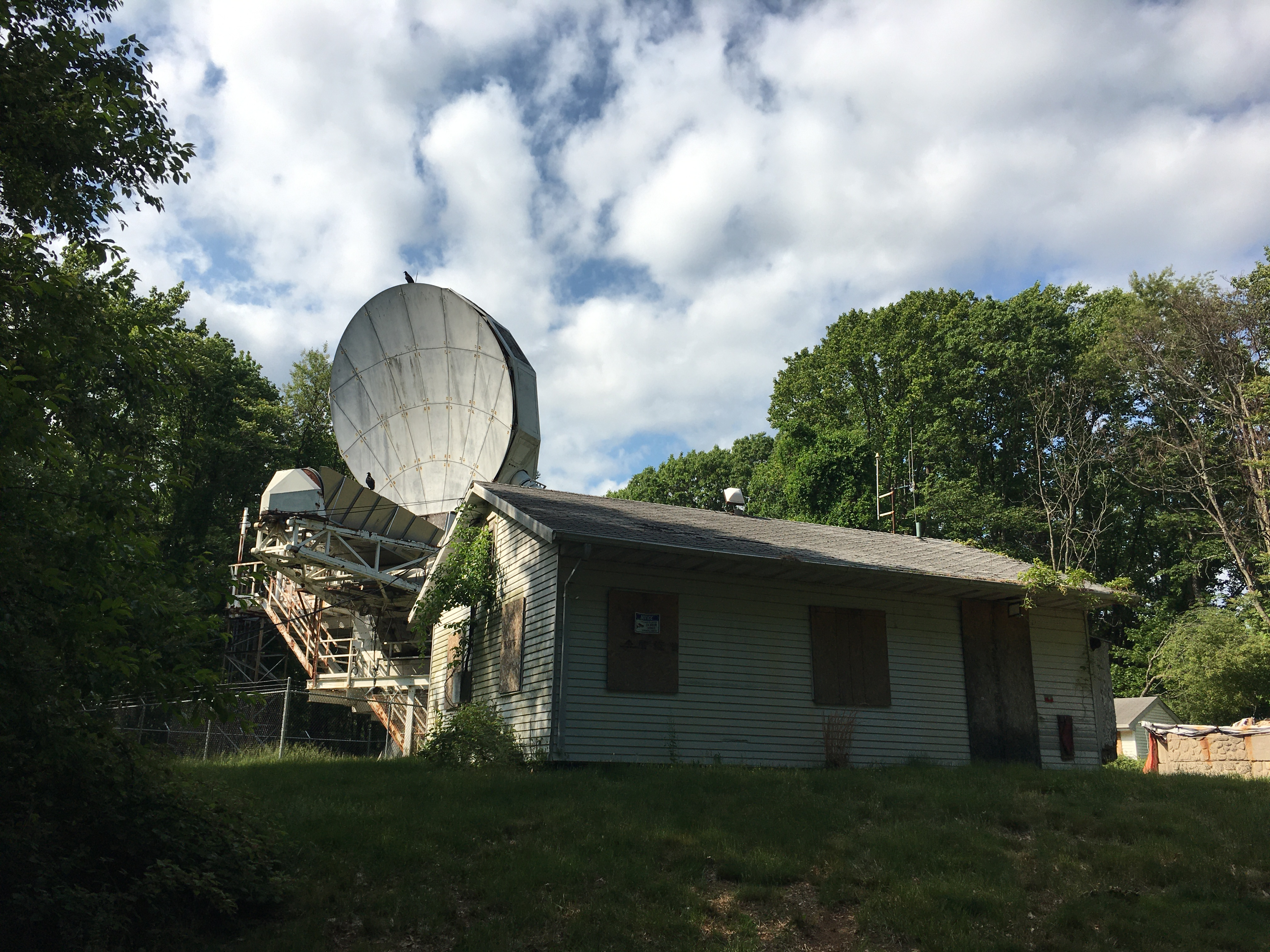
A 7-meter antenna with its control building, also present at the Crawford Hill annex

Later the laboratory undertook research in the fields of wireless and fiber-optic communication, and award-winning Bell Laboratories researchers in these fields, working at Crawford Hill included Herwig Kogelnik and Gerard Foschini.

Herwig Kogelnik won the 2001 Marconi International Fellowship Award and IEEE Medal of Honor for his work in the development of fiber optic technology and the 2006 National Medal of Technology.

Gerard J. Foschini was the 2002 recipient of the Thomas Alva Edison Patent Award for his pioneering inventions having to do with the capacity of communications systems with multiple antennas.

As did Bell Laboratories itself, ownership of the annex went from AT&T Corporation to Lucent to Alcatel-Lucent to Nokia. The large Bell Labs Holmdel Complex was shut down in 2007, but the annex carried on for a while. Then in October 2019, the annex was put up for sale.

In January 2021, Nokia sold the main research building along with the rest of the 43-acre property, for a sum of around $3.6 million, to a private individual. It relocated the remaining 66 Bell Labs research staff to the Murray Hill campus. The sale ended a six-decade-long presence of Bell Labs in Monmouth County, one that had helped the county prosper economically.

== Plans for site going forward ==
The main building soon fell into a somewhat dilapidated state, matching much of the rest of the annex structures.

The sale triggered an extended concern over whether the Crawford Hill site, and the Holmdel Horn Antenna within it, might be at risk due to developers coming in. Indeed, the buyer of the land put forth plans to build a senior housing center. The Holmdel Planning Board voted to study the issue during 2023. Neighbors, citizen preservation groups, and astronomy fans all objected to the development proposal, eventually collecting for a petition some 8,000 signatures from around the country and internationally. Holmdel officials considered using eminent domain to acquire the land involved.

Instead, in October 2023 a deal was reached between the township and the developer, wherein the Holmdel Township Committee did not acquire the entire site as many petitioners had hoped for, but did agree to pay $5.5 million for 35 acres (14 ha) of land, including that which the antenna sits on. In January 2024, the purchase of the 35 acres was closed, with plans to name it the Dr. Robert Wilson Park, although in what particular form the park would take was still to be determined. The two-story main building was part of what remained with the developer, with possible plans to develop it akin to the Bell Works use at the Bell Labs Holmdel Complex. Wilson, who in his late eighties lived a short distance from the site and still possessed working keys to the antenna, approved of the settlement.

== See also ==
- Geology of New Jersey
- Discovery of cosmic microwave background radiation
