= Holmdel Horn Antenna =

Microwave horn antenna in New Jersey, US

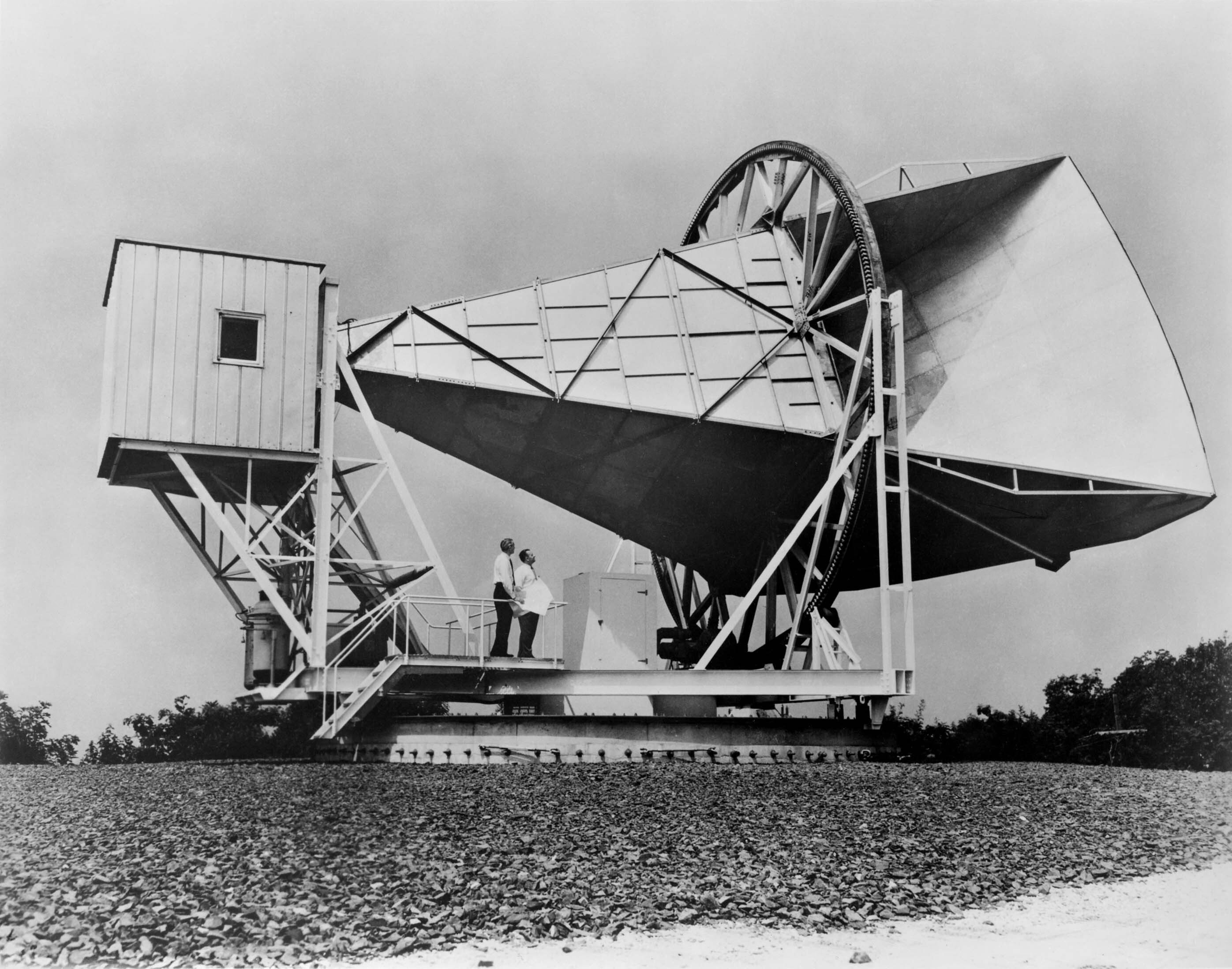
- Penzias and Wilson standing on the Holmdel Horn Antenna in 1962.
- Location: Holmdel Township, Monmouth County, New Jersey
- Coordinates: 40°23′27″N 74°11′05″W
- Diameter: 20 ft (6.1 m)
- Location within the United States
- Holmdel Horn Antenna
- U.S. National Register of Historic Places
- U.S. National Historic Landmark
- Location within Monmouth County, New Jersey Location within New Jersey Location within the United States
- Built: 1959
- Architect: A.B. Crawford
- NRHP reference No.: 89002457

Significant dates
- Added to NRHP: December 20, 1989
- Designated NHL: December 20, 1989
- Related media on Commons

The Holmdel Horn Antenna is a large microwave horn antenna that was used as a satellite communication antenna and radio telescope during the 1960s at the Bell Telephone Laboratories facility located on Crawford Hill in Holmdel Township, New Jersey, United States. It was designated a National Historic Landmark in 1989 because of its association with the research work of two radio astronomers, Arno Penzias and Robert Wilson.

In 1965, while using this antenna, Penzias and Wilson discovered the cosmic microwave background radiation (CMBR) that permeates the universe. This was one of the most important discoveries in physical cosmology since Edwin Hubble demonstrated in the 1920s that the universe was expanding. It provided the evidence that confirmed George Gamow's and Georges Lemaître's "Big Bang" theory of the creation of the universe. This helped change the science of cosmology, the study of the universe's history, from a field for unlimited theoretical speculation into a discipline of direct observation. In 1978 Penzias and Wilson received the Nobel Prize for Physics for their discovery.

== Description ==
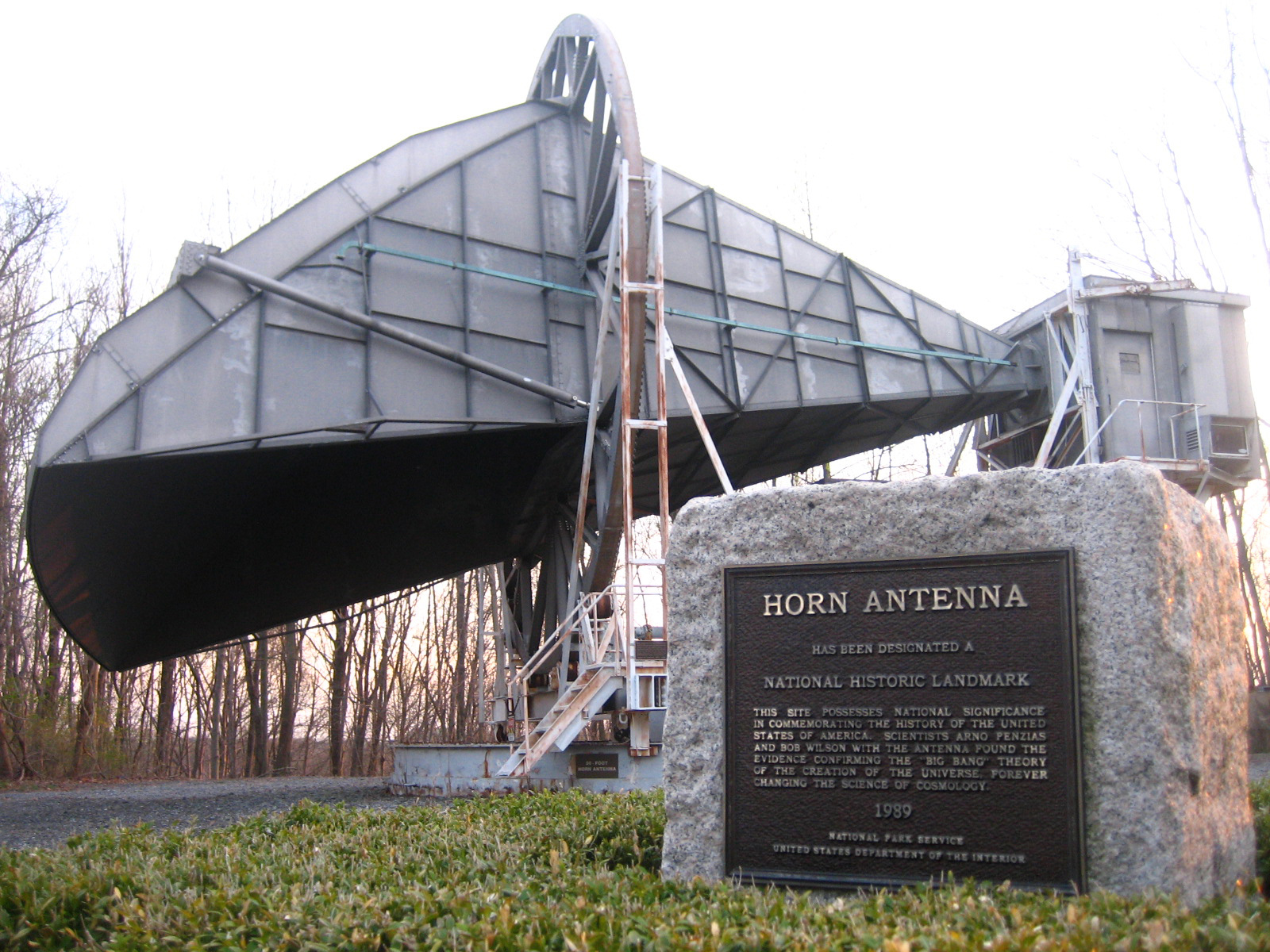
Bell Labs' horn antenna, April 2007

The horn antenna at Bell Telephone Laboratories in Holmdel, New Jersey, was constructed on Crawford Hill in 1959 to support Project Echo, the National Aeronautics and Space Administration's passive communications satellites, which used large aluminized plastic balloons (satellite balloon) as reflectors to bounce radio signals from one point on the Earth to another.

The antenna is 50 feet (15 m) in length with a radiating aperture of 20 by 20 feet (6.1 by 6.1 m) and is constructed of aluminum. The antenna's elevation wheel, which surrounds the midsection of the horn, is 30 feet (9.1 m) in diameter and supports the structure's weight using rollers mounted on a base frame. All axial or thrust loads are taken by a large ball bearing at the narrow apex end of the horn. The horn continues through this bearing into the equipment building or cab. The ability to locate receiver equipment at the horn apex, thus eliminating the noise contribution of a connecting line, is an important feature of the antenna. A radiometer for measuring the intensity of radiant energy is located in the cab.

The triangular base frame of the antenna is made from structural steel. It rotates on wheels about a center pintle ball bearing on a turntable track 30 feet (9.1 m) in diameter. The track consists of stress-relieved, planed steel plates individually adjusted to produce a track that is flat to about 1/64 inch (0.40 mm). The faces of the wheels are cone-shaped to minimize contact friction. A tangential force of 100 pounds (400 N) is sufficient to start the antenna rotating on the turntable. The antenna beam can be directed to any part of the sky using the turntable for azimuth adjustments and the elevation wheel to change the elevation angle or altitude above the horizon.

Except for the steel base frame, which a local steel company made, the Holmdel Laboratory shops fabricated and assembled the antenna under the direction of Mr. H. W. Anderson, who also collaborated on the design. Assistance in the design was also given by Messrs. R. O'Regan and S. A. Darby. Construction of the antenna was completed under the direction of Arthur Crawford.

When not in use, the turntable azimuth sprocket drive is disengaged, allowing the structure to "weathervane" and seek a position of minimum wind resistance. The antenna was designed to withstand winds of 100 miles per hour (160 km/h), and the entire structure weighs 18 short tons (16 tonnes).

A plastic clapboarded utility shed 10 by 20 feet (3.0 by 6.1 m) with two windows, a double door, and a sheet-metal roof, is located on the ground next to the antenna. This structure houses equipment and controls for the antenna and is included as a part of the designation as a National Historic Landmark.

== Technical ==
This type of antenna is called a Hogg or horn-reflector antenna, invented by Alfred C. Beck and Harald T. Friis in 1941. It was built by David C. Hogg. It consists of a flaring metal horn with a curved reflecting surface mounted in its mouth at a 45° angle to the long axis of the horn. The reflector is a segment of a parabolic reflector, so the antenna is a parabolic antenna that is fed off-axis. A Hogg horn combines several characteristics useful for radio astronomy. It is extremely broad-band, has calculable aperture efficiency, and the walls of the horn shield it from radiation coming from angles outside the main beam axis. Therefore, the back and side lobes are so minimal that scarcely any thermal energy is received from the ground. Consequently, it is an ideal radio telescope for accurately measuring low levels of weak background radiation. The antenna has a gain of about 43.3 dBi and a beamwidth of about 1.5° at 2.39 GHz and an aperture efficiency of 76%.

== Preservation ==
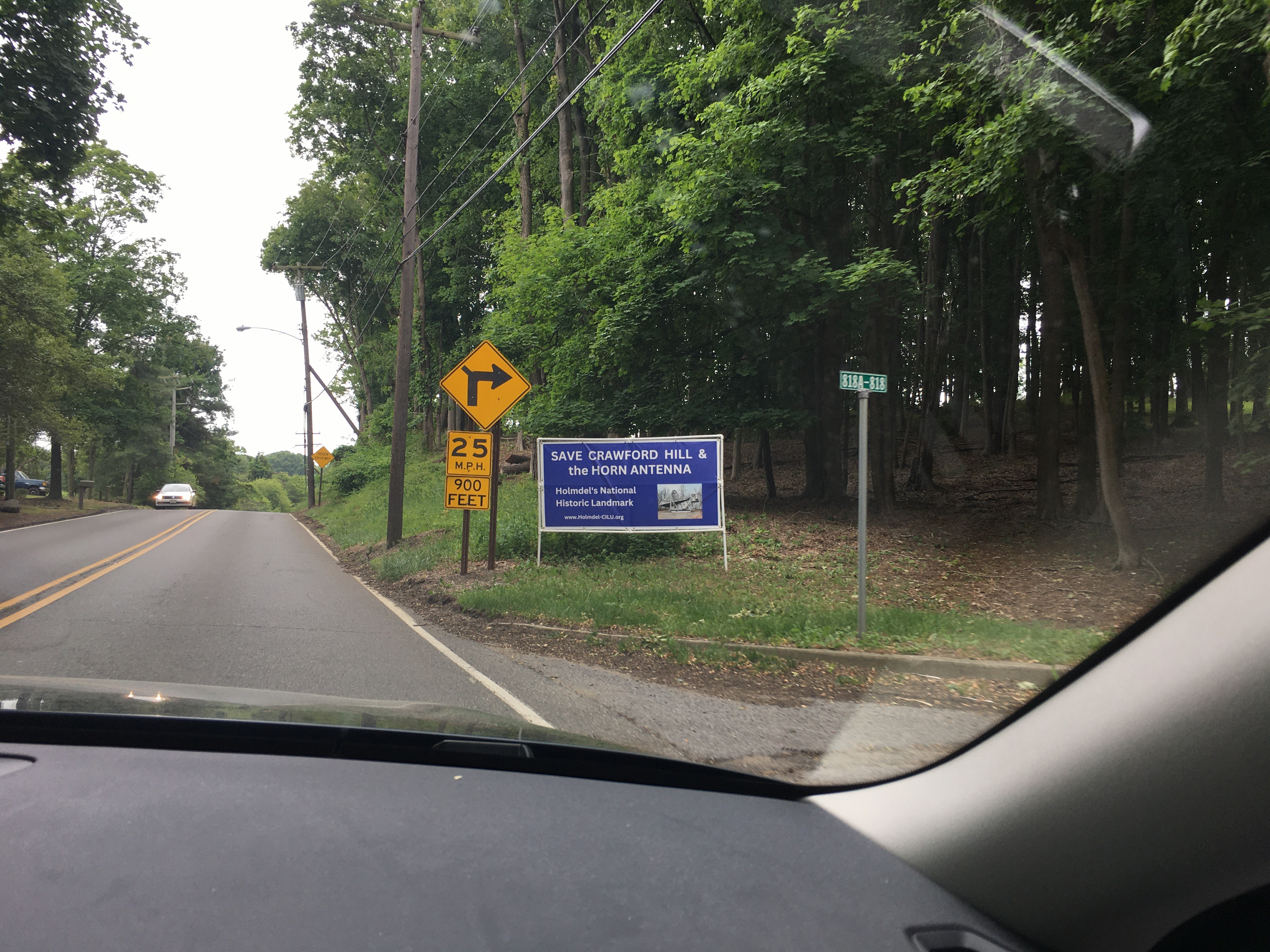
Sign put up on Holmdel Road, urging that the Horn Antenna and its surrounding area be saved

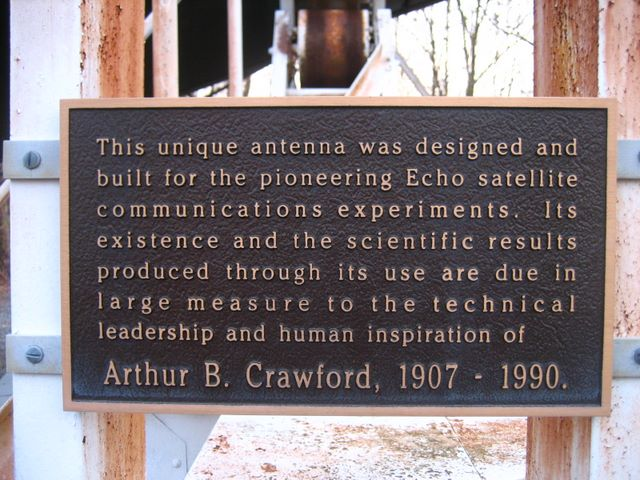
On-site plaque commemorating the work of Arthur B. Crawford

In 2021, the Crawford Hill site was sold to a developer who was interested in constructing a residential development. This triggered a petition to preserve the property as a park, which preservationists preferred over real estate development. The petition was given to township officials in March 2023, having accumulated over 6,900 signatures. That April, township officials filed a lawsuit in the New Jersey Superior Court to clarify who owned the antenna; the site developer, Crawford Hill Holdings claimed that it owned the antenna and would preserve the property. That June, the town moved to acquire the antenna.

In October 2023, the township announced plans to buy and preserve the antenna. The purchase included $5.5 million for 35 acres (14 ha) of land, which would be converted into a public park. The purchase was finalized in January 2024, when the township announced plans for the park. In May 2025, the Institute of Electrical and Electronics Engineers dedicated a plaque commemorating the antenna.

In 1992 the receiver and calibration equipment were sent to the Deutsches Museum in Munich, the birth city of Penzias, while the antenna remains in Holmdel, New Jersey. The museum also displays the hardware alongside a functional 1:25 scale model of the horn antenna.

== See also ==
- Andover Earth Station, location of another large Hogg horn antenna
- National Register of Historic Places listings in Monmouth County, New Jersey
- List of National Historic Landmarks in New Jersey

== Footnotes ==
- Learner, Richard (1981). Astronomy Through the Telescope. New York: Van Nostrand Reinhold Company. p. 154. ISBN 978-0-442-25839-9.
- Aaronson, Steve. "The Light of Creation: An Interview with Arno A. Penzias and Robert W. Wilson." Bell Laboratories Record. January 1979, pp. 12–18.
- Abell, George O. Exploration of the Universe. 4th ed., Philadelphia: Saunders College Publishing, 1982.
- Asimov, Isaac. Asimov's Biographical Encyclopedia of Science and Technology. 2nd ed., New York: Doubleday & Company, Inc., 1982.
- Bernstein, Jeremy. Three Degrees Above Zero: Bell Labs in the Information Age. New York: Charles Scribner's Sons, 1984.
- Chown, Marcus. "A Cosmic Relic in Three Degrees," New Scientist, September 29, 1988, pp. 51–55.
- Crawford, A.B., D.C. Hogg and L.E. Hunt. "Project Echo: A Horn-Reflector Antenna for Space Communication," The Bell System Technical Journal, July 1961, pp. 1095–1099.
- Disney, Michael. The Hidden Universe. New York: Macmillan Publishing Company, 1984.
- Ferris, Timothy. The Red Limit: The Search for the Edge of the Universe. 2nd ed., New York: Quill Press, 1978.
- Friedman, Herbert. The Amazing Universe. Washington, DC: National Geographic Society, 1975.
- Hey, J.S. The Evolution of Radio Astronomy. New York: Neale Watson Academic Publications, Inc., 1973.
- Jastrow, Robert. God and the Astronomers. New York : W. W. Norton & Company, Inc., 1978.
- H.T. Kirby-Smith U.S. Observatories: A Directory and Travel Guide. New York: Van Nostrand Reinhold Company, 1976.
- Penzias, A.A., and R. W. Wilson. "A Measurement of the Flux Density of CAS A At 4080 Mc/s," Astrophysical Journal Letters, May 1965, pp. 1149–1154.
