= David Todd Wilkinson =

American cosmologist (1935–2002)

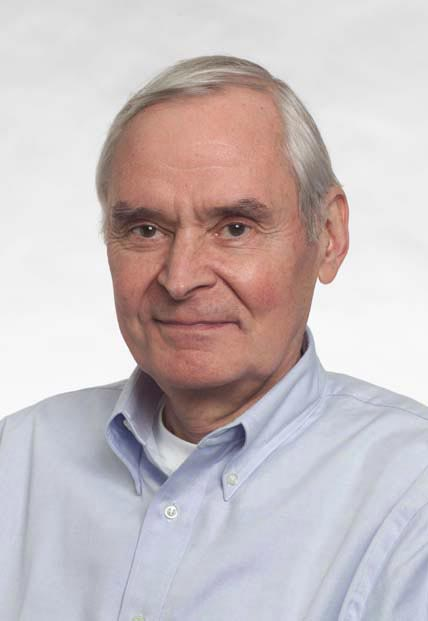
- Born: 13 May 1935
- Died: 5 September 2002 (aged 67)
- Education: University of Michigan
- Awards: James Craig Watson Medal (2001)
- Scientific career
- Fields: cosmology
- Workplaces: Princeton University
- Doctoral advisor: H. Richard Crane
- Doctoral students: Marc Davis; Suzanne Staggs; Peter Saulson

David Todd Wilkinson (May 13, 1935 – September 5, 2002) was an American cosmologist, specializing in the study of the cosmic microwave background radiation (CMB).

== Education ==
Wilkinson was born in Hillsdale, Michigan on May 13, 1935, and earned his Ph.D. in physics at the University of Michigan under the supervision of H. Richard Crane.

== Research and career ==
Wilkinson was a Professor of Physics at Princeton University from 1965 until his retirement in 2002. He made fundamental contributions to many major cosmic microwave background experiments, including two NASA satellites: the Cosmic Background Explorer (COBE) and the Wilkinson Microwave Anisotropy Probe (WMAP), the latter of which was named in his honor after his death due to cancer on September 5, 2002.

== Accolades ==
- Princeton President's Award for Distinguished Teaching
- Election to the National Academy of Sciences (1983)
- James Craig Watson Medal (2001)
