= Arno Allan Penzias =

American physicist (1933–2024)

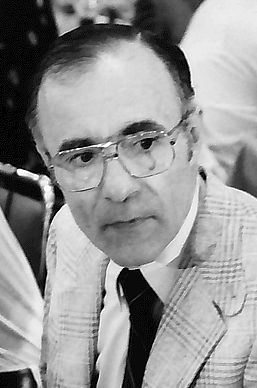
- Penzias in 1982
- Born: April 26, 1933; Munich, Bavaria, Germany
- Died: January 22, 2024 (aged 90); San Francisco, California, US
- Citizenship: United States (from 1946)
- Education: City College of New York (BS); Columbia University (MA, PhD)
- Known for: Cosmic microwave background radiation
- Spouses: Anne Barras (m. 1954, divorced) Sherry Levit (m. 1996)
- Children: 5
- Awards: Henry Draper Medal (1977); Nobel Prize in Physics (1978); Harold Pender Award (1991); IRI Medal (1998)
- Scientific career
- Fields: Physics
- Workplaces: Bell Labs; Columbia University
- Thesis: A tunable maser radiometer and the measurement of 21 cm line emission from free hydrogen in the Pegasus I cluster of galaxies (1962)
- Doctoral advisor: Charles H. Townes
- Doctoral students: Pierre Encrenaz

Arno Allan Penzias (/ˈpɛnziəs/; April 26, 1933 – January 22, 2024) was an American physicist and radio astronomer. He shared the 1978 Nobel Prize in Physics with Robert Woodrow Wilson "for their discovery of cosmic microwave background radiation".

== Early life, family and education ==
Penzias was born in Munich, Germany, the son of Justine (née Eisenreich) and Karl Penzias, who ran a leather business. His grandparents had come to Munich from Poland and were among the leaders of the Reichenbachstrasse synagogue. At age six, he and his brother Gunther were among the Jewish children evacuated to Britain as part of the Kindertransport rescue operation. Later, his parents also fled Nazi Germany, first for the UK, and then for the US, and the family settled in the Bronx, New York City, New York, in 1940. In 1946, Penzias became a US citizen.

After he graduated from Brooklyn Technical High School in 1951, he enrolled at the City College of New York to study chemistry, but he changed majors to physics and graduated in 1954, ranked near the top of his class. Penzias thereafter served in the U.S. Army Signal Corps as a radar officer for two years.

== Career ==
Penzias' involvement with radar in the Signal Corps led to a research assistantship in the Columbia University Radiation Laboratory, which was then heavily involved in microwave physics. Penzias worked under Charles H. Townes, who later invented the maser. Penzias enrolled as a graduate student at Columbia University in 1956, where he earned a master's degree and a PhD in physics, the latter in 1962.

Thereafter, at Bell Labs in Holmdel Township, New Jersey, he and Robert Woodrow Wilson worked on ultra-sensitive cryogenic microwave receivers, intended for radio astronomy observations. In 1964, on building their most sensitive antenna/receiver system, the pair encountered radio noise that they could not explain. It was far less energetic than the radiation given off by the Milky Way, and it was isotropic, so they assumed their instrument was subject to interference by terrestrial sources. They tried, and then rejected, the hypothesis that the radio noise emanated from New York City. An examination of the microwave horn antenna showed it was full of bat and pigeon droppings, which Penzias described as "white dielectric material". After the pair removed the dung buildup the noise remained. Having rejected all sources of interference, Penzias contacted Robert H. Dicke, who suggested it might be the background radiation predicted by some cosmological theories. The pair agreed with Dicke to publish side-by-side letters in the Astrophysical Journal, with Penzias and Wilson describing their observations and Dicke suggesting the interpretation as the cosmic microwave background (CMB), the radio remnant of the Big Bang. This proved to be landmark evidence for the Big Bang and provided substantial confirmation for predictions made by Ralph Asher Alpher, Robert Herman and George Gamow in the 1940s and 1950s.

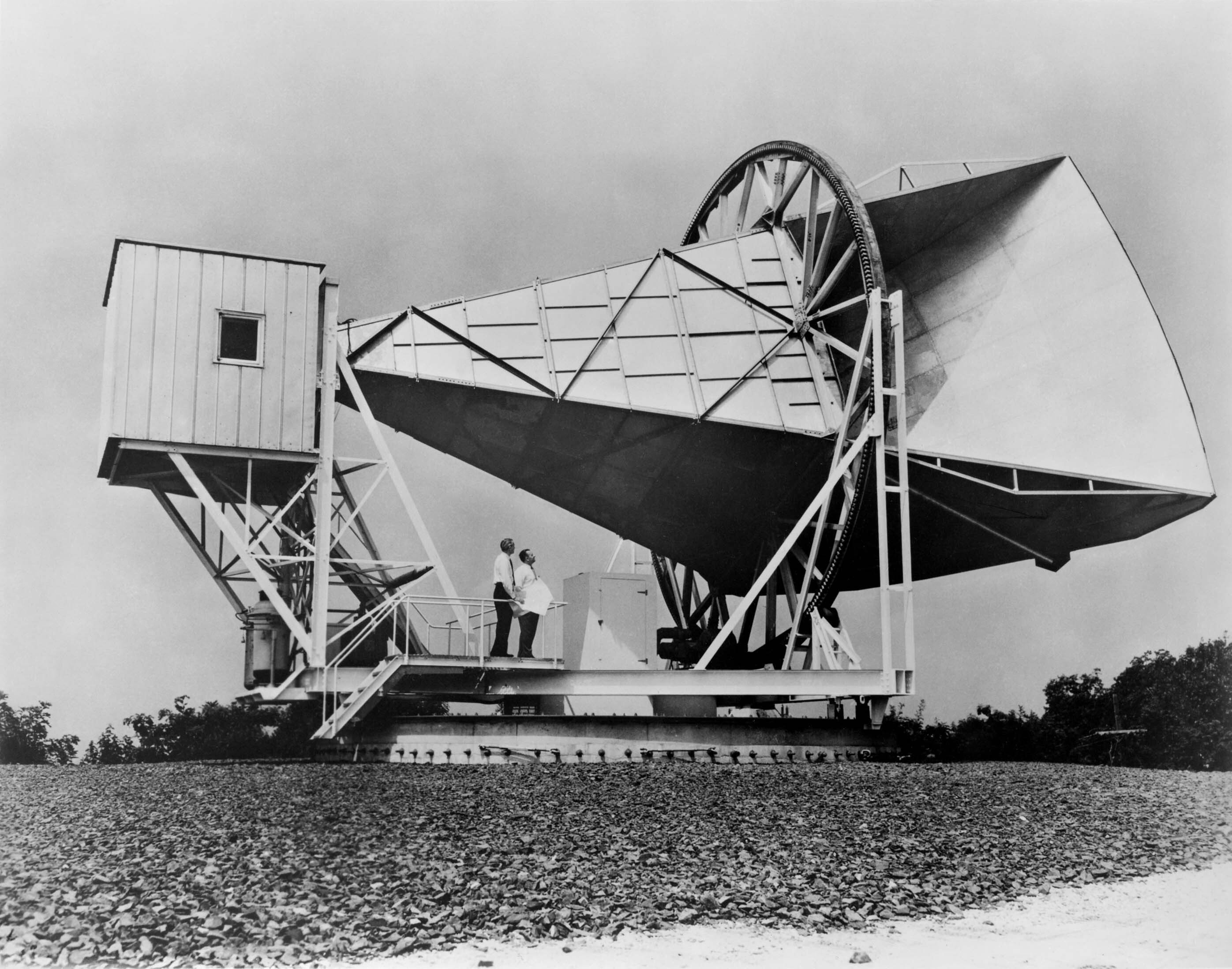
Penzias and Wilson, standing under the 15 m (49 ft 3 in) Holmdel Horn Antenna in New Jersey that brought their most notable discovery

== Honors and awards ==
Penzias was elected a Fellow of the American Academy of Arts and Sciences and the National Academy of Sciences in 1975. In 1977, Penzias and Wilson received the Henry Draper Medal of the National Academy of Sciences. The two were awarded the 1978 Nobel Prize in Physics for their discovery of cosmic microwave background radiation, sharing it with Pyotr Kapitsa. Kapitsa's work on low-temperature physics was unrelated to Penzias's and Wilson's. In 1979, Penzias received the Golden Plate Award of the American Academy of Achievement. He was also the recipient of The International Center in New York's Award of Excellence. In 1998, he was awarded the IRI Medal from the Industrial Research Institute.

On April 26, 2019, the Nürnberger Astronomische Gesellschaft e.V. (NAG) inaugurated the 3 m (10 ft) radio telescope at the Regiomontanus-Sternwarte, the public observatory of Nuremberg, and dedicated this instrument to Arno Penzias.

On September 11, 2023, the Radio Club of America said announced it had named an award, the Dr. Arno A. Penzias Award for Contributions to Basic Research in the Radio Sciences, to recognize his significant contributions to basic research involving radio frequency and related subjects. The club also announced that the first recipient of the award would be named in 2024.

== Personal life ==
In 1954, Penzias married Anne Barras; the couple had three children, David, Mindy, and Laurie, before they divorced. Penzias was a resident of Highland Park, New Jersey, in the 1990s.

In 1996, he married Silicon Valley executive Sherry Levit, becoming stepfather to her son Carson and daughter Victoria.

Penzias died from complications of Alzheimer's disease at an assisted living facility in San Francisco, on January 22, 2024, at age 90.

== Works ==
- Wilson, R. W.; Penzias, A. A. (1967). "Isotropy of Cosmic Background Radiation at 4080 Megahertz". Science. 156 (3778): 1100–1101. Bibcode:1967Sci...156.1100W. doi:10.1126/science.156.3778.1100. PMID 17774056. S2CID 46069151.
- Penzias, A. A.; Wilson, R. W. (1970). "Microwave Noise from Rainstorms". Science. 169 (3945): 583–584. Bibcode:1970Sci...169..583P. doi:10.1126/science.169.3945.583. PMID 17746031. S2CID 7066298.
- Penzias, Arno A. (1979). "The Origin of the Elements". Science. 205 (4406): 549–554. Bibcode:1979Sci...205..549P. doi:10.1126/science.205.4406.549. PMID 17729659.
- Penzias, Arno A. (1980). "Nuclear Processing and Isotopes in the Galaxy". Science. 208 (4445): 663–669. Bibcode:1980Sci...208..663P. doi:10.1126/science.208.4445.663. PMID 17771085. S2CID 22381508.

== See also ==
- Discovery of cosmic microwave background radiation
- List of Jewish Nobel laureates
