= Robert Woodrow Wilson =

American astronomer (born 1936)

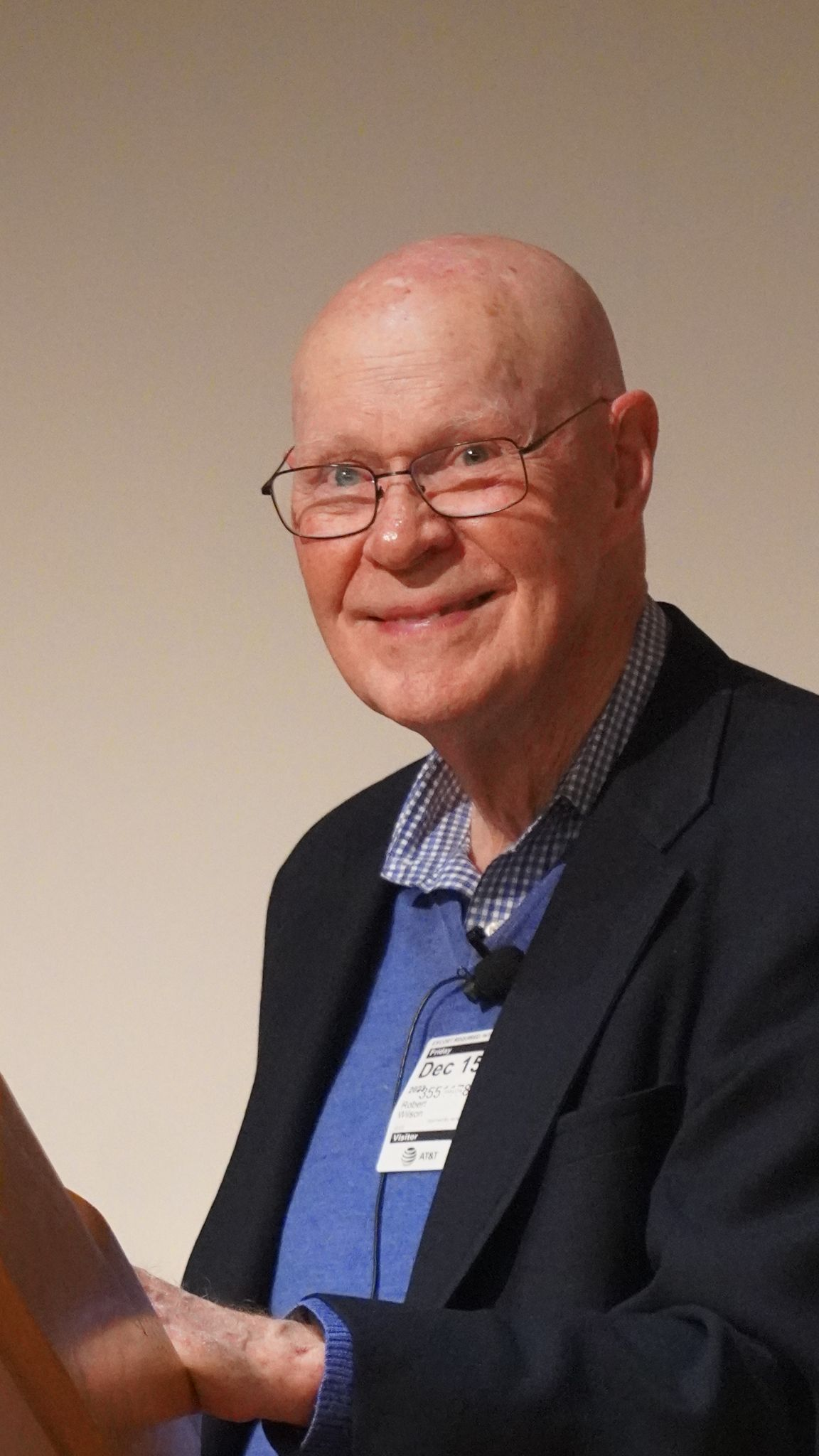
- Wilson in 2023
- Born: January 10, 1936 (age 90); Houston, Texas, U.S.
- Education: Rice University; California Institute of Technology
- Known for: Cosmic microwave background radiation
- Spouse: Elizabeth Rhoads Sawin (m. 1958)
- Awards: Henry Draper Medal (1977); Nobel Prize in Physics (1978)
- Scientific career
- Fields: Physics
- Workplaces: Bell Laboratories; Harvard-Smithsonian Center for Astrophysics

Robert Woodrow Wilson (born January 11, 1936) is an American astronomer who shared the 1978 Nobel Prize in Physics with Arno Penzias "for their discovery of cosmic microwave background radiation".

While doing tests and experiments with the Holmdel Horn Antenna at Bell Labs in Holmdel Township, New Jersey, Wilson and Penzias discovered a source of noise in the atmosphere that they could not explain. After removing all potential sources of noise, including pigeon droppings on the antenna, the noise was finally identified as CMB, which served as important corroboration of the Big Bang theory.

In 1970, Wilson led a team that made the first detection of a rotational spectral line of carbon monoxide (CO) in an astronomical object, the Orion Nebula, and eight other galactic sources. Subsequently, CO observations became the standard method of tracing cool molecular interstellar gas, and detection of CO was the foundational event for the fields of millimeter and submillimeter astronomy.

== Life and work ==
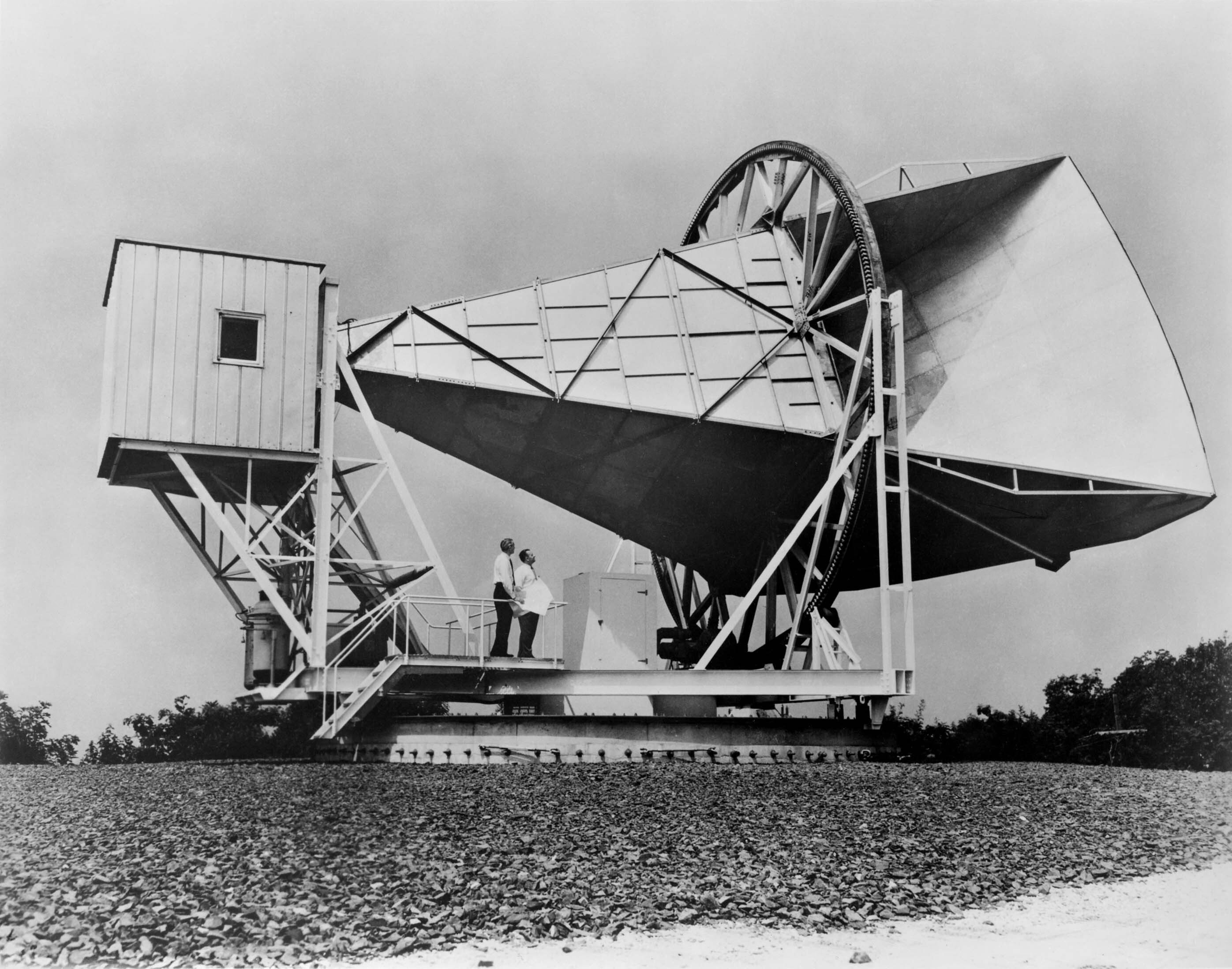
Penzias and Wilson stand at the 15 meter Holmdel Horn Antenna that brought their most notable discovery

Robert Woodrow Wilson was born on January 10, 1936, in Houston, Texas. He graduated from Lamar High School in River Oaks, in Houston, and studied as an undergraduate at Rice University, also in Houston, where he was inducted into the Phi Beta Kappa society. He then earned a PhD in physics at California Institute of Technology. His thesis advisors at Caltech included John Bolton and Maarten Schmidt.

Wilson and Penzias also won the Henry Draper Medal of the National Academy of Sciences in 1977. Wilson received the Golden Plate Award of the American Academy of Achievement in 1987.

Wilson remained at Bell Laboratories until 1994, when he was named a senior scientist at the Harvard-Smithsonian Center for Astrophysics in Cambridge, Massachusetts.

Wilson has been a resident of Holmdel Township, New Jersey.

Wilson married Elizabeth Rhoads Sawin in 1958.

Wilson is one of the 20 American recipients of the Nobel Prize in Physics to sign a letter addressed to President George W. Bush in May 2008, urging him to "reverse the damage done to basic science research in the Fiscal Year 2008 Omnibus Appropriations Bill" by requesting additional emergency funding for the Department of Energy's Office of Science, the National Science Foundation, and the National Institute of Standards and Technology.

Wilson was elected to the American Philosophical Society in 2009.
