= Bell Labs Holmdel Complex =

Mixed-use commercial complex in Holmdel, New Jersey

- The main building as seen in 2025
- Interactive map of the complex

General information
- Type: Mixed-use development
- Architectural style: Mid-century modern
- Location: 101 Crawfords Corner Road, Holmdel, New Jersey, U.S.
- Coordinates: 40.3651°N 74.1675°W
- Year built: 1959–1962
- Renovated: 1965–1966, 1980–1983, 2013
- Cost: $20 million ($163 million in 2025)
- Renovation cost: $273 million (2013)
- Owner: Somerset Development (d.b.a. Bell Works)

Dimensions
- Other dimensions: 1,000 by 360 feet (300 m × 110 m)

Technical details
- Floor count: 6
- Floor area: 2,000,000 square feet (190,000 m^{2})
- Grounds: 472.69 acres (1.9129 km^{2})

Design and construction
- Architect: Eero Saarinen and Associates
- Developer: Bell Telephone Laboratories, Inc.
- Engineer: Western Electric
- Structural engineer: Severud Associates
- Services engineer: Jaros, Baum & Bolles
- Other designers: Sasaki, Walker and Associates; Bolt, Beranek and Newman, Inc.
- Main contractor: Frank Briscoe Construction Co.

Website
- bell.works/new-jersey/
- Bell Laboratories-Holmdel
- U.S. National Register of Historic Places
- New Jersey Register of Historic Places
- NRHP reference No.: 16000223
- NJRHP No.: 4771

Significant dates
- Added to NRHP: June 26, 2017
- Designated NJRHP: March 8, 2016

The Bell Labs Holmdel Complex (later known as Bell Works) is a development in Holmdel Township, Monmouth County, New Jersey, United States. It functioned as a research and development facility for the Bell System and later Bell Labs between 1962 and 2007. The centerpiece of the campus, a modernist structure designed by Eero Saarinen, was dubbed "the biggest mirror ever" for its mirrored exterior. Roche-Dinkeloo, the successor firm to Saarinen's architectural practice, designed two expansions to the original structure.

The complex, landscaped by Sasaki Associates, includes a series of plantings and one-way roads. A pair of elliptical roads surrounds the core of the complex, which is divided into parking lots and lakes surrounding the main building. The structure itself contains about 2 million square feet (190,000 m^{2}), spread across six stories. The building has a rectangular massing, with a concrete pedestal and a facade made of black anodized aluminum and reflective glass. Each elevation of the facade has an entrance. The first story is partially below ground level due to the site's slope. Internally, the original building is divided into four pavilions (formerly containing labs and offices), connected by passageways on the building's perimeter. The pavilions surround a large cross-shaped atrium running along the building's major axes.

Bell Labs had owned the site since 1929, conducting experiments and technological research there. Saarinen was commissioned in April 1957 to study the site; he was hired in 1959 to design the building, and the first two pavilions were fully operational by September 1962. To accommodate the company's growing needs, two additional pavilions were constructed between May 1964 and September 1966. The building was expanded again in 1982 to its final size. Restructuring of the company's research efforts reduced the use of the Holmdel Complex, and in 2006 the building was put up for sale. The building has undergone renovations into a multi-purpose living and working space dubbed Bell Works. Since 2013 it has been operated by Somerset Development, which redeveloped the building as Bell Works, a mixed-use development for high-tech startup companies.

The complex is listed on the National Register of Historic Places and has been the subject of several awards. A number of films, television series, and commercials have been filmed in and around Bell Works, including Severance, The Crowded Room, and Law & Order: Organized Crime.

== Site ==
The Bell Labs Holmdel Complex is located within Holmdel Township, New Jersey, United States. Situated in Monmouth County south of New York City, the site covers about 472 acres (191 ha). (Note: An article in The Keyport Weekly gives an area of 456 acres (185 ha). The National Park Service and The Jersey Journal cite a different area of 460 acres (190 ha), while other newspapers cite an area of 473 acres (191 ha).) Prior to the complex's construction, the site was mostly flat. The core portion of the site, covering 134 acres (54 ha), was landscaped by Sasaki Associates. The section designed by Sasaki, which is part of the complex's National Register of Historic Places listing, resembles a keyhole as seen from the air. The rest of the site was originally a nature preserve, with trees and fields predating Bell Labs' construction. It was redeveloped in the 2010s with about 225 houses built by Toll Brothers.

=== Circulation and layout ===
==== Roads ====
Slip ramps connect the outer and inner elliptical roads, creating a series of grassy median islands around the complex.

The complex is accessed primarily by car and has 8.1 miles (13.0 km) of one-way roads. The use of one-way streets eliminated the need for wide arterial roads and segregated traffic based on their destination. The site is reached by a pair of access roads running between Crawfords Corner Road in the northeast and the complex's main building in the southwest. The access roads flank a median strip shaped like two connected triangles; they taper to 50 yards (46 m) apart near the northeastern end of the site, but diverge from each other to both the northeast and southwest.

The access roads lead to two concentric elliptical roads running around the main building. The outer ellipse is 850 by 540 yards (780 m × 490 m) across, while the inner ellipse is 950 by 670 yards (870 m × 610 m) across. The roads' outer perimeter is lined with trees planted by Sasaki, while the inner perimeter has trees and grassy strips, separating them from the parking lots inside the ellipse. The two elliptical driveways provide access to ancillary buildings on the site, such as the loading docks and boiler room. They are connected by one-way slip ramps, dividing the ellipses into median islands.

One of the median islands contains a monument to Karl Guthe Jansky, who developed the world's first radio telescope at that location in 1931. The Jansky monument is a reproduction of the original telescope, variously cited as 11 feet (3.3 m) or 13 feet (4.0 m) long. Since the only extant data from the original telescope was collected on September 10, 1932, the Jansky monument is oriented in the same direction the original telescope faced on that date.

==== Elliptical area ====
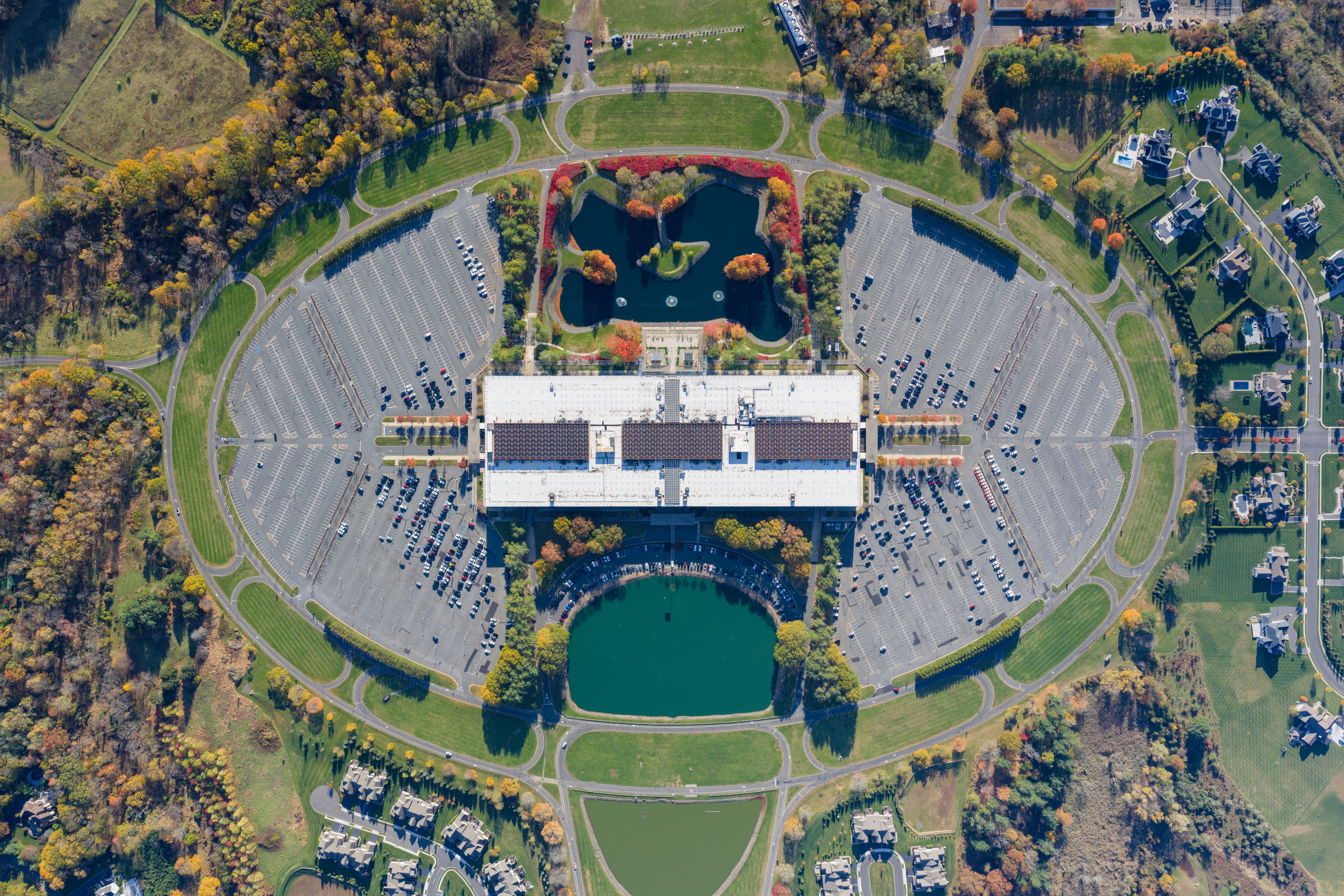
The main building and artificial lakes sit within the center of the ellipse, with parking lots filling the parabola-shaped ends.

The area within the inner ellipse is divided into three sections. The central section, between the northwest–southeast access roads, contains the main building. There are two artificial lakes within the center section, one each to the northeast and southwest of the main building. The reflecting pool to the north, a 6-acre (2.4 ha) oval, measures 190 by 140 yards (170 m × 130 m) and has some parking lots next to it. The pool could store 6 million US gallons (23,000,000 L; 5,000,000 imp gal), and it provides cooled water for the building's air-conditioning system and for fire protection. Underneath the main building, the land descends from north to south. The lagoon to the south, dating from 1982, is symmetrical and has trees, an island, and a footbridge. There were originally two additional ponds, one flanking the building on either side. The ponds, which predated the building's construction, were re-landscaped in the 1960s and then infilled when the building was extended in the 1980s.

The parabola-shaped northwestern and southeastern sections of the ellipse, flanking the main building, contain parking lots. The parking spaces accommodate about 5,000 vehicles. (Note: The Asbury Park Press cites a more precise figure of 4,890 parking spots.) Within each parking lot, a driveway with grassy median islands, flanked by trees and sidewalks, leads to entrances on the northwest and southeast elevations of the building's facade. When the complex opened in 1962, the site had nearly 8,000 trees and plants.

=== Water tower ===
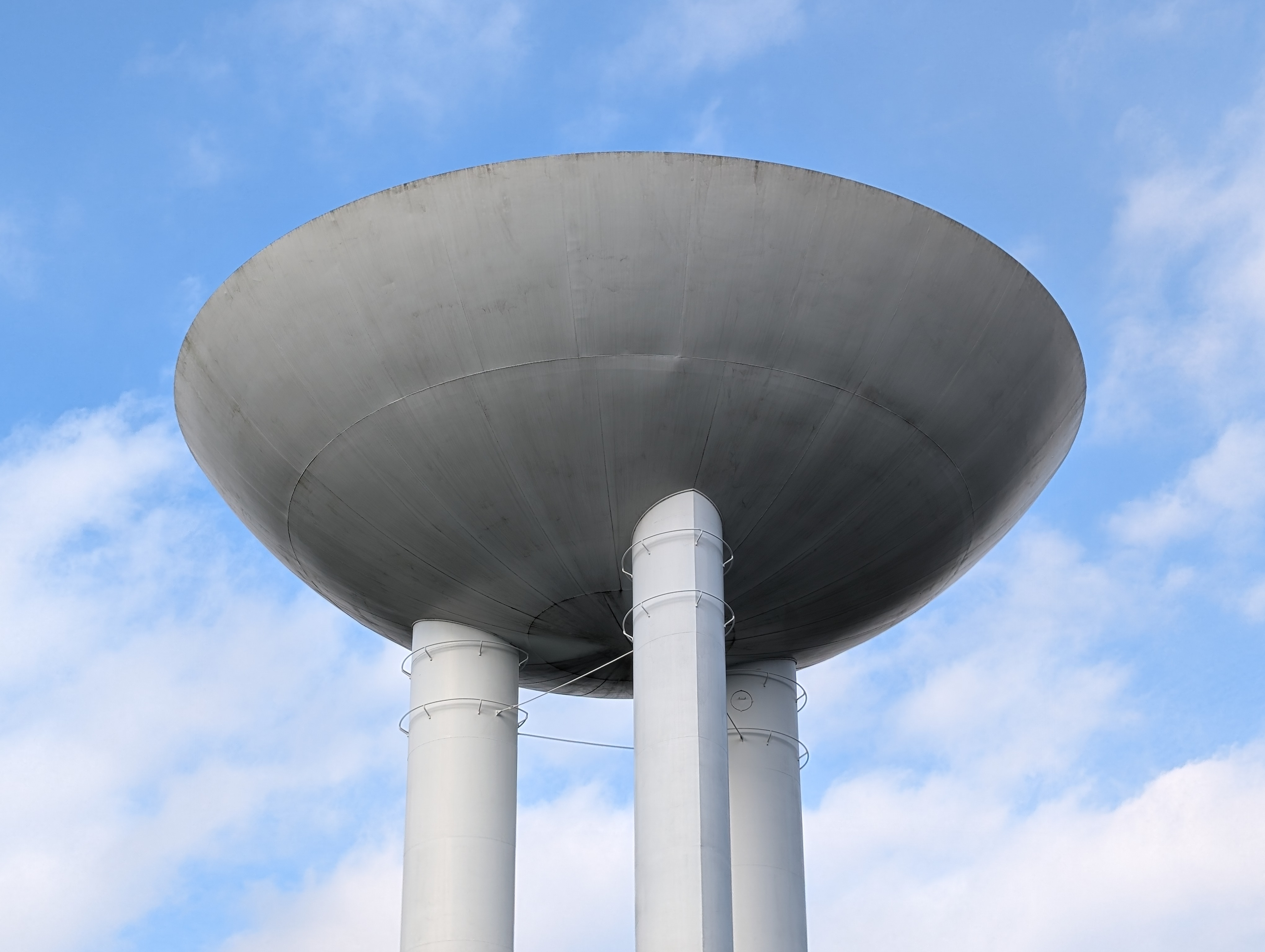
Saarinen said that the site's water tower should not be hidden away, and could be "a proud and beautiful vertical accent, like a piece of sculpture."

The water tower on the complex is located within the median between the two access roads. Measuring 127 feet (39 m) high, the water tower can store up to 300,000 US gallons (1,100,000 L) and was built to allow the building's laboratories to maintain a consistent water pressure. Three wells provide water to the tower.

The water tower has three white legs, which support a bowl measuring 72 feet (22 m) wide and illuminated from the base. The Asbury Park Press described the design as resembling a transistor; despite the lack of any documented historical evidence, an urban legend claims that the tower's legs represent the pieces of a transistor. Upon its construction in 1961, a writer for the Asbury Park Press said that the water tower gave the complex a vertical accent, similar to the water tower in the General Motors Technical Center, designed by Bell Labs Holmdel's architect Eero Saarinen. The tower was still in usable condition more than 40 years after its construction.

== Architecture ==
The Bell Works building was designed for Bell Labs by Eero Saarinen, with Anthony J. Lumsden as the project architect. Saarinen designed the first part of the building in 1959–1962 under Eero Saarinen and Associates; the original building was Saarinen's only design in New Jersey. Roche-Dinkeloo, a successor firm to Saarinen's practice founded by his former associates Kevin Roche and John Dinkeloo designed two annexes in the mid-1960s and the 1980s. The project also involved structural engineers Severud-Elstad-Krueger Associates, mechanical engineers Jaros, Baum & Bolles, and acoustical consultants Bolt, Beranek & Newman; the first two firms were also involved in the mid-1960s expansion.

The Bell Works building contains about 2 million square feet (190,000 m^{2}), spread across six stories. Due to the site's slope, the front (or northeastern) elevation of the facade is five stories high, (Note: In its report about Bell Labs Holmdel, the National Park Service uses modified cardinal directions, which are rotated 45 degrees clockwise from the original directions (for example, the northeastern elevation is described as facing "north"). In this article, the precise cardinal directions are used.) since the first story is partially below ground. The front elevation rises to a height of 70 feet (21 m). (Note: Another source gives a height of 74 feet (23 m).) The building is centered around a cruciform atrium and measures 1,000 by 360 feet (300 m × 110 m) across, including expansions. The atrium occupies slightly over half the building's interior area; excluding the atrium, Bell Works has 923,500 square feet (85,800 m^{2}) of usable space. Because of the weak soil underneath, the structure is underpinned by thousands of deep foundations.

=== Exterior ===
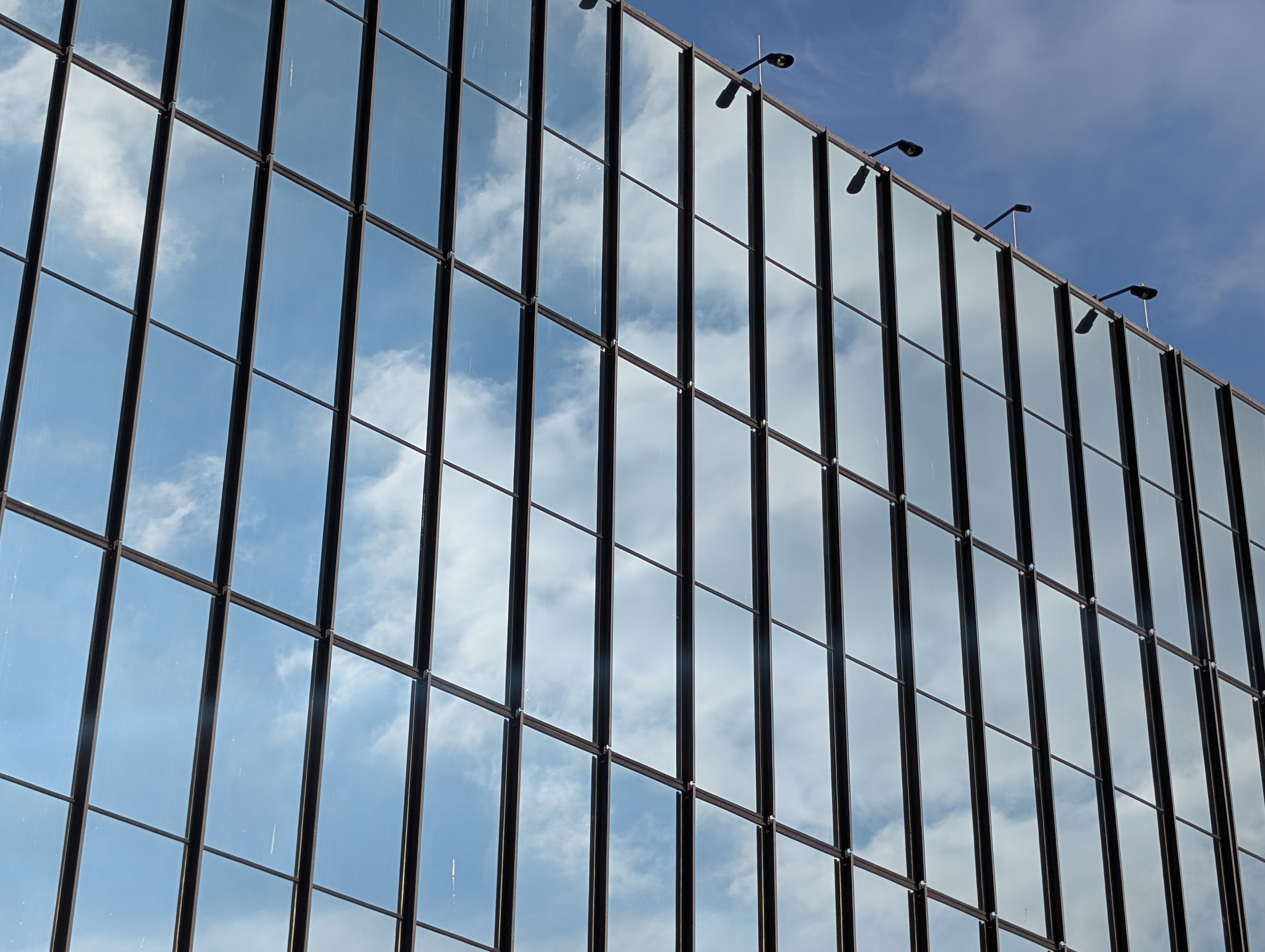
The building's reflective glass, divided by protruding mullions made of black anodized aluminum, was called the "biggest mirror ever" by Architectural Forum.

The building has a rectangular massing, or general shape. All four elevations are similar in design, with facades made of black anodized aluminum and glass. The windows are interspersed with protruding aluminum mullions of differing thickness, which divide the facade horizontally into tiers and vertically into bays. The anodized aluminum, manufactured by Kaiser Aluminum, was used because it was easy to maintain and was inexpensive.

Each glass panel on the facade measures 3 feet (0.91 m) across and 6.5 feet (2.0 m) tall. Saarinen's original plans called for mirrored glass to be used on all four elevations, but material shortages meant that only part of the rear, or southwestern, elevation could be clad in the material. The mirrored glass panels reflected most sunlight, saving energy, (Note: Sources disagree on whether they reflect 65%, 70%, or 75% of sunlight. One source cited the facade as deflecting 70% of solar heat, while another gave a figure of "70 to 80 percent" of deflected solar heat.) and they also provided privacy and had a distinctive design. The panels consist of two layers of glass separated by a layer of aluminum particles, which reflect sunlight; (Note: The Architectural Forum of 1967 wrote that a "combination of aluminum and chromium" was used.) the outer layer is tinged with purple because it has an embedded layer of chromium. The remainder of the rear wall and the entirety of the other walls originally used tinted glass. The other elevations were refitted with mirrored glass later in the 1960s, when that material became more widely available. The windows cover a total area of 200,000 square feet (19,000 m^{2}).

The building rests on a concrete pedestal, which is shaped like an elongated octagon. All four elevations are recessed from the pedestal, which contains concrete ventilation openings. Three rectangular skylights run above the roof from northwest to southeast and are visible from the ground level. There are also two concrete penthouses between these skylights; two smaller skylights running above the northeast and southeast entrances; and other pieces of mechanical equipment scattered across the roof. As part of a 2010s renovation, the skylights were replaced with photovoltaic glass.

==== Entrances ====
A concrete canopy stands above a flight of slate steps ascending to the southeastern entrance; the northwest entrance has a similar design.

The center of each elevation features an entrance of a different size and design, and the doors are designed to open to draw fresh air into the building during fires. In addition to the front entrance, there is a first-floor entrance on the rear elevation and second-floor entrances on either of the side elevations (facing northwest and southeast). At the front entrance, the concrete pedestal is partially visible, and a set of slate steps and an asymmetrical wheelchair ramp ascends to a central portico atop the pedestal. The portico has a slate floor and a freestanding concrete canopy. Under the concrete canopy is a smaller painted-metal canopy, which is attached to the facade, above a symmetrical array of aluminum double doors and revolving doors. At the extreme ends of the front elevation are driveway ramps, built as part of the original building; the 1980s annexes are built over these driveways, which still exist.

On the southwestern elevation, a portion of the cafeteria protrudes from the center of the pedestal. The cafeteria has aluminum-framed glazed windows on three sides and a roof that was originally covered in ballast. There are entrance vestibules at two corners of the cafeteria; each vestibule has a set of three doors outside and another set of double doors inside. Flanking the cafeteria are stairs that ascend to another entrance on the second floor. The rest of the rear elevation's first story has a windowless concrete base. At either end are vehicular ramps, which are continuations of the ramps from the northeastern elevation.

The side entrances are similar in design and are symmetrical. On the northwestern elevation, a freestanding concrete canopy stands above a flight of slate steps of similar width, which ascends to the entrances. Midway up the stairs is a small open-air courtyard protruding from the facade, surrounded by glazed, metal-framed panels. The outermost portions of the stairway continue all the way up to a pair of entrances, each with an aluminum vestibule and double doors. The southeastern elevation's entrance has a similar design.

=== Interior ===
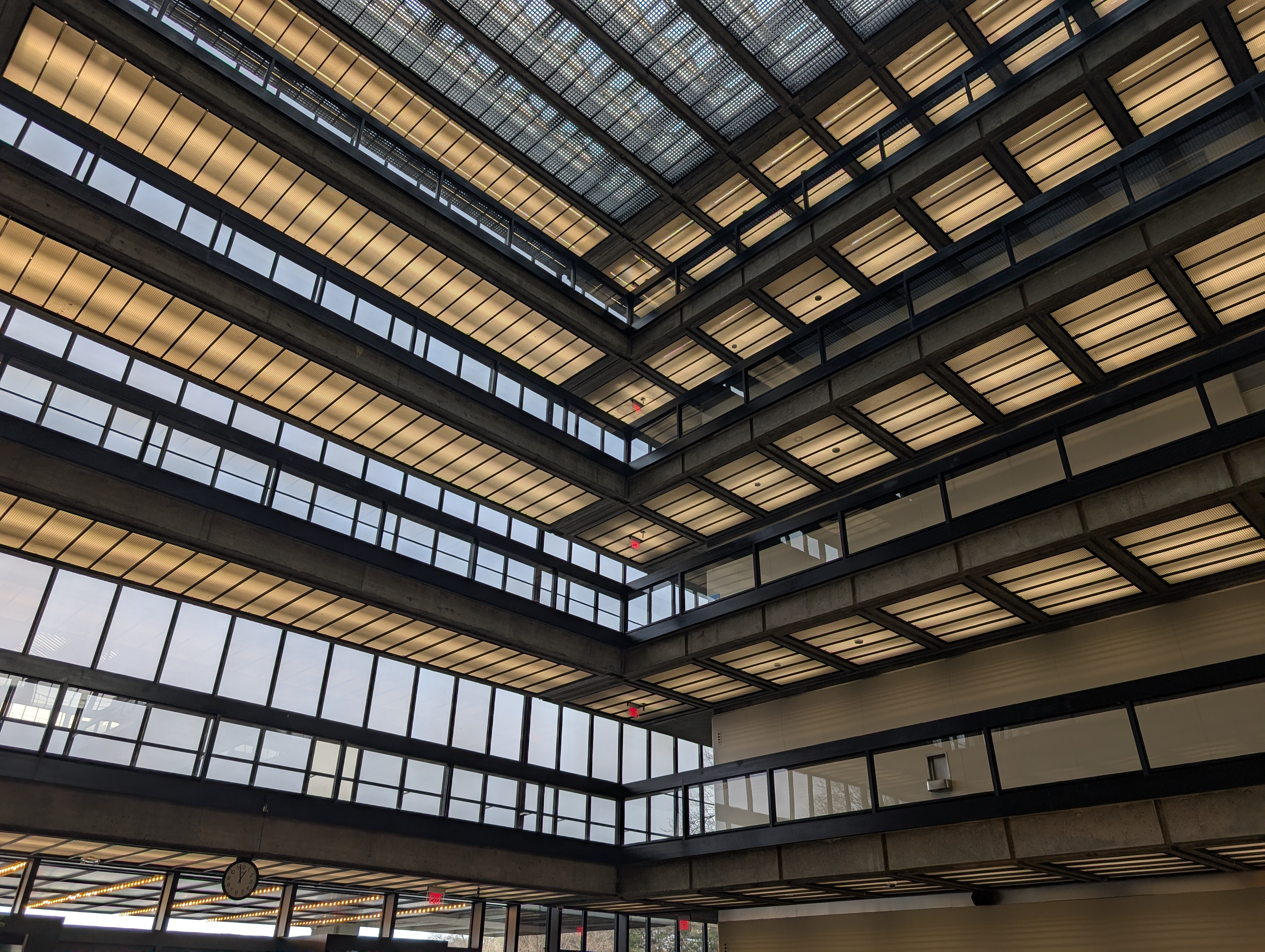
The interior features office pavilions lined with cantilevered walkways. Bridges connect adjacent pavilions along their perimeters, leaving the central void open.

Internally, the building is divided into four pavilions (formerly containing labs and offices) surrounding the atrium. Roche-Dinkeloo's 1980s expansions extended the pavilions northwest and southeast, along the main axis, but retained the basic layout of the pavilions. The interiors use large amounts of poured, reinforced concrete for structural details. Different surface finishes are used in different parts of the building.

The building contains 14 staircases and 17 elevators, of which 12 are for passengers and 5 are for freight. There are two elevator towers, each one serving a pair of pavilions, which are clad in bush-hammered concrete. Each of the towers has four passenger elevators, and the elevator lobbies on each floor have dropped-tile ceilings, tile walls, and vinyl or carpeted walls. The original building and its 1960s expansion include ten terrazzo-and-metal staircases with metal railings, concrete walls, and plaster ceilings. Another granite stair leads between the first and second floors, with metal-and-glass balustrades. Roche-Dinkeloo's 1980s annexes have four passenger elevators (two in each annex), which are housed within curved, glass-walled elevator shafts. The 1980s annexes also have four terrazzo staircases, each with metal railings.

In contrast to contemporary office buildings, which generally had air-conditioning systems at their periphery, the building's air-conditioning system primarily cooled spaces further inside, within the pavilions. For flexibility, office and laboratory spaces had relatively little mechanical equipment. Instead, utility shafts, each measuring 5 feet (1.5 m) wide, were spaced at regular intervals. Fiber-optic cables were built into the structure, unusually for most US buildings at the time. When the building was redeveloped in the 2010s, a new cooling and heating system was installed. The original utility shafts were removed to create open floor plans.

==== First story ====
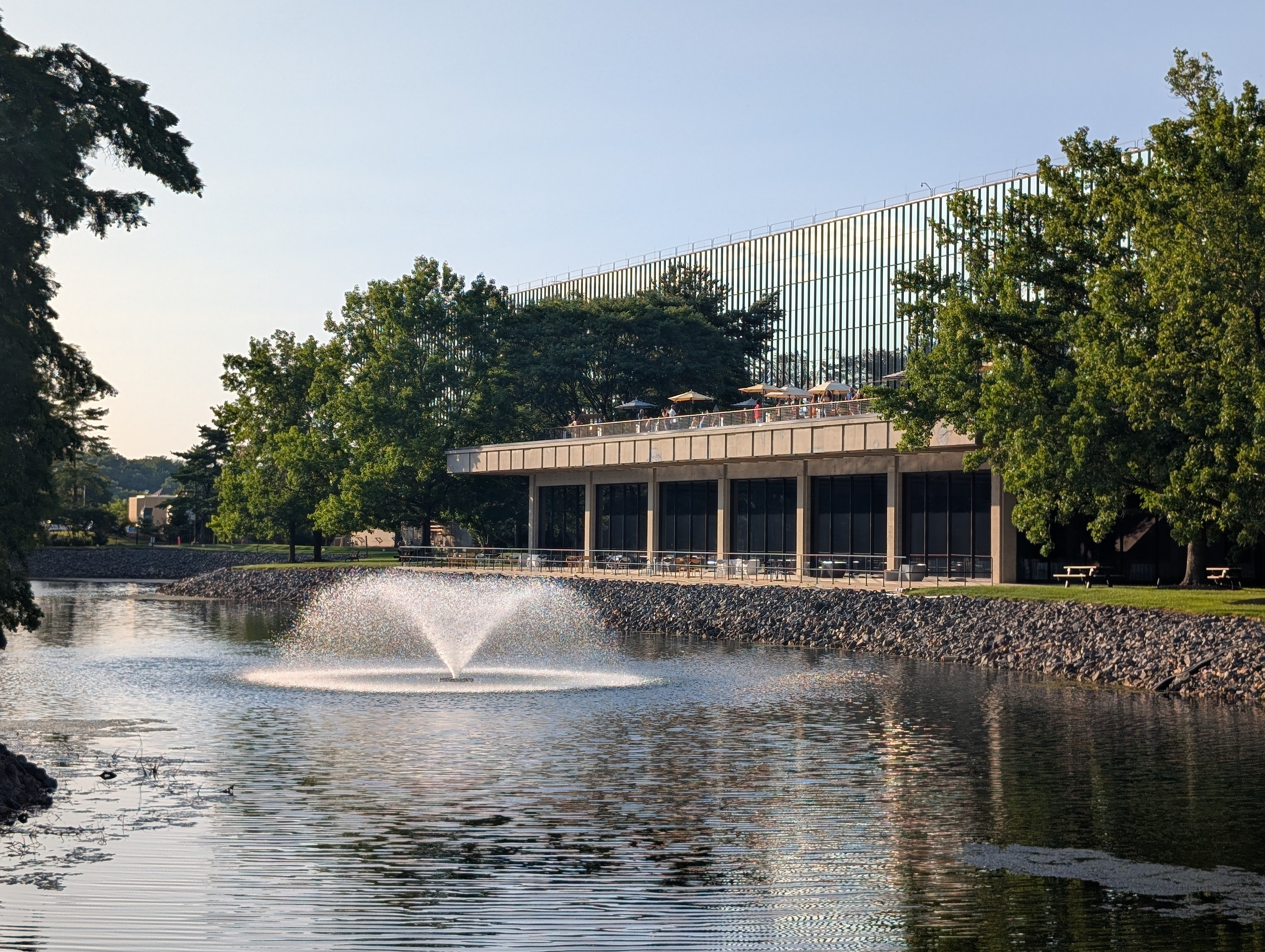
An extension of the building to the southwest sits partially below-grade and below the atrium on the first floor, overlooking an artificial pond.

The first story is below the atrium and is partly below grade. It is accessed from the cafeteria's entrance vestibules and from the driveways at the extreme northwest and southeast ends of the building. As such, the first floor has a different layout from the rest of the building. Originally, this story contained utilitarian spaces such as stockrooms, workshops, and a library. Unlike in the rest of the building, the first floor's main hallway is oriented along the building's secondary northeast–southwest axis. The staircase from the second floor leads to a ground-floor lobby with dropped acoustic tile ceilings and granite walls and floors. A pair of utilitarian corridors, paralleling the building's main axis, extends from the main ground-level hallway. Offices and laboratories extend off these corridors, with dropped ceilings, concrete of gypsum-block walls, and a variety of floor finishes.

The original Bell Labs library on the first floor could accommodate 500 periodicals and 14,000 print works. South of the offices is the auditorium, which has a wooden stage, concrete floors, and concrete-beam ceilings with exposed equipment and lighting. A lounge with tiled and carpeted floors, gypsum-board and acrylic wall panels, and acoustic ceilings, is next to the auditorium. The cafeteria, extending off the rear elevation, has a gypsum-board partition to the northeast, separating it from the rest of the first floor; the cafeteria's other walls are part of the facade and contain full-height glass windows. The rest of the cafeteria, covering 15,000 square feet (1,400 m^{2}), has tile floors and exposed-concrete columns and ceilings. The kitchen has ceramic-tile finishes, with metal panels on the ceiling, while the remainder of the first floor has utilitarian finishes such as exposed concrete surfaces. As of 2024, the first story contains the Bell Theater at Bell Works, which has 285 seats.

==== Atrium ====
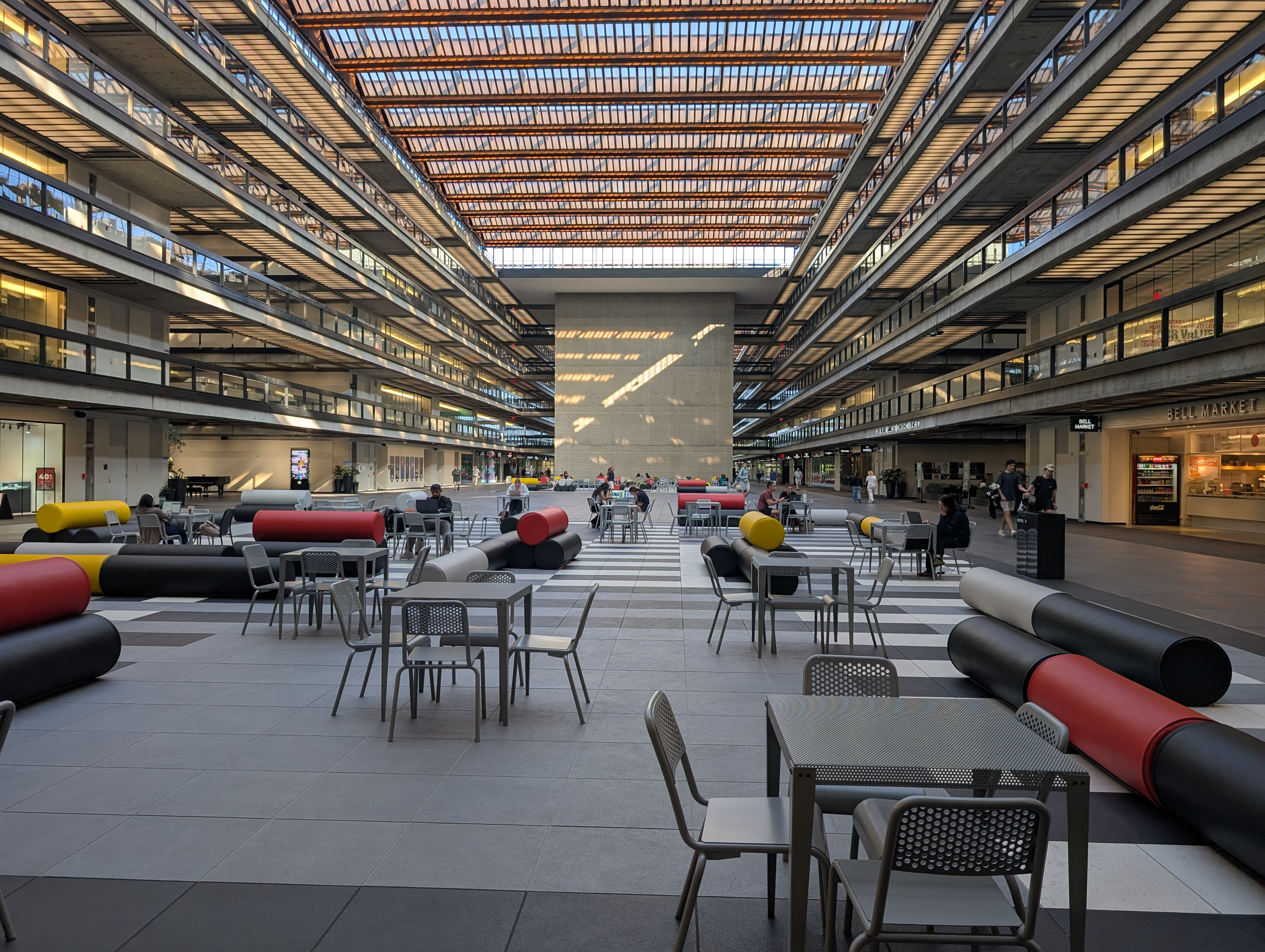
Elevated walkways overhang a glass-roofed central atrium along the northwest-southeast axis of the building, lined with shopfronts and seating areas.

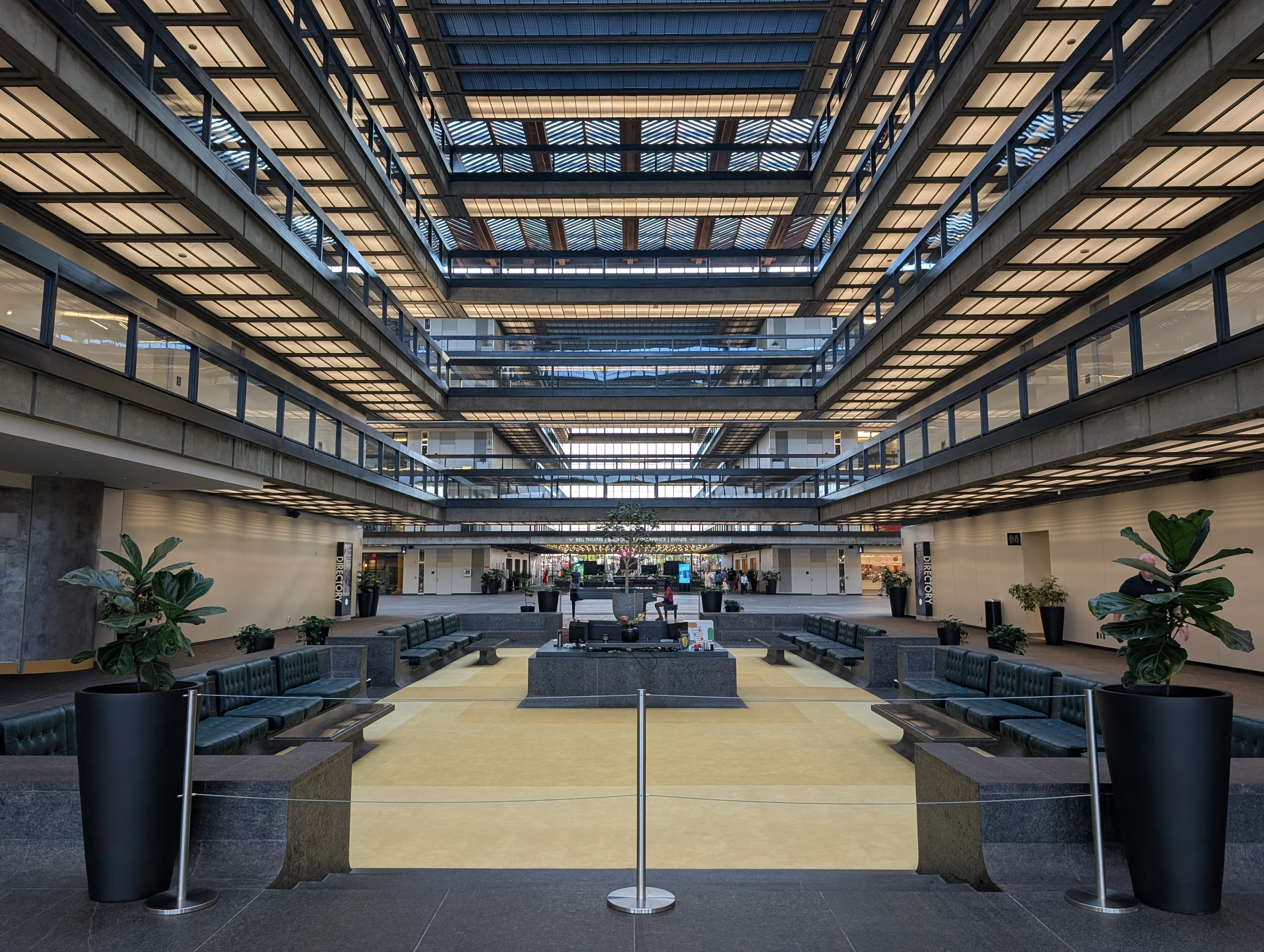
The front entrance leads to a reception area with a conversation pit, described by Architectural Forum as the world's largest in 1962.

The central atrium, located on the second floor, is 100 feet (30 m) wide. As built, it was originally 700 feet (210 m) long, the same length as the original building; subsequent expansions increased the atrium's length to 1,000 feet (300 m). The atrium generally features vinyl tile floors, gypsum and metal-board walls, and concrete ceilings with egg crate–shaped lighting grilles. Saarinen also installed concrete planters for formal plantings. Each concrete planter was 8 feet (2.4 m) tall and could hold a Java fig. In addition, there were 18-foot-wide (5.5 m) planting baskets made of stainless steel.

The atrium consists of two perpendicular axes, around which the entire building is generally symmetrically arranged. The shorter, northeast–southwest axis connects the front entrance with the staircase to the first floor, located at the rear of the building. The front entrance leads to a reception area with a reception desk and a conversation pit, the latter of which was described in Architectural Forum as the world's largest conversation pit when the building was finished. According to Irving Plattner of Saarinen's office, the presence of the conversation pit eliminated the need for movable furniture, which Plattner said "would have slid all over the place". The longer, northwest–southeast axis includes the original structure's elevator towers and the 1980s annexes' elevators. At the axes' intersection, there are two grayscale porcelain-tile artworks on the walls, which are decorated to resemble a Josef Albers painting.

The redeveloped atrium has astroturf fields. In addition, the atrium contains numerous storefronts, and the Monmouth County Library operates a branch location. The retail space includes a food hall, wine bar, restaurants, fitness centers, and doctors' offices. Some of the retail spaces include entertainment facilities such as a golf simulator, virtual reality games, an escape room, and a pickleball court.

==== Pavilions ====
The atrium's axes divide the second to sixth stories into four pavilions, each with office and laboratory spaces. The original tenant, Bell Labs, accommodated slightly more than 1,000 staff members in each pavilion, with offices and laboratories adjacent to each other. At atrium level, the second story has a walkway around its perimeter, while above this level, the pavilions are linked via skybridges surrounding the atrium and walkways along the building's perimeter. The presence of the perimeter walkways was intended to alleviate congestion within each pavilion. Although the laboratories and offices did not generally have windows abutting the perimeter walkways, some were added in later years. The spaces were divided by concrete walls and had movable metal partitions as well. The movable partitions have glass panels at their tops, illuminating the offices and laboratories, and could be mounted to anchors in the floors and ceilings. Stationary furnishings such as cabinets, closets, and shelves are placed along the walls.

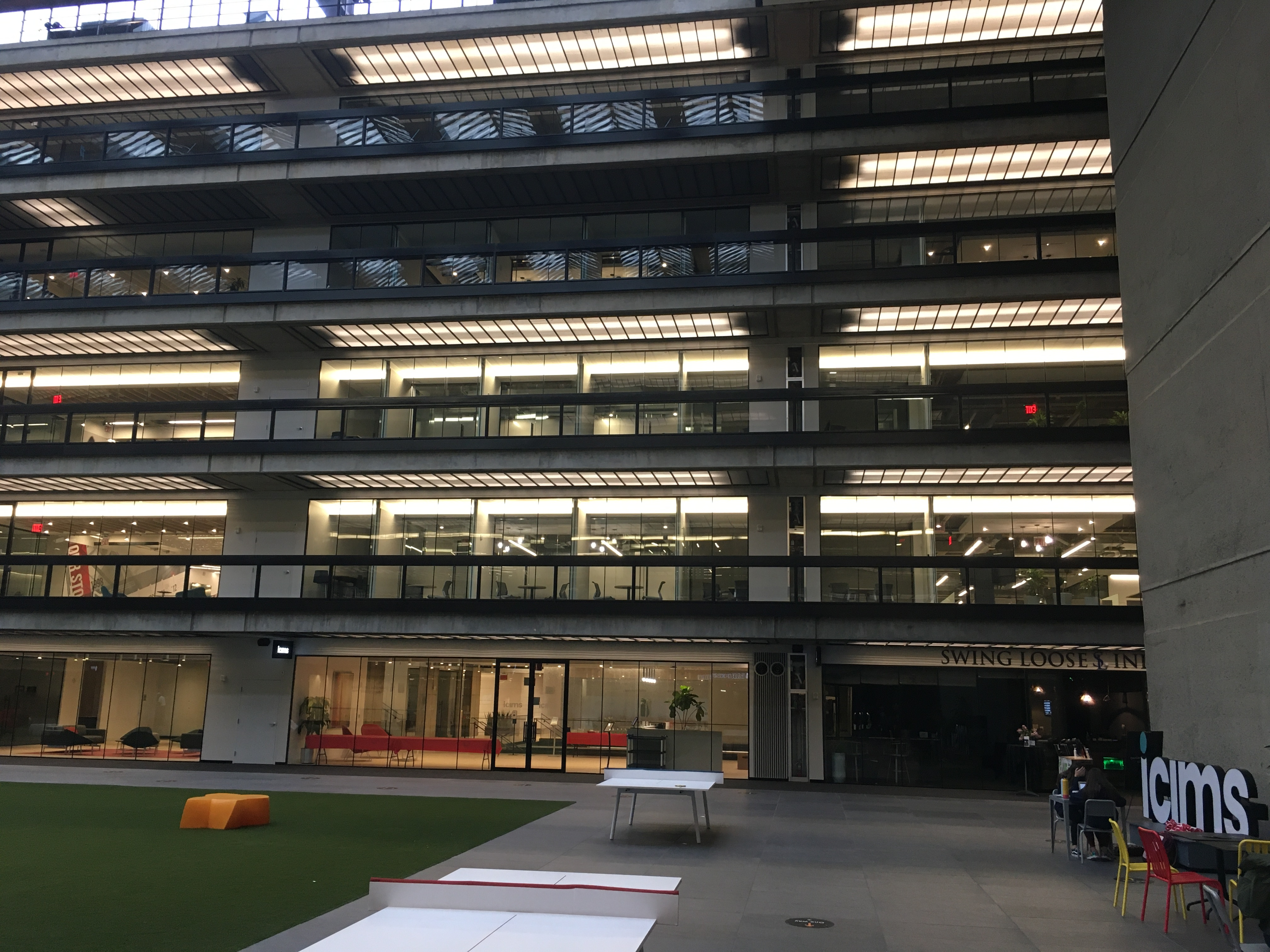
View from the southeast atrium toward a multi-story pavilion. Anchor tenant iCIMS occupies multiple floors of this section.

The pavilions' stories have similar layouts and are arranged on grids of 6-by-6-foot (1.8 m × 1.8 m) modules. Adjacent modules could be combined to create larger rooms. The original laboratories and offices were placed along passageways running perpendicularly to the perimeter walkways, arranged in a similar manner to stripes on a gridiron football field. On each floor, there were originally six such passageways in every pavilion. (Note: This figure is consistent with other sources: A source from 1962, when only two of the pavilions had been completed, cites each floor as having 12 passageways.; A source from 1966, after all four pavilions were built, cites each floor as having 24 passageways.) The hallways were flanked by 12-foot-wide (3.7 m) bays of offices and 24-foot-wide (7.3 m) bays of laboratories. When Bell Labs used the building, several laboratories were set aside for experimental technologies.

The second floor was mostly open plan, with wider secondary and narrower tertiary passageways connecting the perimeter walkway to the atrium. The second-story spaces typically included laminated carpeted or tiled floors; steel doors; gypsum-board or metal walls; movable partitions; and acoustic-tile, gypsum-board, or plain concrete ceilings. The secondary passageways lead to restrooms. On the upper stories, hallways extended inward from the perimeter, with secondary passageways to the restrooms and elevator towers, and tertiary passageways to the offices and laboratories. The upper stories generally had floor surfaces with vinyl tiles and carpeting; walls with gypsum and metal boards; and ceilings with acoustic tiles. The upper-story spaces were variously partitioned or open plan. The sixth floor's southern corner had an executive suite with carpeted floors, acoustic walls and ceilings, and wooden paneling.

The interiors were subdivided into 1,000-to-3,000-square-foot (93 to 279 m^{2}) offices and larger coworking spaces during the 2010s redevelopment. In addition, glass partitions replaced the original non-transparent partitions. The offices along the atrium share features such as coved lighting and drywall soffits on the ceilings.

== History ==
=== Early research ===
Bell Telephone Laboratories had used the site since 1929, when it purchased farmland in Holmdel, New Jersey, to establish a radio reception laboratory. This new facility replaced a smaller tract in Cliffwood, New Jersey, used from 1919 to 1930. The Holmdel laboratory, operating with a transmitter laboratory in Deal, New Jersey, was used by the Bell Labs Radio Research Division to conduct experiments on shortwave radio transmission and reception to improve the reliability of the Bell System's transatlantic radiotelephone services. The laboratory, a single-story building with a clapboard facade, was an auxiliary location for the main Bell Laboratories Building in New York City. The old laboratory building, also known as the Hendrick Hendrickson House, dated from 1730 and was relocated in 1960, when Saarinen's Bell Labs building was constructed.

==== Radio astronomy and antenna design ====
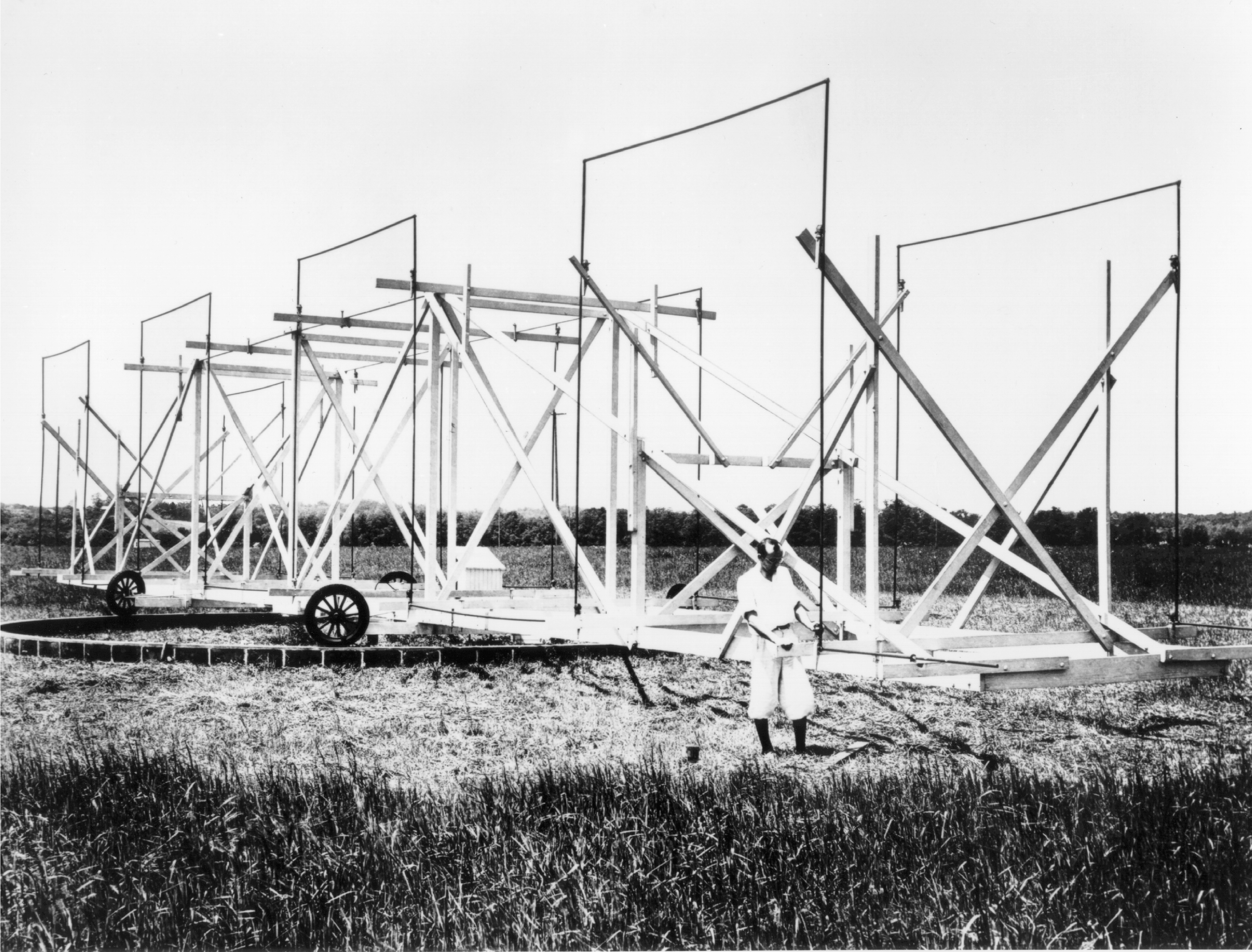
Karl Jansky with his rotating directional antenna at the Holmdel site in the early 1930s. This device is recognized as the world's first radio telescope.

This site is recognized as the birthplace of radio astronomy. In 1928, AT&T Bell Telephone Laboratories assigned Karl Jansky to investigate sources of radio static interfering with the transatlantic shortwave radiotelephone service operated by the Bell System. To locate the interference, Jansky designed a 100-foot (30 m) rotatable directional antenna, a "Bruce Array" based on a design by his colleague Edmond Bruce, fitted with a parasitic reflector and mounted on wheels and axles from a Ford Model T so that it completed a rotation every 20 minutes; staff nicknamed it the "merry-go-round." The array was first built at the company's Cliffwood Beach laboratory and was later relocated to the Holmdel site, where it was placed away from laboratory buildings to reduce local interference.

By 1932, Jansky had identified a "steady hiss-type static of unknown origin," classifying it separately from static caused by local and distant thunderstorms. After studying the direction of the hiss-type static for over a year, and with guidance from then-Princeton University doctoral candidate Albert Melvin Skellett, Jansky concluded that the signal came from a fixed point beyond the solar system - in the direction of the center of the Milky Way galaxy. He announced his findings at an April 1933 meeting of the U.S. National Committee for the International Union of Radio Science and published it later that year. The discovery was widely reported in international press but drew little immediate interest from astronomers, and Jansky was unable to pursue this line of investigation further. A monument to the discovery, a model of Jansky's antenna oriented to match the array's alignment at the moment of detection, was dedicated on June 8, 1998 at the original site of the antenna in Holmdel.

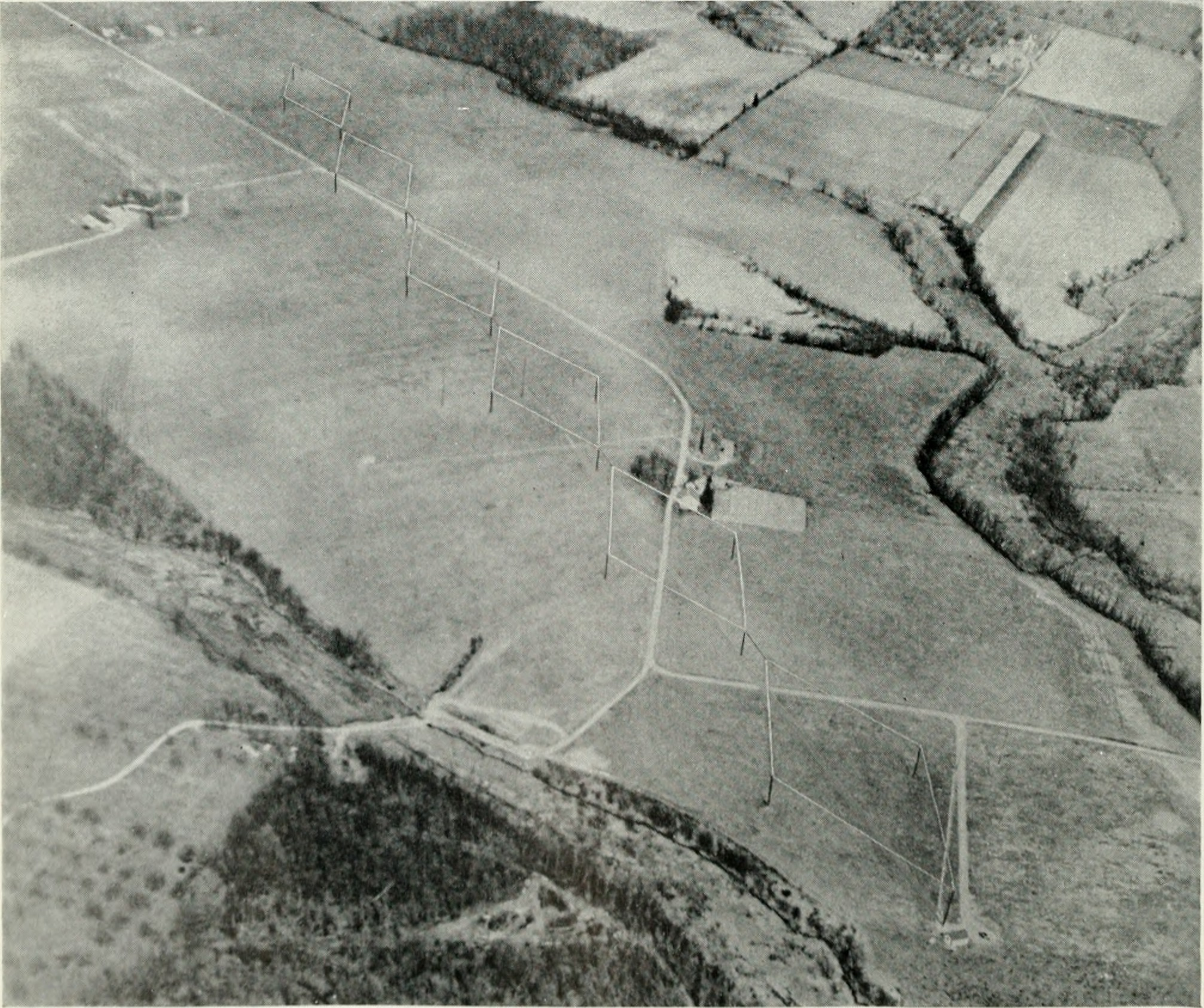
An array of six rhombic antennas was used for the Multiple Unit Steerable Antenna (MUSA) system, which operated at Holmdel during the mid-1930s.

The site was also a center for antenna design. Edmond Bruce, a Bell Labs engineer, is credited with inventing the rhombic antenna, for which the Franklin Institute awarded him its 1935 Longstreth Award. Bruce's first published description of the design in 1931 included tests of an experimental rhombic antenna at the Holmdel site. In the mid-1930s, Jansky's supervisor Harald T. Friis, working with C. B. Feldman, developed the Multiple Unit Steerable Antenna (MUSA) to improve transatlantic radio reception by countering the fading caused by multipath propagation. Operating at the Holmdel site, MUSA used a row of six rhombic antennas extending about 3/4 mile (1.2 km) aligned toward a transmitter in England, each connected to the receiver by individual coaxial cables. Rather than physically moving the antennas, engineers steered the vertical angle of reception electronically using phase shifters, isolating the signal arriving at the best angle. Compared with the largest fixed antenna of its era, MUSA yielded a signal-to-noise ratio improvement of seven to eight decibels.

In subsequent years, radio research was conducted at the separate Crawford Hill facility, about 3.1 miles (5.0 km) away. There, using a 50-foot (15 m) horn-reflector antenna originally built in 1959 for the Project Echo communications satellite experiments, Bell Labs Holmdel radio astronomers Arno Penzias and Robert Wilson discovered cosmic microwave background radiation, publishing their result in 1965. The discovery, which provided evidence for the Big Bang, earned Penzias and Wilson the 1978 Nobel Prize in Physics, and the Holmdel Horn Antenna was later designated a National Historic Landmark.

==== Waveguides and WWII developments ====
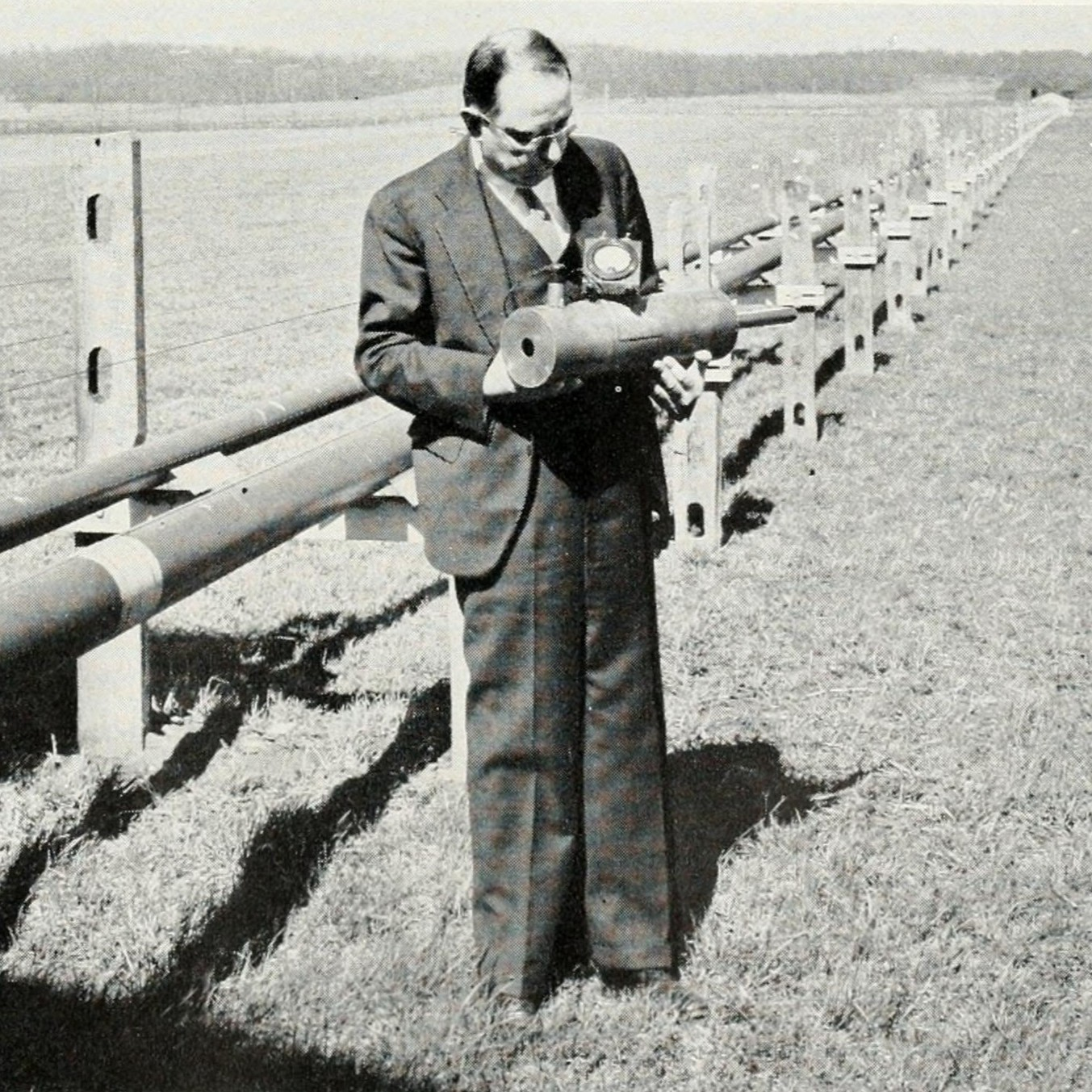
George Southworth standing in front of two experimental waveguides at Holmdel. Southworth is holding a microwave cavity resonator.

George Clark Southworth had begun investigating hollow-pipe waveguides at the Bell Labs Netcong, New Jersey test facility in the early 1930s, where in late March 1932 he first observed microwave propagation through a water-filled copper pipe; he switched to air-filled pipes the following year after building a Barkhausen–Kurz oscillator operating at a 16-centimeter wavelength. Theoretical analysis was conducted by mathematicians Sergei Schelkunoff and Sallie Mead. After mid-1934, Southworth relocated the project to the Holmdel site, where expenditures grew and where he was joined by development engineers A. P. King and A. Bowen. Over the next four years, the Holmdel team further developed waveguide technology, work that historian Karle S. Packard called "a major contribution to the application of electromagnetic waves above 1 GHz." One early goal was to use circular waveguide as a high-capacity, long-haul communications medium using the low-loss TE_{01} mode, an ambition that remained a major focus of the Holmdel group for years even though Southworth himself concluded as early as 1939 that microwave radio was preferable to long waveguide transmission lines.

During World War II, research shifted toward military microwave radar, in which waveguide found its first major application. On September 24, 1940, during the Tizard Mission, British scientists John Cockcroft and Edward George Bowen visited Holmdel, where they and Southworth's group exchanged information on radar and waveguide techniques. The mission's central disclosure, the British cavity magnetron, had been revealed to American researchers days earlier; it would later spur a rapid expansion of U.S. microwave-radar research, including the founding of the MIT Radiation Laboratory. In mid-1942, on the suggestion of Harald T. Friis, Southworth detected thermal microwave radiation from the sun at centimeter wavelengths, the first detection of thermal radiation from the Sun; wartime secrecy delayed publication of his findings until 1945.

Wartime research into high-frequency radar detectors also led to a major materials science breakthrough. In the late 1930s, Holmdel electrochemist Russell Ohl began investigating silicon crystals for use as radio rectifiers, finding that purer silicon improved their performance as detectors. On February 23, 1940, while testing a silicon sample that had developed a crack down the middle, Ohl noticed that the current passing through it changed when the sample was held near water, a hot soldering iron, and a desk lamp; by that afternoon, he had determined that light striking the crystal was the cause. On March 6, he demonstrated the effect to research director Mervin Kelly and colleagues, including Walter Brattain, by shining a flashlight on the coal-black crystal and causing its voltage to jump. The behavior arose from a naturally formed P–n junction, the boundary between two regions of differing impurities in a slowly cooled silicon ingot prepared by metallurgists Jack Scaff and Henry Theuerer; Ohl and Scaff later coined the terms "p-type" and "n-type" for the two regions. The discovery is now recognized as the first silicon photovoltaic cell, and the P-N junction became a fundamental building block of semiconductor devices; William Shockley's 1948 junction transistor was built on Ohl's discovery.

==== Post-WWII communications systems ====
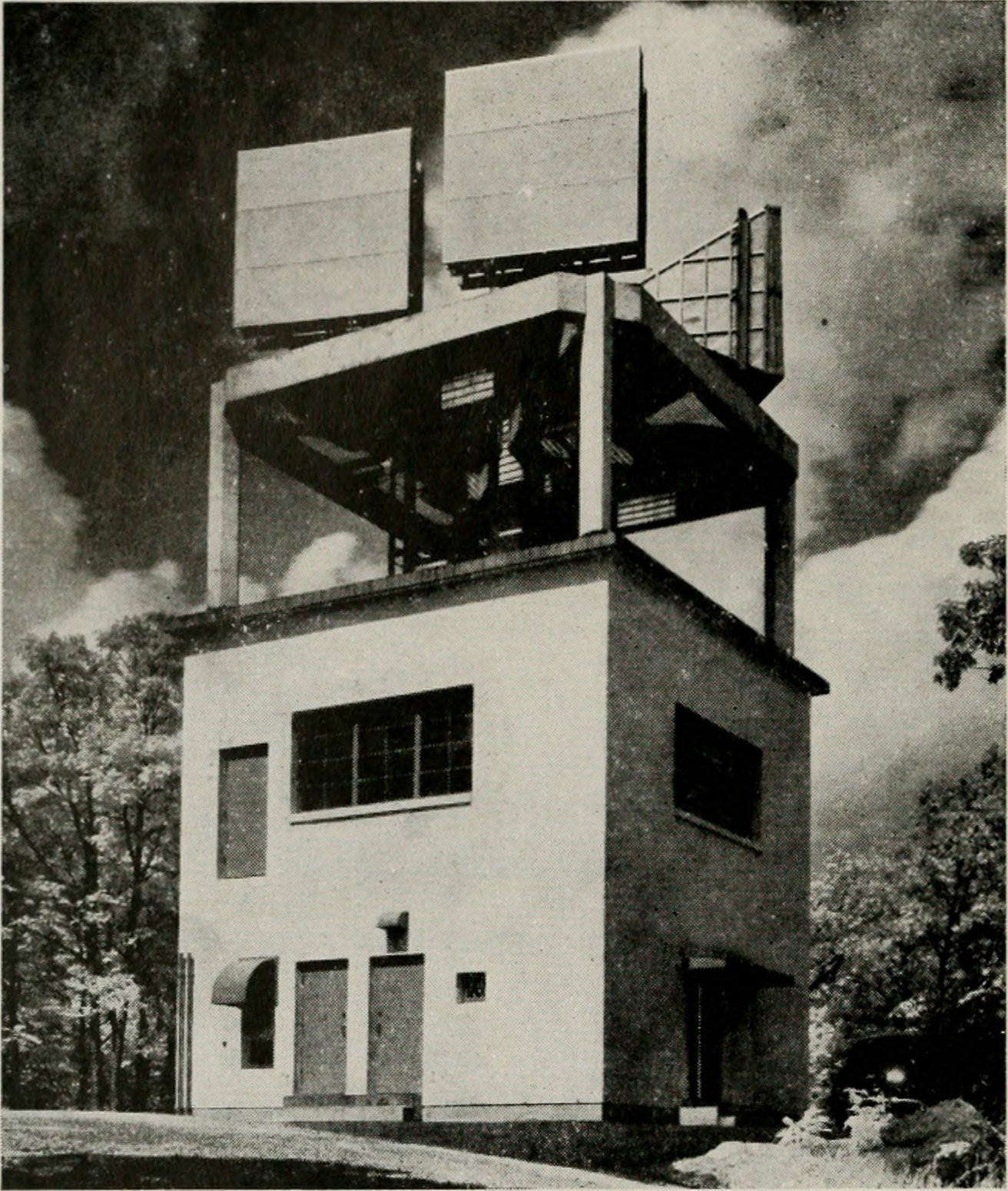
Microwave-radio relay stations, such as this building on Jackie Jones Mountain in 1947, linked New York and Boston as part of the TDX system.

Following the war, work accelerated on long-line microwave radio relays. The TDX system, developed by Harald Friis's radio research group at Holmdel, drew on the site's waveguide and antenna research and was opened for experimental service in November 1947, carrying television and multichannel telephone transmission between New York and Boston. Development of its successor, the TD-2 system, began in January 1947; after years of development, the New York-Chicago link began operating on September 1, 1950 and the Los Angeles-San Francisco link on September 15. TD-2 became the first transcontinental microwave radio system, running from New York to San Francisco with 100 repeater stations in the 4-GHz band, becoming the forerunner of microwave radio routes that carried much of U.S. long-distance telephone and television traffic in the following decades.

In December 1947, Bell Labs engineer Douglas H. Ring, assisted by colleague W. Rae Young, completed a memorandum titled "Mobile Telephony - Wide Area Coverage" while working at the company's radio laboratory in Holmdel. The memo set out an early version of what would later be called the cellular network: rather than serving a region from a single, high-powered antenna, it proposed a "honeycomb" of small hexagonal cells. Each cell would be a few miles across and assigned its own set of frequencies, so that frequencies could be reused in non-adjacent cells, allowing a vehicle's call to be handed off from one cell to the next as it moved. The memo attracted little attention at the time; it was forwarded to the Federal Communications Commission to support Bell's request for more radio spectrum, then filed away unpublished. The concept was not revived until the mid-1960s, when AT&T renewed its push for the mobile spectrum.

=== New building development ===
In the mid-1950s, as the construction of the Garden State Parkway spurred increasing development in the Holmdel area, Bell Labs decided to buy land around its existing Holmdel site to safeguard it against development. By the end of the decade, the older facilities could no longer accommodate the lab's expanding scope. As such, in 1957, the American Telephone and Telegraph Company (AT&T) began planning a research laboratory in Holmdel; at the time, the site employed 130 people. The Holmdel site was selected for its proximity to AT&T's research centers in Whippany, Murray Hill, and Manhattan; its elevated location; and its large ground area.

==== Planning ====
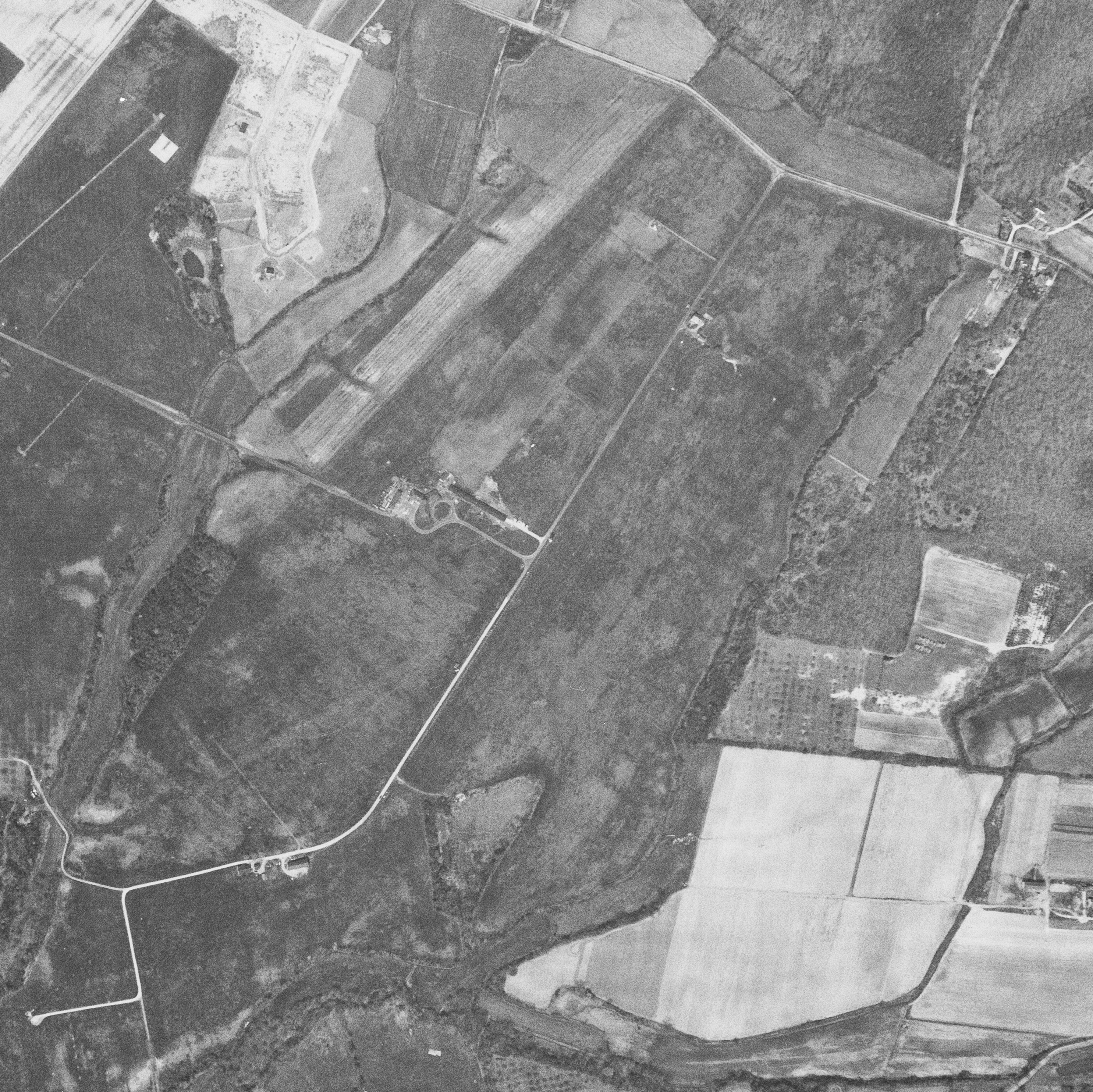
The site in 1953, prior to the construction of the Saarinen complex. The original radio laboratory buildings are visible across the landscape.

The architect Eero Saarinen was commissioned in April 1957 to conduct a study for Bell Laboratories' proposed Holmdel development. AT&T officials were unsure of the development's size but anticipated that it would eventually employ up to 4,000 or 4,500 employees. Saarinen's study found that the existing buildings were poorly suited for Bell Labs' needs because of their inconvenient positioning and external disturbances. Saarinen's firm was formally hired in January 1958, and he created a design that conformed to AT&T's requirements that the facility be cost-efficient, readily adaptable, and easy to maintain. He drew up plans for a rectangular, glass-walled structure, with an interior courtyard surrounded by four pavilions of office space. The site, covering 430–450 acres (170–180 ha), (Note: Multiple figures are cited: 430 acres (170 ha); 433 acres (175 ha); 450 acres (180 ha)) was to include two lakes, parking lots, and vehicular access roads.

AT&T's board of directors approved Saarinen's plans in April 1959, although the completion of the working drawings was expected to take another six months. The first phase was tentatively expected to cost $20 million and accommodate 1,500 workers, The structure's development was part of a larger capital plan for AT&T, variously cited at $50 million or $100 million. The Bell Labs Holmdel Complex was one of five major industrial complexes that Saarinen designed in the 1950s, along with the General Motors Technical Center, IBM Rochester, IBM Watson Research Center, and the John Deere World Headquarters; architectural writer Alice T. Friedman described these projects as having signified a more mainstream acceptance of Saarinen's work. It was also one of Saarinen's final projects before his death in 1961. In conjunction with the new complex, Jersey Central Power & Light planned a new electrical substation nearby, and Holmdel Township officials widened several nearby roads.

==== Construction ====
New Lab at Holmdel
A 1962 promotional film created by Bell Telephone Laboratories documenting the 1959–1962 construction of the building.

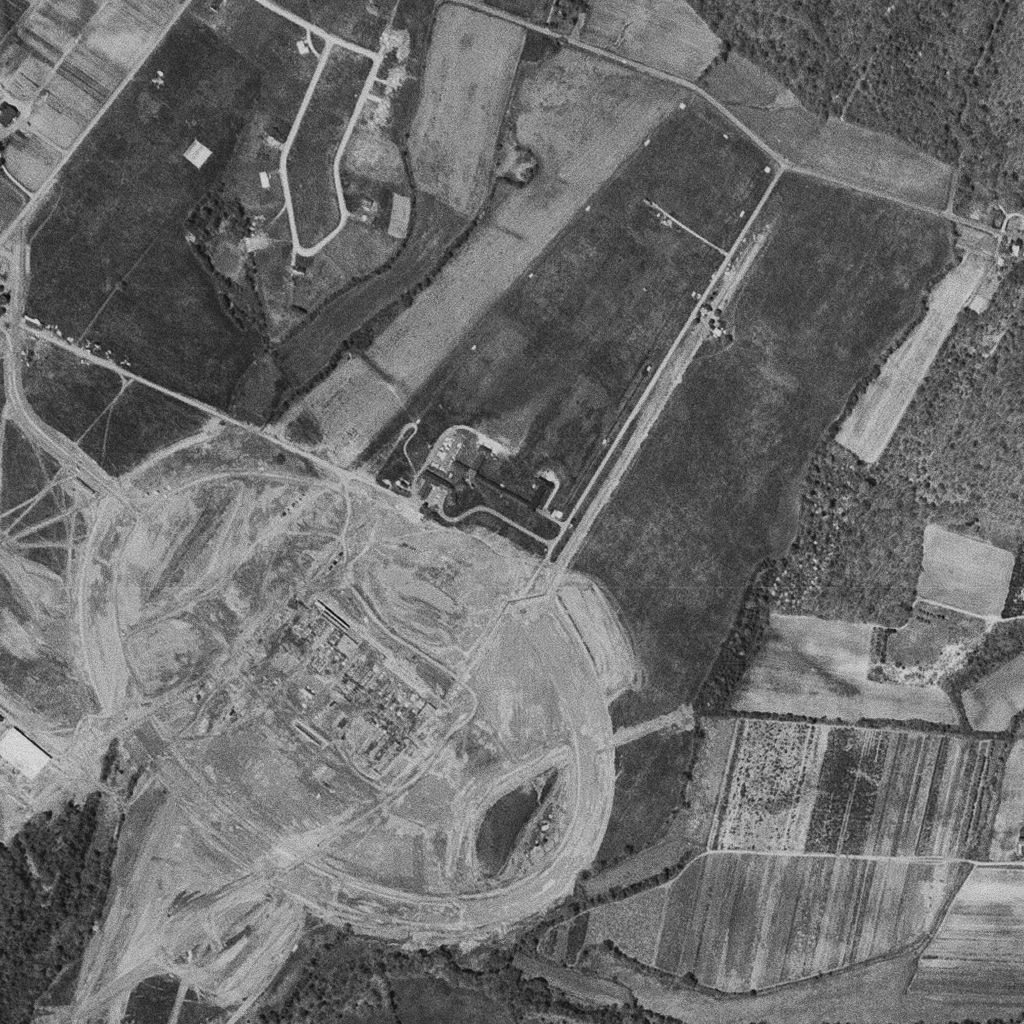
The complex under construction in May 1960. Foundation work was briefly halted during this period following the discovery of lime-rich mud in the soil.

A groundbreaking ceremony took place on August 27, 1959. The construction was overseen by Western Electric, which along with AT&T owned half of Bell Labs. A firm from Newark, the Frank Briscoe Company, was hired as the building's general contractor. The first phase of the building consisted of two pavilions flanking the main entrance, along with an auditorium, cafeteria, and library. The construction of the foundation required driving 6,500 piles and was delayed when workers discovered marl, or lime-rich mud, in the ground. Western Electric engineers had geotechnical specialists re-survey the site, and work on the foundation was halted between March and May 1960, although other parts of the project continued uninterrupted. The discovery of marl caused a six-month delay. Contractors had built most of the foundation by July 1960, including the portion underpinning the complex's proposed second phase. Work on the superstructure was underway, with part of the facade and one elevator tower having been built to a height of several stories. In addition, contractors had laid 3 miles (4.8 km) of roads and had nearly finished a nearby service building.

By early 1961, work on the first two pavilions was nearing their respective top floors, with the first workers moving in later that year. At that point, the company planned to have 600 employees on site in January 1962, gradually increasing that number to 2,400 over several months. Bell Labs also announced that they would begin constructing a second phase with two more pavilions, although the company's board deferred this expansion. Bell Labs began training the new Holmdel complex's first staff members in the complex's newly completed service building in June 1961. Saarinen Associates drew up plans that July for a southward extension containing a cafeteria. By October, five hundred construction workers were putting the final touches on the first-phase pavilions, including the facades. Simultaneously, contractors began installing office and laboratory equipment. As part of the complex's construction, the existing buildings were demolished, and the site was re-landscaped. The Hendrickson House was salvaged by the Monmouth County Historical Association. The old buildings were replaced by a new laboratory on Crawford Hill, since that site did not have radio-wave interference or other obstructions.

The first Bell Labs staffers began working in the new Holmdel campus in February 1962, and hundreds of employees were relocated from other laboratories in New Jersey and New York. The complex was completed in June and was fully operational by September, with 2,600 staffers. To celebrate the building's completion, Bell Labs hosted open-house events for Bell Labs employees and their family members, and for local residents. The first two pavilions had a combined footprint of 700 by 135 feet (213 by 41 m), and their construction involved over 4,000 short tons (3,600 long tons; 3,600 t) of steel rebar and 50,000 cubic yards (38,000 m^{3}) of poured concrete. The project had cost $20 million ($163 million in 2025). Though the pavilions had a gross floor area of 715,000 square feet (66,400 m^{2}), the offices and laboratories occupied only half that area, 360,000 square feet (33,000 m^{2}). The first-phase pavilions contained a temporary cafeteria, to be used until the second phase was completed, while the adjacent parking areas could accommodate a combined 2,100 vehicles.

==== Second-phase expansion ====
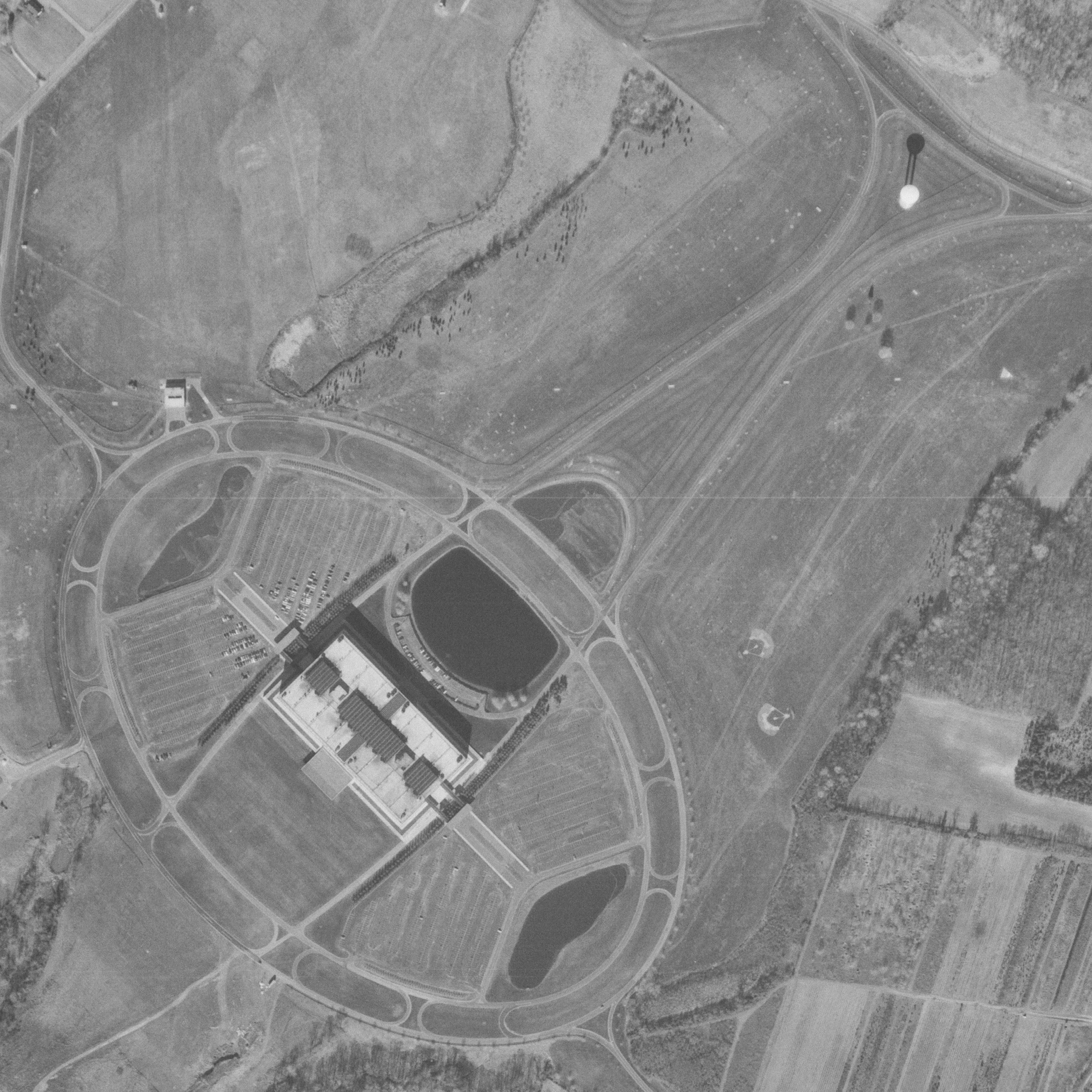
The complex in December 1969. The second phase of construction had recently extended the building to the southwest.

The opening of the new building caused more than half of its employees to move to Monmouth County. Although the facility employed 2,800 workers by early 1963, there was still no timeline for constructing the second-phase pavilions. Bell Labs president James Brown Fisk told New Jersey governor Richard J. Hughes about the plans in January 1964, and the company announced in April that it would finally begin constructing the second phase. The project's cost was variously cited as $14 million or $22 million. The two pavilions would be nearly identical to the existing structures, and the project was also to include expansions of the parking lots and the service building.

Roche-Dinkeloo, the successor firm to Saarinen's architectural practice, oversaw the design of these pavilions, and the Frank Briscoe Company was rehired as the general contractor. After the general contract was awarded in May 1964, work began the next month. In conjunction with the expansion, Bell Labs planned to relocate 750 or 800 employees from Holmdel to a new building in the Chicago suburbs. Bell Labs also planned to move more than 2,000 employees to Holmdel, which by early 1965 had 3,200 employees. Contractors were completing the expansion by mid-1965, and they also replaced the non-reflective glass panels in the original building.

Staff began moving into the second-phase pavilions in February 1966, and other employees concurrently began moving to the Chicago suburbs. The complex was designated as a civil defense shelter that June, and the second phase formally opened on December 5, 1966. The expansion brought the building's total area to 1.2 million square feet (110,000 m^{2}), with dimensions of 700 by 350 feet (210 by 110 m). At that point, the complex had either 3,600 or 4,000 employees, with space for up to 5,300. In addition, the complex's expanded parking lots could fit 3,300 cars, and the defense shelter could accommodate 7,500 people, including residents of surrounding areas. An education center in the building opened the same year, and there were also plans for an industrial waste disposal facility at the complex.

=== Bell Labs usage ===
Used as a research and development (R&D) complex, the Holmdel laboratory served the needs of the Bell Laboratories division of AT&T. Basic research, applied hardware development, and software development occurred in the building, which at its peak had 6,000 employees. Bell Labs Holmdel specialized in telecommunications innovations, including mobile phone and fax technologies, as well as other fields of research such as microwaves, modems, solar power, and lasers. In addition, the complex was used for quality assurance experiments. The building's mostly open-plan layout made it easy for Bell Labs, and later Lucent, to conduct mechanical and equipment upgrades.

Bell Labs Holmdel's presence attracted highly educated scientists from afar. Several of its employees won Nobel Prizes, including Steven Chu, who won a Nobel for his laser cooling work. Arno Penzias and Robert Wilson, who won the Nobel Prize in Physics in 1978 for their discovery of cosmic microwave background radiation, conducted their research at the nearby Crawford Hill annex while based at the Holmdel complex. Holmdel itself became known as a company town for the highly educated, and Gary D. Aumiller, one of Holmdel's mayors, credited Bell Labs with having increased the town's population. At one point, one-fifth of the town's tax revenue came from Bell Labs, which paid the town $4 million annually.

Because the building was so large, staff from different departments seldom ran into each other in the hallways. As such, numerous social clubs were created for the building's employees. These included board-game, sports, and wine-tasting clubs, along with a flying club that offered plane rides over the Jersey Shore, a model railroad club, a garden club, and an astronomy club that built a telescope to observe the Rings of Saturn. With a large multinational population, the complex frequently hosted celebrations of national heritage. Over the years, employees often came even on the weekends to socialize, and they frequently hosted events and played practical jokes on each other. During a severe blizzard in the winter of 1964, the roads became impassable, forcing many employees to sleep overnight within the facility. Numerous businesses, such as a bank and fitness center, were opened to serve the building's employees. The complex had its own emergency services, baseball and cricket fields, and 200 maintenance staff.

==== 1960s to mid-1980s ====
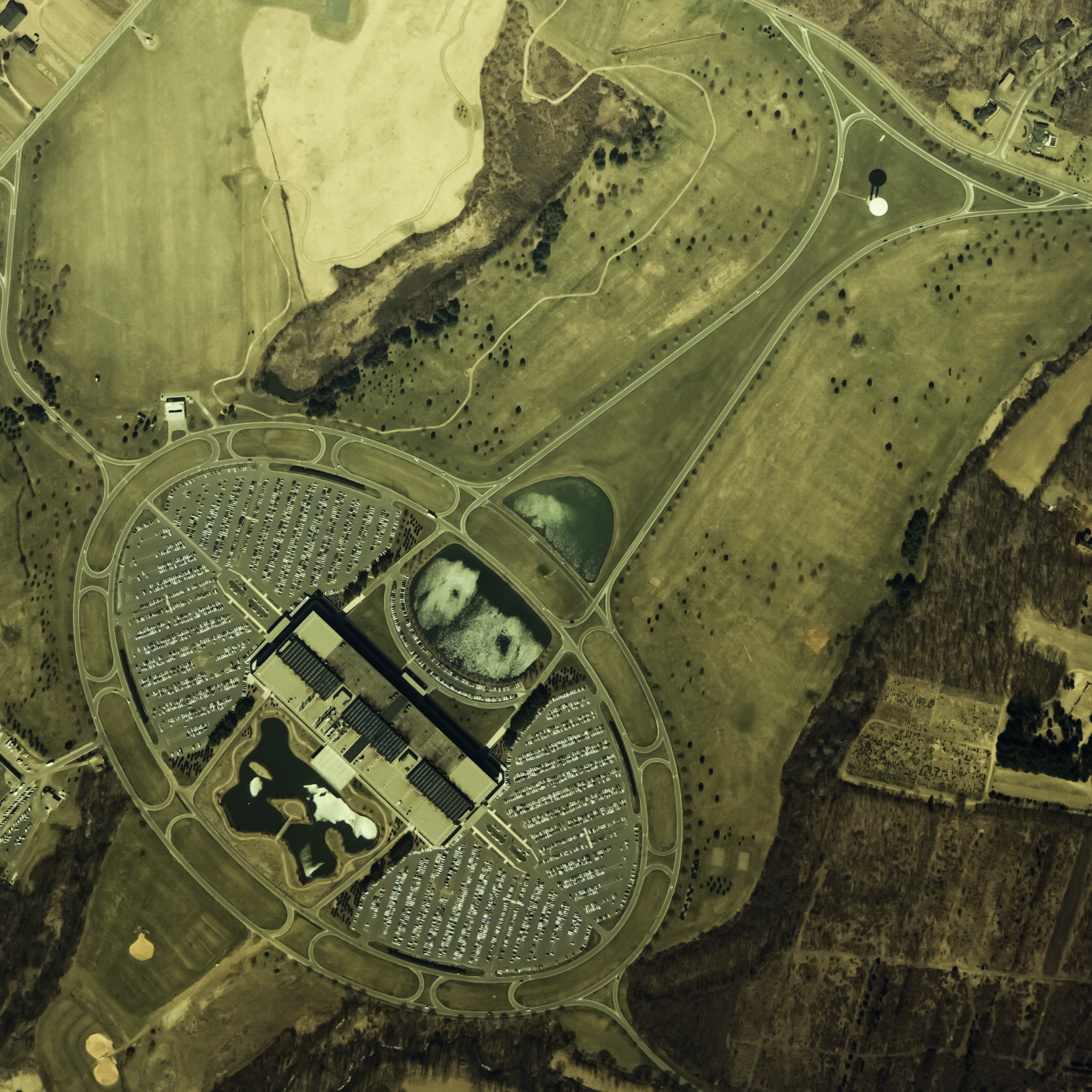
The complex in 1987, showing the building's final footprint. The building was extended to the northwest and southeast in the early 1980s, requiring infill of the original side ponds.

When the first phase opened, Bell Labs Holmdel was used for the development of telephone technologies. By the time the second-phase pavilions were completed, employees were developing technologies as Picturephones, Trimline telephones, and Touch-Tone telephones, along with computer, laser, and holography systems. A 1967 newspaper article cited the building's staff as primarily being involved in R&D for transmission systems, switching systems, systems engineering, and consumer products. The complex was handling a quarter of Bell Labs' activity by 1969, and many of the staff had advanced degrees; one-tenth of employees had doctorates. With 4,300 employees at the time, it was Bell Labs' largest office.

In Bell Labs Holmdel's early years, its staff were rarely laid off. During that time, staff worked on projects such as Unix operating systems, digital signal processor chips, and space and military defense technologies. Bell Labs relocated the Holmdel laboratory's switching-system development team out of the building in 1973, and the company leased additional space nearby in 1977. Bell Labs proposed constructing an ocean-simulation laboratory on the site the same year, with a pressure-testing trench and an observation building, By then, the complex had about 4,000 workers; the main building had become overcrowded.

Bell Labs' board of directors commissioned Roche-Dinkeloo to draft plans for a further expansion in 1978 and authorized the project in early 1979. The expansion included a pair of 250,000-square-foot (23,000 m^{2}) annexes flanking the existing structure, along with parking-lot enlargements and re-landscaping; the project was to increase the building's capacity to 6,000 workers. Holmdel Township officials approved the initial plans in October 1979 but, following objections from a neighboring landowner, re-approved the plans the next June. The Walsh Construction Company, the expansion's general contractor, filled in the ponds adjacent to the main building so it could construct deep foundations for the annexes. The original facade design and site layout remained intact. The expansion was completed in 1982, (Note: Some sources give a completion date of 1985.) bringing the building to its final size of two million square feet (190,000 m^{2}). The township approved the construction of a storage structure on the site the next year.

==== Mid-1980s to 2000s ====
The breakup of the Bell System led to further changes in Bell Labs' operations. Some of the building's employees were moved to American Bell's building in Lincroft during 1982, and AT&T Technologies took over Bell Labs Holmdel when the breakup was finalized two years later. After the split, the building's staff developed technologies such as superconductors, virtual reality, and videophones. As part of a 1992 agreement, AT&T agreed to construct a pair of pump stations serving Bell Labs Holmdel and other nearby buildings. As an eventual result of the Bell System's breakup, in 1995, Bell Labs bought out the employment contracts for many of the complex's 6,000 employees. Even as many of AT&T's other facilities had been sold off, Bell Labs retained the Holmdel complex. The next year, Bell Labs became part of Lucent, which itself merged into Alcatel-Lucent after a decade. The complex was rebranded after its new owner.

A monument to Karl Guthe Jansky was dedicated on the campus in June 1998. As late as the end of the 20th century, Lucent employed at least 4,700 workers there, (Note: Another source cites the building as having 5,600 workers in 2000.) or 3% of Lucent's entire staff. The complex had transitioned away from more traditional scientific research, focusing specifically on electronic technologies. The building generated more than $4 million in property taxes every year, a sizable amount for the small Holmdel Township. The company hired Kling Lindquist to renovate Bell Labs Holmdel's cafeteria around 2000. After the dot-com bubble burst, Lucent split off or sold most of Bell Labs' former divisions. The technology company Agere Systems, which split from Lucent in 2002, leased some of the building's space from Lucent. When Agere announced in 2003 that it would move all its remaining staff to Pennsylvania, the Holmdel building's staff had declined to 1,700 employees.

=== Decline and preservation efforts ===
Lucent began soliciting buyers for Bell Labs Holmdel in June 2005, citing high operating costs. There were only about a thousand employees by then, and the facility was too large for the greatly-reduced staff. Before a final deal was reached seven years later, there were three unsuccessful proposals for the site.

==== Preferred Real Estate Investment plans ====
Lucent initially did not plan to sell the property to a residential developer. In March 2006, Lucent contracted to sell the facility to Preferred Real Estate Investments, a Pennsylvania developer; as part of the agreement, Lucent would relocate all employees by the following year, regardless of whether the sale was finalized. Preferred wanted to redevelop the site, as it claimed that a renovation was infeasible and that the spaces would be hard to lease out. Preferred's plans entailed demolishing the building, constructing several smaller structures, and retaining the site's layout. Though the building remained publicly inaccessible except by appointment, Preferred wanted to host one final public event there. The demolition plans prompted outcry from scientists around the world. Architecture fans and former Bell Labs employees also endorsed preserving the complex, and the technology blog Engadget suggested converting the complex into a museum.

Preferred had revised its plans by September, which called for preserving and restoring the original pavilions while demolishing later additions. The plans also included constructing 250 to 300 homes, a component that attracted opposition. The housing plans prompted dissenting residents to form the Citizens for Informed Land Use group and were a central campaign issue in a 2007 primary election for Holmdel's township committee. Former Bell employees created another group, Preserving Holmdel, to advocate for retaining the complex's original appearance. The complex was added to The Cultural Landscape Foundation's list of the state's ten most endangered historic sites in May 2007. The township created an advisory board to study future uses of the site. Alcatel-Lucent relocated the building's final employees in August, and Preferred reneged from its acquisition later that year. The local newspaper The Record described it as the nation's largest vacant office building.

==== Somerset Development plans ====
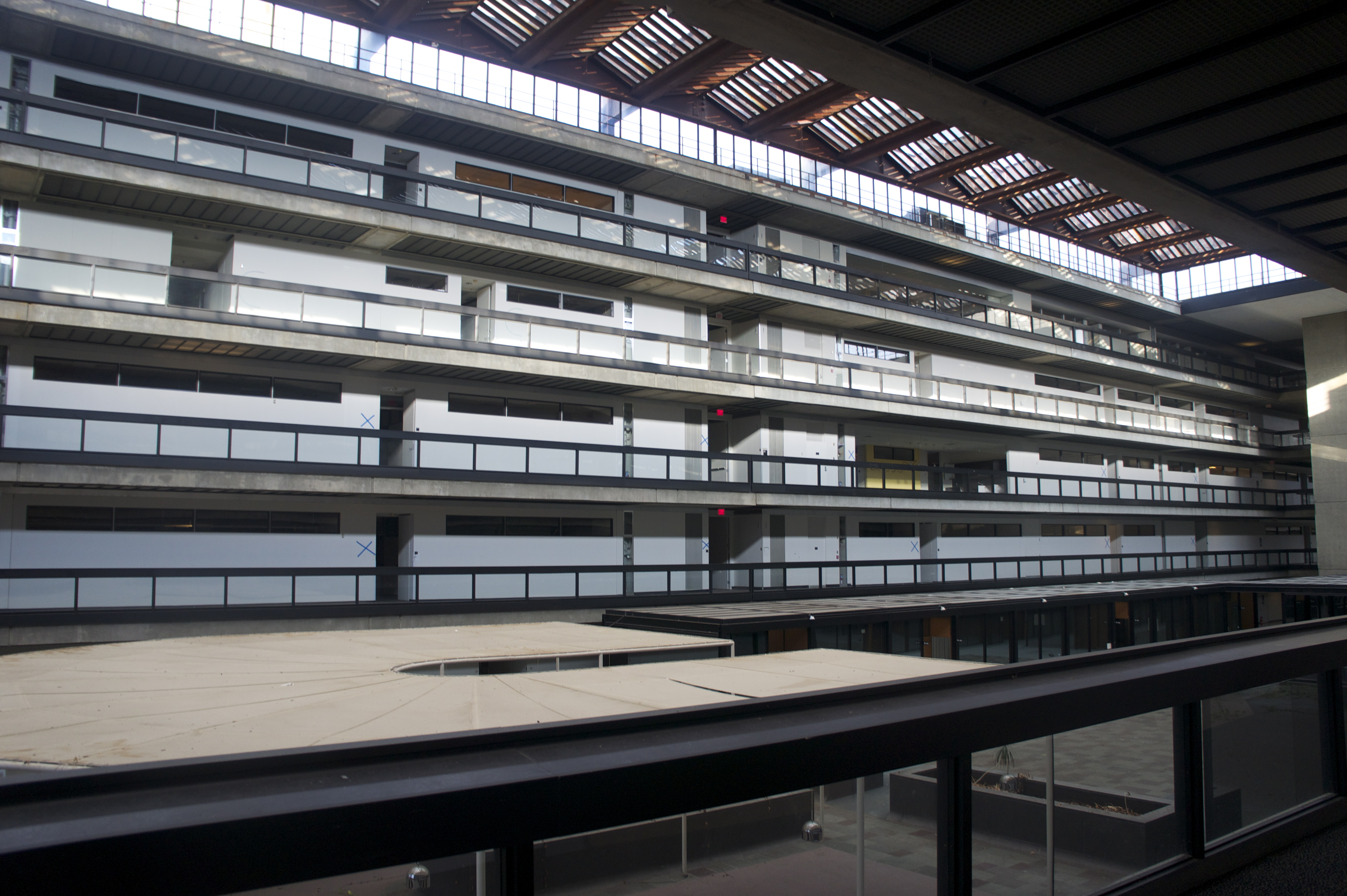
The disused interior of the main building as seen in 2012. The solid walls on each floor are a relic of its historic use as laboratory spaces.

Alcatel-Lucent was seeking another buyer by early 2008, at which point the only occupants were a skeleton staff of caretakers. The firm contacted Central Jersey developer Ralph Zucker, the chief executive of development firm Somerset Development (known after 2022 as Inspired by Somerset Development). That April, several groups hosted a charrette to devise proposals for the site's reuse, later publishing these proposals in a book. Somerset offered to purchase the complex that August. Due to the impossibility of finding a single large tenant, Zucker wanted to convert the building into a mixed-use structure with multiple occupants. Zucker attempted to finalize his purchase and obtain approvals over the next several years, revising his plans multiple times while negotiating with residents and local officials. The site also needed to be rezoned to permit a mixed-use redevelopment with multiple tenants, but the rezoning was delayed.

The complex's demolition was proposed in January 2009 as part of a report commissioned for the township, and Zucker proposed redeveloping the site the next month with 600 residences, a hotel, commercial space, and offices. The mixed-use plans incorporated ideas from the previous year's charrette. Zucker submitted formal plans to the township in July and hosted his first public event in the building that September, downsizing the plans to 398 residences. The plans were a major campaign issue in Holmdel Township's 2009 council election; one losing candidate distributed anti-development leaflets targeting Zucker. Following township officials' continued hesitancy to the plans, Zucker downsized the residential component further to 30 units.

Holmdel Township considered rezoning the site in 2010, but with no agreement in place by the end of the year, Alcatel-Lucent threatened to take back ownership. Township officials and Somerset executives were regularly hosting meetings by early 2011, and township officials classified the site as an "area in need of rehabilitation" that year. Negotiations continued over issues such as sewer service. By that December, the township was preparing to vote on Somerset's revised plans, but the vote was delayed after Alcatel-Lucent objected that the township's vote would prevent significant changes to the site.

==== Howard plans and final sale to Somerset ====
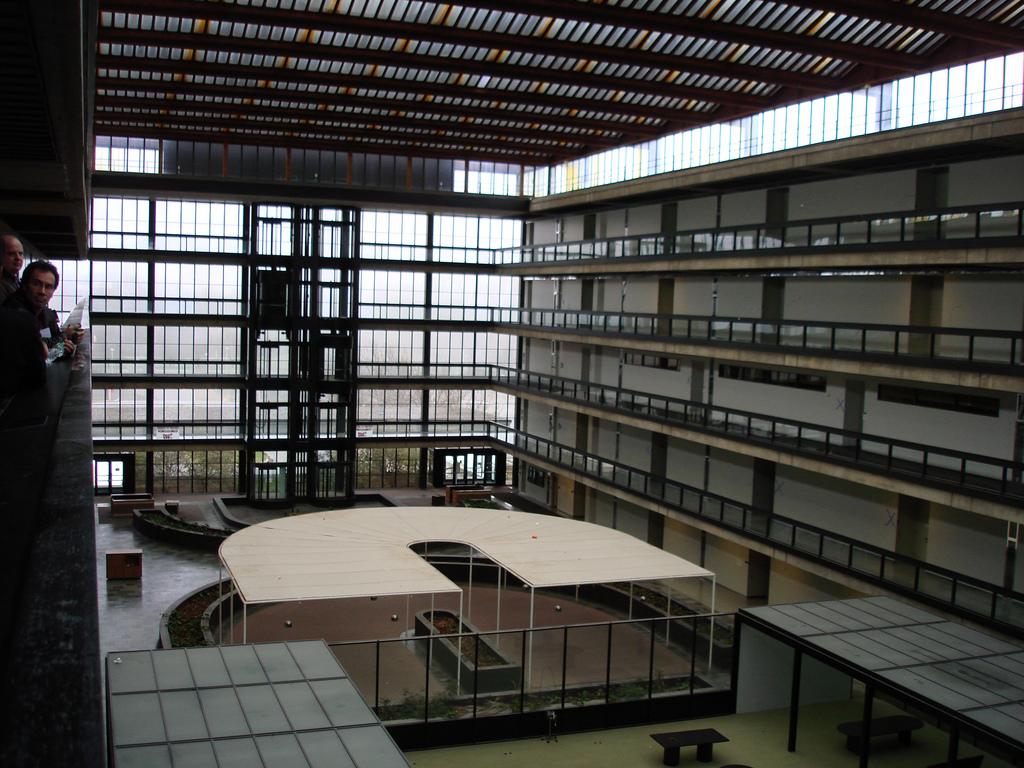
Visitors to the vacant building overlook the atrium. The building was visibly deteriorating; a puddle from a ceiling leak and overgrown plants are visible.

Amid continued delays, Alcatel-Lucent sought a new buyer and ended negotiations with Somerset. Alcatel-Lucent offered to sell Bell Labs Holmdel to Florida businesswoman Elsie Sterling Howard in February 2012. MBI Project Management, which oversaw the plans for Howard's firm Elsie Sterling Oversight, considered obtaining a state tax credit in advance of the redevelopment. In May 2012, Holmdel Township adopted a redevelopment plan, which included adaptively reusing the main building and constructing 225 residences outside the elliptical roads. The sale to Howard ultimately did not proceed when she forfeited an option to buy the site. Instead, Somerset signed a contract to buy the complex that October, in conjunction with an unnamed equity partner. Somerset's plans retained the 225 proposed residences and also included recreational space. The atrium would become a public pedestrian zone and was tentatively supposed to include stores and a public library. The upper stories were to have 400,000 square feet (37,000 m^{2}) for health- and wellness-related companies.

Somerset received initial approval to buy the site in March 2013. After Holmdel Township officially approved the redevelopment of Bell Labs in August, Somerset finalized its purchase that month for $27 million. The township's approval permitted the building to be converted to a mixed-use property. At the time, the building was visibly deteriorating, with a leaking roof and an overgrown interior. Somerset retained Saarinen's structure and agreed to sell 103 acres (42 ha) of land to Toll Brothers, which planned 225 houses on its portion of the site. The deal with Toll Brothers helped provide the financial capital for Bell Labs Holmdel's redevelopment. The start of construction was delayed while township officials and Somerset executives negotiated a tax-exemption agreement, which was approved in June 2014. The township approved Toll Brothers' residential development the next month.

=== Transition to mixed-use facility ===
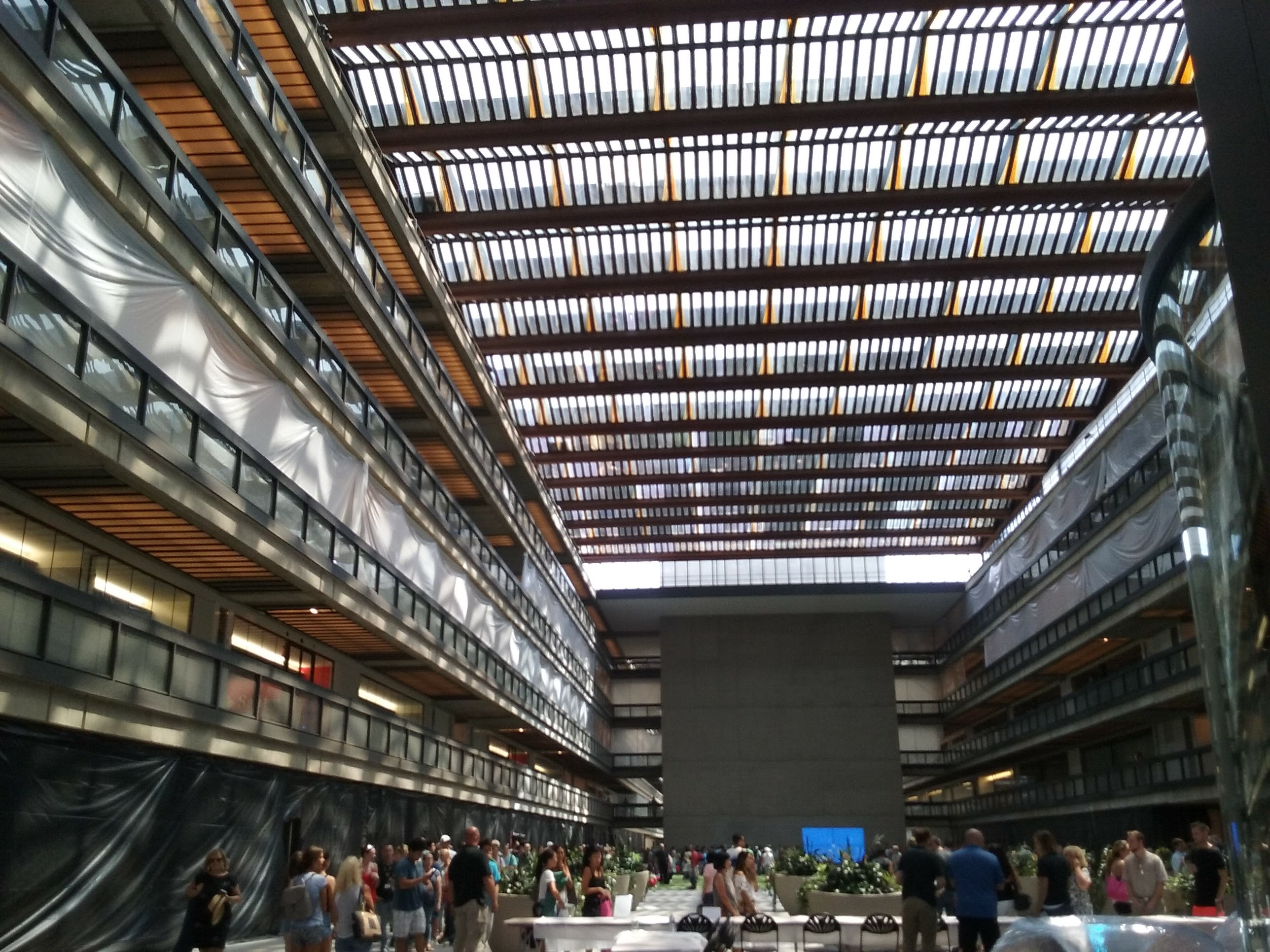
Plastic tarps cover some elevated walkways as laboratory partitions were replaced with glass, seen here during August 2017.

Somerset received demolition permits for the interior in May 2014 and began seeking tenants the next month. Workers had cleared the atrium's debris and had begun restoring architectural details by that August, at which point the complex was 25% leased and had been named Bell Works. Zucker hired Alexander Gorlin Architects to design the master plan. The project included replacing the partitions with glass and redesigning the atrium floors. In addition, the structure underwent energy-efficiency renovations and mechanical upgrades, and the built-in technological systems were replaced. Zucker also hired real-estate firm The Garibaldi Group, marketing firm Co Op Brand Partners, and interior decorator NPZ Style + Décor. Two architecture firms were hired to redesign the interiors, and a public-relations firm promoted the complex on social media. The project was initially budgeted at $100 million, but, by 2015, was estimated to cost twice that much.

Zucker described Bell Works as a "metroburb", which he called "an urban hub—a core, a metropolis—in a suburban location", with entertainment, residential, retail, and office uses at a single site. Somerset converted the interiors into coworking spaces and small offices, which were designed to resemble dense urban offices while also being flexible. Bell Works' atrium became a pedestrian street with stores and community services. In addition to office space, the building includes storefronts and a public library. Bell Works began hosting conferences and events, including annual Fourth of July fireworks, and the Axelrod Performing Arts Center in Deal agreed to operate the building's Bell Theater. The building also includes cables preserved from Bell Labs' occupancy, including a piece of the world's first submarine fiber-optic cable.

==== Mid- and late 2010s ====
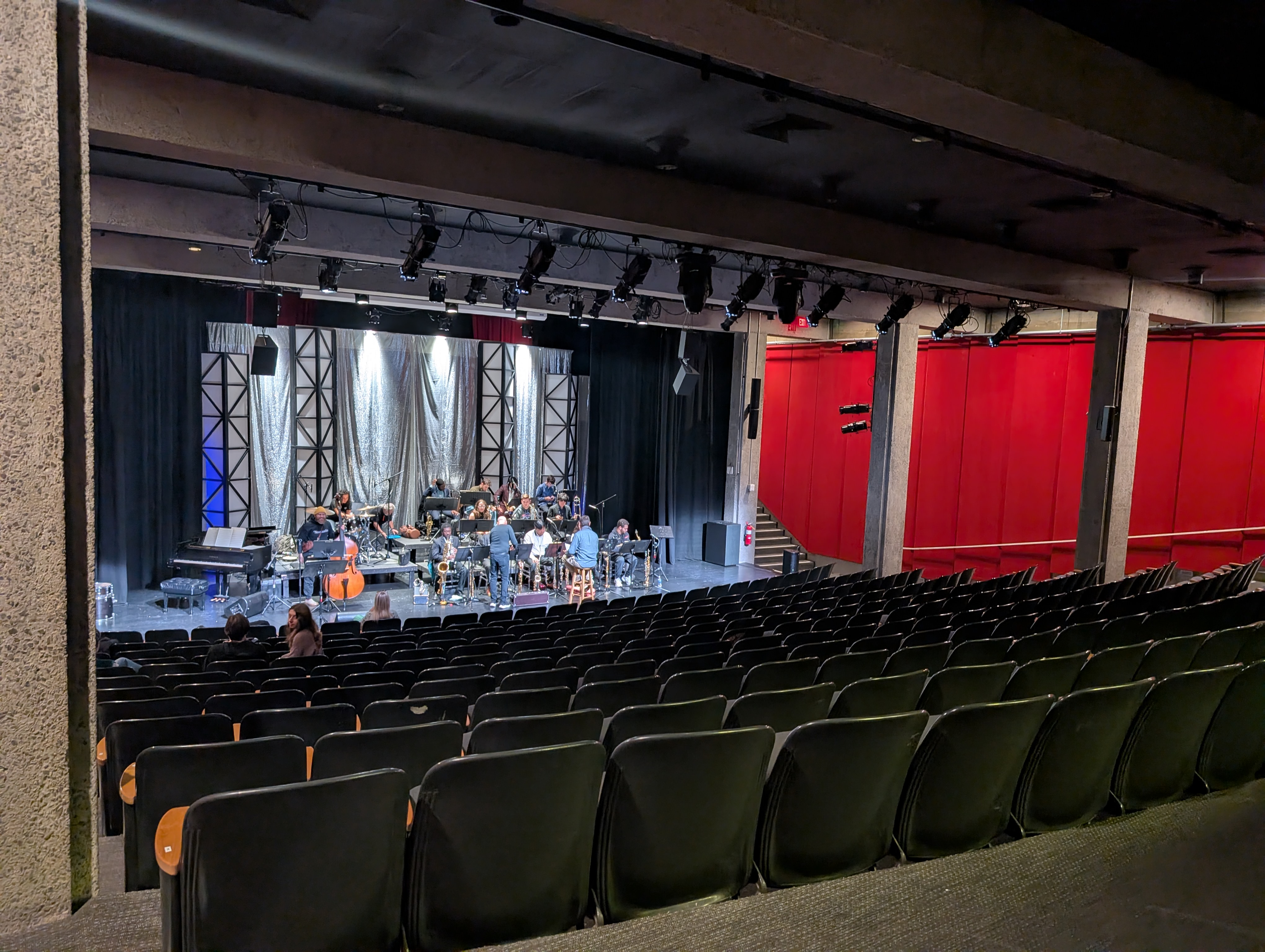
A band practices during a public rehearsal at the Bell Theater, located in what was formerly a lecture hall on the first floor.

With Zucker's permission, in early 2015, two entrepreneurs briefly used the abandoned building as a coworking space for technology firms. Zucker was also planning a hotel inside. The first tenant was a broker who leased a small office; the first major tenants, including telecommunications firm Spirent, signed leases in November 2015. Numerous large and small firms subsequently expressed interest in Bell Works. and technology company iCIMS became Bell Works' anchor tenant in 2016. Other early tenants included Jersey Central Power & Light, International Flavors & Fragrances, insurance company Guardian Life, media company Vydia, and technology firm Nvidia. Several tenants received state tax credits in exchange for relocating. Somerset leased one storefront to Monmouth County Library rent-free, which opened in late 2017. The same year, Investors Bank lent Somerset $70 million to fund the redevelopment, by which the building was three-quarters leased.

The Holmdel Township government approved plans in 2018 for a hotel atop the Bell Works building. The hotel, with 186 rooms, would be built on the sixth floor, with conference and event space, a restaurant, and an auditorium. Destination Hotels was hired to operate the hotel that September and was subsequently acquired by Hyatt. A food hall opened in the building that year. The complex was more than 90% leased by 2019, with 80 tenants, many of which were technology firms or departments. The developers borrowed another $200 million that December to fund additional work, which was substantially completed that year.

==== 2020s ====
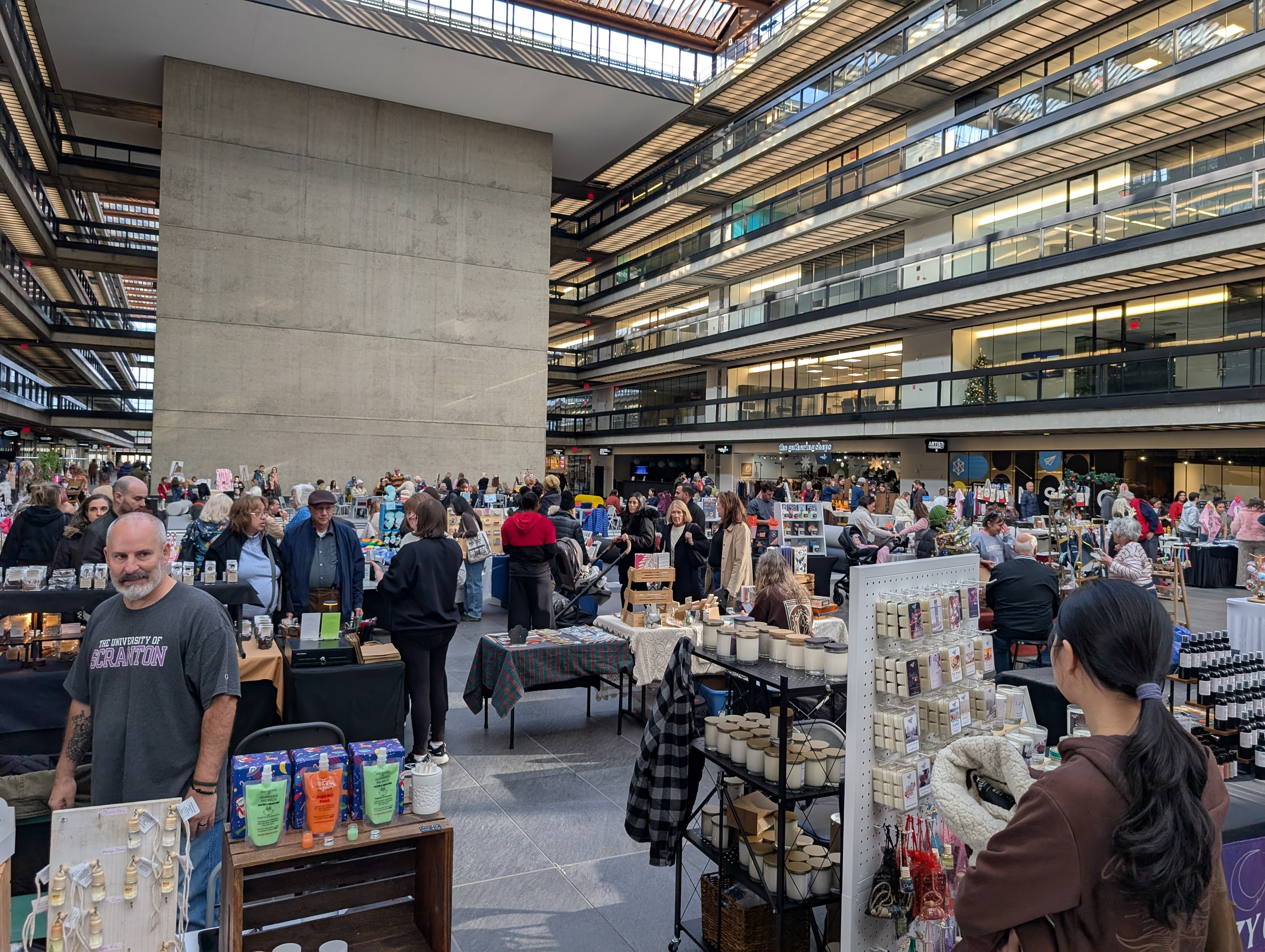
Vendors and storefront owners sell products at a farmers' market in the central atrium, hosted by Bell Works.

During 2020, the building was temporarily closed due to the COVID-19 pandemic, and Somerset gave the township $5 million as part of their redevelopment agreement. The hotel plans were postponed during the pandemic, as Zucker prioritized using the remaining vacant space for hybrid work. The Bell Theater at Bell Works opened in May 2024 in what was formerly a lecture hall at the laboratory. Later that year, the building's first sit-down restaurant opened; by then, the structure was 98% leased. The last remaining vacant space was leased in April 2026. Hovnanian Enterprises moved its headquarters to Bell Works that year.

In July 2026, Somerset Development applied to subdivide the property and build a 108,000-square-foot (10,000 m^{2}), 40-megawatt data center on it. The application was filed on July 24, three days after Holmdel Township introduced an ordinance banning data centers, and before its adoption on August 11; the township attorney said that the earlier zoning still applied. Residents objected to the project's water, power, and noise impacts, while Zucker said that the facility would use closed-loop cooling and would be located away from the main building.

== Impact ==
=== Reception ===
During Bell Labs Holmdel's construction, the Asbury Park Press wrote that the structure gave an impression of "grace and lightness", despite its concrete frame. The same publication wrote that the main building resembled a chicken coop when juxtaposed with the water tower. When the building was completed, Walter McQuade of Architectural Forum wrote in 1962 that it was "not only symbolic of modern science, but symbolic also of the yielding of architecture to science"; a subsequent issue called it "the biggest mirror ever". The Architectural Record wrote that the building "will have just the right amount of glitter to give it great style and elegance", though the publication wrote that the massive glass facade "would be an architectural disaster" elsewhere. Jerome Zukosky of the New York Herald Tribune called it "easily one of the more spectacular buildings of its type ever built" and a drastic departure from older office designs. Architectural historian Anthony Vidler regarded the completed building as devoid of activity, except for the first story, but praised the design for bringing a "pitch of refinement" to the site.

After the first expansion opened, in 1967, the Asbury Park Press described the building as "a boon to countryside" because of its compact layout. The New York Times wrote in 1972 that the building resembled "a giant, mirror-surfaced box" with a garden inside, and it compared the water tower to a flying saucer. When the building's redevelopment was proposed in the 2000s, New Jersey Society of Architects official Michael Calafati described it as "the most important post–World War II building in New Jersey" and compared its design features to artwork. Saarinen biographer Jayne Merkel wrote in 2006 that the atrium seemed deserted even when the building was at its maximum occupancy.

In 2016, after the building was redeveloped, Architect magazine wrote that "to visit the complex ... is to glimpse the pre-history of our current technological moment". The building was described in the Architectural Digest as New Jersey's "most iconic building", while the Architectural Record said in 2020 that it could serve as a model for similar redevelopment projects. A 2024 book cited the complex as "sprawling, pastoral, inwardly focused on day-to-day work, but outwardly marketed as a site of performative scientific excellence".

=== Awards and design influence ===
When the first part of Bell Labs Holmdel was completed, the New Jersey Business Magazine gave the building a "good neighbor" award, citing the structure's integration with the surrounding landscape. The building's distinctive features, including its mirror-like appearance, led R&D magazine to recognize it as the Laboratory of the Year in 1967. In addition, a local chapter of the New Jersey Society of Architects labeled the building as one of Monmouth County's "most architecturally significant buildings" in 1978. Following the building's redevelopment, it won numerous design and architecture awards, including the Docomomo US Modernism in America Award, Starnet Commercial Flooring Design Award, and the Azure Awards, Architecture Adaptive Re-Use category.

As with many of Saarinen's other designs, Bell Labs Holmdel included architectural features that, at the time, were uncommon in other buildings. Office buildings with reflective-glass facades became more popular after Bell Labs Holmdel was completed, particularly in warmer areas and the developing world. Saarinen refined his use of mirrored glass in his later John Deere World Headquarters, and other buildings such as the Renaissance Center and the John Hancock Tower also used similar design features. In addition, Bell Labs Holmdel's design may have influenced a resurgence of atria in other buildings. After working on Bell Labs Holmdel, Roche designed several additional buildings for Lucent. Architect magazine wrote in 2008 that Bell Labs Holmdel had been one of a series of "sleek office buildings constructed in pastoral, exurban locales". Over its lifespan, the facility and its layout were studied in universities as models of modernist architecture.

The building was catalogued in Monmouth County's historic sites inventory in 1981 because of its facade design and Saarinen's involvement. Since at least 2008, Bell Labs Holmdel had been eligible for inclusion on the National Register of Historic Places (NRHP) because of its architectural and historical significance. Because the suburbs of New York City have weaker landmark-protection laws than the city itself, the complex remained vulnerable to demolition before its redevelopment. The complex was listed on the NRHP in 2017.

=== Popular culture ===
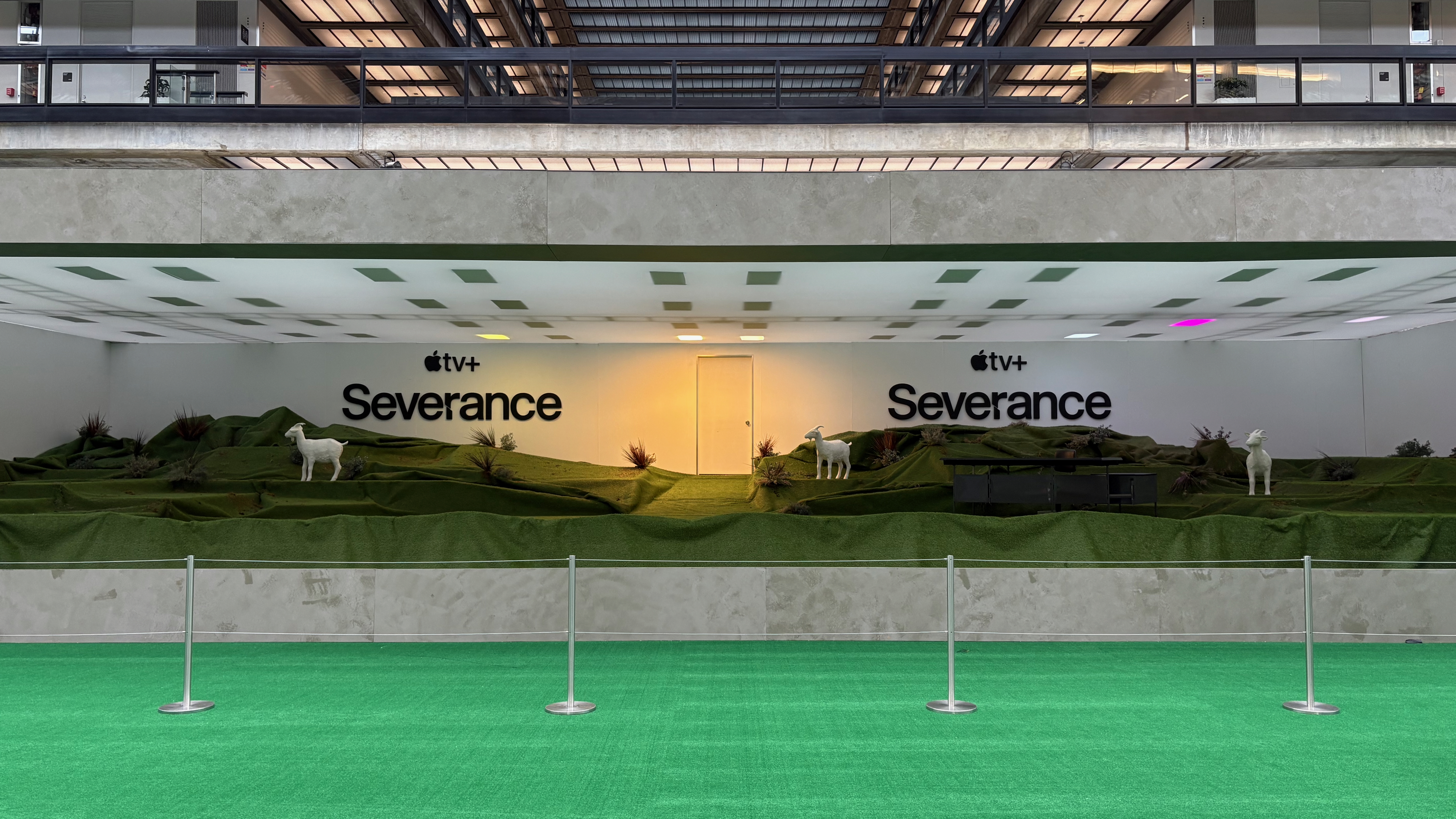
Plastic goats arranged on artificial turf hills reference the "goat room" from Severance, part of a 2025 event at Bell Works.

Bell Labs Holmdel has been used as a filming location for various film, television, and commercial productions, particularly after its redevelopment. A 2017 Cadillac commercial was among the first media works to be filmed at the building. Bell Works was also depicted prominently in the American science-fiction psychological-thriller television series Severance, where it was the fictional corporate headquarters of Lumon Industries. Although much of the show is filmed elsewhere, the building is used for exterior building shots, parking lot shots, and some interior shots of the ground floors. Severance's popularity drew attention to the building in the mid-2020s.

Other productions filmed onsite include Jules, Space Cadet, and episodes of the TV series The Crowded Room, Law and Order: Organized Crime, and Emergence. The complex has also been used for commercials and editorial shoots by brands such as AARP, Lincoln, Michael Kors, Verizon, and Zara.

== See also ==
- List of works by Eero Saarinen
- National Register of Historic Places listings in Monmouth County, New Jersey
- Holmdel Horn Antenna, a nearby Bell Labs property also listed on the National Register
- Nokia Bell Labs
