= ICIMS =

Application management software

ICIMS, Inc.

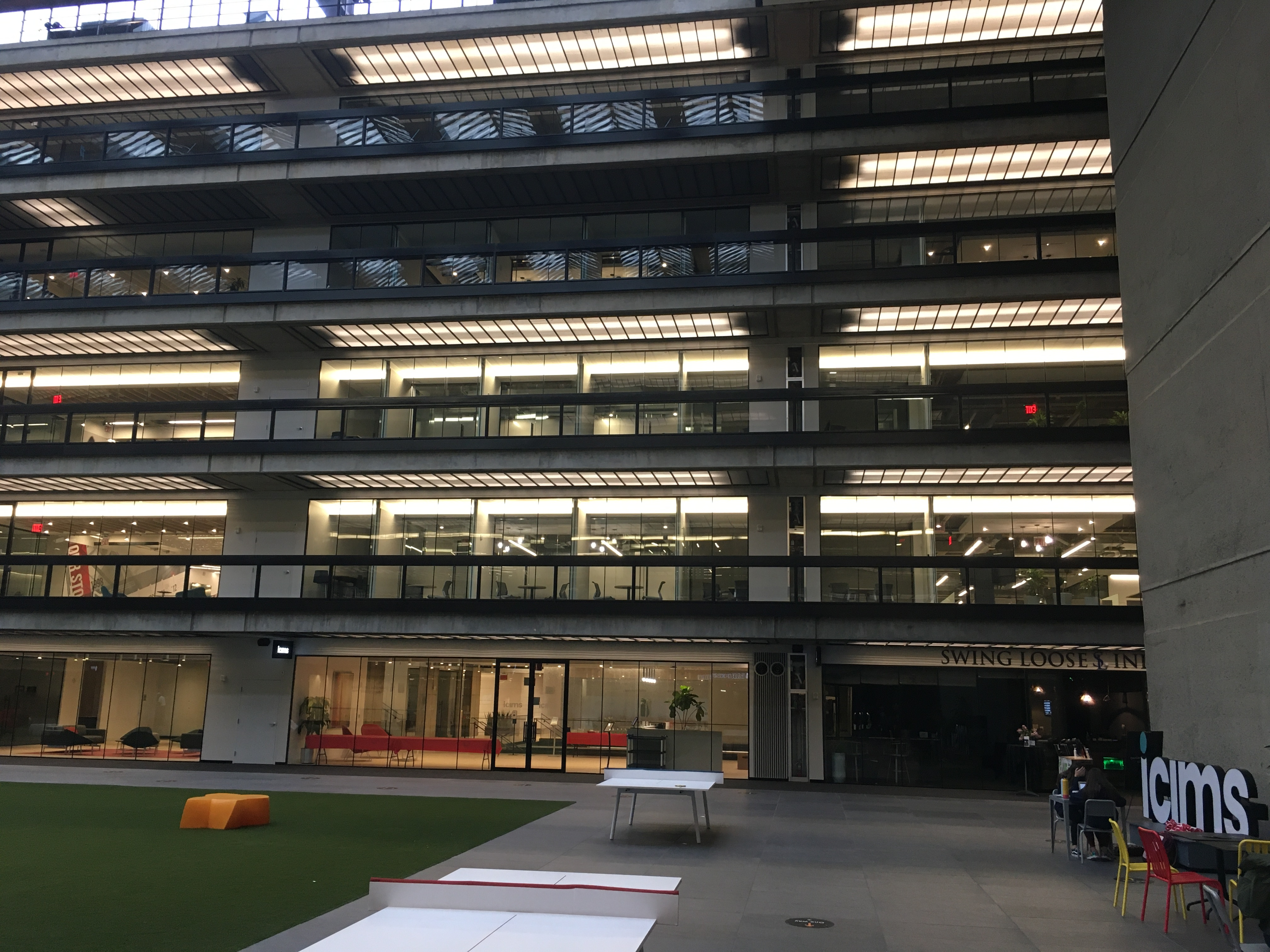
- ICIMS headquarters are in the Bell Works complex in Holmdel, New Jersey.
- Type: Private
- Industry: Software
- Founded: 2000; 26 years ago
- Headquarters: Bell Works; Holmdel, New Jersey
- Products: Career sites, candidate relationship management, applicant tracking system, offer management, onboarding, text and mobile engagement, ICIMS High Volume Hiring
- Revenue: ▼$400 Million (2022)
- Number of employees: 1,400
- Website: Official website

ICIMS, Inc. is a New Jersey-based cloud-based human resources and recruiting software company. The company name is an acronym for Internet Collaborative Information Management Systems.

== History ==
Colin Day founded ICIMS in 2000. In August 2018, Vista Equity Partners acquired the company.

Steve Lucas was named CEO in 2020. Brian Provost served as CEO from December 2022 to August 2023. Jason Edelboim was named CEO in January 2024. In May 2026, ICIMS appointed Marc Thompson as chief executive officer, succeeding Jason Edelboim.

In August 2024, ICIMS announced a restructuring initiative focused on artificial intelligence, research and development, and customer experience. They currently had dozens of open roles across their global office locations including New Jersey, Dublin, Paris, London and India.

In March 2026, the company launched ICIMS Frontline AI (now ICIMS High Volume Hiring), a hiring platform for frontline workforce recruitment that incorporates automation tools for candidate screening, interview scheduling, and onboarding processes.

=== Products ===
Core hiring and management products:

- ICIMS Hire: Applicant Tracking System (ATS), text recruiting, onboarding, high volume hiring, offer management
- ICIMS Engage: Candidate Relationship Management (CXM)
- ICIMS Employer Branding: Career sites, recruitment chatbot, employee testimonial videos

AI solutions:

- ICIMS Coalesce AI

=== Market Validation ===
Its TAS products are ICIMS Applicant Tracking, ICIMS High Volume Hiring and ICIMS Candidate Experience Management (CXM).

By the end of 2026, its plan is to enhance its high volume hiring with deeper ICIMS ATS integration. It also plans to upgrade its interview agent to automate self-scheduling, transcription and feedback summarization.

ICIMS holds the #1 market share for the global ATS software market, according to Apps Run the World.

== Acquisitions ==
ICIMS acquired TextRecruit in 2018.

In 2019, ICIMS purchased Jibe for an undisclosed amount.

ICIMS acquired Dublin, Ireland-based Opening.io in May 2020. In November of that year, EasyRecrue was purchased, and a month later, in December, the company acquired Altru for a reported $60 million.

In 2022, the company acquired SkillSurvey and Candidate.ID.

In 2025, the company acquired Apli Inc for an undisclosed amount.
