= Jackie Jones Mountain =

Mountain in New York, United States

- Location within New York Location within the United States

Highest point
- Elevation: 1,253 feet (382 m)
- Coordinates: 41°13′26″N 74°04′15″W

Geography
- Location: W of Stony Point, Rockland County, New York, U.S.
- Topo map: USGS Thiells

Jackie Jones Mountain is a 1,253-foot-tall (382 m) mountain in the state of New York. It is located west of Stony Point in Rockland County. In 1928, a 60-foot-tall (18 m) steel fire lookout tower was built on the mountain. The tower ceased fire lookout operations at the end of the 1988 fire lookout season, and was officially closed in early 1989. The tower is listed on the National Historic Lookout Register, and is open to the public.

== History ==
In 1928, the Palisades State Park Commission built a 60-foot-tall (18 m) steel fire lookout tower on the mountain, to replace the wood tower previously built on the mountain. In 1931, the Conservation Department took over operation of the fire tower. The tower ceased fire lookout operations at the end of the 1988 fire lookout season. It was officially closed by the New York State Department of Environmental Conservation in early 1989. In 2019, the tower was restored by the Forest Fire Lookout Association, Team Rubicon, and the Park. The tower is listed on the National Historic Lookout Register, and is open to the public.
