= Apachita (Potosí) =

Mountain in Bolivia

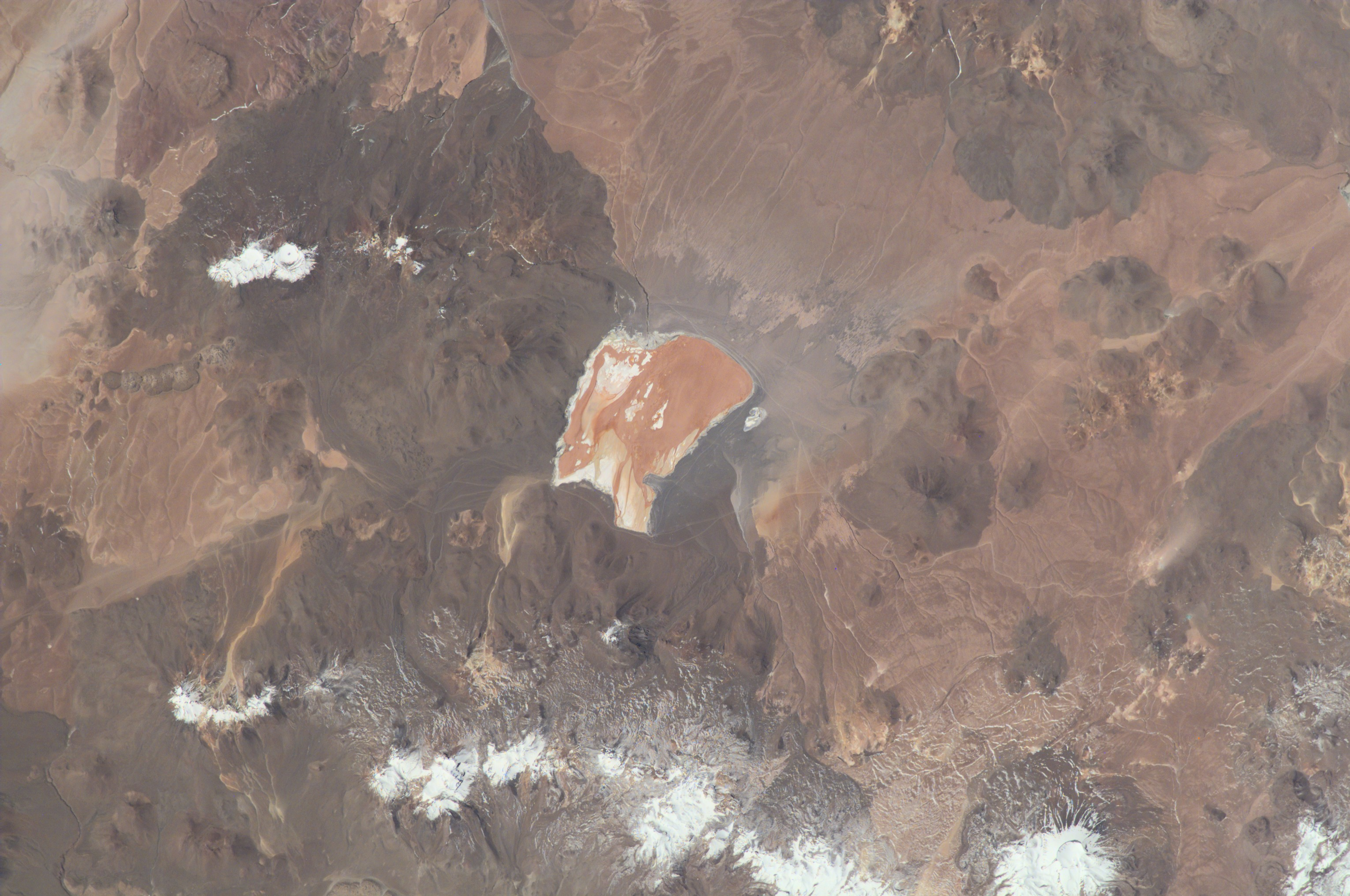
- Laguna Colorada and Apachita (lower right) as seen from the ISS (North is to the upper left part of this image.)

Highest point
- Coordinates: 22°26′39″S 67°47′28″W

Geography
- Location within Bolivia
- Location: Bolivia, Potosí Department, Sur Lípez Province
- Parent range: Andes, Cordillera Occidental

Apachita (Aymara for the place of transit of an important pass in the principal routes of the Andes; name for a stone cairn in the Andes, a little pile of rocks built along the trail in the high mountains, also spelled Apacheta) is a mountain in the Cordillera Occidental in the Bolivian Andes. It is located in the Potosí Department, Sur Lípez Province, San Pablo de Lípez Municipality, near the Chilean border. Apachita lies within the borders of the Eduardo Avaroa Andean Fauna National Reserve. It is situated east of Michina.
