= Luru Mayu Lake =

Lake in Bolivia

- Loromayu Lake
- Location within Bolivia Location within South America
- Interactive map of Luru Mayu Lake
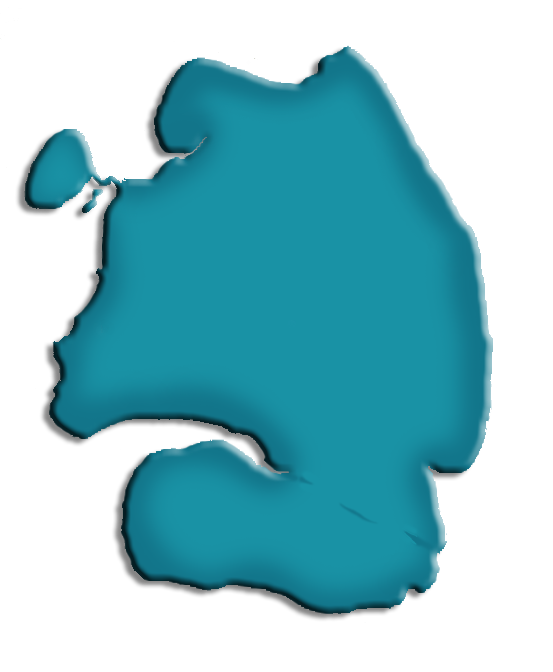
- Location: Potosí Department
- Coordinates: 22°24′40″S 67°12′40″W
- Basin countries: Bolivia
- Surface area: 12 km^{2} (4.6 sq mi)
- Surface elevation: 4,666 m (15,308 ft)

Luru Mayu Lake (Quechua luru pip, mayu river, "pip river", Hispanicized spelling Loromayu) is a lake in Bolivia located in the Potosí Department, Sud Lípez Province, San Pablo de Lípez Municipality. At an elevation of 4,666 m, its surface area is 12 km^{2}. It lies in the Eduardo Avaroa Andean Fauna National Reserve, northwest of a mountain called Luru Mayu. The lake is named after a river which originates in the mountains south and southeast of the lake.
