= Mojinete =

- Location in Bolivia
- Coordinates: 21°45′54″S 66°14′20″W
- Country: Bolivia
- Department: Potosí Department
- Province: Sur Lípez Province
- Municipality: Mojinete Municipality
- Canton: Mojinete Canton

Population (2001)
  - Total: 271
- Instituto Nacional de Estadística Bolivia (INE) 2001
- Time zone: UTC-4 (BOT)

Mojinete is a town in Sur Lipez Province in the Potosí Department of southern Bolivia. It is the capital of Mojinete Municipality and seat of Mojinete Canton.
