= Mount Nelly =

Mountain in Bolivia

Nelly
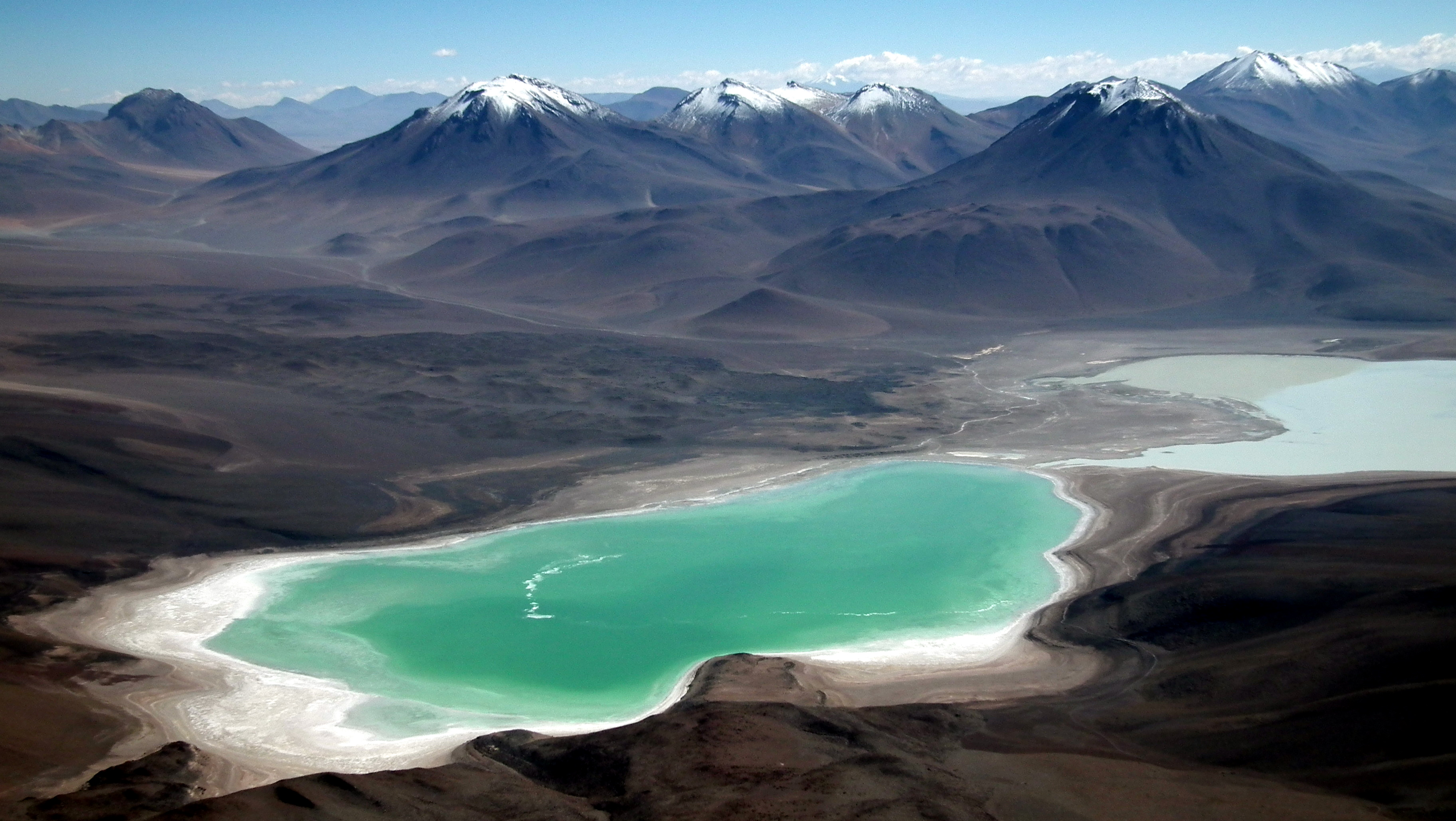
- Laguna Verde and Laguna Blanca in front of Mount Nelly (on the left, snow covered) and Mount Laguna Verde (on the right) as seen from the peak of Licancabur

Highest point
- Elevation: 5,676 m (18,622 ft)
- Coordinates: 22°41′55″S 67°45′17″W

Geography
- Location within Bolivia
- Location: Bolivia, Potosí Department, Sur Lípez Province, San Pablo de Lípez Municipality, Quetena Grande Canton
- Parent range: Andes, Cordillera Occidental

Geology
- Mountain type: Stratovolcano

Nelly (Spanish Cerro Nelly) is a stratovolcano in the Andes located in the Cordillera Occidental of Bolivia, about 5,676 m (18,622 ft) high. It is situated within the Eduardo Avaroa Andean Fauna National Reserve, north east of the Licancabur volcano, Laguna Verde and Laguna Blanca and next to Mount Laguna Verde in the Potosí Department, Sur Lípez Province, San Pablo de Lípez Municipality, Quetena Grande Canton.

== See also ==
- List of mountains in the Andes
- Laguna Celeste
- Laguna Colorada
- Laguna Hedionda
- Uturunku
