= Sanawrya =

Mountain in Bolivia

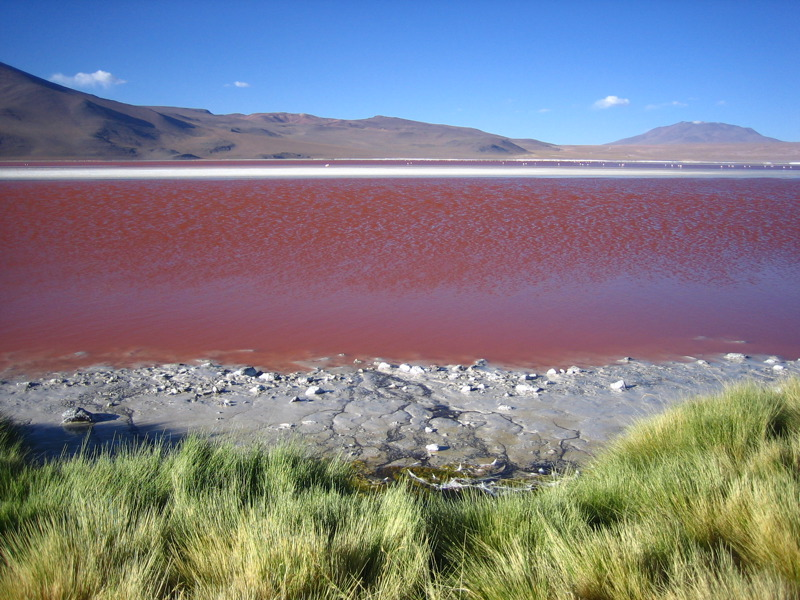
- Laguna Colorada ("colored lake") as seen from the south with Sanawrya in the background (on the right)

Highest point
- Elevation: 5,654 m (18,550 ft)
- Coordinates: 22°07′24″S 67°32′32″W

Geography
- Location within Bolivia
- Location: Bolivia; Potosí Department
- Parent range: Andes

Sanawrya (Quechua for carrot (from Spanish zanahoria), also spelled Sanabria) is a 5,654-metre-high (18,550 ft) mountain in Bolivia. It is located in the Potosí Department, Sud Lípez Province, San Pablo de Lípez Municipality. It lies in the Eduardo Avaroa Andean Fauna National Reserve, northeast of Laguna Colorada.
