= Q'illu Urqu (Sud Lípez) =

Mountain in Bolivia

- Location within Bolivia

Highest point
- Elevation: 4,526 m (14,849 ft)
- Coordinates: 21°53′03″S 66°42′17″W

Geography
- Location: Bolivia, Potosí Department, Sud Lípez Province
- Parent range: Andes

Q'illu Urqu (Quechua q'illu yellow, urqu mountain, "yellow mountain", also spelled Khellu Orkho) is a 4,526-metre-high (14,849 ft) mountain in the Andes of Bolivia. It is situated in the Potosí Department, Sud Lípez Province, San Pablo de Lípez Municipality. Q'illu Urqu lies south-west of the mountain Ch'aska Urqu and north-east of the mountain Palti Urqu. The river Qaqa Pallqa flows along its western slope.
