= Sur Lípez Province =

Province in Potosí Department, Bolivia

Sur Lípez / Sud Lípez
- Province
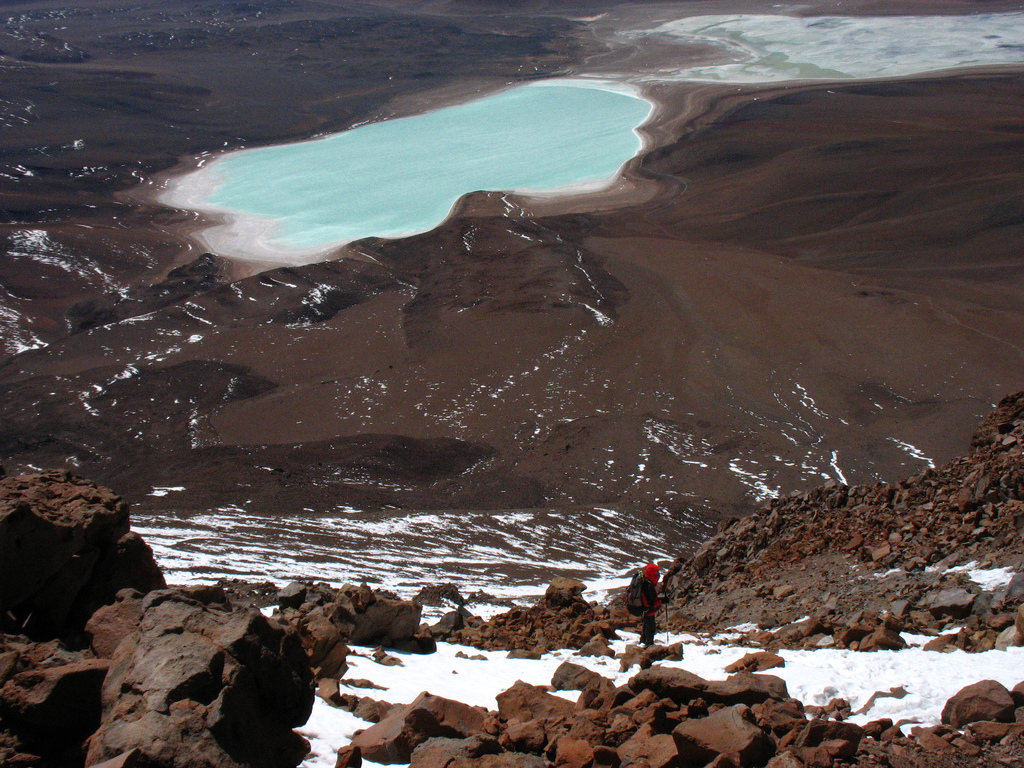
- Laguna Verde and Laguna Blanca as seen from Licancabur, Sud Lípez Province

- Flag Coat of arms

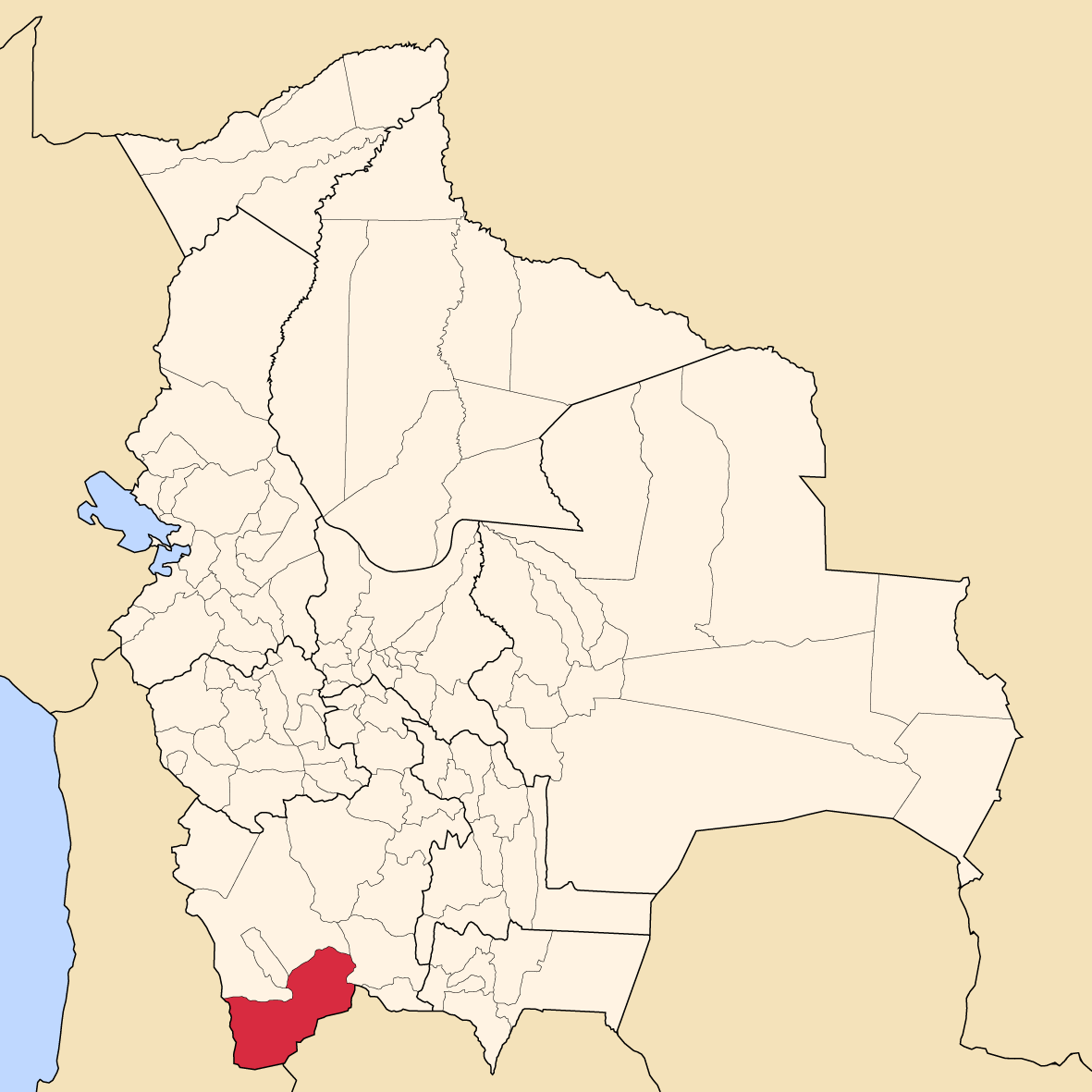
- Location of the Sud Lípez Province within Bolivia

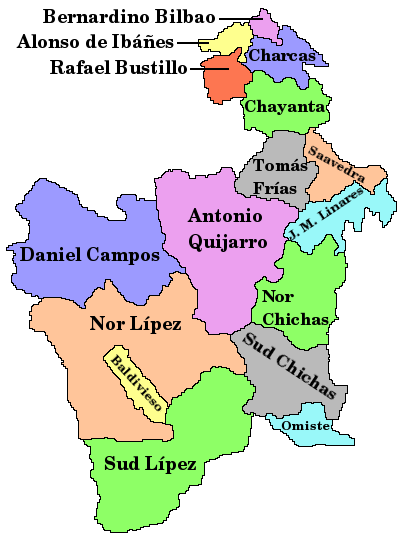
- Provinces of the Potosí Department
- Coordinates: 22°04′0″S 67°07′0″W
- Country: Bolivia
- Department: Potosí Department
- Capital: San Pablo

Area
  - Total: 8,631 sq mi (22,355 km^{2})

Population (2024)
  - Total: 6,099
  - Density: 0.7066/sq mi (0.2728/km^{2})
  - Ethnicities: Quechua
- Time zone: UTC-4 (BOT)

Sur Lípez or Sud Lípez is a province in the Potosí Department in Bolivia. The seat of the province is San Pablo de Lípez.

== Location ==
Sur Lípez is one of sixteen provinces in the Potosí Department. Also, the southwesternmost point of Bolivia is located here, at 22° 49' 41.016" South, 67° 52' 35.004" West, at an elevation of approximately 5,400 m on the northeastern slope of the Licancabur volcano.

It is bordered by the Nor Lípez Province in the north and northwest, Enrique Baldivieso Province in the west, the Republic of Chile in the southwest and south, the Republic of Argentina in the southeast and east, and Sud Chichas Province in the northeast.

The province extends from the northeast to the southwest, at a length of 230 km and an average width of 100 km.

== Geography ==
In its southwestern part, the Quetena Grande Canton lies in the Eduardo Avaroa Andean Fauna National Reserve, the province has a couple of lakes and salt pans, the largest being Laguna Colorada, which is 10 km in diameter at an elevation of 4,278 m. Other lakes, such as Laguna Verde, Laguna Blanca, and Laguna Celeste are also well known for their respectively green, white and blue colors. There is a geyser field called "Sol de Mañana" (Spanish for "Morning Sun") in southwestern Sur Lípez.

The Cordillera de Lípez traverses the province. The highest mountain of the province is Uturunku at 6,008 m (19,711 ft). Other mountains are listed below:

- Apachita
- Ch'aska Urqu
- Ch'iqlla
- Ch'iqu
- Jarellón
- Juriques
- Kuntur Wasi
- Linzor
- Lípez
- Luru Mayu
- Michina
- Muruq'u
- Nelly
- Nina Urqu
- P'aqu Urqu
- Qhawana
- Quetena
- Quli Urqu
- Q'illu Salli
- Q'illu Urqu
- Sanawrya
- Sapaliri
- Suni K'ira
- Suri Phuyu
- T'iyuyuq
- Waqrayuq
- Waylla Jarita
- Yana Urqu
- Yuraq Urqu

The tourist circuit La Ruta de las Joyas Altoandinas passes through the spectacular geography of this area.

== Division ==
The province comprises three municipalities are further subdivided into cantons.

Section	Municipality	Seat
1st	San Pablo de Lípez Municipality	San Pablo de Lípez
2nd	Mojinete Municipality	Mojinete
3rd	San Antonio de Esmoruco Municipality	San Antonio de Esmoruco

== Population ==
The population increased from 4,158 (1992 census) to 4,905 inhabitants (2001 census), an increase of 18%.

99.4% of the population have no access to electricity, and 90% have no sanitary facilities. 69% of the population is employed in agriculture, 4% in mining, 4% in industry, and 23% in general services. 86% of the population are Catholics, 9% are Protestants.

The people are predominantly indigenous citizens of Quechua descent.

Ethnic group	San Pablo de Lípez Municipality (%)	Mojinete Municipality (%)	San Antonio de Esmoruco Municipality (%)
Quechua	81.5	98.3	88.4
Aymara	0.8	1.0	0.5
Guaraní, Chiquitos, Moxos	0.0	0.0	0.0
Not indigenous	17.5	0.37	10.9
Other indigenous groups	0.1	0.0	0.02

== Languages ==
The languages spoken in the province are mainly Spanish and Quechua.

Language	San Pablo de Lípez Municipality	Mojinete Municipality	San Antonio de Esmoruco Municipality
Quechua	1,722	595	1,344
Aymara	24	3	9
Guaraní	0	0	1
Another native	0	0	1
Spanish	2,043	571	1,315
Foreign	9	0	0
Only native	313	95	204
Native and Spanish	1,419	503	1,146
Only Spanish	624	68	169

== See also ==
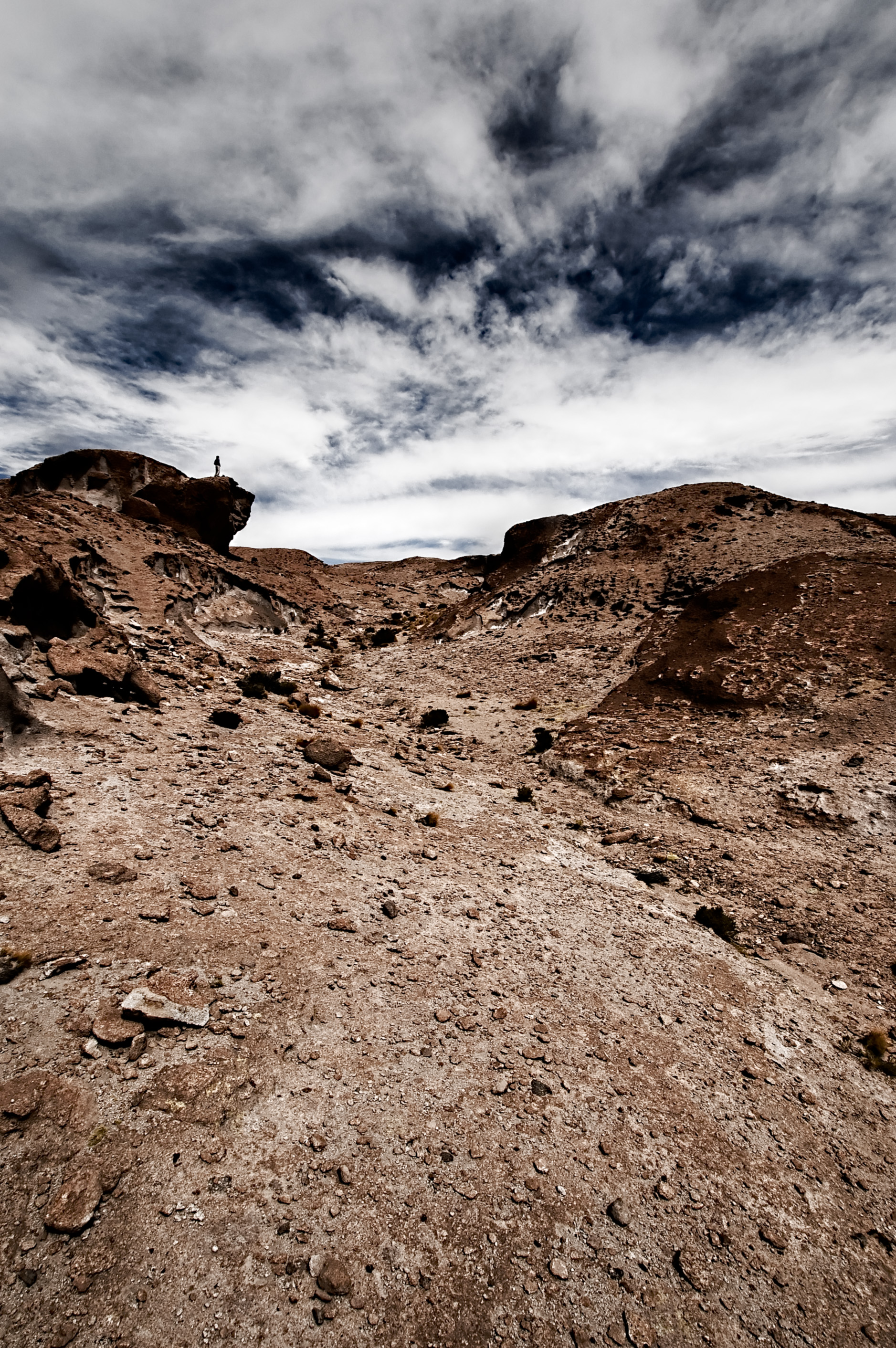
A view of the Sur Lipez desert

- Árbol de Piedra
- Coruto Lake or Caruta Lake
- Laguna Hedionda
- Laguna Honda
- Kalina Lake
- Luru Mayu Lake
- Wilama
- Sapaliri
