= Luru Mayu =

Mountain in Bolivia

- Location within Bolivia

Highest point
- Elevation: 5,888 m (19,318 ft)
- Coordinates: 22°29′07″S 67°06′21″W

Geography
- Location: Bolivia; Potosí Department
- Parent range: Andes

Luru Mayu (Quechua luru pip, mayu river, "pip river", Hispanicized spellings Loro Mayu, Loromayu) is a 5,888-metre-high (19,318 ft) mountain in Bolivia. It is located in the Potosí Department, Sud Lípez Province, San Pablo de Lípez Municipality. It lies in the Eduardo Avaroa Andean Fauna National Reserve, southeast of a lake named Luru Mayu.
