= T'iyuyuq =

Mountain in Bolivia

- Location within Bolivia

Highest point
- Elevation: 5,015 m (16,453 ft)
- Coordinates: 22°00′18″S 67°00′19″W

Geography
- Location: Bolivia; Potosí Department
- Parent range: Andes

T'iyuyuq (Quechua t'iyu sand, -yuq a suffix, "the one with sand", also spelled Thiuyoj) is a 5,015-metre-high (16,453 ft) mountain in Bolivia. It is located in the Potosí Department, Sud Lípez Province, San Pablo de Lípez Municipality. It lies southeast of Lípez and east of Suni K'ira.
