= San Pablo de Lípez Municipality =

San Pablo de Lípez
- Municipality
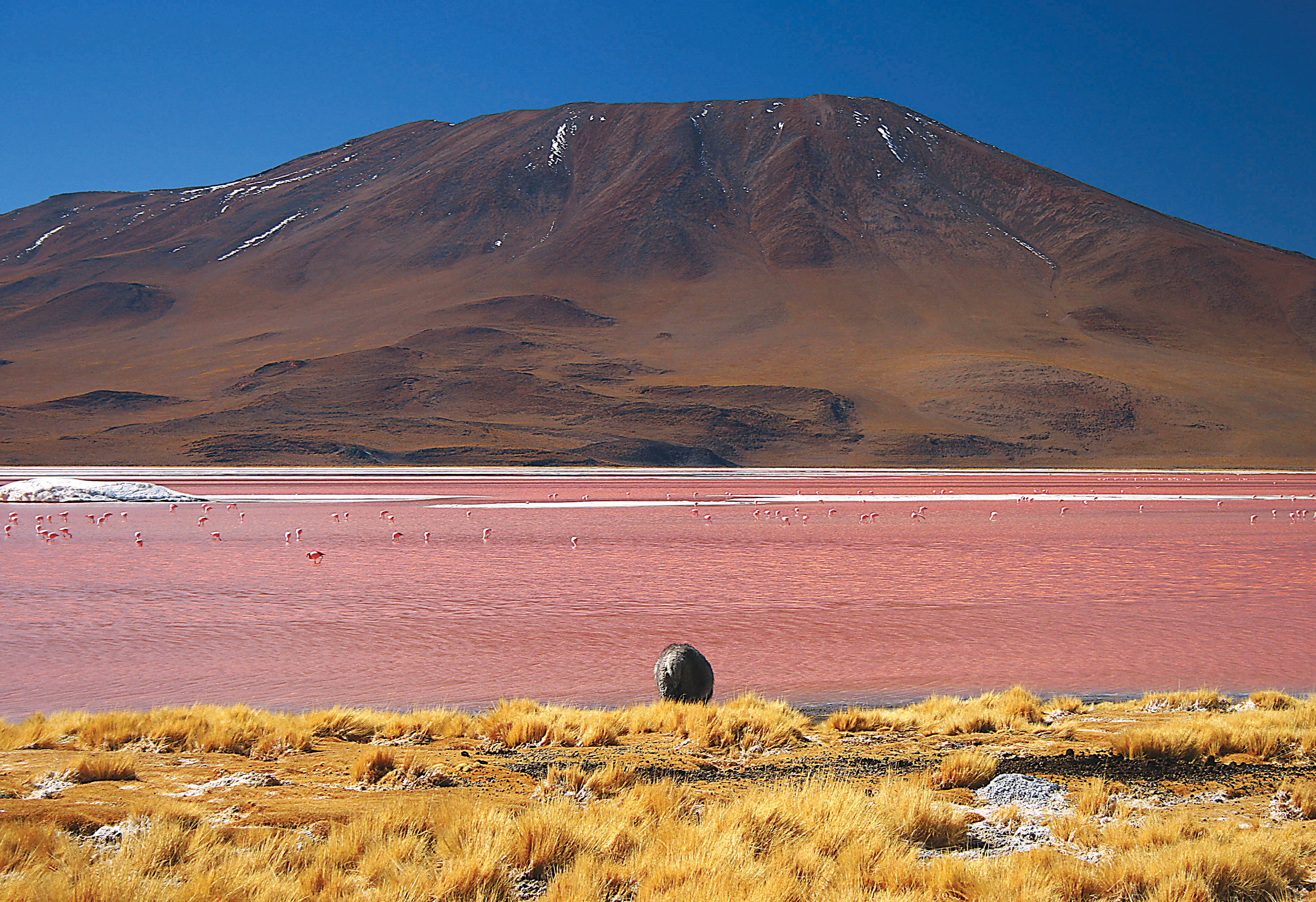
- Laguna Colorada, Quetena Grande

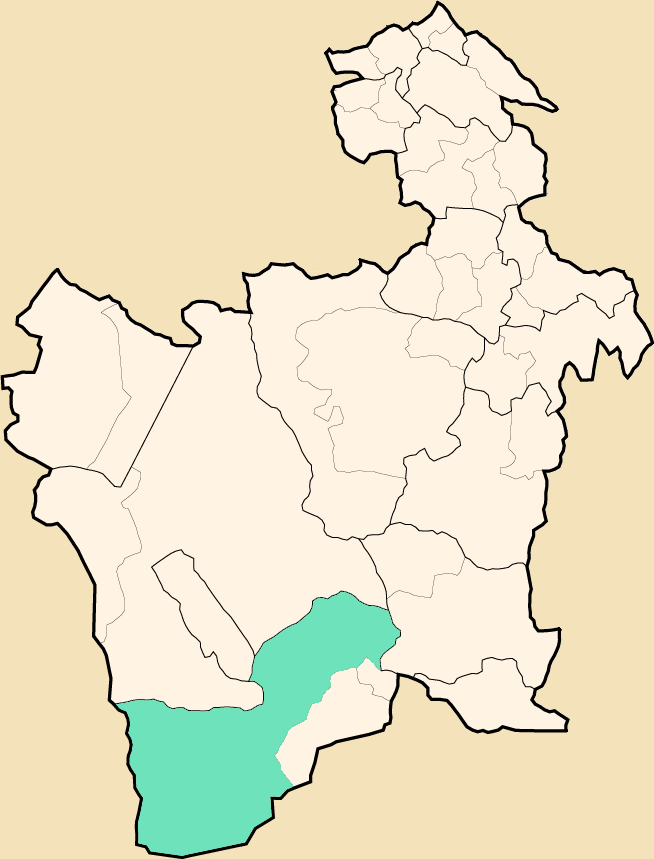
- Location within Potosí Department

- Location within Bolivia
- Coordinates: 22°7′S 67°12′W
- Country: Bolivia
- Department: Potosí Department
- Province: Sur Lípez Province
- Seat: San Pablo de Lípez
- Elevation: 14,400 ft (4,400 m)

Population (2001)
  - Total: 2,523
  - Ethnicities: Quechua
- Time zone: UTC-4 (-4)

San Pablo de Lípez Municipality is the first municipal section of the Sur Lípez Province in the Potosí Department in Bolivia. Its seat is San Pablo de Lípez.

== Geography ==
The highest mountain of the municipality is Uturunku at 6,008 m (19,711 ft). Other mountains are listed below:

- Apachita
- Ch'aska Urqu
- Ch'iqlla
- Ch'iqu
- Kuntur Wasi
- Luru Mayu
- Michina
- Nelly
- P'aqu Urqu
- Qhawana
- Quetena
- Quli Urqu
- Q'illu Salli
- Q'illu Urqu
- Sanawrya
- Sapaliri
- Suni K'ira
- Suri Phuyu
- T'iyuyuq
- Waylla Jarita
- Yana Urqu
- Yuraq Urqu

== Subdivision ==
The municipality consists of the following cantons:

- Quetena Grande - 621 inhabitants (2001)
- San Antonio de Lípez - 505 inhabitants
- San Pablo de Lípez - 1,397 inhabitants

== The people ==
The people are predominantly indigenous citizens of Quechua descent.

Ethnic group	%
Quechua	81.5
Aymara	0.8
Guaraní, Chiquitos, Moxos	0.0
Not indigenous	17.5
Other indigenous groups	0.1
