= Ch'aska Urqu =

Ch'aska Urqu may refer to the following:

- Ch'aska Urqu (Nor Lípez)
- Ch'aska Urqu (Sud Lípez)
