= Mojinete Canton =

Mojinete
- Canton
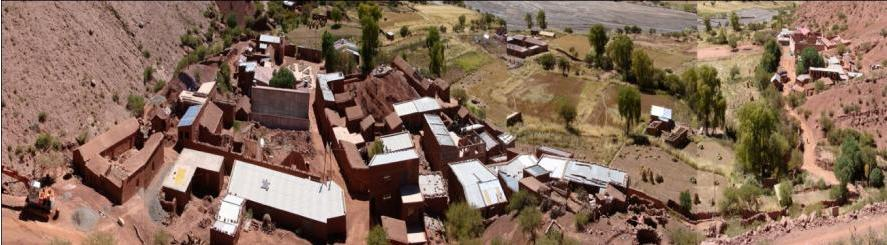

- Location of Mojinete within Bolivia
- Coordinates: 21°46′S 66°14′W
- Country: Bolivia
- Department: Potosí Department
- Province: Sur Lípez Province
- Municipality: Mojinete Municipality
- Seat: Mojinete

Population (2001)
  - Total: 376
- Time zone: UTC-4 (BST)

Mojinete is one of the cantons of the Mojinete Municipality, the second municipal section of the Sur Lípez Province in the Potosí Department of Bolivia. During the census of 2001 it had 376 inhabitants. Its seat is Mojinete with a population of 271 in 2001.
