= Kalina Lake =

Lake in Bolivia

Kalina Lake Busch Lake
- Location within Bolivia Location within South America
- Interactive map of Kalina Lake; Busch Lake
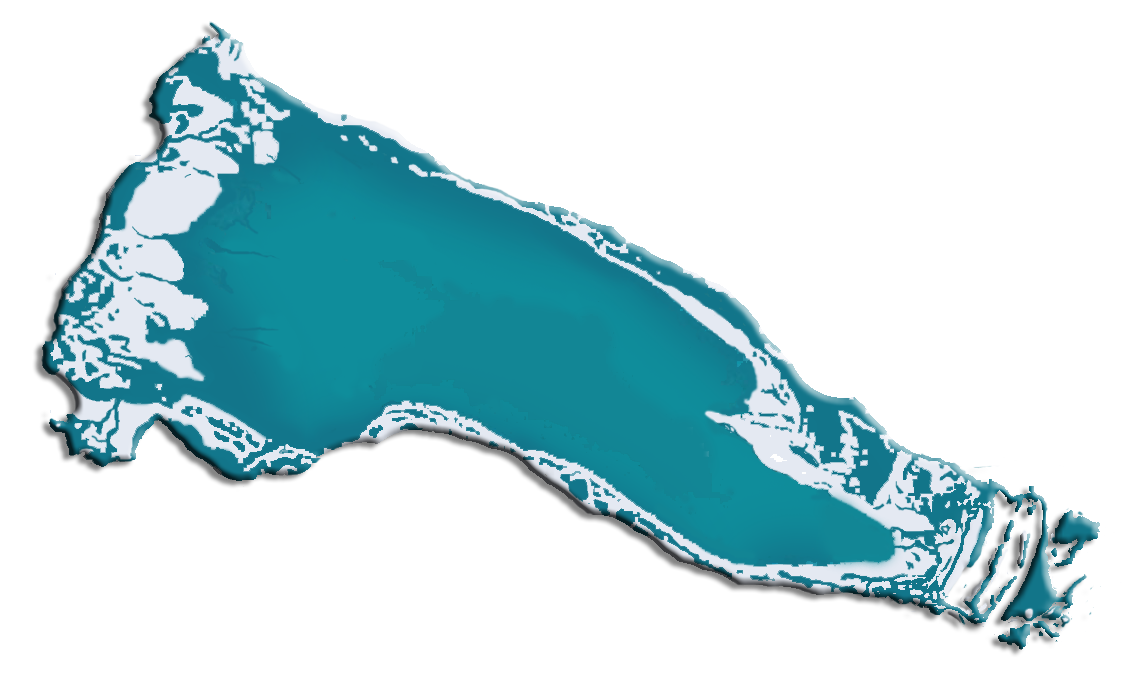
- Map
- Location: Sur Lípez Province, Potosí Department
- Coordinates: 22°36′38″S 67°12′20″W
- Basin countries: Bolivia
- Surface area: 20.6 km^{2} (8.0 sq mi)
- Surface elevation: 4,525 m (14,846 ft)

Kalina Lake or Busch Lake is a lake in the Sur Lípez Province, Potosí Department, Bolivia. At an elevation of 4,525 m (14,846 ft), its surface area is 20.6 km^{2}.
