= Zapaleri Lake =

Lake in Bolivia

- Location within Bolivia Location within South America
- Interactive map of Zapaleri Lake
- Location: Sur Lípez Province, Potosí Department
- Coordinates: 22°44′S 67°11′W
- Basin countries: Bolivia
- Surface area: 2 km^{2} (0.77 sq mi)
- Surface elevation: 4,608 m (15,118 ft)

Zapaleri Lake is a lake in the Zapaleri mountain, located at the Sur Lípez Province, Potosí Department, Bolivia. At an elevation of 4608 m, its surface area is 2 km².
