= Laguna Hedionda =

Laguna Hedionda may refer to:

- Laguna Hedionda (Sud Lípez), a lake in the mountains of Potosí Department, Bolivia
- Laguna Hedionda (Nor Lípez), a saline lake in the mountains of Nor Lípez Province, Potosí Department, Bolivia
