= Michina =

Mountain in Bolivia

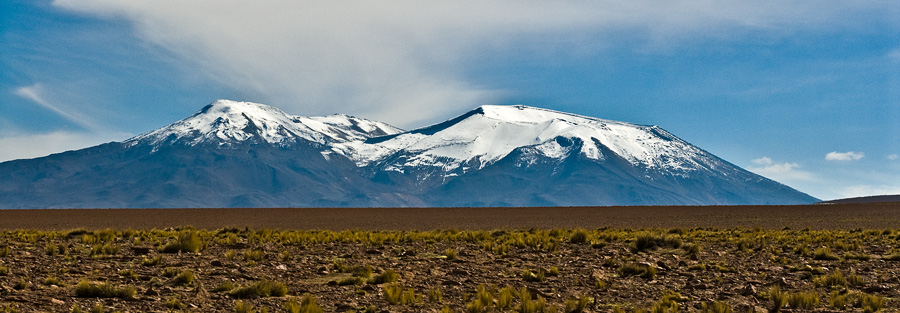
- Tocorpuri (on the left) and Michina as seen from Chile in the west

Highest point
- Elevation: 5,537 m (18,166 ft)
- Coordinates: 22°26′20″S 67°53′15″W

Geography
- Location within Bolivia
- Location: Bolivia, Potosí Department, Sur Lípez Province
- Parent range: Andes, Cordillera Occidental

Michina (Quechua for pasture) is a 5,537-metre-high (18,166 ft) mountain in the Cordillera Occidental in the Bolivian Andes. It is located in the Potosí Department, Sur Lípez Province, San Pablo de Lípez Municipality, at the border with Chile. Michina lies within the borders of the Eduardo Avaroa Andean Fauna National Reserve. It is situated south of Tocorpuri.
