= Mojinete Municipality =

- Municipality
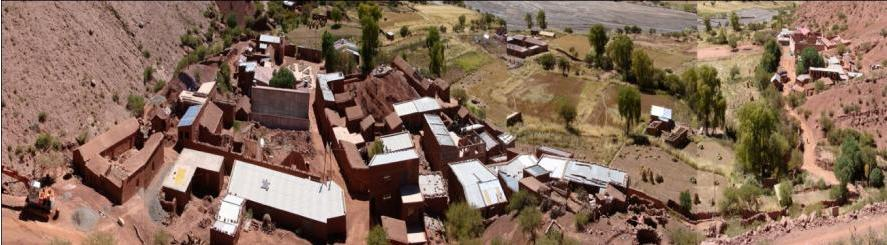
- Mojinete

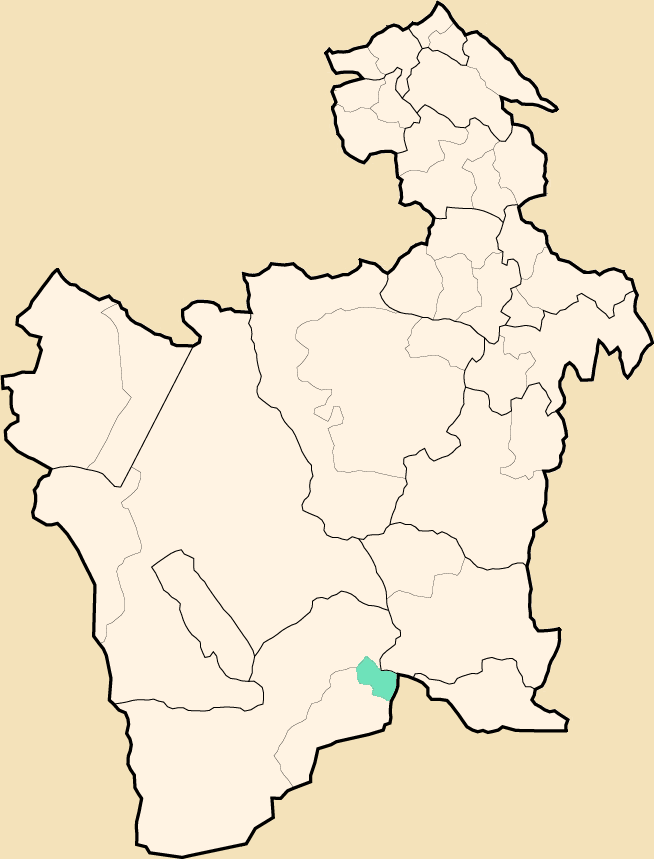
- Location within Potosí Department

- Location within Bolivia
- Coordinates: 21°46′S 66°18′W
- Country: Bolivia
- Department: Potosí Department
- Province: Sur Lípez Province
- Seat: Mojinete
- Elevation: 11,500 ft (3,500 m)

Population (2001)
  - Total: 716
  - Ethnicities: Quechua
- Time zone: UTC-4 (BOT)

Mojinete Municipality is the second municipal section of the Sur Lípez Province in the Potosí Department in Bolivia. Its seat is Mojinete.

== Subdivision ==
The municipality consists of the following cantons:

- Bonete Palca
- Casa Grande
- Mojinete
- Pueblo Viejo
- La Cienega

== The people ==
The people are predominantly indigenous citizens of Quechua descent.

Ethnic group	%
Quechua	98.3
Aymara	1.0
Guaraní, Chiquitos, Moxos	0.0
Not indigenous	0.7
Other indigenous groups	0.0
