= Laguna Celeste =

Lake in Potosí Department, Bolivia

- Location within Bolivia Location within South America
- Interactive map of Laguna Celeste
- Location: Sur Lípez Province, Potosí Department
- Coordinates: 22.2139°S 67.1072°W
- Type: Natural lake colored blue by Magnesium and Manganese
- Basin countries: Bolivia
- Max. length: 2.13 km (1.32 mi)
- Max. width: 0.93 km (0.58 mi)
- Surface area: 2.3 km^{2} (0.89 sq mi)
- Surface elevation: 4,529 m (14,859 ft)

Laguna Celeste is a lake of Bolivia in the Sur Lípez Province, Potosí Department. At an elevation of 4529 m, its surface area is 2.3 km^{2}.
