= Coruto Lake =

Lake in Bolivia

- Caruta Lake
- Location within Bolivia Location within South America
- Interactive map of Coruto Lake
- Location: Sur Lípez Province, Potosí Department
- Coordinates: 22°26′S 67°01′W
- Primary inflows: río Volcán
- Basin countries: Bolivia
- Surface area: 15.8 km^{2} (6.1 sq mi)
- Surface elevation: 4,505 m (14,780 ft)

Coruto Lake or Caruta Lake is a lake in the Sur Lípez Province]l, Potosí Department, Bolivia. At an elevation of 4505 m, its surface area is 15.8 km².
