= Laguna Blanca (Bolivia) =

Lake in Sur Lípez Province, Potosí Department, Bolivia

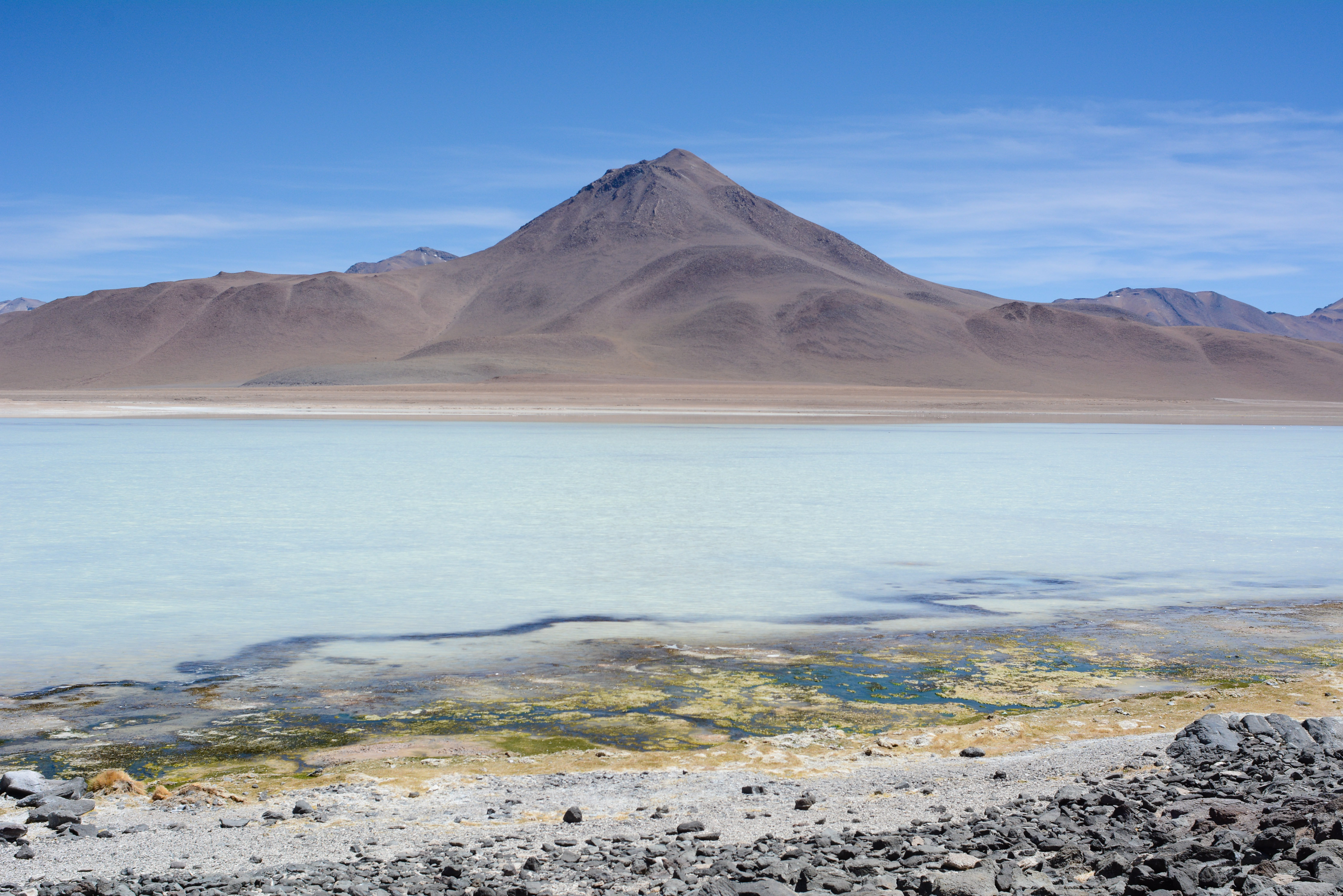
- View of Laguna Blanca

- Location within Bolivia Location within South America
- Interactive map of Laguna Blanca
- Location: Sur Lípez Province, Potosí Department
- Coordinates: 22.800°S 67.794°W
- Basin countries: Bolivia
- Surface area: 10.9 km^{2} (4.2 sq mi)
- Surface elevation: 4,350 m (14,270 ft)

Laguna Blanca is a salt lake in an endorheic basin, in the Sur Lípez Province of the Potosí Department, Bolivia. It is near the Licancabur volcano.

== Geography ==
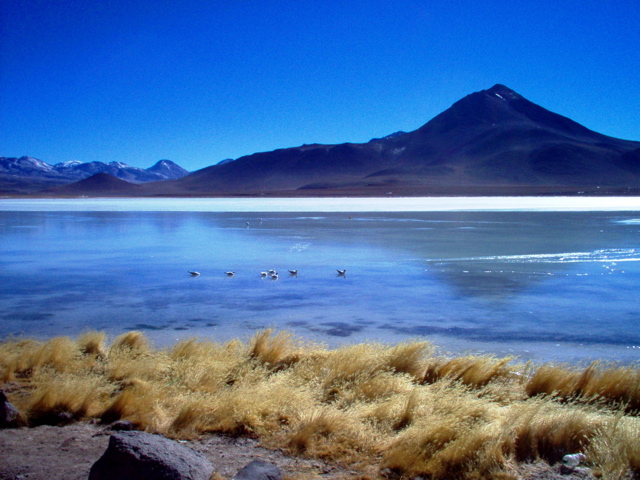
Laguna Blanca with Cerro Laguna Verde in the background

The lake is at an elevation of 4,350 metres (14,270 ft) on the Altiplano. Its surface area is 10.9 km^{2}. The lake is 5.6 kilometres (3.5 mi) long and 3.5 kilometres (2.2 mi) wide.

The characteristic white colour of the water, that gave the lake its name, is caused by the high amount of minerals suspended in it.

Only a narrow corridor separates Laguna Blanca from the smaller Laguna Verde. Both are within the Eduardo Avaroa Andean Fauna National Reserve. In the past, Laguna Blanca was much larger; at least 45 meters higher than today and extending far east past its current shore. Having reached a peak water level 13,240 years before the present, Laguna Verde was then merged with Laguna Blanca.

== See also ==
- Laguna Verde (Bolivia) — a salt lake also in Eduardo Avaroa Andean Fauna National Reserve
- Laguna Colorada — a nearby salt lake notable for its red coloration
- Altiplano region
- Licancabur volcano
- Mount Nelly
