= Jarellón =

Caldera on Chile-Bolivia border

Jarellón is a caldera in the Andes, on the border between Bolivia and Chile which was discovered in 1975.

It has a diameter of 5 kilometres (3.1 mi) and formed during the Pliocene, with one K-Ar date of 3.6 ± 0.1 million years ago. It has erupted dacite and rhyolite. The caldera and the associated stratovolcano of the same name are an important source of obsidian, which forms several large lava flows. This obsidian is known as the Laguna Blanca obsidian or Zapaleri obsidian. This obsidian was traded regionally.
