= Ch'aska Urqu (Sud Lípez) =

Mountain in Bolivia

- Location within Bolivia

Highest point
- Elevation: 4,640 m (15,220 ft)
- Coordinates: 21°51′40″S 66°41′55″W

Geography
- Location: Bolivia, Potosí Department, Sud Lípez Province
- Parent range: Andes

Ch'aska Urqu (Quechua ch'aska tousled / star, urqu mountain, "tousled mountain" or "star mountain", also spelled Chasca Orkho) is a mountain in the Andes of Bolivia, about 4,640 metres (15,223 ft) high. It is situated in the Potosí Department, Sud Lípez Province, San Pablo de Lípez Municipality. Ch'aska Urqu lies west of the mountain Muruq'u and north-east of the mountains Palti Urqu and Q'illu Urqu.
