= Laguna Verde (Bolivia) =

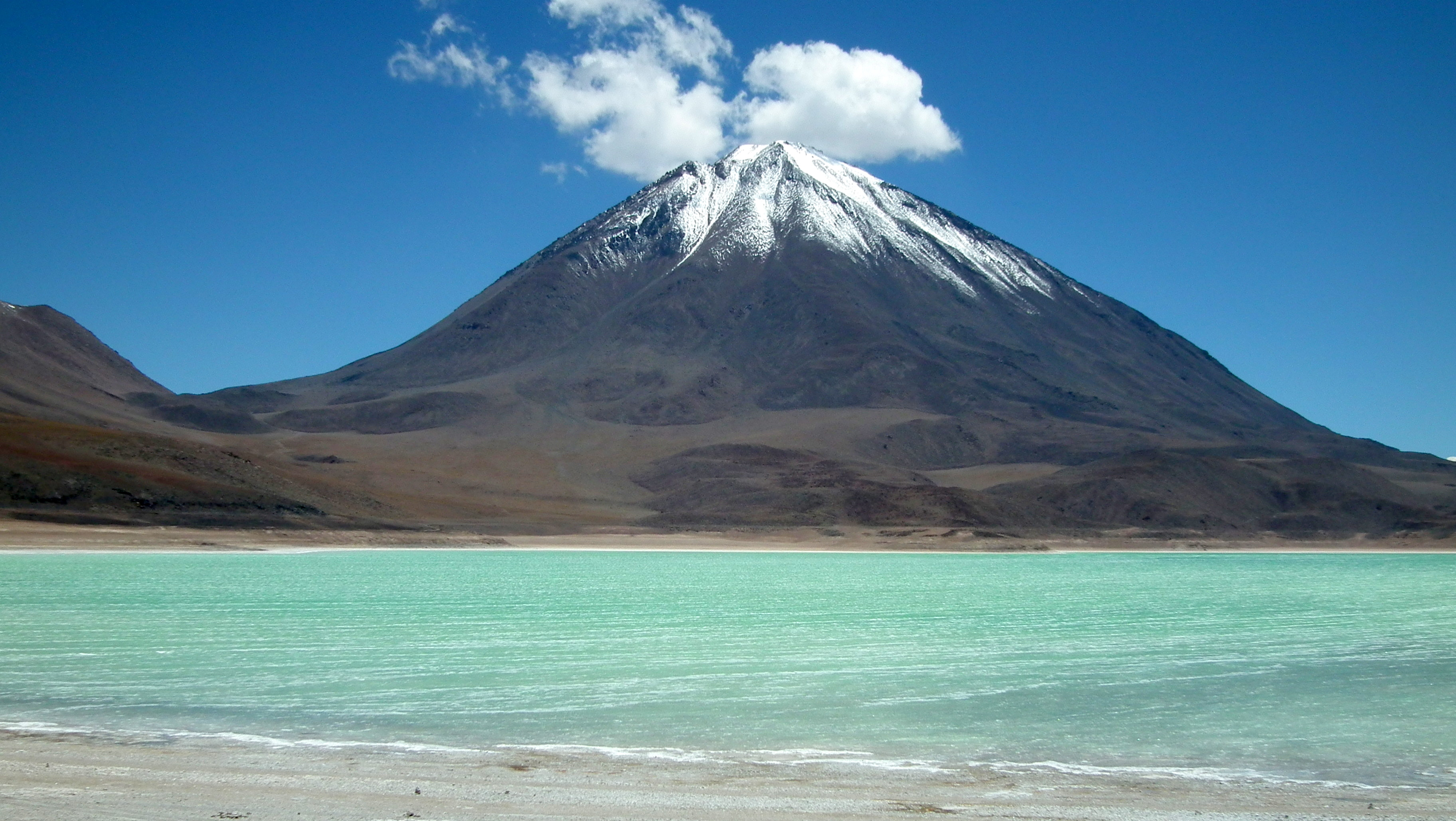
- Laguna Verde with Licancabur volcano in the background

- Location within Bolivia Location within South America
- Interactive map of Laguna Verde
- Location: Altiplano, Sur Lípez Province, Potosí Department
- Coordinates: 22°47′42″S 67°49′30″W
- Type: Salt lake
- Basin countries: Bolivia
- Surface elevation: 4,300 m (14,100 ft)

Laguna Verde (Spanish for "green lake") is a salt lake in an endorheic basin, in the southwestern Altiplano in Bolivia. It is located in the Sur Lípez Province of the Potosí Department. It is close to the Chilean border, at the foot of the volcano Licancabur.

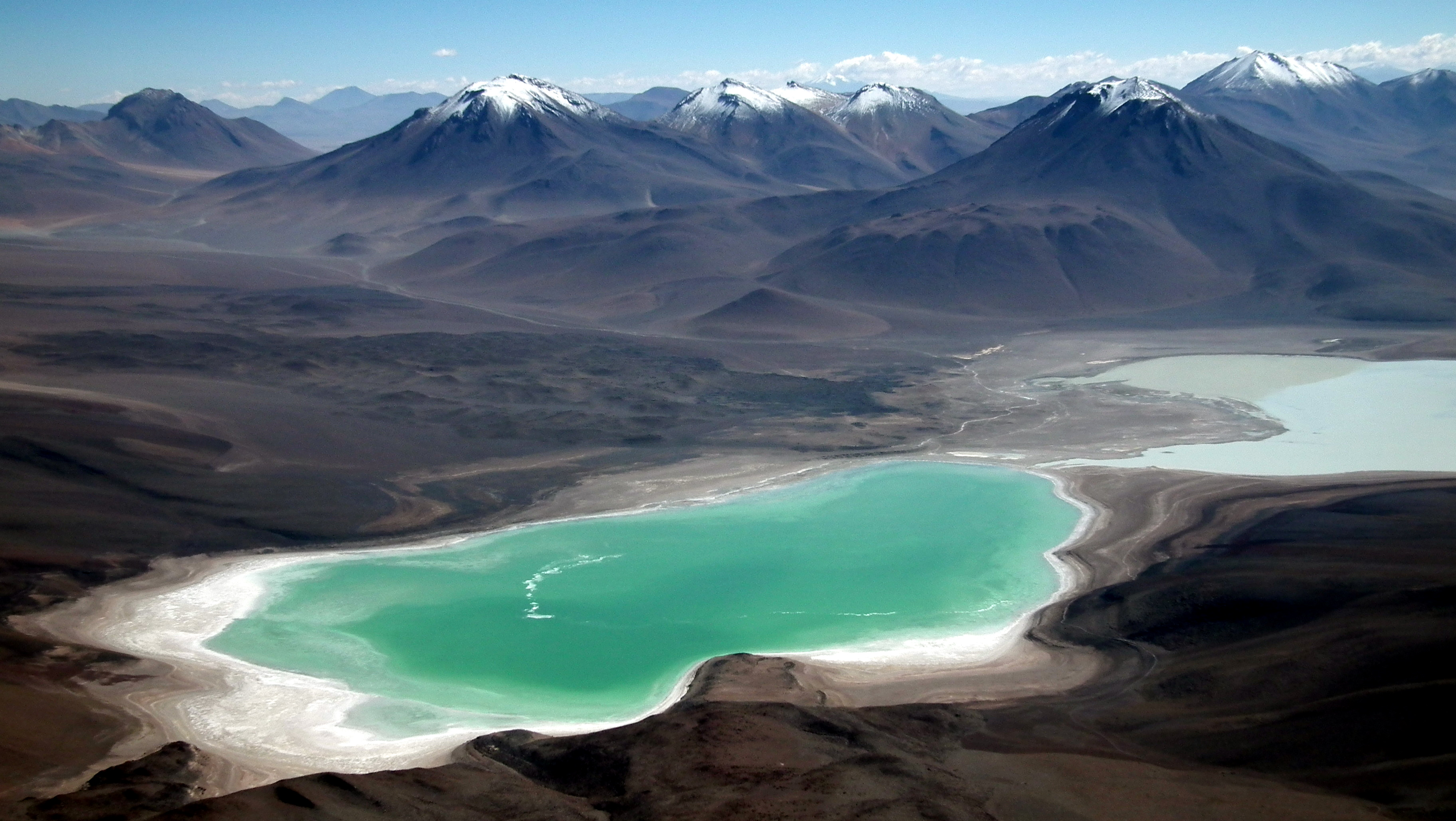
Laguna Verde seen from Licancabur

View from the shore

== Geography ==
The Laguna Verde is a lake at 4,310 metres (14,140 ft) elevation. It covers an area of 7.5 square kilometres (2.9 sq mi) and has a depth of 5.4 metres (18 ft), and a narrow causeway divides it into two parts. It is at the southwestern extremity of the Eduardo Avaroa Andean Fauna National Reserve and Bolivia itself. It has mineral suspensions of arsenic and other minerals which renders colour to the lake waters. Its color varies from turquoise to dark emerald depending on the disturbance caused to sediments in the lake by winds.

In the backdrop of the lake there is the inactive volcano Licancabur of 5,868 metres (19,252 ft) in elevation, which is a nearly perfect cone. The shorelines west and east of the lake have different characteristics, with the western and southern shores eroded into volcanoes. Geothermal heat warms waters that then emerge into Laguna Blanca through springs, the lakes are otherwise fed by snowfall. The catchment of the lake has an area of about 776 square kilometres (300 sq mi).

In the past, the lake was at least 45 metres (148 ft) higher and larger than today, during the Last Glacial Maximum it merged with neighbouring Laguna Blanca. Former highstands have left 30 major and 12 minor shorelines. The lake extended far east of its present-day shore. A maximum water level was reached 13,240 years before present. The two lakes today are only connected by a single channel and their properties are quite different. The lake is seldom ice-covered, water temperatures range between 13–20 °C (55–68 °F). Air temperatures range between 10 – −30 °C (50 – −22 °F), and UV radiation is 40% higher than at sea level. Environmental conditions have been compared to those on the planet Mars, and Laguna Verde has been cited as an example of how a lake on Mars would have evolved.

The lake is one of Bolivia's most important tourism targets. Stromatolites of various shapes and sizes occur at Laguna Verde, they cover an area of over 100 square kilometres (39 sq mi) but are inactive today. Presumably, they grew around 20,000-10,000 years ago. Presently, smaller structures and microbial mats formed by cyanobacteria still occur at Laguna Verde. Mining tailings are found at its shores. The bacterial species Chromohalobacter sarecensis was discovered at Laguna Verde. Despite their connection, Laguna Verde and Laguna Blanca have distinctly different biological and chemical traits.

== See also ==
- Laguna Blanca (Bolivia) — a salt lake also in the Eduardo Avaroa Andean Fauna National Reserve
- Altiplano region
