= Laguna Hedionda (Sud Lípez) =

Lake in Potosí Department, Bolivia

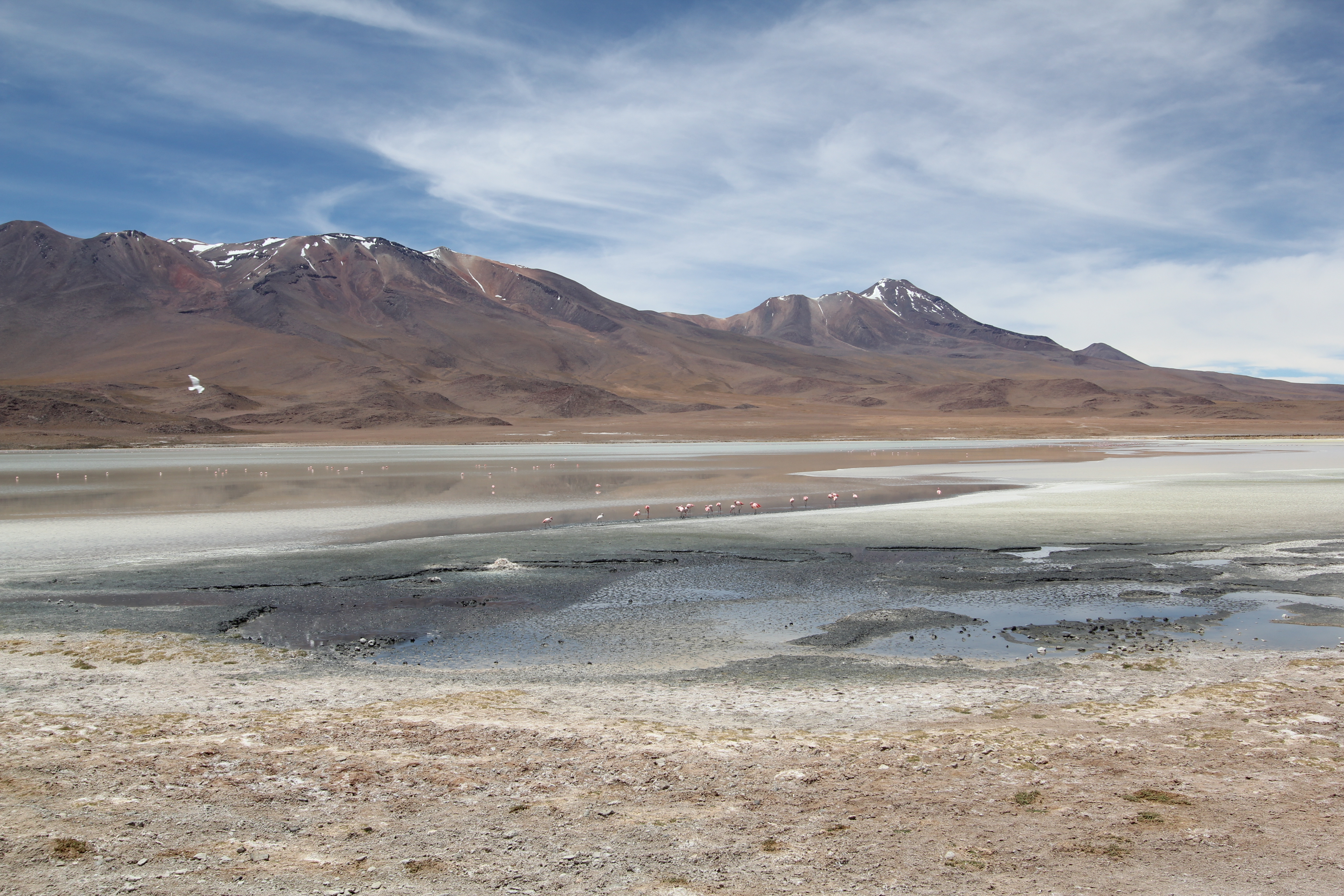
- Hedionda Lake with Cerros de Canapa in the background

- Location within Bolivia Location within South America
- Interactive map of Laguna Hedionda
- Location: Potosí Department
- Coordinates: 22°27′34″S 67°23′13″W
- Basin countries: Bolivia
- Surface area: 3.2 km^{2} (1.2 sq mi)
- Surface elevation: 4,532 m (14,869 ft)

Laguna Hedionda (Spanish for "stinking lake") is a lake in the Potosí Department in Bolivia. At an elevation of 4532 m, its surface area is 3.2 km^{2}.

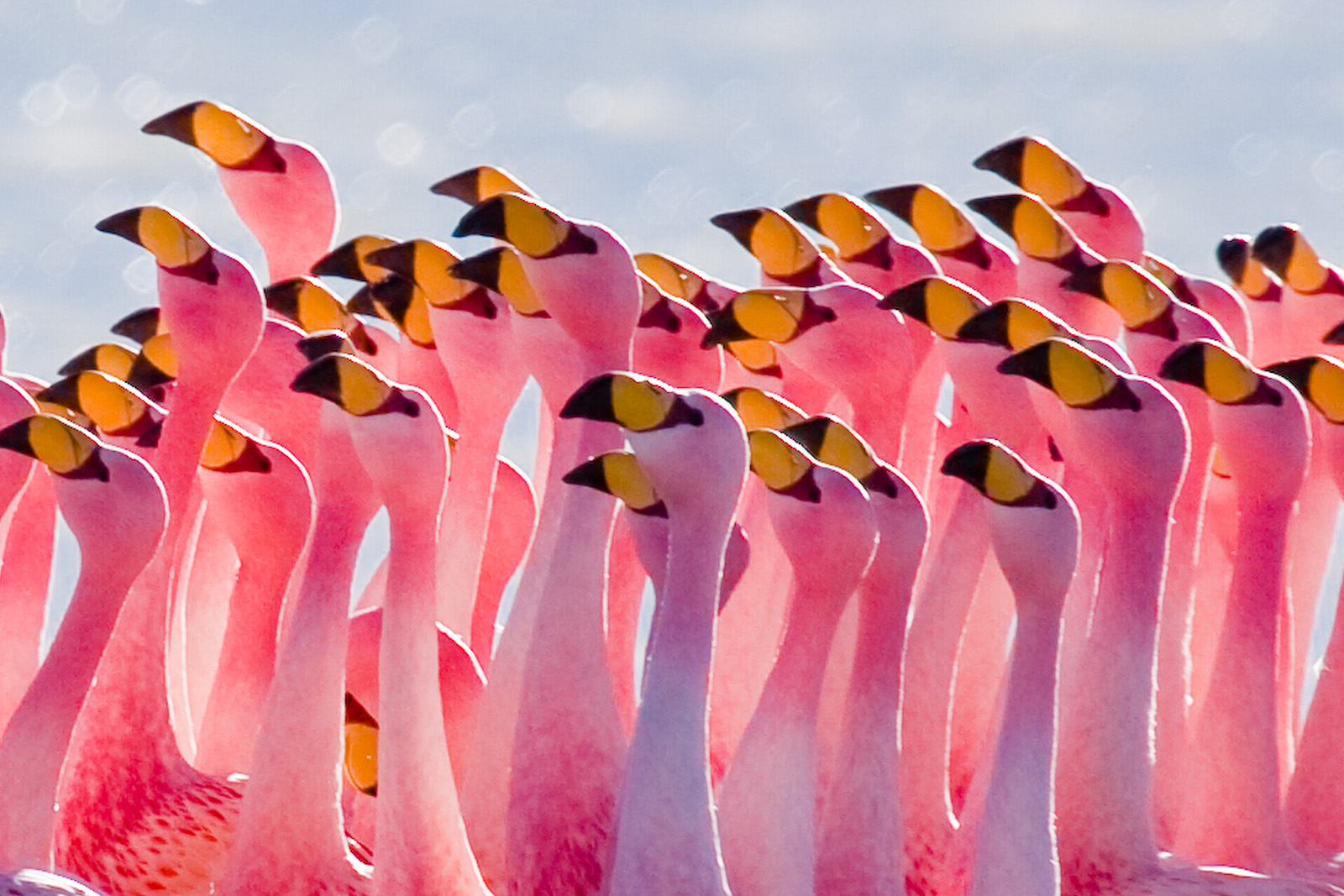
Colorful inhabitants of Laguna Hedionda

== See also ==
- Laguna Hedionda (Nor Lípez) — a larger salt lake in Lípez Province.
- Altiplano region
- Mount Nelly
