= Eduardo Avaroa Andean Fauna National Reserve =

Reserve in Potosí, Bolivia

- IUCN category IV (habitat/species management area)
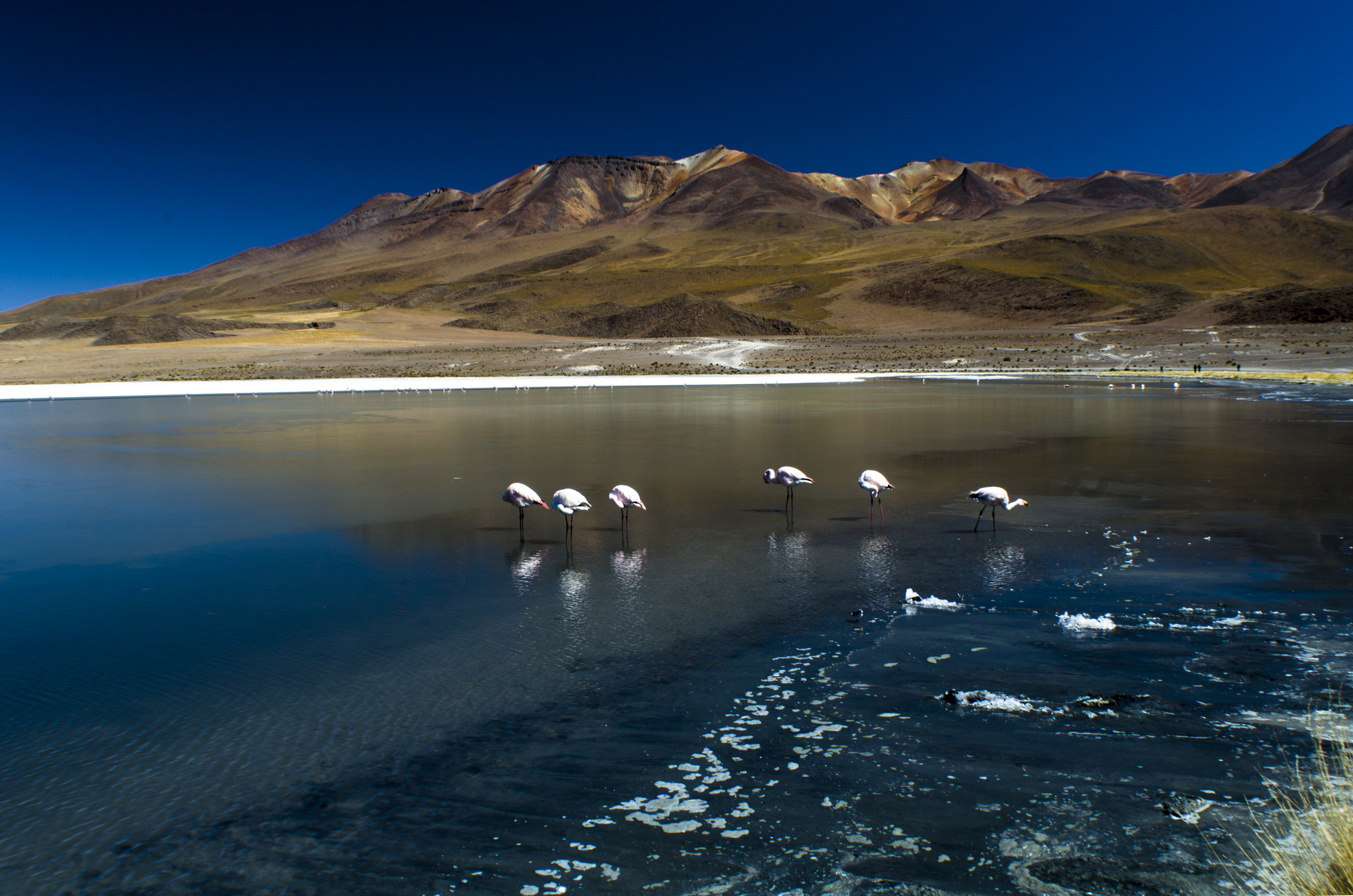
- Laguna Cañapa in the reserve

- Location within Bolivia
- Location: Bolivia; Potosí Department, Sur Lípez Province
- Coordinates: 22°32′06″S 67°39′00″W
- Area: 7,147.45 km^{2} (2,759.65 sq mi)
- Established: 1973
- Visitors: 67,000 (in 2007)
- Governing body: Servicio Nacional de Áreas Protegidas (SERNAP)

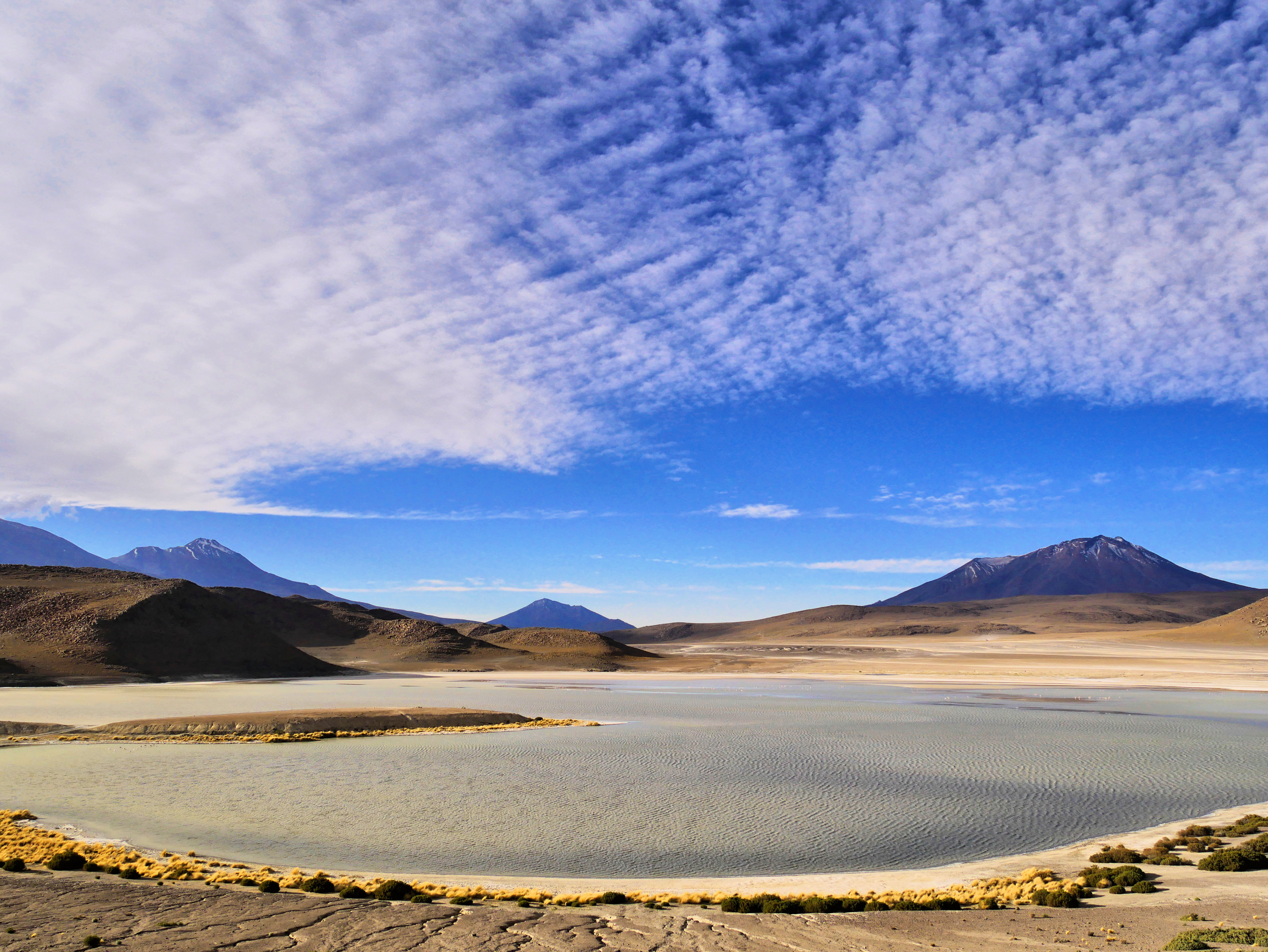
Eduardo Avaroa Andean Fauna National Reserve: Laguna Ramaditas

The Eduardo Avaroa Andean Fauna National Reserve (Spanish: Reserva Nacional de Fauna Andina Eduardo Avaroa) is a protected area located in the Sud Lípez province of the Potosí department, in southwestern Bolivia. It lies within the high Altiplano and the Andes Mountains, at altitudes ranging between 4,200 m (13,800 ft) and 5,400 m (17,700 ft). The reserve was officially established in December 1973 and is named after Eduardo Abaroa, a national hero recognized for his role in the War of the Pacific. It is one of Bolivia’s 60 protected areas and is categorized under IUCN Category IV, primarily for the protection of birds that inhabit the different lagoons. In 2018, it attracted approximately 153,000 visitors, making it the most visited protected area in the country.

Covering 714,745 hectares, the reserve encompasses one of the most extreme and unique environments of the Bolivian altiplano. It is part of the Central Andean dry puna (oligothermic) ecoregion. Its landscape is predominantly mountainous and desert-like, hosting some of the highest volcanoes in southwestern Bolivia near the borders with Argentina and Chile, including Licancabur, Uturuncu, and Ollagüe.

The reserve is also home to Sol de Mañana, a geothermally active area featuring geysers, fumaroles, and hot springs. Notable bodies of water include Laguna Colorada, Laguna Blanca, and Laguna Verde, each distinguished by unique physical, chemical, and color characteristics.

The reserve’s ecosystem is nationally significant due to the presence of species adapted to extreme conditions of altitude, temperature, and limited water availability. Mammal species include vicuñas, guanacos, llamas, and Andean foxes. Its high-altitude lakes host three flamingo species: Andean, James’s, and Chilean flamingos.

== History ==
Established in December of 1973, the national park is named after Eduardo Avaroa (1838–1879), the Bolivian war hero of the 19th century. It was created by Supreme Decree (SD) of 13 December 1973 and extended on May 14, 1981. Since 2009, the entire reserve is part of the larger Los Lípez Ramsar site.

== Geography ==
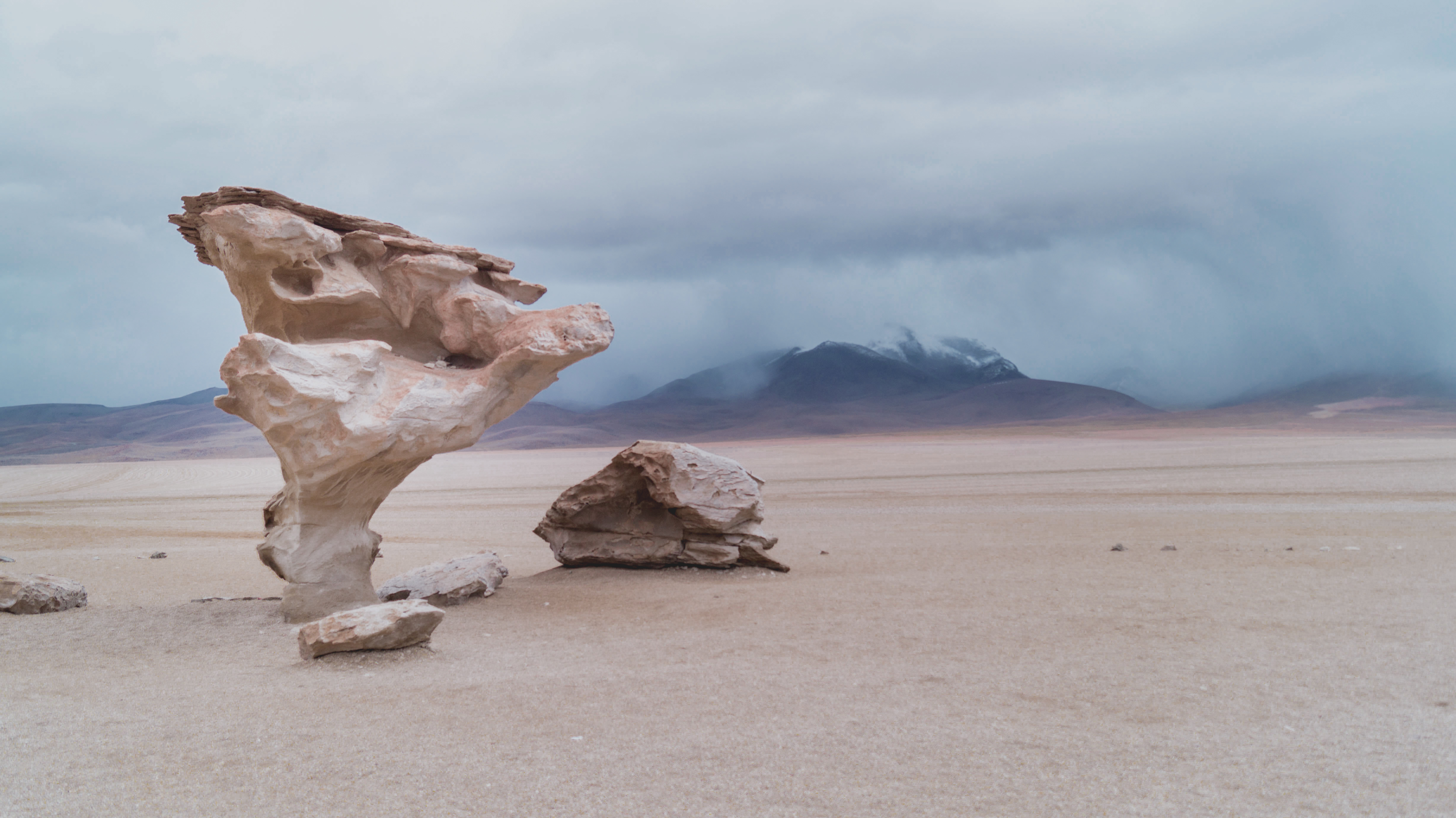
Árbol de Piedra ("Stone Tree"), an unusual rock formation, about 7 meters high, a ventifact carved by wind-blown sand in the Eduardo Avaroa Reserve.

The reserve is situated in the southern region of Andean mountains in southwestern Bolivia. The mountains rise to heights varying from 3,500–5,000 m (11,500–16,400 ft). The basin features depict active volcanoes, hot springs, geysers and fumaroles, and a parallel has been drawn with the Yellowstone National Park in the US. Its water resources are limited to lakes and salt water lagoons due to very low rainfall of 76 mm (3.0 in) annually. Two communities, Quetena Chico and Quetena Grande, lie within the reserve.

Lakes include Laguna Verde, Laguna Colorada, Laguna Salada, Laguna Busch and Laguna Hedionda. Laguna Colorada lies at an altitude of 4,278 m (14,035 ft) and covers 60 km^{2} (23 sq mi). It is named after the effect of wind and sun on the micro-organism that live in it. The lake is very shallow, less than 1 m (3 ft 3 in) deep, and supports some 40 bird species, providing pink algae to population of rare James's flamingoes who can walk across it.

An unusual natural feature of attraction (much photographed) in the reserve is an isolated rock formation projecting out of the sand dunes of Siloli at a place known as Árbol de Piedra. It is about 18 km (11 mi) north of Laguna Colorada. It is known as the “Stone Tree” as it is in the shape of a stunted tree, which is formed as a thin rock due to strong wind action.

The climate in winter (May to August) is dry, generally with no rain during the summer (December to April). The average temperature is 3 °C (37 °F). The lowest temperatures are recorded during the months of May, June and July.

== Mountains ==
The park contains the following mountains:

- Sairecabur – 5,971 m, border with Chile
- Putana – 5,890 m
- Licancabur – 5,920 m, border with Chile
- Quetena – 5,730 m
- Piedras Grandes – 5,710 m
- Chijlla – 5,709 m
- Callejón Chico – 5,708 m
- Aguas Calientes – 5,684 m
- Wilama – 5,678 m, border with Argentina
- Bravo – 5,656 m
- Sanabria – 5,654 m
- Loromayu – 5,641 m
- Silata Chahuna – 5640 m
- Juriques – 5,704 m, border with Chile
- Poderosa – 5,614 m
- Quebrada Honda – 5,593 m
- Guayaques – 5,598 m
- Cahuna – 5,583 m
- Waylla Yarita – 5,578 m
- Amarillo – 5,560 m
- Tres Cumbres – 5,509 m
- Pabellón – 5,498 m
- Aguita Brava – 5,485 m
- Baratera – 5,484 m
- Bajo – 5,468 m, border with Argentina
- Puripica Chico – 5,464 m
- Suri Phuyu – 5,458 m
- Panizo – 5,456 m
- Tinte – 5,384 m, border with Argentina
- Brajma – 5,356 m
- Guacha – 5,340 m
- Viscachillos – 5,301 m
- Lagunitas – 5,287 m
- Michina – 5,537 m
- Colorado – 5,264 m
- Sandoncito – 5,252 m
- Lagunitas – 5,203 m
- Estrato – 5,193 m
- Letrato – 5,193 m
- Chicalin – 5,123 m
- Cojita – 5,116 m
- Zapaleri – 5,090 m, border with Argentina and Chile
- Nelly – 5,078 m
- Linzor – 5,680 m
- Puntas Negras – 4,963 m
- Totoral – 4,963 m
- Cueva Blanca – 4,957 m
- Chaco Seguro – 4,948 m
- Loromita – 4,846 m
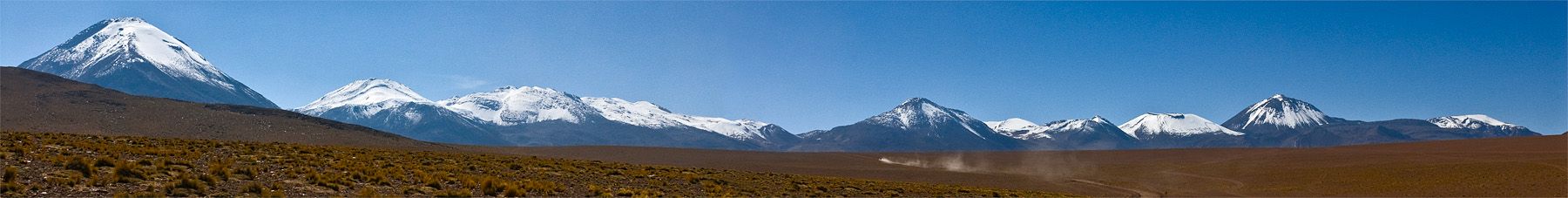
Sairecabur mountain group, Bolivia

== Culture ==
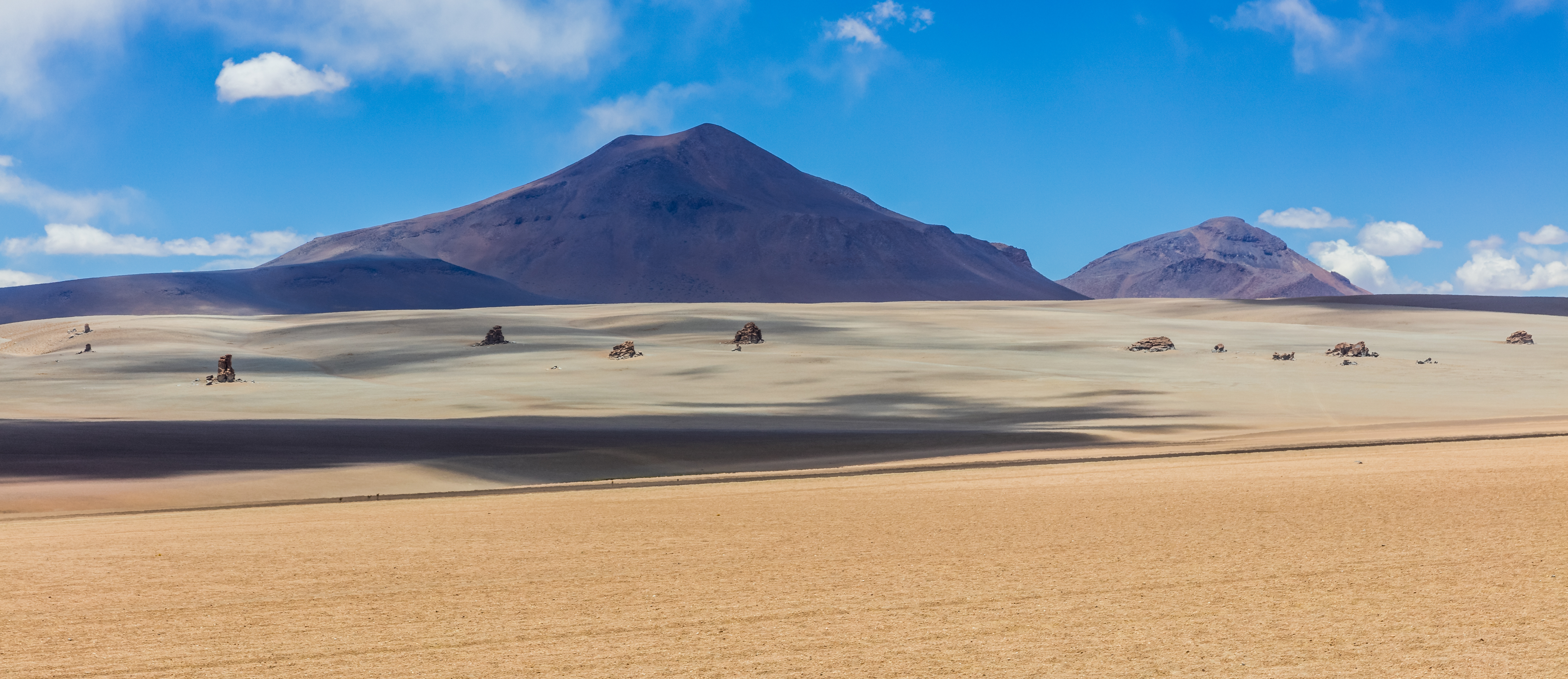
The Salvador Dalí Desert

Quetena Chico, founded in the 1920s, has a population 520, while Quetena Grande, founded shortly thereafter, is the smaller of the two and has a population of 180. Although the inhabitants are of Licanantay descent, their primary language is Spanish. Health care and schooling were unavailable until the 1990s, while electricity and potable water systems were also unavailable at least until 2005. Near Quetena Chico, there are some archaeological remains, jaranas (stone huts), tambos (trail markers), rock paintings, and a ceremonial site lying in a depression between two volcanoes. Atulcha (or Chullpares), is an archeological site with mummies in a cave on Tunupa Volcano.

== Economy ==
The most important income generating activity for the two local communities has been camelid farming,

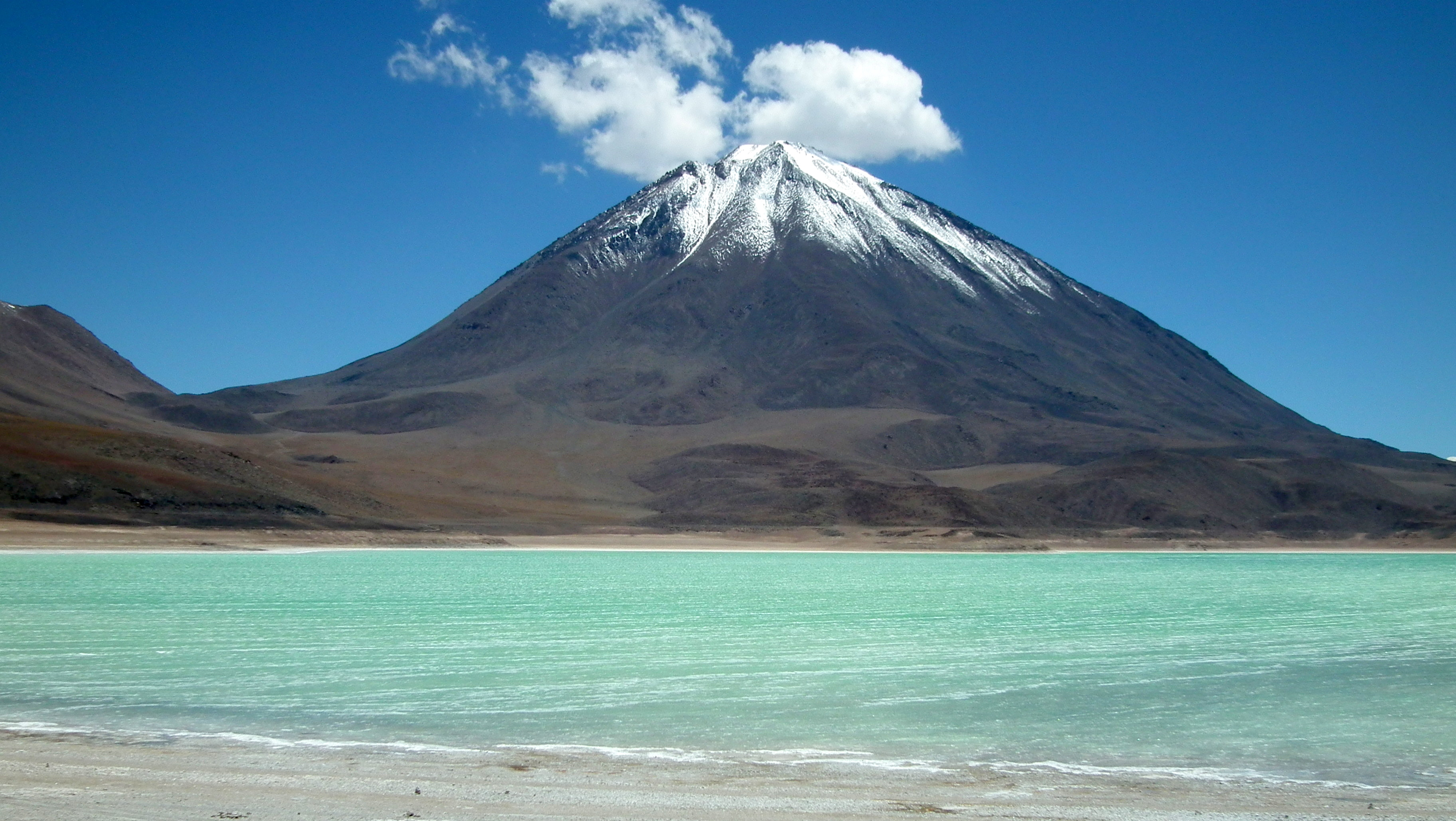
Laguna Verde with the Licancabur volcano in the background

selling llama wool and meat. With the restriction on fox hunting subsequent to the REA, community members' livelihoods have been negatively affected as the fox is the principal predator of llamas. Before establishment of the REA, flamingo egg sales provided monetary income to locals. The park visitor centre is located in Quetena Chico and tourism is growing steadily as, in 2007 there were over 67,000 visitors, six times the number reported in 1997. In addition to working in the tourist trade, locals pan for gold in the Río Quetena.

Mining is a major industry in and around the reserve, rich in natural resources of veins of lead, zinc and silver. As a result, 61 mining concessions are located in the park. Also extracted are its nonmetallic mineral resources like sulfur and ulexite the evaporating mineral. Ulexite is converted to boric acid and is exported to the United States, Europe, Asia and Australia.

== Flora ==
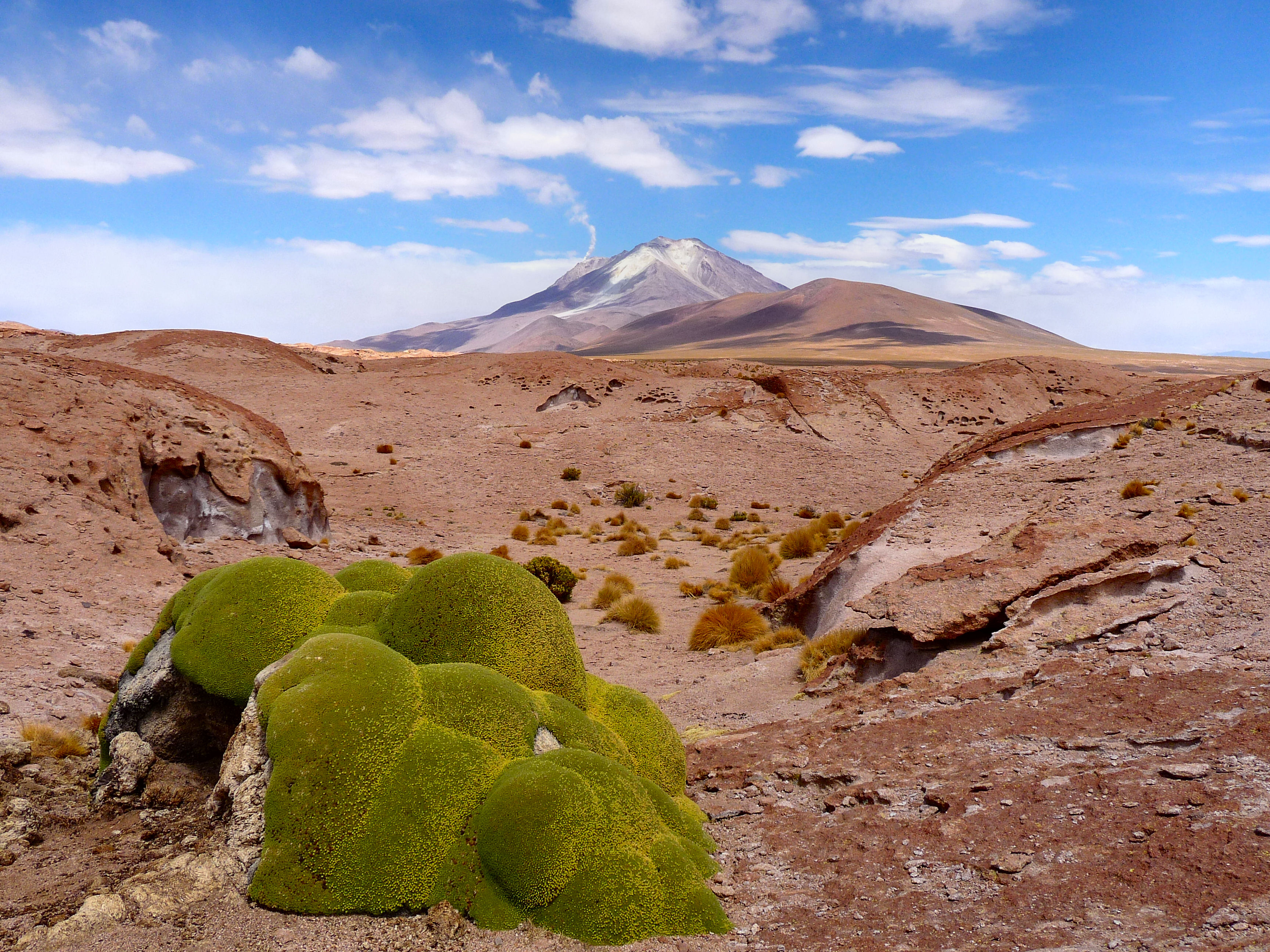
Yareta (Azorella compacta), which may live up to 3,000 years, can be used as firewood fuel when it dries.

The reserve in the Andean has vegetation consisting of tropical alpine herbs with dwarf shrubs of the forests of Polylepis. Plant and tree species are reportedly about 190 species, in the harsh terrain, which have emerged given the conditions of salinity, lack of fresh water, low temperatures, and scarcity of nutrients. Flora restricted to this and other ecoregions include the genera Barneoudia, Hexaptera, Nototriche, Pycnophyllum and Werneria. The vegetation is characterized by the strong presence of pasture grass (straw) such as Peruvian feather grass (Stipa ichu) in some plains and hillsides. The important plant species on which people are dependent for fuel wood in the area is yareta, which grows in the forest of the reserve at 1–3 mm (0.039–0.118 in) per year amidst rocky terrain. This hardwood tree, which looks like a foamy bubble bath but is as hard as stone, grows slowly, attaining a height of about 5 ft (1.5 m) in height with girth of 10 ft (3.0 m) and can be as old as 3000 years. In places with higher humidity, Tola or Thola (Parastrephia lepidophylla), Quinoa and Kenua bush tree are found. The villagers use vegetation as fuel for heating and cooking.

== Fauna ==
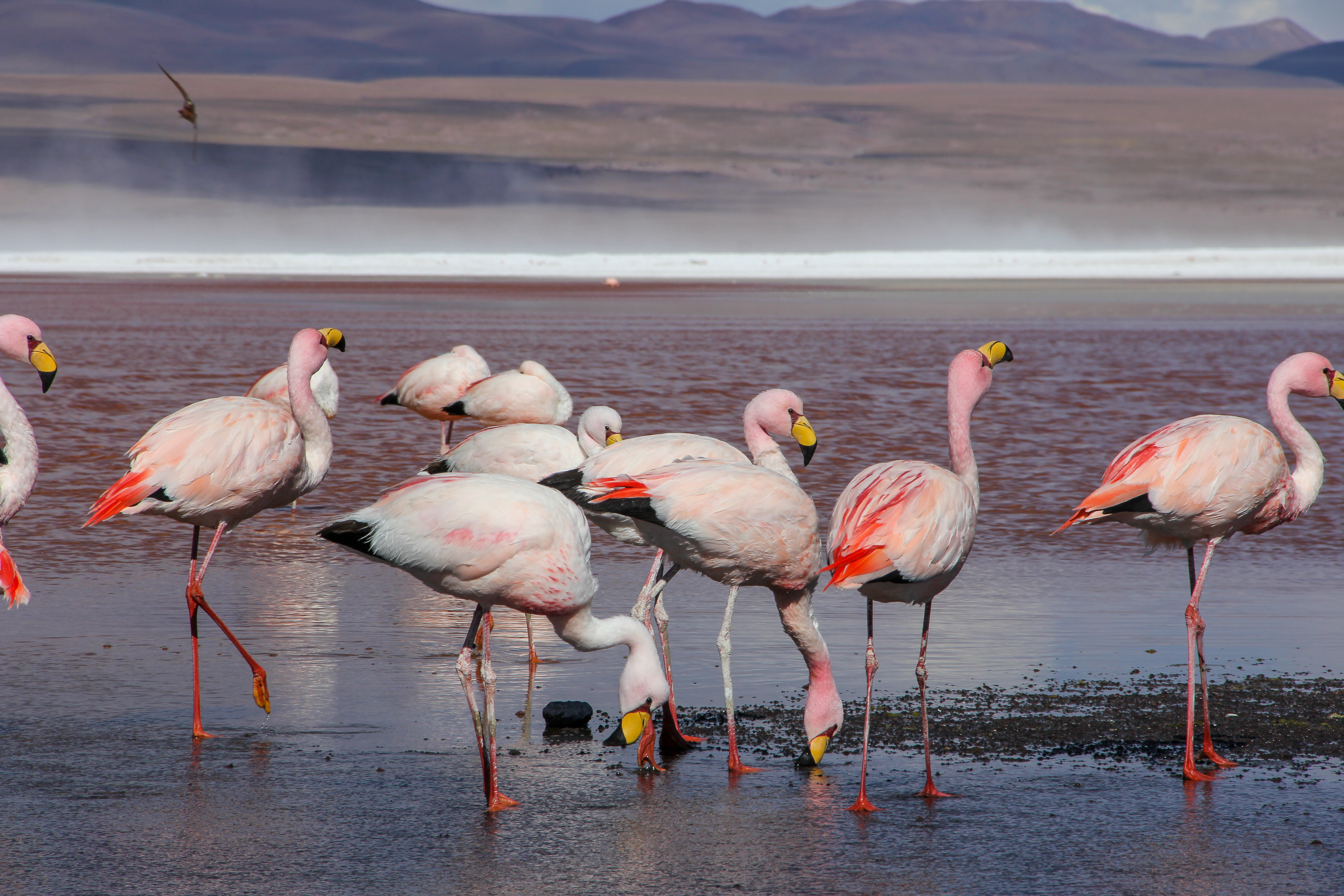
James's flamingos at Laguna Colorada

The reserve is habitat for ten reptile species (including two lizards of the genus Liolaemus), amphibians and fish. Other domesticated animals that are raised in 500 villages inhabited by Quetena Grande and Quetena Chico communities are the llamas and alpacas; however, grazing by these animals on the native grasses and plants in the reserve has a detrimental effect on the conservation of the park.

The fauna is characterized by the presence of species that have adapted to extreme living conditions in the region, some of them endangered. The reserve is home to 80 species of birds. Out of six flamingo species in the world, three species, namely the Chilean, Andean and James flamingos are found in very large numbers in the freshwater lakes and saltwater lagoons of the reserve; of the Phoenicopterus chilensis, Phoenicoparrus andinus and Phoenicoparrus jamesi flamingos in the reserve, their population recorded in 1994 as 26,600. In addition, the reserve is also the habitat for 80 more species of birds, which include the falcons, ducks, lesser rhea (Pterocnemia pennata), puna tinamou (Tinamotis pentlandii) and Andean goose (Chloephaga melanoptera). Endemic birds found in this ecoregion also include the endangered Ash-breasted tit-tyrant (Anairetes alpinus); the critically threatened royal cinclodes (Cinclodes aricomae), the vulnerable Berlepsch's canastero (Asthenes berlepschi); and species of least concern the line-fronted canastero (Asthenes urubambensis), scribble-tailed canastero (Asthenes maculicauda), short-tailed finch (Idiopsar bracyurus), and gray-bellied flower-piercer (Diglosa carbonaria).

Mammals reported in the protected reserve are 23 species, which include pumas, Andean foxes (Pseudalopex culpaeus) and vizcacha (rabbit -like), and also Endangered species of vicuñas (Vicugna vicugna), suri, Andean condor, keñua, puma (Felis concolor), andean cat (Felis jacobita), and quirquincho (Chaetophractus nationi).

== Threats ==
The region of Polylepis forests as a whole has been subject to heavy degradation. The overuse of Polylepis tarapacana, and Azorella compacta has brought the reserve under severe stress. It is due to overgrazing by domesticated animals, use of forest trees for fuel, burning, clearance for cultivation and due to dumping of tailings or mining wastes. Tourism is also perceived as a threat to the park environment and the tourism industry has reported a visitation of a large number of people annually to the reserve; the security forces engaged for protecting the park is inadequate to meet this challenge. Human disturbance, soil erosion, wastes in lakes and lagoons, and fecal coliform runoff from waste are also identified reasons affecting the conservation of flamingos.

== Conservation ==
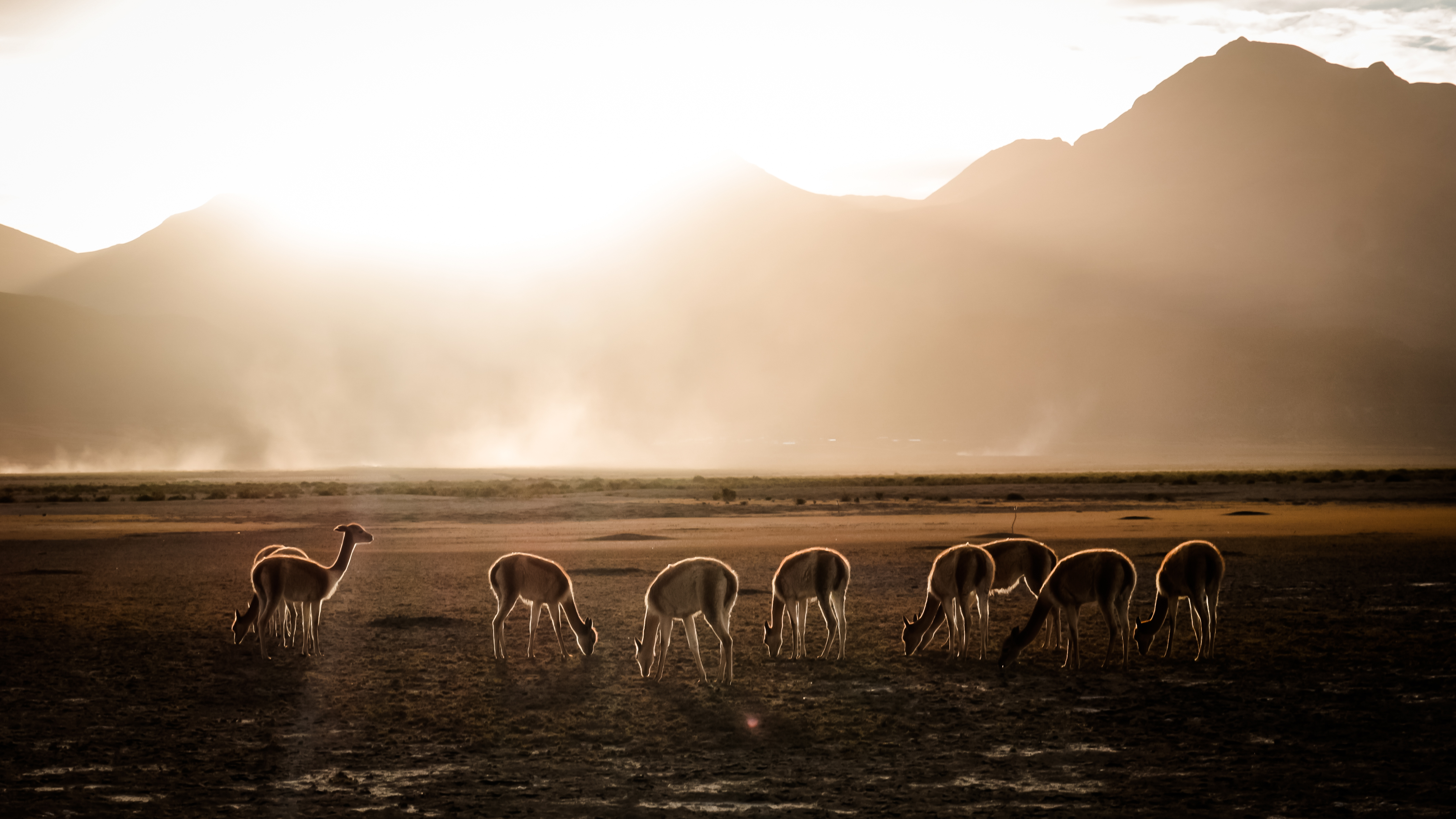
Vicunas (Lama vicugna) grazing in the reserve

The Conservancy and the Bolivian National Protected Areas Service (SERNAP) has the onus for operating and maintaining the reserve with its trained 14 park guards who are provided with patrol vehicles and two-way radios. However, keeping in view the growing influx of tourists to the park and other threats from other sources as reported, SERNAP has prepared a Master Plan for park management plan subsuming ecotourism as an essential component to generate financial resources. According to Andy Drumm, director of the Ecotourism Program, entrance fees at the reserve amounted to about $200,000 in 2006. This necessitated a scientific study on the carrying capacity of the reserve due to large influx of tourists. However, SERNAP is associating the TROPICO (created in 1986 as a non-governmental, non-profit organization for biodiversity conservation in Bolivia.) as its conservancy partner to introduce and enforce environmental regulations in the reserve.

Parks in Peril (PiP), a program of intervention, a collaboration between "the U.S. Agency for International Development (USAID), and the Nature Conservancy to Preserve our Natural Heritage" provided funding for conservations works of the reserve, which is one of the most economically backward areas. This funding, provided between 1999 and 2002, enabled PiP to work in association with the SERNAP and the Nature Conservancy, and TROPICO providing the supervisory services, to evolve a self-sustaining strategy of utilizing park entrance fee for conservation related aspects. This experience gained from this pilot model for ecotourism is now replicated in other parks in Bolivia. Other strategies adopted for conservation of the reserve were: Restricting visitor access to some of the reserve's vulnerable resources; providing natural gas and solar energy as cooking fuel replacing wood cutting from the reserve; agricultural extension services to educate farmers on better methods of farming; improvement of infrastructure in the reserve including staffing for patrolling and security; and collection of scientific data.

== See also ==
- Salvador Dalí Desert
- Sol de Mañana
- Laguna Blanca
- Salar de Chalviri
- Portezuelo del Cajón
