= Laguna Colorada =

Shallow salt lake in the southwest of the altiplano of Bolivia

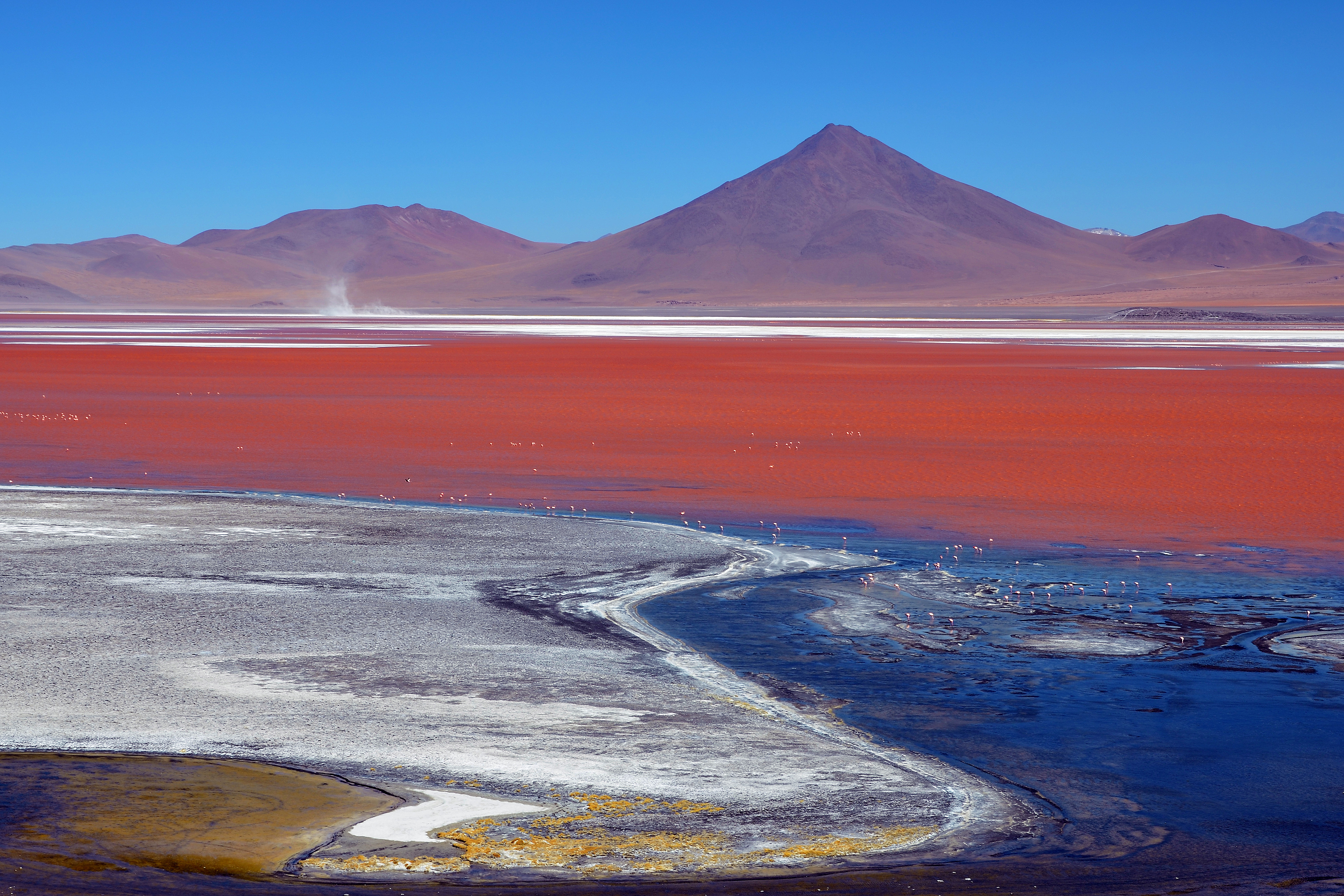
- View of Laguna Colorada in 2014

- Location within Bolivia Location within South America
- Interactive map of Laguna Colorada
- Location: Potosí, Bolivia
- Coordinates: 22°11′55″S 67°46′52″W
- Type: salt lake
- Primary inflows: Rio Sulor
- Basin countries: Bolivia
- Max. length: 10.7 km (6.6 mi)
- Max. width: 9.6 km (6.0 mi)
- Surface area: 60 km^{2} (23 sq mi)
- Average depth: 0.35 m (1 ft 2 in)
- Max. depth: 1.5 m (4 ft 11 in)
- Shore length^{1}: 35 km (22 mi)
- Surface elevation: 4,278 m (14,035 ft)
- Islands: numerous, sometimes huge borax deposit islands

Ramsar Wetland
- Official name: Los Lípez
- Designated: 27 June 1990
- Reference no.: 489
- ^{1} Shore length is not a well-defined measure.

Laguna Colorada, (translated to Red Lagoon), is a shallow, hypersaline lake in the remote southwestern region of the Altiplano, within the Eduardo Avaroa Andean Fauna National Reserve in Bolivia and located at an elevation of approximately 4,278 metres (14,000 ft) above sea level. In 1990, the lake was designated as a wetland of international importance under the Ramsar Convention.

The Laguna Colorada is characterized by its vivid crimson coloration caused by a combination of red sediments and the proliferation of pigmented algae adapted to saline environments, mainly the Dunaliella salina species. The intensity of its coloration, ranging from soft pink tones to deep red, varies depending on the accumulation of algae, sunlight and temperature conditions. Across its surface, the Laguna Colorada contrasts with white islands formed by borax deposits.

Ecologically, the lagoon is a crucial habitat and a primary breeding ground for the several species of flamingos, including the Andean, Chilean and James's flamingos. The abundance of plankton within the lake provides a primary food source for these species, contributing to their distinctive pink plumage. The arid ecosystem surrounding the Laguna Colorada sustains other fauna adapted to high-altitude environments such as the Andean mountain cat, the Andean fox, vicuñas and domesticated llamas.

== Water composition ==
The chemical composition of water entering the Laguna Colorada via its main tributary, the Sulor River, varies broadly depending on climatic conditions and the presence of microorganisms. The lagoon's water is rich in salts, particularly sodium chloride, exhibiting high conductivity and maintaining a pH range of 5.3 to 9.0. It contains high levels of borates, sulfates and diatomite.

The distinctive coloration of its red water is primarily caused by a combination of these sediments and the proliferation of pigmented algae adapted to saline environments, mainly the Dunaliella salina species. The lagoon also contains islands formed by the accumulation of borax, whose white color contrasts with the reddish color of its waters.

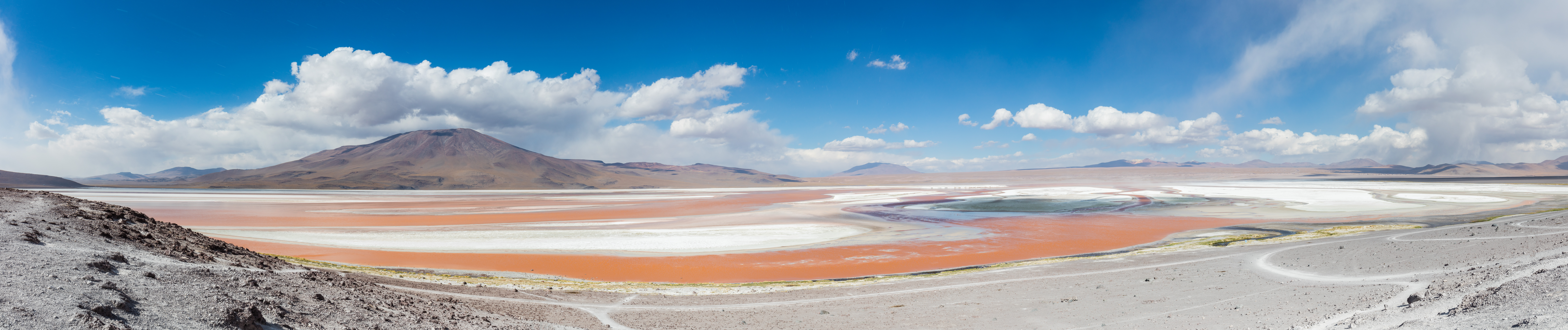
Wide view of Laguna Colorada, showing the lake's red waters and islands made of borax.

== Geography ==
Laguna Colorada is part of the Los Lípez (formerly Laguna Colorada) Ramsar wetland. It was listed as a "Ramsar Wetland of International Importance" in 1990. On, July 13, 2009, the site was expanded from 513.18 to 14,277.17 km^{2} (5,512.45 mi^{2}) to include the surrounding high Andean endorheic, hypersaline and brackish lakes and associated wetlands (known as bofedales).

== Fauna ==
James's flamingos abound in the area. It is also possible to find Andean and Chilean flamingos, but in lesser quantities.

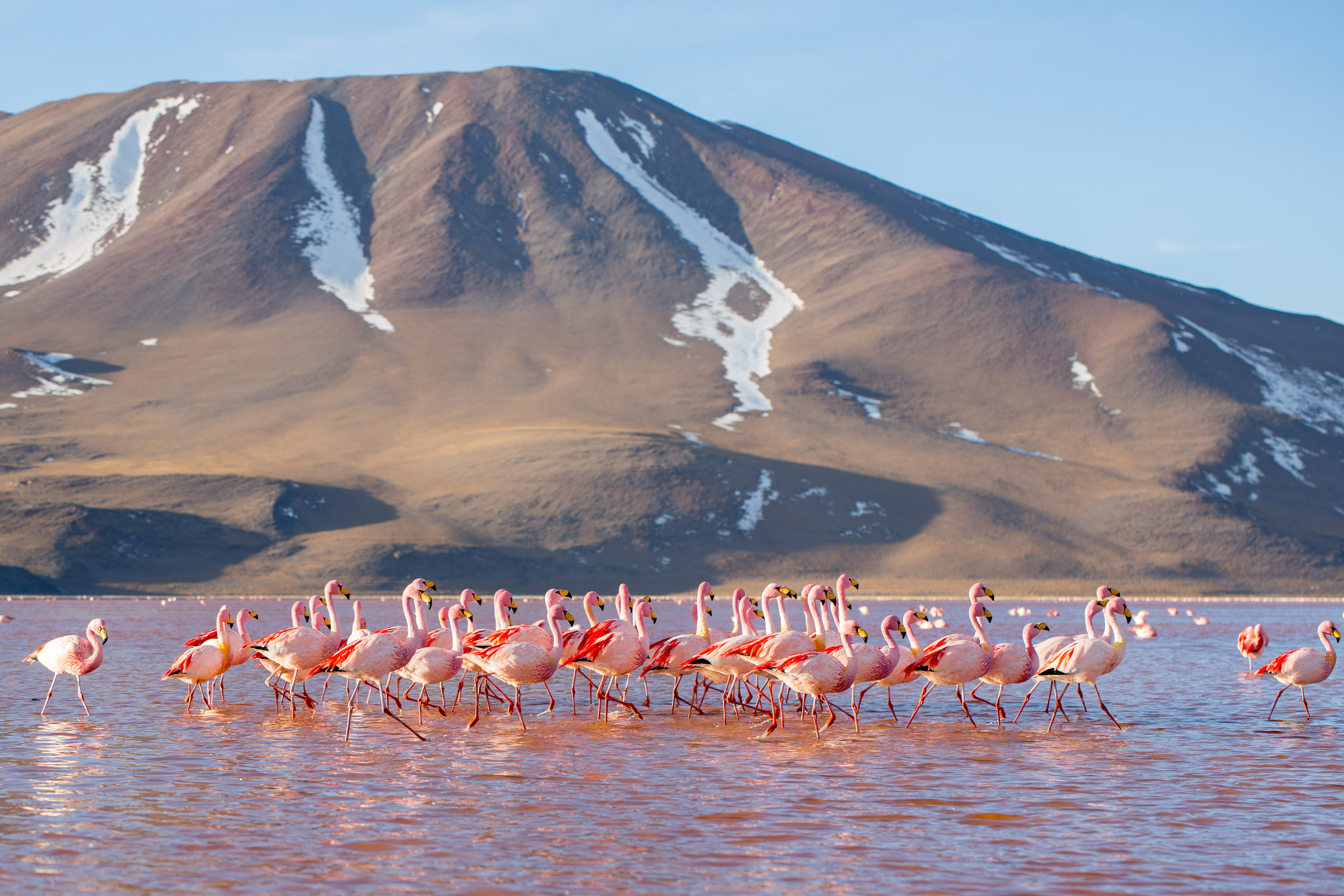
A group of flamingoes in Laguna Colorada

== See also ==
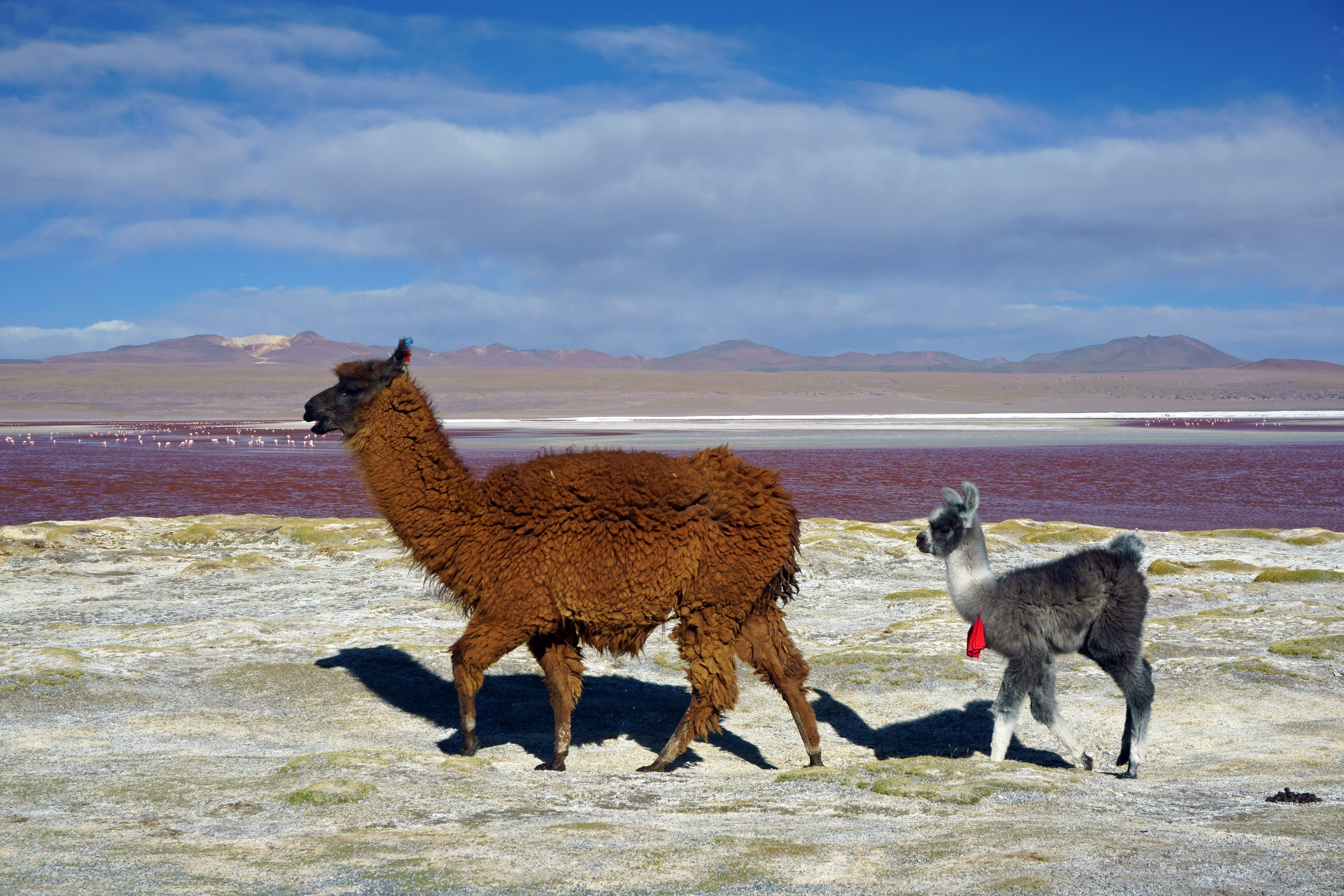
Llama dam and her cria at Laguna Colorada.

- Laguna Verde, a nearby salt lake notable for its green coloration
- Laguna Blanca, a nearby salt lake notable for its white coloration
- Mount Nelly
