= Potosí Department =

Department of Bolivia

Potosí Departamento de Potosí (Spanish) P'utuqsi Suyu (Quechua)
- Department
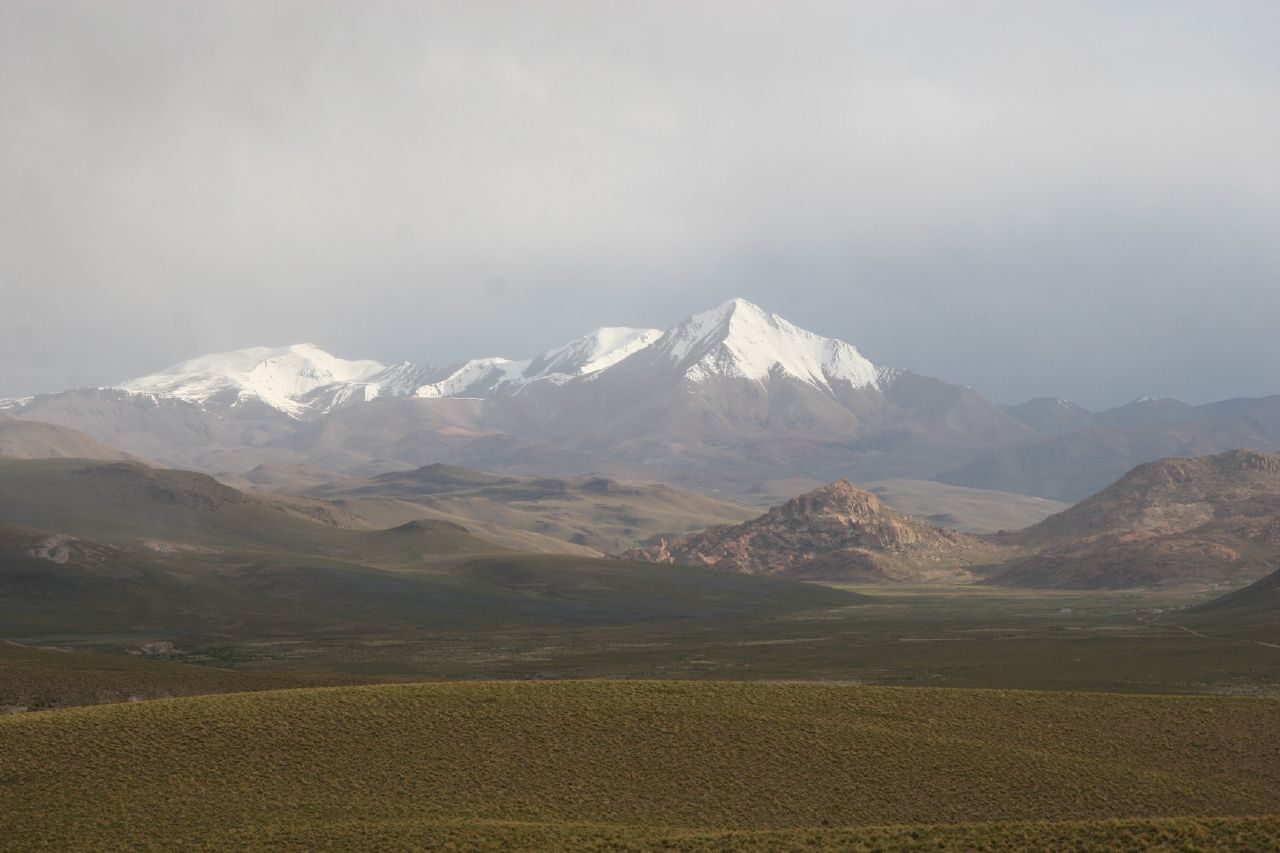
- Cerro Lipez, a stratovolcano

- Flag Coat of arms

- Location within Bolivia
- Coordinates: 20°40′0″S 66°40′0″W
- Country: Bolivia
- Capital: Potosí

Government
  - Body: Departmental Legislative Assembly of Potosí
  - Governor: Jhonny Mamani (detained); Marco Gutiérrez (acting) (MAS-IPSP)

Area
  - Total: 118,218 km^{2} (45,644 sq mi)

Population (2024 census)
  - Total: 856,419
  - Density: 7.24440/km^{2} (18.7629/sq mi)
- Time zone: UTC-4 (BOT)
- HDI (2019): 0.631 medium · 9th of 9
- GDP (2023): in constant values of 2015
- Total: US$1.8 billion Int$4.2 billion (PPP)
- Per capita: US$ 1,900; Int$4,400 (PPP)

Potosí (Spanish pronunciation: [potoˈsi]; Quechua: P'utuqsi; Aymara: Putusi) is a department in southwestern Bolivia. Its area is 118,218 km^{2} (45,644 sq mi) and its population is 856,419 (2024 census). The capital is the city of Potosí. It is a mostly barren, mountainous region with one large plateau to the west, where the largest salt flat in the world, Salar de Uyuni, is located.

Cerro Potosí was the richest province in the Spanish Empire, providing a great percentage of the silver that was shipped to Europe.

Potosi is also the location of the San Cristóbal silver, zinc and lead mines, developed by the US company Apex Silver Mines Limited of Colorado and sold in November 2008 to the Japanese Sumitomo Corporation.

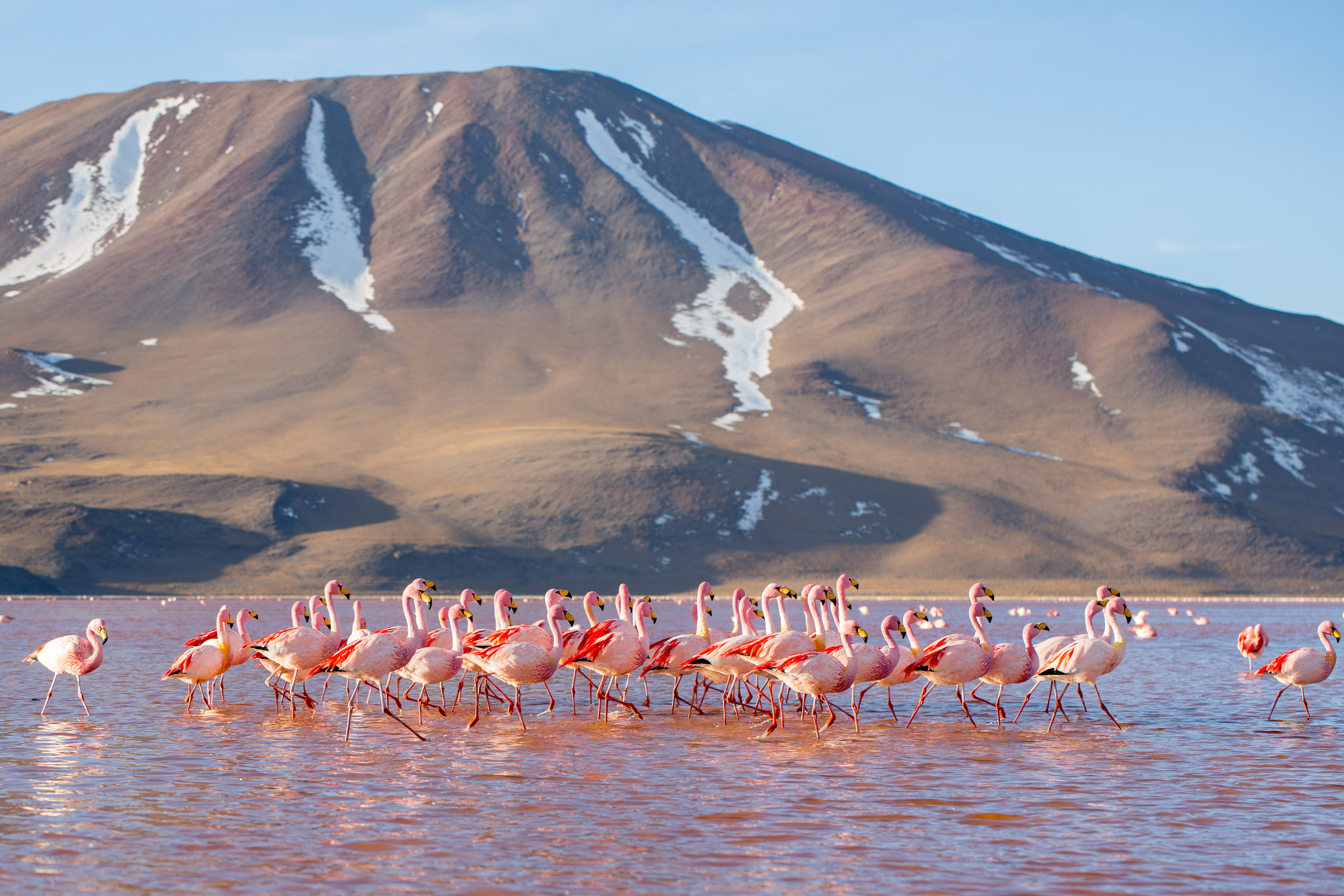
Laguna Colorada with flamingos in the Eduardo Avaroa Andean Fauna National Reserve.

== History ==
In March 2023, social organisations in four regions of Potosí, with the support of regional MAS-IPSP lawmakers, called for a strike spanning over 72 hours, to force the government to raise infrastructure investments in the department and to receive an increased amount of the profits generated through lithium mining in the region. Shortly after the strike an agreement with the central government was reached, stipulating the construction of motorways and a cement plant and further discussions about mining conditions.

== Government ==
=== Executive offices ===
The chief executive office of Bolivia departments (since May 2010) is the governor; until then, the office was called the prefect, and until 2006 the prefect was appointed by the President of Bolivia. The current governor, Jhonny Mamani of the Movement for Socialism – Political Instrument for the Sovereignty of the Peoples was elected on 7 March 2021.

Took office	Office expired	Prefect/Governor	Party	Notes
23 Jan 2006	30 May 2010	Mario Virreira Iporre	MAS-IPSP	First elected prefect. Elected in Bolivian general election, December 2005
30 May 2010	31 May 2015	Félix Gonzáles	MAS-IPSP	Elected in regional election on 4 April 2010 with 63.1% of the vote; first governor.
31 May 2015	15 Nov 2019	Juan Carlos Cejas	MAS-IPSP	Elected in regional election on 29 March 2015.
15 Nov 2019	3 May 2021	Omar Veliz Ramos	MAS-IPSP	
3 May 2021		Jhonny Mamani	MAS-IPSP	Elected in regional election on 7 March 2021.

=== Legislative Assembly ===
Under the 2009 Constitution, each Bolivian department has an elected Departmental Legislative Assembly. The first elections were held 4 April 2010.

The current executive committee consists of Jacinto Sunagua Dorado as president, Raimunda Cordero Caba as vice-president and Alberto Quispe Mamani as secretary and Blanca Celia Burgos Quispe and Leon Jancko Condori as first and second committee member, respectively.

== Demographics ==
Historical population
Year	Pop.	±% p.a.
1976	657,743	—
1992	645,889	−0.11%
2001	709,013	+1.04%
2012	828,093	+1.42%
2024	856,419	+0.28%
Source: Citypopulation

== Provinces of Potosi Department ==
The department is divided into 16 provinces which are further subdivided into 40 municipalities (municipios) and 219 cantons (cantones).

Province	Capital	Area km^{2}	Population (2012 census)	Map Number
Alonso de Ibáñez	Sacaca	2.170	29.821	1
Antonio Quijarro	Uyuni	14,890	54,947	12
Bernardino Bilbao	Arampampa	640	10,224	2
Charcas	San Pedro de Buena Vista	2,964	41,214	3
Chayanta	Colquechaca	7,026	97,251	5
Cornelio Saavedra	Betanzos	2,375	55,100	7
Daniel Campos	Llica	12,106	5,850	13
Enrique Baldivieso	San Agustín	2,254	1,684	15
José María Linares	Puna	5,136	49,619	8
Modesto Omiste	Villazón	2,260	44,645	11
Nor Chichas	Cotagaita	8,979	42,248	9
Nor Lípez	Colcha K	20,892	14,057	14
Rafael Bustillo	Uncía	2,235	86,947	4
Sud Chichas	Tupiza	8,516	55,879	10
Sud Lípez	San Pablo de Lípez	22,355	6,835	16
Tomás Frías	Potosí	3,420	229,047	6

== Economy ==
=== Mining ===
- Salar de Uyuni mine (Lithium)
- San Vicente mine (Silver)

== Languages ==
The main languages spoken in the department are Quechua, Spanish and Aymara. The following table shows the number of speakers of recognized languages in Potosí and in all of Bolivia.

Language	Department	Bolivia
Quechua	514,421	2,281,198
Aymara	57,738	1,525,321
Guaraní	374	62,575
Other native	356	49,432
Spanish	438,204	6,821,626
Foreign	3,771	250,754
Only native	226,967	960,491
Native and Spanish	301,280	2,739,407
Spanish and foreign	136,980	4,115,751

== Places of interest ==
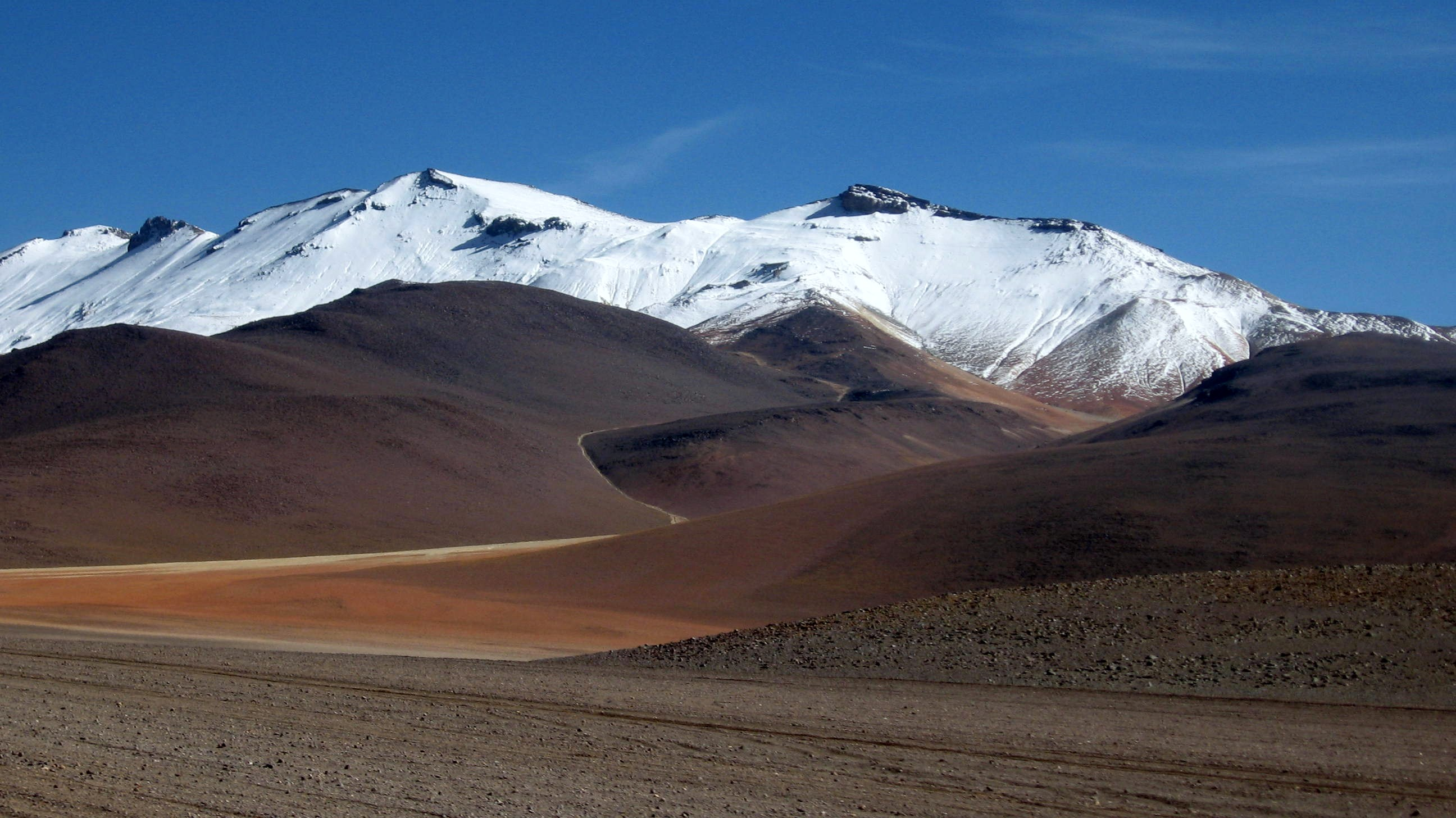
The Andes mountain range in Potosí

- Eduardo Avaroa Andean Fauna National Reserve
- Torotoro National Park
- Laguna Colorada
- Laguna Verde
- Laguna Blanca
- Salar de Uyuni
- Potosí
- Uyuni

== Notable people ==
- Juana Azurduy de Padilla, guerrilla military leader.
- Manuel Ascencio Padilla, namesake of the town of Padilla, Bolivia.
- Modesto Omiste Tinajeros, writer, politician, and namesake of the province Modesto Omiste.

== See also ==
- Oruro–Potosí boundary conflicts
- Provinces of Bolivia
