= List of lakes in Bolivia =

The geography and climate of Bolivia has led to the formation a wide variety of lakes, from salt saturated lakes in the Altiplano to oxbow lakes in the eastern lowlands. Many of Bolivias lakes are formed only seasonally during the austral summer and remains for the rest of the year as salt flats in the altiplano or swamps in the eastern lowlands.

== Lakes in the Altiplano basin ==
All major lakes in the Altiplano belong to the same endorheic basin that when supplied with enough water ends at Salar de Uyuni. Many of the lakes in the altiplano show large fluctuations in area like Poopó Lake that has dried up several times through history. The salt flats of Coipasa and Uyuni have only very small surfaces where water can be observed through all year but are covered each year in summer by up to one meter of water.

Lakes with an area of more than 100 km^{2} in the Altiplano
| Name | Area (km^{2}) | Surface elevation | Max depth | Salinity |
|---|---|---|---|---|
| Titicaca | 3,790 (Note: 3790 km^{2} of the Titicaca lake's total 8.562 km^{2} are inside Bolivian borders) | 3,810 m.a.s.l. | 281 m | Brackish |
| Poopó Lake | 1,000 | 3,686 m.a.s.l. | | Brackish |
| Salar de Coipasa | 2,218 | 3,657 m.a.s.l. | - | Saturated in salt |
| Salar de Uyuni | 10,582 | 3,663 m.a.s.l. | - | Saturated in salt |
| Uru Uru | 214 | 3,686 m.a.s.l. | 1.5 m | Brackish to salt |

== Lakes in the lowlands ==
Lakes in the lowlands with an area of more than 100 km^{2}
| Name | Area | Surface elevation | Max depth | Salinity |
|---|---|---|---|---|
| Huaytunas | 329.5 km^{2} | 146 m.a.s.l. | - | Fresh |
| Rogaguado | 315 km^{2} | 143 m.a.s.l. | - | Fresh |
| Rogagua | 155.6 km^{2} | 164 m.a.s.l. | - | Fresh |
| Guachuna | 102.8 km^{2} | 150 m.a.s.l. | - | Fresh |
| El Océano | 100 km^{2} | - | - | Fresh |

== Lakes by department ==
| Name | Elevation | Area | Department |
|---|---|---|---|
| Achiri Lake | 3,876 m (12,717 ft) | 2.8 km^{2} (1.1 mi^{2}) | La Paz |
| Alalay Lake | 3,686 m (12,093 ft) | 2.4 km^{2} (0.93 mi^{2}) | Cochabamba |
| Allqa Quta | 4,537 m (14,885 ft) | | La Paz |
| Aquiles Lake | 224 m (735 ft) | 19 km^{2} (7.3 mi^{2}) | Beni |
| Araré Lake | 160 m (520 ft) | 68 km^{2} (26 mi^{2}) | Beni |
| Aricare Lake | 180 m (590 ft) | 10.33 km^{2} (3.99 mi^{2}) | Beni |
| Awallamaya Lake | 3,825 m (12,549 ft) | 96 km^{2} (37 mi^{2}) | La Paz |
| Bahia Toco Largo Lake | 165 m (541 ft) | 6.5 km^{2} (2.5 mi^{2}) | Santa Cruz |
| Bellavista Lake | 200 m (660 ft) | 24.8 km^{2} (9.6 mi^{2}) | Santa Cruz |
| Bolivia Lake | 166 m (545 ft) | 11 km^{2} (4.2 mi^{2}) | Beni |
| Bravo Lake | 167 m (548 ft) | 25.7 km^{2} (9.9 mi^{2}) | Beni |
| Buenos Aires Lake (Bolivia) | 206 m (676 ft) | 7.6 km^{2} (2.9 mi^{2}) | Beni |
| Cáceres Lake | 150 m (490 ft) | 26.5 to 200 km^{2} (10.2 to 77.2 mi^{2}) | Santa Cruz |
| Cacha Lake | 4,670 m (15,320 ft) | 0.72 km^{2} (0.28 mi^{2}) | La Paz |
| Cachimbo Lake | 196 m (643 ft) | 26.56 km^{2} (10.25 mi^{2}) | Beni |
| Carreras Lake | 135 m (443 ft) | 13 km^{2} (5.0 mi^{2}) | Beni |
| Ch'alla Quta | ≈ 4,700 m (15,400 ft) | | La Paz |
| Chaplín Lake | 190 m (620 ft) | 13 km^{2} (5.0 mi^{2}) | Santa Cruz |
| Chilata Lake | 5,030 m (16,500 ft) | 0.05 km^{2} (0.019 mi^{2}) | La Paz |
| Chillwa Quta | ≈ 4,300 m (14,100 ft) | | La Paz |
| Ch'iyar Quta (La Paz) | 4,700 m (15,400 ft) | | La Paz |
| Ch'uxña Quta (Charasani) | 4,454 m (14,613 ft) | | La Paz |
| Ch'uxña Quta (Curva) | 5,543 m (18,186 ft) | | La Paz |
| Ch'uxña Quta (Murillo) | 4,960 m (16,270 ft) | | La Paz |
| Coipasa Lake | 3,657 m (11,998 ft) | 806 km^{2} (311 mi^{2}) | Oruro |
| Cololo Lake | 4,538 m (14,888 ft) | 5.2 km^{2} (2.0 mi^{2}) | La Paz |
| Colorado Lake | 4,278 m (14,035 ft) | 15.93 km^{2} (6.15 mi^{2}) | Beni |
| Concepción Lake | 248 m (814 ft) | 158 km^{2} (61 mi^{2}) | Santa Cruz |
| Consuelo Lake | | 2.6 km^{2} (1.0 mi^{2}) | Santa Cruz |
| Corani Lake | | 18 km^{2} (6.9 mi^{2}) | Cochabamba |
| Coranto Lake | 4,382 m (14,377 ft) | 7.6 km^{2} (2.9 mi^{2}) | Potosí |
| Coruto Lake | 4,505 m (14,780 ft) | 15.8 km^{2} (6.1 mi^{2}) | Potosí |
| El Encanto Lake | 170 m (560 ft) | 4.5 km^{2} (1.7 mi^{2}) | Beni |
| El Océano Lake | | 100 km^{2} (39 mi^{2}) | Beni |
| El Triunfo Lake | | 19.3 km^{2} (7.5 mi^{2}) | Beni |
| España Lake | | 34 km^{2} (13 mi^{2}) | Santa Cruz |
| Francia Lake | | 5.6 km^{2} (2.2 mi^{2}) | Beni |
| Guachuna Lake | 150 m (490 ft) | 102.8 km^{2} (39.7 mi^{2}) | Beni |
| Guayaques Lake | | 1.43 km^{2} (0.55 mi^{2}) | Potosí |
| Huachi Lake | 173 m (568 ft) | 67 km^{2} (26 mi^{2}) | Beni |
| Huaytunas Lake | 146 m (479 ft) | 329.5 km^{2} (127.2 mi^{2}) | Beni |
| Isirere Lake | 258 m (846 ft) | 19.3 km^{2} (7.5 mi^{2}) | Beni |
| Jach'a Quta (Aroma) | | | La Paz |
| Jach'a Quta (Murillo) | 3,760 m (12,340 ft) | | La Paz |
| Jach'a Quta (Sud Yungas) | | | La Paz |
| Janq'u Qala Lake | 4,489 m (14,728 ft) | | La Paz |
| Janq'u Quta (Batallas) | 4,940 m (16,210 ft) | | La Paz |
| Janq'u Quta (El Alto) | 4,664 m (15,302 ft) | 1.8 km^{2} (0.69 mi^{2}) | La Paz |
| Janq'u Quta (Larecaja) | | | La Paz |
| Jara Lake | 191 m (627 ft) | 16.5 km^{2} (6.4 mi^{2}) | Beni |
| Jayu Quta (Carangas) | | 7.83 km^{2} (3.02 mi^{2}) | Oruro |
| Juri Quta (Batallas) | 4,596 m (15,079 ft) | | La Paz |
| Juri Quta (Pukarani) | 4,932 m (16,181 ft) | | La Paz |
| Kalina Lake | 4,525 m (14,846 ft) | 20.6 km^{2} (8.0 mi^{2}) | Potosí |
| Kara Lake | 4,522 m (14,836 ft) | 13 km^{2} (5.0 mi^{2}) | Potosí |
| K'ayrani Quta | | | La Paz |
| K'iski Quta | | | La Paz |
| La Angostura Lake | 2,700 m (8,900 ft) | 10.5 km^{2} (4.1 mi^{2}) | Cochabamba |
| La Gaiba Lake | 160 m (520 ft) | 98 km^{2} (38 mi^{2}) | Santa Cruz |
| La Laguna Lake | 2,926 m (9,600 ft) | 7.8 km^{2} (3.0 mi^{2}) | Chuquisaca |
| La Porfía Lake | | 58.5 km^{2} (22.6 mi^{2}) | Beni |
| La Sarca Lake | 136 m (446 ft) | 26 km^{2} (10 mi^{2}) | Beni |
| Laguna Azul (Bolivia) | | 6.1 km^{2} (2.4 mi^{2}) | Beni |
| Laguna Capina | | 23.8 km^{2} (9.2 mi^{2}) | Potosí |
| Laguna Celeste | 4,529 m (14,859 ft) | 2.3 km^{2} (0.89 mi^{2}) | Potosí |
| Laguna Glaciar | 5,038 m (16,529 ft) | 0.2 km^{2} (0.077 mi^{2}) | La Paz |
| Laguna Grande (Bolivia) | 3,638 m (11,936 ft) | 6.7 km^{2} (2.6 mi^{2}) | Tarija |
| Laguna Hedionda (Sud Lípez) | 4,532 m (14,869 ft) | 3.2 km^{2} (1.2 mi^{2}) | Potosí |
| Laguna Larga (Bolivia) | 148 m (486 ft) | 100 km^{2} (39 mi^{2}) | Beni |
| Laguna Verde (Beni) | 175 m (574 ft) | 4.53 km^{2} (1.75 mi^{2}) | Beni |
| Laguna Verde (Comarapa) | 2,419 m (7,936 ft) | 0.002 km^{2} (0.00077 mi^{2}) | Santa Cruz |
| Laguna Victoria | 201 m (659 ft) | 25 km^{2} (9.7 mi^{2}) | Beni |
| Laram Quta (El Alto) | 4,556 m (14,948 ft) | | La Paz |
| Laram Quta (Inquisivi) | 4,862 m (15,951 ft) | | La Paz |
| Laram Quta (La Paz) | | | La Paz |
| Laram Quta (Los Andes) | 3,850 m (12,630 ft) | | La Paz |
| Laram Quta (Sud Yungas) | | | La Paz |
| Larati Lake | 3,585 m (11,762 ft) | 1.36 km^{2} (0.53 mi^{2}) | Cochabamba |
| Las Habras Lake | 136 m (446 ft) | 73 km^{2} (28 mi^{2}) | Beni |
| Lawrawani Lake | 4,475 m (14,682 ft) | | La Paz |
| Luru Mayu Lake | 4,666 m (15,308 ft) | 12 km^{2} (4.6 mi^{2}) | Potosí |
| Mancornadas Lake | 163 m (535 ft) | 74.16 km^{2} (28.63 mi^{2}) | Beni |
| Mandioré Lake | 90 m (300 ft) | 152 km^{2} (59 mi^{2}) | Santa Cruz |
| Maracaibo Lake (Bolivia) | 177 m (581 ft) | 15.8 km^{2} (6.1 mi^{2}) | Beni |
| Marfil Lake | 246 m (807 ft) | 97.5 km^{2} (37.6 mi^{2}) | Santa Cruz |
| Matuwal Lake | | 6.83 km^{2} (2.64 mi^{2}) | Beni |
| Mentiroso Lake | 140 m (460 ft) | 6.9 km^{2} (2.7 mi^{2}) | Pando |
| Milluni Lake | 4,565 m (14,977 ft) | 2.37 km^{2} (0.92 mi^{2}) | La Paz |
| Mirim Lake (Bolivia) | | 15.8 km^{2} (6.1 mi^{2}) | Santa Cruz |
| Murillo Lake | 140 m (460 ft) | 7.6 km^{2} (2.9 mi^{2}) | Pando |
| Navidad Lake | 160 m (520 ft) | 22.5 km^{2} (8.7 mi^{2}) | Beni |
| Nuevo Mundo Lake | 180 m (590 ft) | 57.7 km^{2} (22.3 mi^{2}) | Beni |
| Omoro Lake | 193 m (633 ft) | 6 km^{2} (2.3 mi^{2}) | Beni |
| Pajaral Lake | 200 m (660 ft) | 9.3 km^{2} (3.6 mi^{2}) | Beni |
| Parina Quta (Bolivia-Peru) | 4,216 m (13,832 ft) | | La Paz |
| Parina Quta (Oruro) | 3,753 m (12,313 ft) | | Oruro |
| Pastos Grandes Lake | 4,330 m (14,210 ft) | 120 km^{2} (46 mi^{2}) | Potosí |
| Phaq'u Quta | 4,667 m (15,312 ft) | | La Paz |
| Pistola Lake | | 33.52 km^{2} (12.94 mi^{2}) | Santa Cruz |
| Portia Lake | 200 m (660 ft) | 28 km^{2} (11 mi^{2}) | Beni |
| Q'ara Quta (La Paz) | 4,400 m (14,400 ft) | | La Paz |
| Rodeo Lake | 3,485 m (11,434 ft) | 0.2 km^{2} (0.077 mi^{2}) | Cochabamba |
| Rogagua Lake | | 155 km^{2} (60 mi^{2}) | Beni |
| Sajama Lake | | 0.3 km^{2} (0.12 mi^{2}) | Oruro |
| San Antonio Lake (Bolivia) | 205 m (673 ft) | 26 km^{2} (10 mi^{2}) | Beni |
| San Francisco Lake | 138 m (453 ft) | 12.7 km^{2} (4.9 mi^{2}) | Beni |
| San Jorge Lake | 160 m (520 ft) | 68.6 km^{2} (26.5 mi^{2}) | Beni |
| San José Lake | 202 m (663 ft) | 14.7 km^{2} (5.7 mi^{2}) | Beni |
| San Lorenzo Lake | 178 m (584 ft) | 26.2 km^{2} (10.1 mi^{2}) | Beni |
| San Pedro Lake | 207 m (679 ft) | 21.9 km^{2} (8.5 mi^{2}) | Beni |
| San Roque Lake (Bolivia) | 190 m (620 ft) | 4.5 km^{2} (1.7 mi^{2}) | Beni |
| Sirk'i Quta | 4,814 m (15,794 ft) | | La Paz |
| Suárez Lake | | 6 km^{2} (2.3 mi^{2}) | Beni |
| Suches Lake | 4,605 m (15,108 ft) | 14.2 km^{2} (5.5 mi^{2}) | La Paz |
| Sura Quta (Wayna Potosí) | 4,491 m (14,734 ft) | | La Paz |
| Taborga Lake | 200 m (660 ft) | 25.5 km^{2} (9.8 mi^{2}) | Santa Cruz |
| Tacuaral Lake | 170 m (560 ft) | 16.7 km^{2} (6.4 mi^{2}) | Beni |
| T'ala Qucha | | | Potosí |
| Tanguina Lake | 176 m (577 ft) | 14.8 km^{2} (5.7 mi^{2}) | Beni |
| Tapada Lake | 206 m (676 ft) | 19.01 km^{2} (7.34 mi^{2}) | Beni |
| Taypi Chaka Quta | 4,412 m (14,475 ft) | | La Paz |
| Tejas Lake | | 5.41 km^{2} (2.09 mi^{2}) | Santa Cruz |
| Todos Santos Lake | 193 m (633 ft) | 4.12 km^{2} (1.59 mi^{2}) | Beni |
| Tumichuqua Lake | | 3.4 km^{2} (1.3 mi^{2}) | Beni |
| Uberaba Lake | 190 m (620 ft) | 400 km^{2} (150 mi^{2}) | Santa Cruz |
| Urqu Qucha (Bolivia) | | | Potosí |
| Uru Uru Lake | 3,686 m (12,093 ft) | 214 km^{2} (83 mi^{2}) | Oruro |
| Ventarrón Lake | 185 m (607 ft) | 2.5 km^{2} (0.97 mi^{2}) | Pando |
| Volcán Lake | | 0.059 km^{2} (0.023 mi^{2}) | Santa Cruz |
| Wallatani Lake | 4,939 m (16,204 ft) | | La Paz |
| Waña Quta (Cochabamba) | 2,752 m (9,029 ft) | | Cochabamba |
| Waña Quta (La Paz) | 4,761 m (15,620 ft) | | La Paz |
| Warawara Lake (Cochabamba) | 4,105 m (13,468 ft) | | Cochabamba |
| Warawara Lake (Oruro) | | | Oruro |
| Warus Quta (Larecaja) | | | La Paz |
| Warus Quta (Loayza) | | | La Paz |
| Watir Quta | | | La Paz |
| Yusala Lake | 170 m (560 ft) | 13.67 km^{2} (5.28 mi^{2}) | Beni |
| Zapaleri Lake | 4,608 m (15,118 ft) | 2 km^{2} (0.77 mi^{2}) | Potosí |

== Example ==
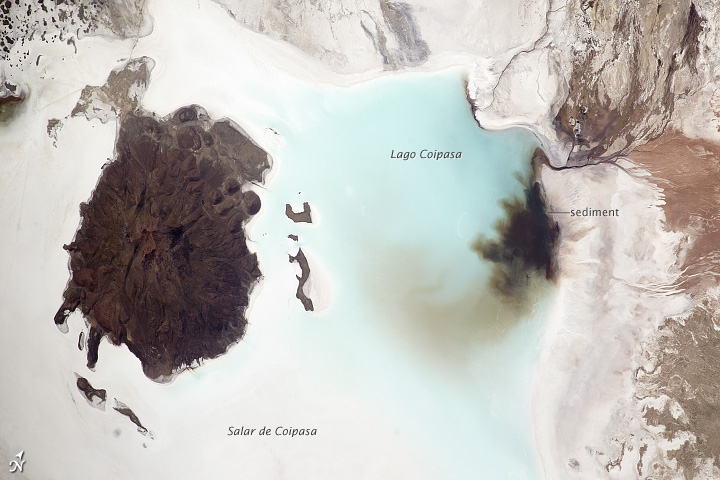
Coipasa Lake

== See also ==
- List of lakes in Beni Department
