= List of international lakes =

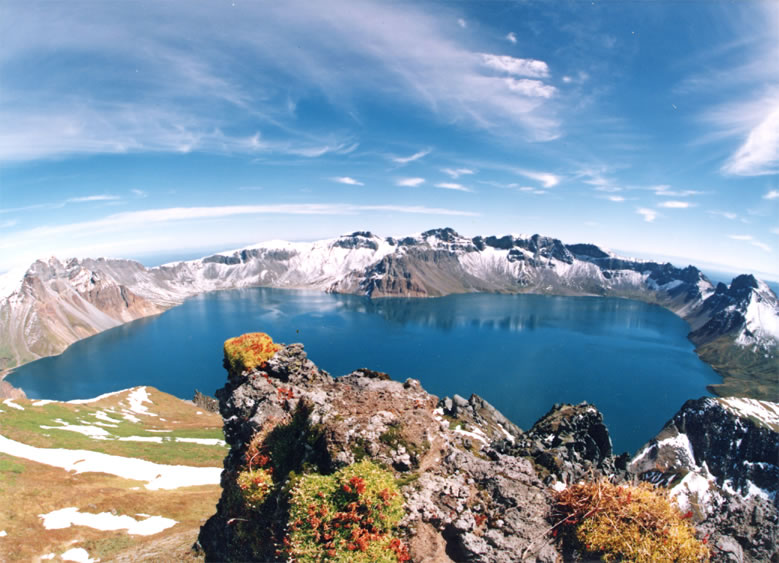
Heaven Lake China North Korea

Lakes with international borders include

== Africa ==
River	Bordering countries
Lake Abbe	Djibouti/Ethiopia
Lake Albert	Democratic Republic of the Congo/Uganda
Lake Chad	Cameroon/Chad/Niger/Nigeria
Lake Chew Bahir	Ethiopia/Kenya
Lake Chiuta	Malawi/Mozambique
Lake Cohoha	Burundi/Rwanda
Lake Edward	Democratic Republic of the Congo/Uganda
Lake Fianga	Cameroon/Chad
Lake Kariba	Zambia/Zimbabwe
Lake Kivu	Democratic Republic of the Congo/Rwanda
Lake Malawi (Lake Nyasa in Tanzania and Lago Niassa in Mozambique)	Malawi/Mozambique/Tanzania
Lake Mweru	Democratic Republic of the Congo/Zambia
Lake Nasser (Arabic: بحيرة ناصر Boħēret Nāṣer; Sudanese: Lake Nubia)	Egypt/Sudan
Lake Rweru	Burundi/Rwanda
Lake Sélingué (artificial lake)	Mali/Guinea
Lake Tanganyika	Tanzania/Democratic Republic of the Congo/Burundi/Zambia
Lake Turkana	Ethiopia/Kenya
Lake Victoria	Kenya/Tanzania/Uganda

== Asia ==
River	Bordering countries
Ayke	Kazakhstan/ Russia
Aral Sea	Kazakhstan/ Uzbekistan
Barun-Torey Lake	Mongolia/ Russia
Botkul	Kazakhstan/ Russia
Buir Lake	China/ Mongolia
Caspian Sea	Azerbaijan/ Iran/ Kazakhstan/ Russia/ Turkmenistan
Dead Sea	Israel/ Jordan
Heaven Lake (Chosŏn'gŭl: 천지, Ch'ŏnji or Cheonji; Chinese: 天池, Tiānchí; Manchu: Tamun omo or Tamun juce)	China/ North Korea
Kartsakhi Lake (Georgian: კარწახის ტბა, karts'akhis tba), or Lake Khozapini (Georgian: ხოზაფინის ტბა, khozap'inis tba; Turkish: Hazapin Gölü), or Lake Aktaş (Turkish: Aktaş Gölü)	Georgia/ Turkey
Lake Khanka (Russian: о́зеро Ха́нка) or Lake Xingkai (simplified Chinese: 兴凯湖; traditional Chinese: 興凱湖; pinyin: Xīngkǎi Hú)	China/ Russia
Pangong Tso or Pangong Lake (Tibetan: སྤང་གོང་མཚོ, Wylie: spang gong mtsho; Hindi: पांगोंग त्सो; Chinese: 班公错; pinyin: Bāngōng Cuò)	China/ India
Sabkhat Matti (dry)	United Arab Emirates/ Saudi Arabia
Sarygamysh Lake	Uzbekistan/ Turkmenistan
Supung Lake (artificial)	China/ North Korea
Tore-Khol Lake	Mongolia/ Russia
Uvs Lake	Mongolia/ Russia
Zorkul	Afghanistan/ Tajikistan

== Europe ==
River	Bordering country
Båvrojávrre	Norway/ Sweden
Bilećko Lake	Bosnia and Herzegovina/ Montenegro
Lac des Brenets (Swiss name) or Lac de Chaillexon (French name)	Switzerland/ France
Lake Constance	Switzerland/ Germany/ Austria
Cuciurgan Reservoir (artificial lake)	Moldova/ Ukraine
Doiran Lake or Doiran Lake (Macedonian: Дојранско Езеро, Dojransko Ezero; Greek: Λίμνη Δοϊράνη, Límni Dhoïráni)	Greece/ North Macedonia
Lake Drūkšiai or Lake Drysviaty, Lake Drysvyaty, Drisvyaty (Belarusian: Дрысвяты; Russian: Дрисвяты)	Belarus/ Lithuania
Gaładuś Lake (Lithuanian: Galadusys)	Lithuania/ Poland
Gautelisvatnet	Norway/ Sweden
Lake Geneva	Switzerland/ France
Great St Bernard Lake	Switzerland/ Italy
Gresvatnet	Norway/ Sweden
Holderen	Norway/ Sweden
Lake Kilpisjärvi	Finland/ Sweden
Kingen	Norway/ Sweden
Kjårdavatnet	Norway/ Sweden
Klistervatnet	Norway/ Russia
Langvatnet	Norway/ Sweden
Lago di Lei (artificial lake)	Italy/ Switzerland
Leinavatn	Norway/ Sweden
Leirvatnet	Norway/ Sweden
Litlumvatnet	Norway/ Sweden
Lago di Livigno	Switzerland/ Italy
Lake Lugano	Switzerland/ Italy
Lake Maggiore	Switzerland/ Italy
Lough Melvin	United Kingdom/ Ireland
Lac de Moron	France/ Switzerland
Narva Reservoir (artificial lake)	Estonia/ Russia
Lake Neusiedl (German: Neusiedler See) or Fertő (Hungarian: Fertő tó; Croatian: Nežidersko jezero, Niuzaljsko jezero; Slovene: Nežidersko jezero; Slovak: Neziderské jazero)	Austria/ Hungary
Nowe Warpno Bay (Polish: Zatoka Nowowarpieńska)	Germany/ Poland
Lake Nuijamaa	Finland/ Russia
Lake Ohrid	Albania/ North Macedonia
Onkamojärvi	Finland/ Russia
Lake Ormož	Croatia/ Slovenia
Överuman	Norway/ Sweden
Lake Peipus (Estonian: Peipsi|-Pihkva järv; Russian: Псковско|-Чудское озеро, lit. 'Pskovsko|-Chudskoe lake', German: Peipussee)	Estonia/ Russia
Pitelis	Latvia/ Russia
Lake Prespa	Albania/ Greece/ North Macedonia
Small Prespa Lake	Albania/ Greece
Pyhäjärvi	Finland/ Russia
Rannasee or Rannastausee (artificial)	Austria/ Germany
Ranseren or Bije|-Ransarn (Swedish) or Bijjie Raentsere (Southern Sami)	Norway/ Sweden
Rengen	Norway/ Sweden
Rogen	Norway/ Sweden
Rostojávri	Norway/ Sweden
Siiddašjávri	Norway/ Sweden
Lake Skadar (Montenegrin: Skadarsko jezero, Скадарско језеро; Albanian: Liqeni i Shkodrës) — or Lake Scutari, Lake Shkodër and Lake Shkodra	Albania/ Montenegro
Stora Le	Norway/ Sweden
Svanevatn	Norway/ Russia
Szczecin Lagoon or Stettin Lagoon, Bay of Szczecin, Stettin Bay (Polish: Zalew Szczeciński, German: Stettiner Haff), also Oder lagoon (German: Oderhaff)	Germany/ Poland
Unna Guovdelisjávri	Norway/ Sweden
Lake Virmayarvi	Finland/ Russia
Lake Vištytis (Lithuanian: Vištyčio ežeras, German: Wystiter See, Russian: Виштынецкое озеро)	Lithuania/ Russia
Vuolep Sårjåsjávrre	Norway/ Sweden

== North America ==
River	State/Province	Bordering country
Lake Champlain (French: Lac Champlain; Abenaki: Pitawbagok; Mohawk: Kaniatarakwà:ronte)	Quebec /Vermont/ New York	Canada United States
Lake Erie	Ontario /Michigan/Ohio/Pennsylvania/ New York	Canada United States
Lake Huron	Ontario / Michigan	Canada United States
Lake Memphremagog (French: Lac Memphrémagog)	Quebec / Vermont	Canada United States
Lake Ontario	Ontario / New York	Canada United States
Lake St. Clair	Ontario / Michigan	Canada United States
Lake Superior (French: lac Supérieur; Ojibwe: ᑭᑦᒉᐁ-ᑲᒣᐁ, romanized: Gitchi-Gami)	Ontario / Minnesota/Wisconsin / Michigan	Canada United States
Beau Lake	Quebec/Maine	Canada United States
Boundary Lake	Manitoba/North Dakota	Canada United States
Chiputneticook Lakes (consisting of East Grand Lake, North Lake, Mud Lake, Spednic Lake, and Palfrey Lake)	New Brunswick/Maine	Canada United States
East Grand Lake	New Brunswick /Maine	Canada United States
Hanging Lake	British Columbia/Washington	Canada United States
Lake Koocanusa (artificial)	British Columbia/Montana	Canada United States
Lake of the Woods	Ontario / Manitoba/Minnesota	Canada United States
Osoyoos Lake	British Columbia/Washington	Canada United States
Rainy Lake	Minnesota/ Ontario	Canada United States
Ross Lake	British Columbia/Washington	Canada United States
Saganaga Lake	Ontario /Minnesota	Canada United States
Spednic Lake	New Brunswick/Maine	Canada United States
Waterton Lake	Alberta/Montana	Canada United States
Amistad National Recreation Area	Tamaulipas/Texas	Mexico United States
Etang Saumâtre		Haiti Dominican Republic
Falcon International Reservoir (artificial)	Coahuila /Texas	Mexico United States
Lake Güija		El Salvador Guatemala
Simpson Bay Lagoon	Saint Martin / Sint Maarten	France Netherlands

== South America ==
River	Bordering countries
Cami Lake	Argentina/ Chile
Cochrane/Pueyrredón Lake	Argentina/ Chile
La Gaiba Lake (Span. Laguna La Gaiba)	Bolivia/ Brazil
General Carrera Lake (Argentine side: Lake Buenos Aires)	Argentina/ Chile
Mandioré Lake (Spanish: Laguna Mandioré)	Bolivia/ Brazil
Marfil Lake (Baia Grande)	Bolivia/ Brazil
Lagoon Mirim	Brazil/ Uruguay
Mirim Lake / Lagoon Mirim	Bolivia/ Brazil
O'Higgins/San Martín Lake	Argentina/ Chile
Lake Parinacota	Bolivia/ Peru
Suches Lake or Lago Suches	Bolivia/ Peru
Lake Titicaca	Bolivia/ Peru
Uberaba Lake	Bolivia/ Brazil
Vintter Lake or Palena Lake (Arg.: Lago Palena)	Argentina/ Chile

== See also ==
- List of international river borders
- International waters
- List of divided islands
