= Marfil =

Marfil (Spanish "ivory") may refer to:

- Marfil (band), a Costa Rican music group
- Marfil (film), a 2011 documentary from Equatorial Guinea
- Marfil Lake, a lake on the border between Brazil and Bolivia
- Marfil Tekstil (company), a fabric wholesaler located in Istanbul, Turkey
- Marfil or Marfeil, an uthra in Mandaeism
