= Buenos Aires Lake =

Buenos Aires Lake may refer to:

- General Carrera Lake / Buenos Aires Lake, Argentina
- Buenos Aires Lake (Bolivia)
