= Mirim Lake =

Mirim Lake may refer to:

- Mirim Lake (Bolivia)
- Mirim Lake (Brazil)
