= Lake of Maracaibo =

Lake of Maracaibo may refer to:

- Maracaibo Lake (Bolivia)
- Lake Maracaibo, Venezuela
