= Aquicuana Reserve =

Bolivian nature reserve

The Aquicuana Municipal Reserve is a protected natural reserve located about 20 km from the city of Riberalta in the Beni department in northern Bolivia and in the Amazon. It is home to Lake San José, a medicinal retreat center, Pisatahua, and two communities, San José and Warnes. Its name, Aquicuana, comes from the ancestral name of the lake which was before named Aquicuana in the Tacana language and means the place of big trees.

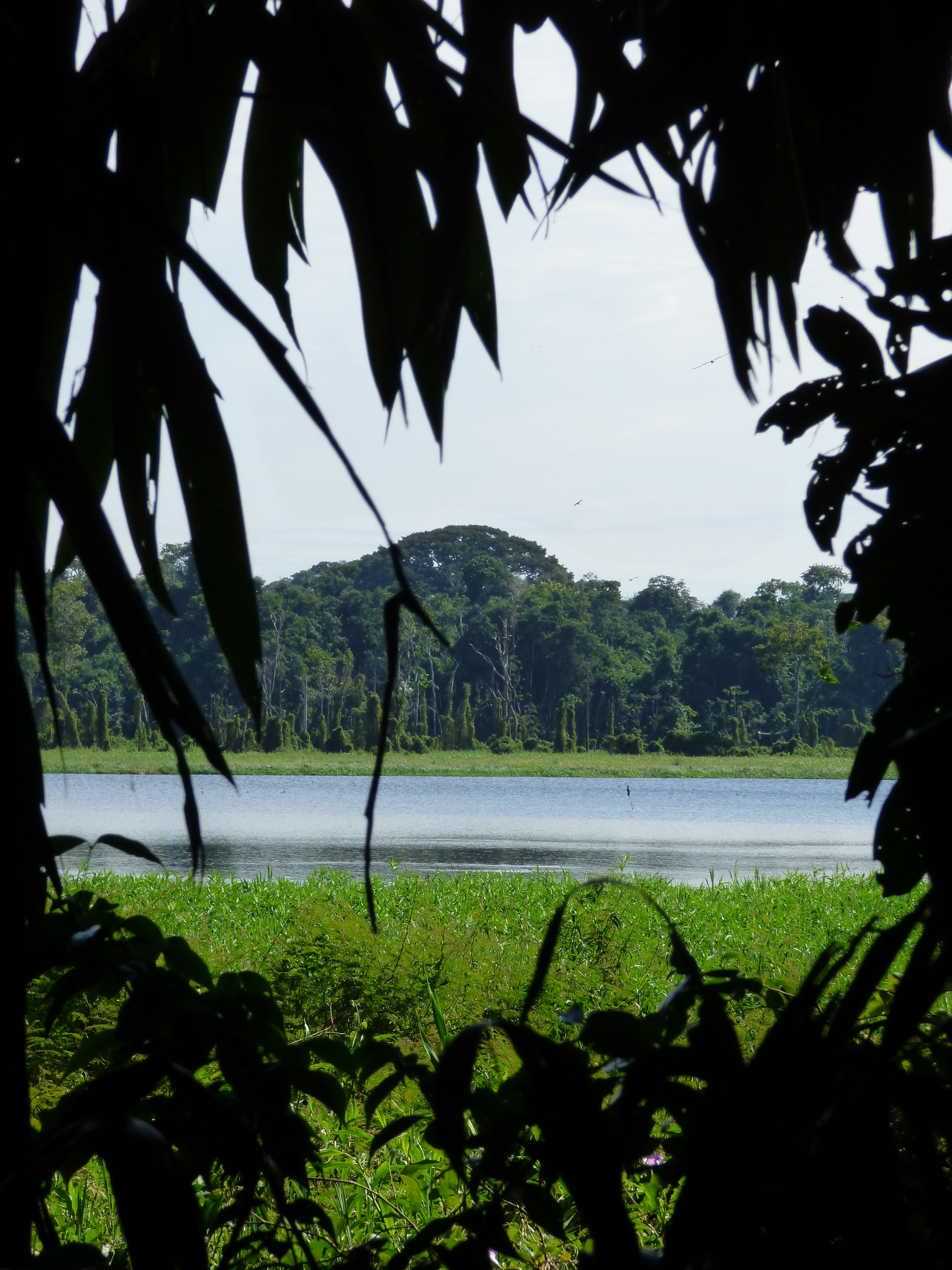
View of Lago San Jose through the jungle, Aquicuana Reserve, El Beni

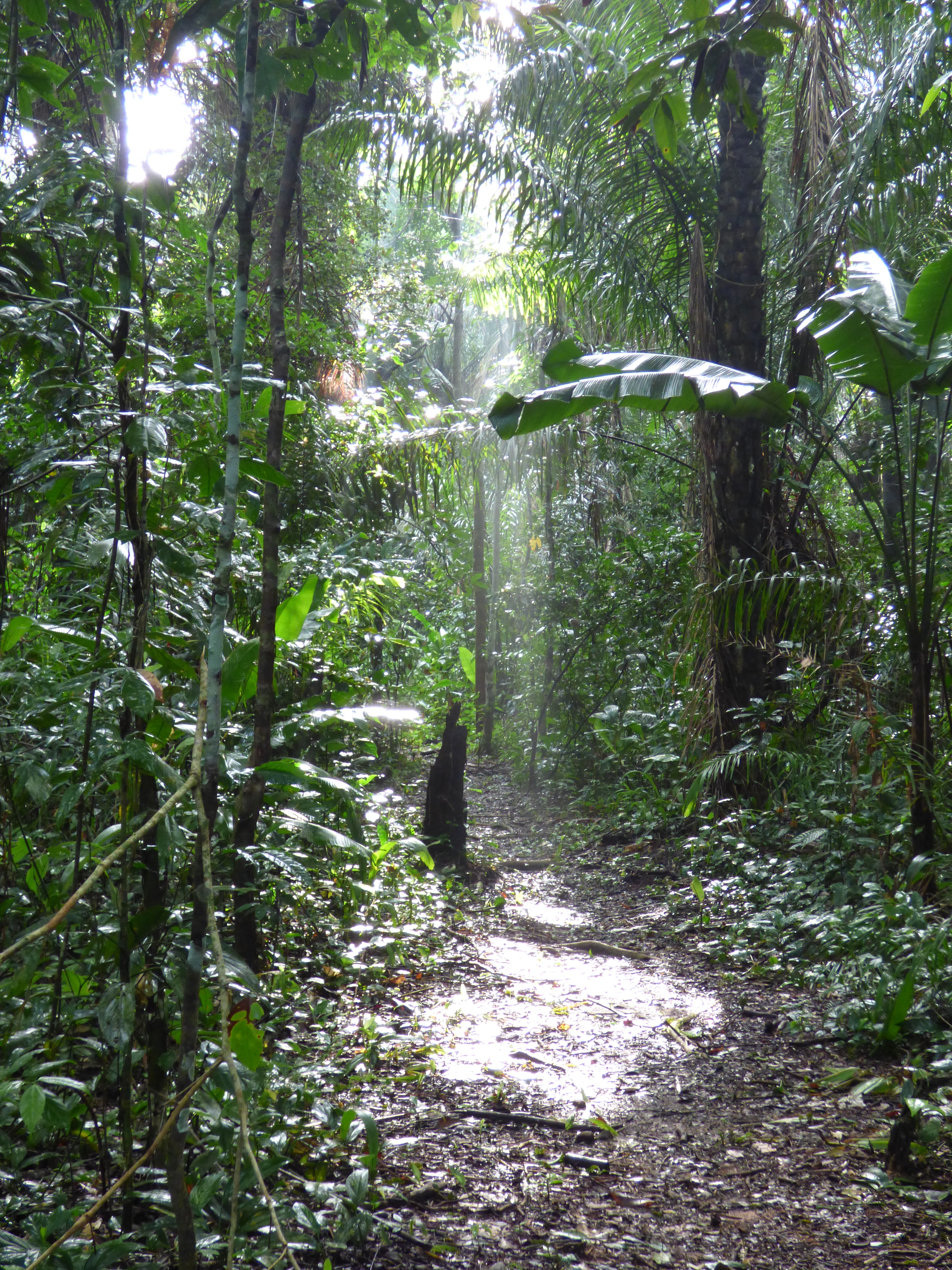
Hiking trail at Aquicuana Reserve, El Beni

== History ==
In 1995 when the municipality of Riberalta put in place a first law to protect the San José Lake. Then in 2004 the municipality extended the borders of the reserve to 1,600 Hectares.

In 2016, with the collaboration between the local communities, the municipality of Riberalta and the associations Sustainable Bolivia and Fundación Amazonia the reserve expanded to reach more than 20,000 hectares. The objective of making it an official reserve was to protect it from agricultural expansion and intensive livestock farming, deforestation, mining and extraction of its natural resources while allowing both communities to live with dignity there.

Location The reserve is located in the Amazon forest, in the Beni department in Bolivia in the Vaca Diez province. The reserve is also close to the border of the Pando Department and Brazil. Close to the city of Riberalta (also called the Bolivian Amazonian capital) you can go there by taxi (motorcycle or car).

== Climate ==
Like any reserve in the rainforest, Aquicuana has an environment and a tropical and humid climate. It is hot and humid from October to April and dry but still warm from May to September. Temperatures do not exceed 35 degrees but can fall below 20 degrees when cold from the southern winds comes. Nevertheless, during the wet season it can rain up to 4000 mm.

== Biodiversity of the reserve ==
The reserve contains a large amount of the Amazonian biodiversity, and a few research have been made on the topic. For the moment, a complete inventory is not possible. This reserve ensures the protection of nature but it also allows its observation.

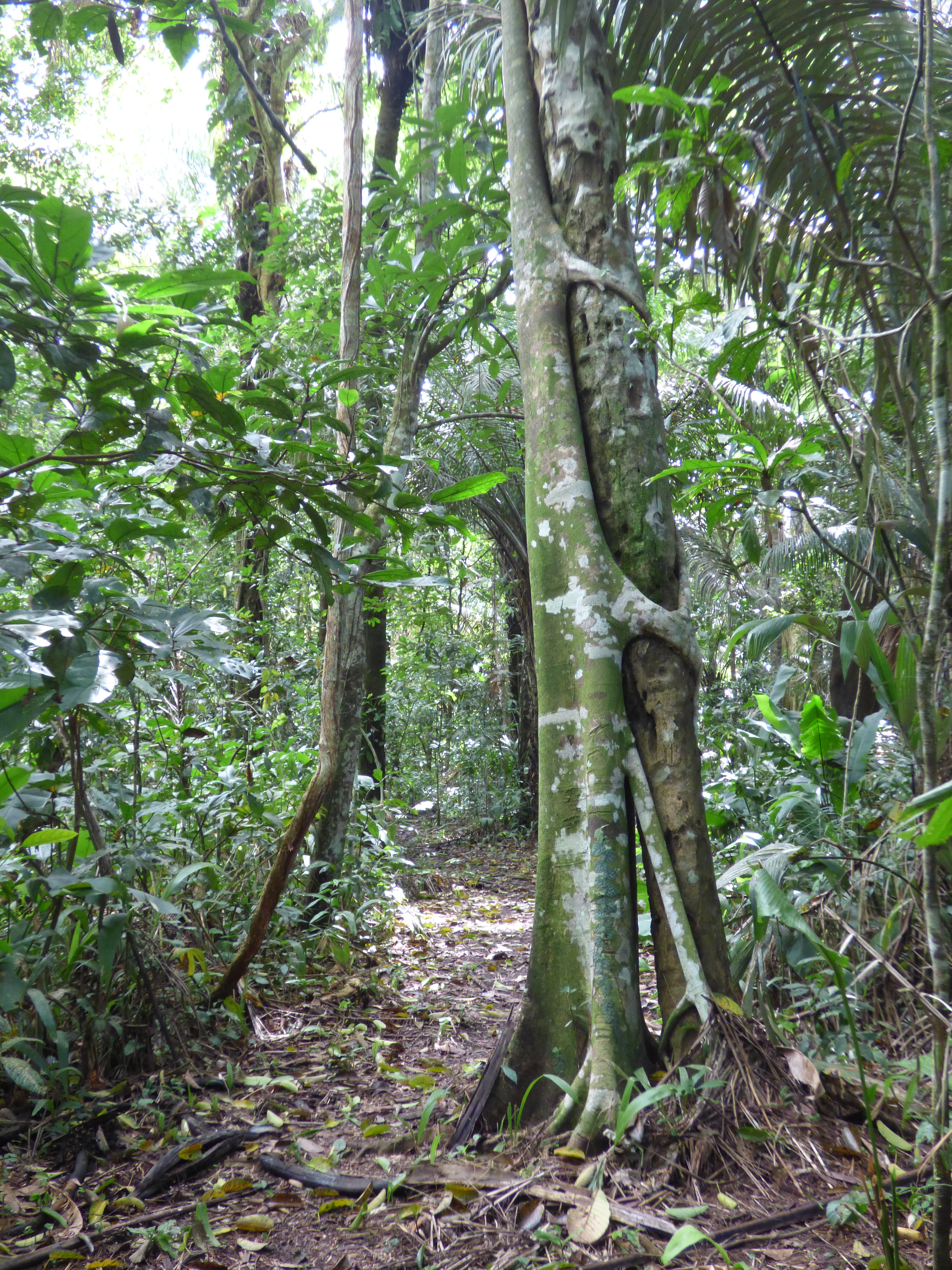
Strangler fig at Aquicuana Reserve, El Beni

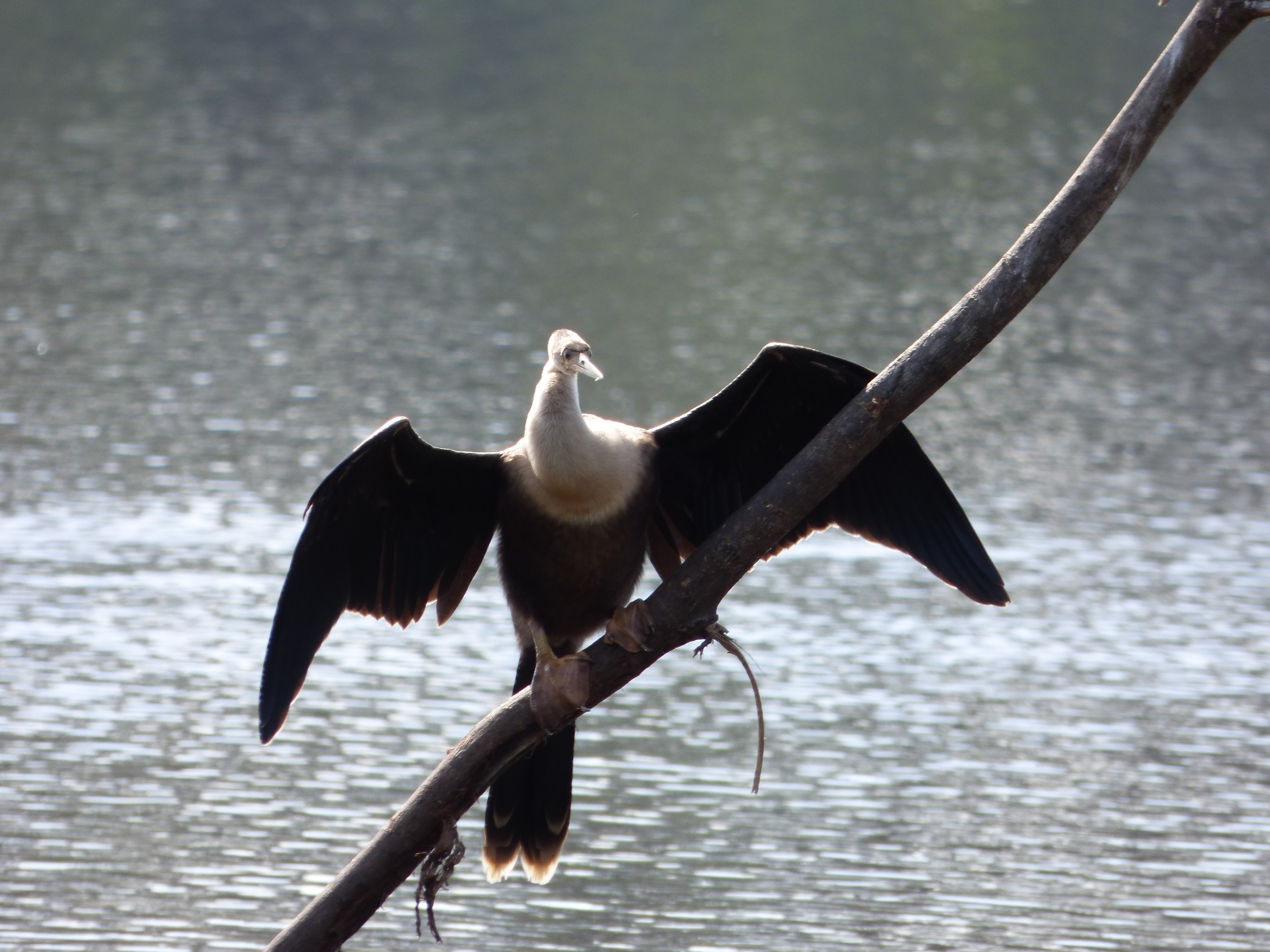
Anhinga drying off at Lago San Jose, El Beni

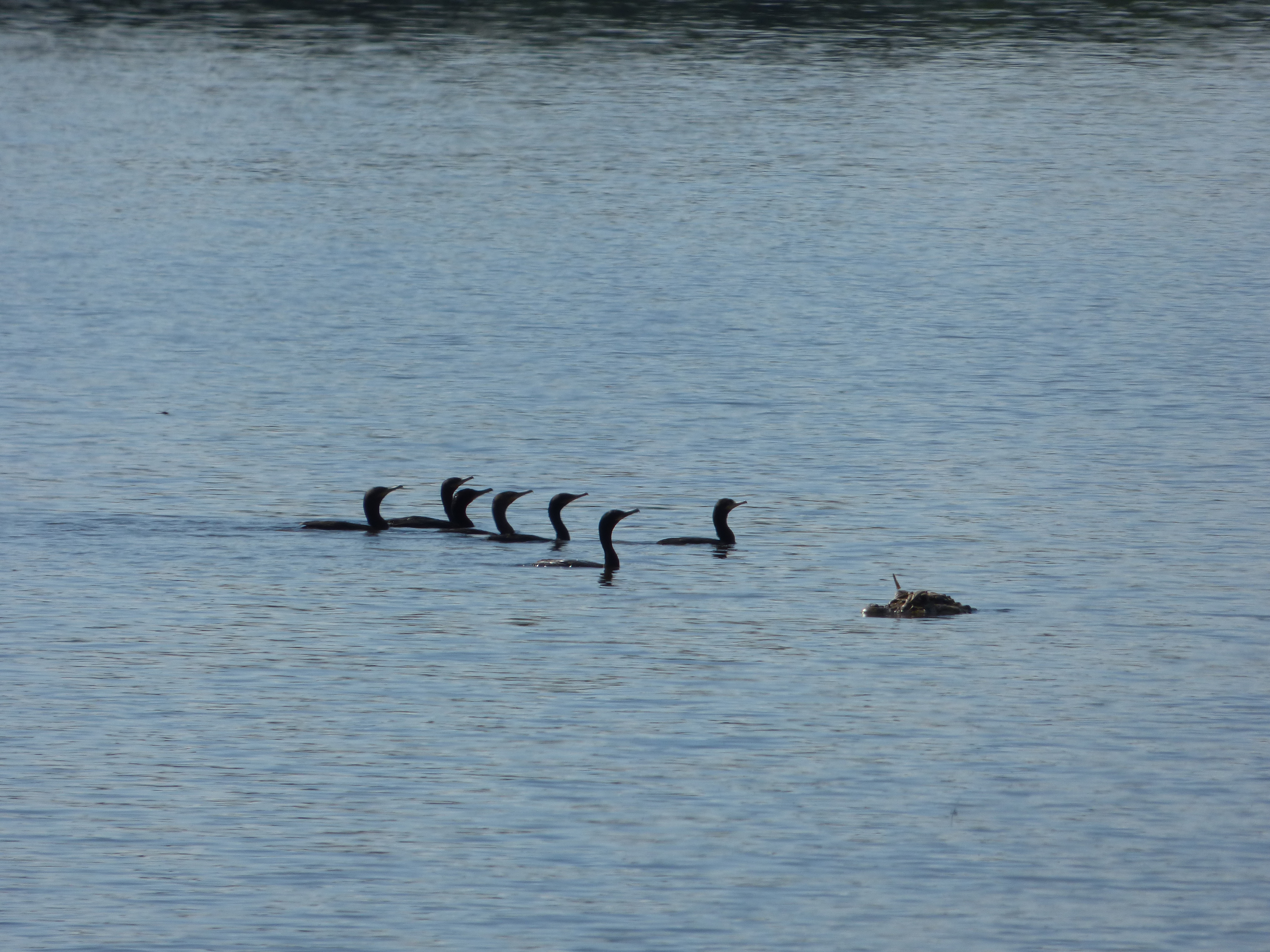
A group of neotropic cormorants cautiously approach a black caiman at Lago San Jose, El Beni

=== Mammals ===
The most well-known and recognized mammals in the reserve are jaguars, armadillos and monkeys ( black head squirrel monkey, howler monkey).

=== Amphibians ===
There are about forty types of frogs present in the reserve which have been listed. We can mention the "Rana verde" Phyllomedusa camba. It can measure up to 83 millimeters. It is known for its slowness and difficulties to jump. From its pretty light green color it is easily recognizable. We can also mention the Pipa Pipa or also call Common suriname toad. It has the distinction of not making love songs to attract females but of snapping a bone in its throat instead.

=== Birds ===
The reserve now counts more than 330 different types of birds. Among the most known birds in the reserve is the Collared aracari better known as the Tucanillo. This toucan is easily recognizable thanks to its yellow underparts with a red-brown band and is brown on the side of its head. There is also the Scarlet Macaw also very easily recognizable thanks to its colors. It is one of the four species of Ara visible in the reserve. And finally it is also possible to see a rare and endemic species of the region: Masked Antpitta (Hylopezus auricularis). It is classified as "Vulnerable" by the International Union for Conservation of Nature (IUCN) because of its very small range. It only exits in Riberalta and around. It has a dark brown "mask" around the eyes under a gray crown with a ridged groove and olive-brown upperparts.

=== Insects ===
Like any parts of the Amazon, Aquicuana is full of insects. Among the most recognizable and easily identifiable are butterflies. The red band Biblis Hyperia is widely spread with a wingspan of 51 mm to 76 mm, its hind wings are much festooned. The reverse is a lighter brown with a pink band. Morpho deidamia is also very present in the reserve.

=== Spiders ===
The Aquicuana Reserve hosts a variety of spider species representative of northern Bolivia's Amazon region, including some Brazilian species such as the Brazilian wandering spider (Phoneutria) and several types of tarantula, notably the pinktoe tarantula (Avicularia) and black tarantulas. These spiders are relatively easy to spot throughout the reserve. Tarantulas nests are most commonly found on palm trees, which offer an ideal habitat for shelter and hunting.

== The communities ==
Two communities have lived in the reserve for several years: Warnes and San José. They both have a democratic election system to elect community presidents. Both live reserve resources such as agriculture and fishing.

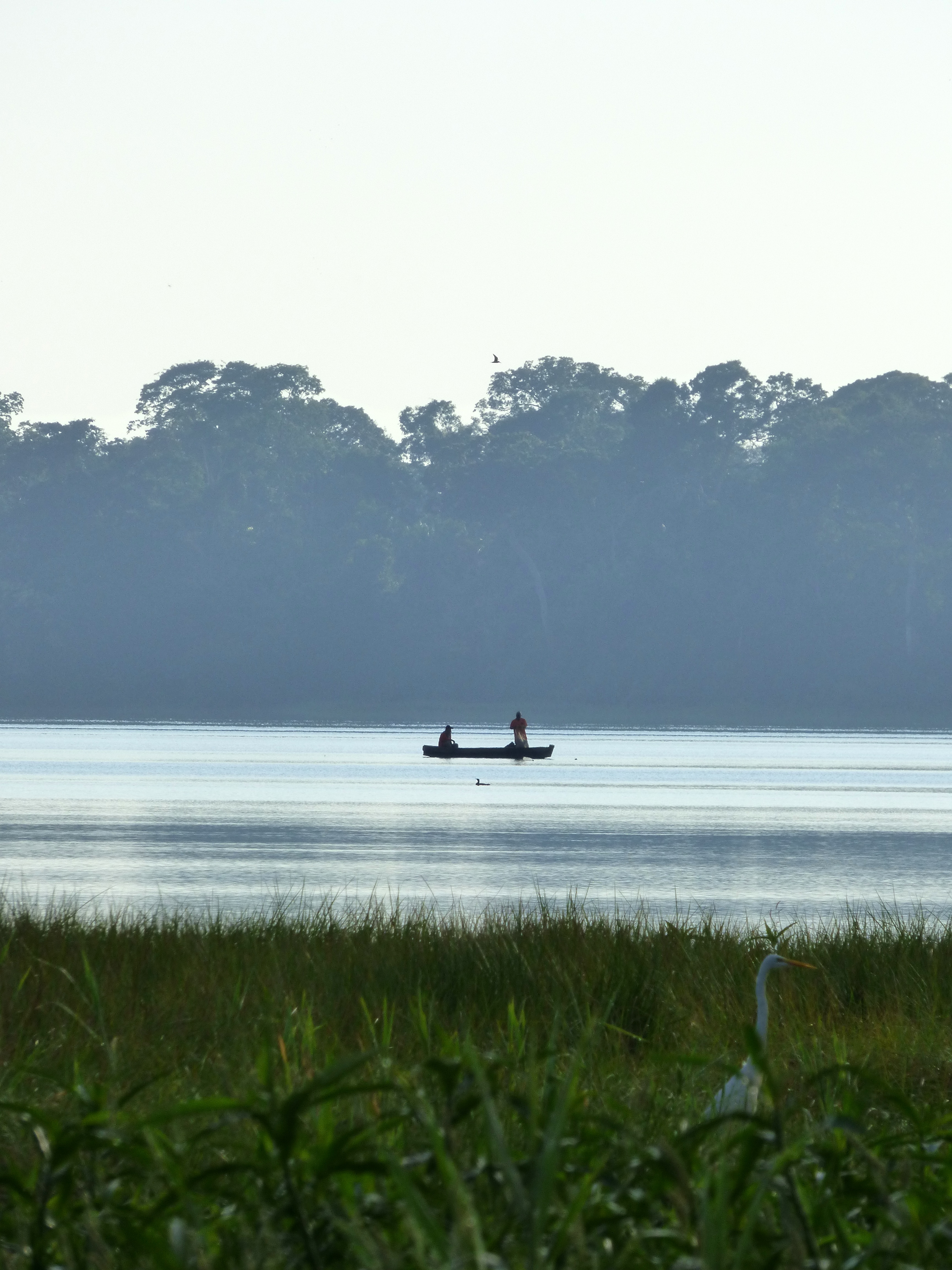
Fishermen at Lago San Jose, El Beni

=== Warnes ===
The community of Warnes was created in 1957 by farmers who wanted to live in a community with fewer people. They were seduced by the setting offered by this environment and in order to have access to education and water, they formalized the community on 16 June 1957.

The community lives exclusively from the exploitation of natural resources. The cultivation of the land, the harvesting of the Brazil nut, the fishing and the breeding rhythm the daily life of the inhabitants of the community.

=== San Jose ===
The community of San José is less accessible than the community of Warnes. It is therefore less developed and structured. It was founded in 1975 by 15 families who settled near the lake for the exploitation of rubber. Indeed, the company "Casa Suarez" (see Nicolás Suárez Callaú) was very present at that time in the region and employed many people. Despite the almost instantaneous cessation of rubber production, the community remained on these lands.

Today the community has 27 families, about 200 people. The community also lives on rice, banana and Yucca crops. Anything that is not consumed is sold on the Riberalta market. And just like in Warnes the president of the community is elected for 2 years by the heads of families (men and women).

== Ecotourism ==
The communities organized themselves to provide the tours for tourists wishing to explore the Amazon rainforest. The idea is to make sure tourists can visit the reserve while respecting the nature.

== Pisatahua ==
Pisatahua is an integrative retreat of plant medicine and ayahuasca, located in the reserve itself. This environment offers a setting immersed in the Amazon jungle, while working with traditional medicinal plants.
