= Chilata Lake =

Natural lake in La Paz Department, Bolivia

Laguna Chilata
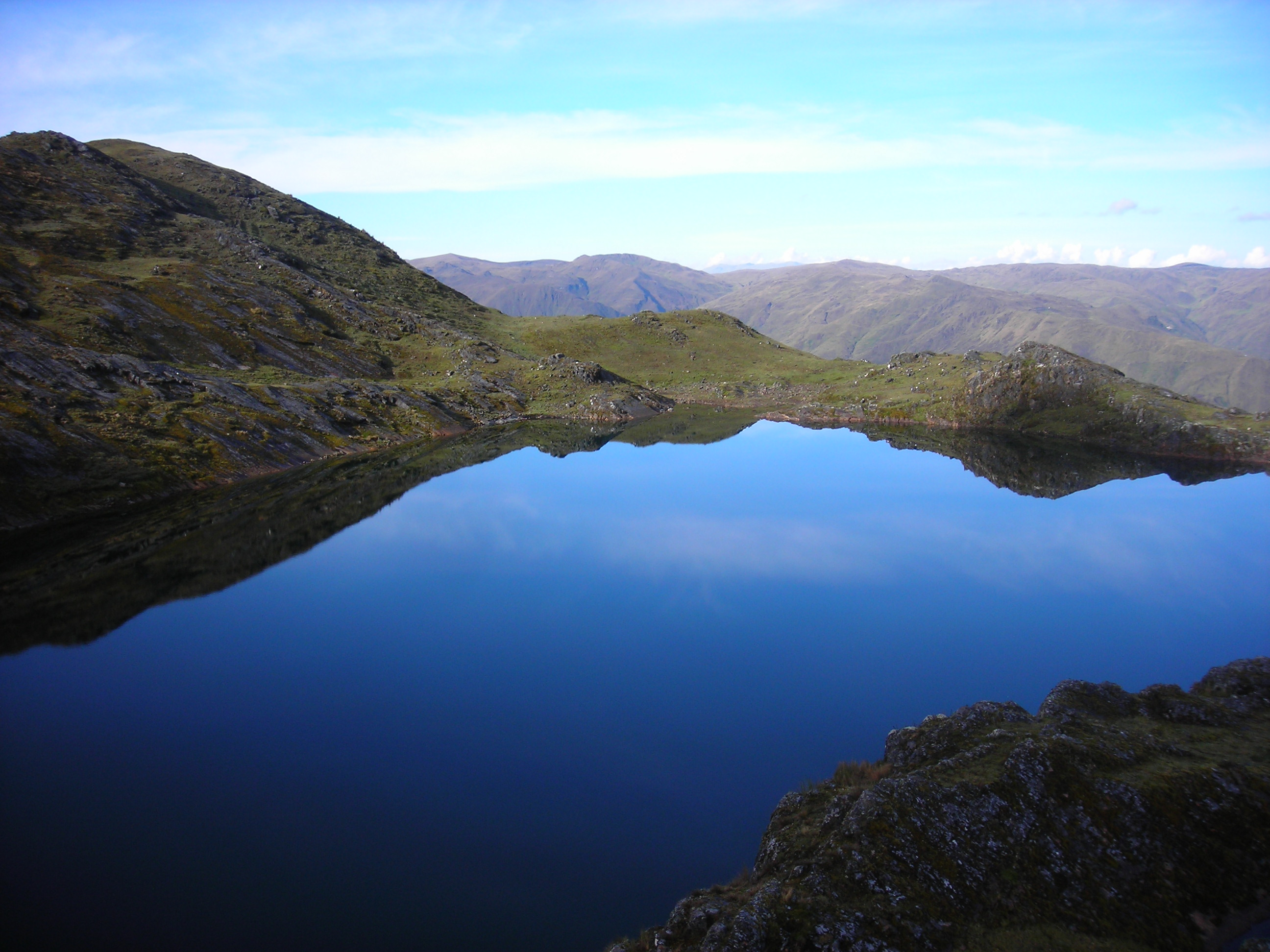
- View of the lake

- Location within Bolivia Location within South America
- Interactive map of Laguna Chilata
- Location: Larecaja Province, La Paz Department
- Coordinates: 15.6798°S 68.6014°W
- Type: natural lake
- Basin countries: Bolivia
- Max. length: 355 metres (1,165 ft)
- Max. width: 225 metres (738 ft)
- Surface area: 0.05 km^{2} (0.019 sq mi)
- Surface elevation: 5,030 m (16,500 ft)

Laguna Chilata (also spelled Chillata), is a lake in the Larecaja Province, La Paz Department, Bolivia. At an elevation of 5030 m, its surface area is 0.05 km².

The Lake is part of the Cordillera Real mountain range; it is often accessed, visited and viewed after a full-day hike/tour that starts in Sorata with a transfer or overnight stay to the Laguna Chilata, or directly on foot from the village (longer and more challenging) up to Camparmento Laguna Chilata, which takes approximately 6 hours.
