= Coranto Lake =

Lake in Potosí Department, Bolivia

- Location within Bolivia Location within South America
- Interactive map of Coranto Lake
- Location: Sur Lípez Province, Potosí Department
- Coordinates: 22°12′S 66°56′W
- Basin countries: Bolivia
- Surface area: 7.6 km^{2} (2.9 sq mi)
- Surface elevation: 4,382 m (14,377 ft)

Coranto Lake is a lake in the San Pablo de Lípez Municipality and San Antonio de Esmoruco Municipality of the Sur Lípez Province, Potosí Department, Bolivia. At an elevation of 4,382 m, its surface area is 7.6 km^{2}.
