= Pajaral Lake =

Lake in Bolivia

- Location within Bolivia Location within South America
- Interactive map of Pajaral Lake
- Location: Beni Department
- Coordinates: 14°57′S 63°31′W
- Basin countries: Bolivia
- Surface area: 9.3 km^{2} (3.6 sq mi)
- Surface elevation: 200 m (660 ft)

Pajaral Lake or Laguna Pajaral is a Bolivian Amazon freshwater lagoon located to the north of the department of Santa Cruz, near it border with the department of Beni.

== Geography ==
Laguna Pajaral has an area of 9.3 square kilometers and a round shape. Its elevation is 200 m.
