= Cacha Lake =

Lake in the La Paz Department, Bolivia

- Location within Bolivia Location within South America
- Interactive map of Cacha Lake
- Location: La Paz Department
- Coordinates: 15°58′18″S 68°30′39″W
- Basin countries: Bolivia
- Surface area: 0.72 km^{2} (0.28 sq mi)
- Surface elevation: 4,670 m (15,320 ft)

Cacha Lake is a lake in the La Paz Department, Bolivia. At an elevation of 4,670 meters, its surface area is 0.72 square kilometers.
