= Mentiroso Lake =

Lake in Pando Department, Bolivia

- Location within Bolivia Location within South America
- Interactive map of Mentiroso Lake
- Location: Pando Department
- Coordinates: 11°5′50″S 66°34′22″W
- Primary outflows: Río Madre de Dios
- Basin countries: Bolivia
- Surface area: 6.9 km^{2} (2.7 sq mi)
- Surface elevation: 140 m (460 ft)

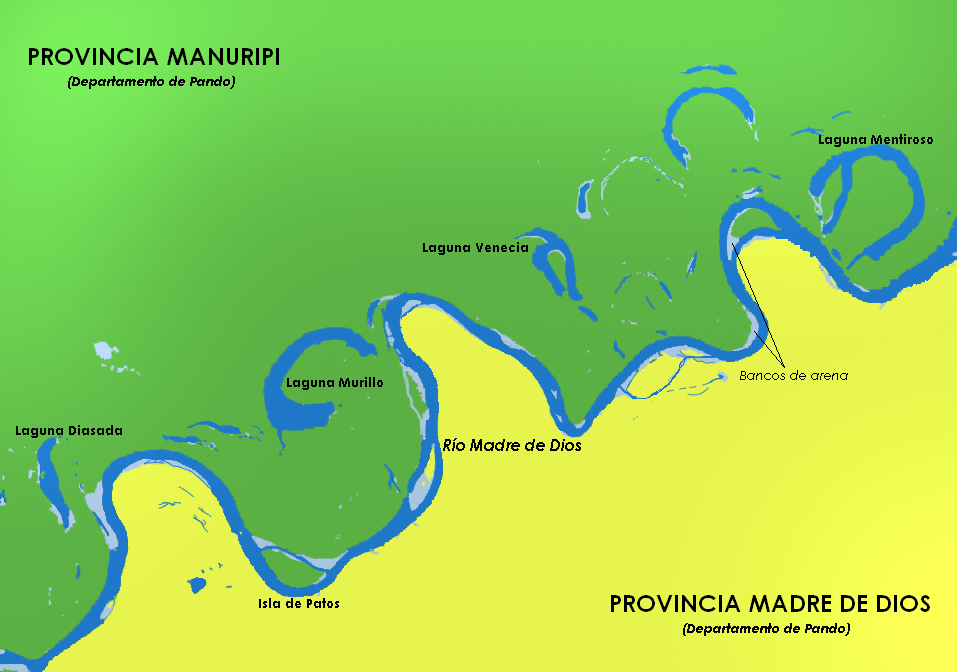
Map of the Madre de Dios river as it passes through the Murillo, Vencecia, Mentiroso lagoons, between the provinces of Manuripi and Madre de Dios in the department of Pando (Bolivia).

Mentiroso Lake is a lake in the Pando Department, Bolivia. At an elevation of 140 m, its surface area is 6.9 km^{2}.
