= Achiri Lake =

Lake in La Paz Department, Bolivia

Achiri
- Location within Bolivia Location within South America
- Interactive map of Achiri
- Location: La Paz Department
- Coordinates: 17°13′S 68°58′W
- Basin countries: Bolivia
- Surface area: 2.8 km^{2} (1.1 sq mi)
- Surface elevation: 3,876 m (12,717 ft)

Achiri (Aymara) is a lake in the La Paz Department, Bolivia. At an elevation of 3876 m, its surface area is 2.8 square kilometres (1.1 sq mi).
