= Pistola Lake =

Lake in Bolivia

Laguna Pistola
- Location within Bolivia Location within South America
- Interactive map of Laguna Pistola
- Location: Santa Cruz Department, Bolivia
- Coordinates: 16°13′S 63°27′W
- Basin countries: Bolivia
- Surface area: 33.52 km^{2} (12.94 sq mi)
- Shore length^{1}: 25.9 km (16.1 mi)
- ^{1} Shore length is not a well-defined measure.

Laguna Pistola is a lake in the Santa Cruz Department, Bolivia. Its surface area is 33.52 km² and a shore length of 25.9 km.
