= Larati Lake =

Lake in Bolivia

- Location within Cochabamba Location within Bolivia Location within South America
- Interactive map of Larati Lake
- Location: Cochabamba Department
- Coordinates: 17°20′39″S 66°01′21″W
- Basin countries: Bolivia
- Surface area: 1.36 km^{2} (0.53 sq mi)
- Surface elevation: 3,585 m (11,762 ft)

Larati Lake is a lake in the Cochabamba Department, Bolivia. At an elevation of 3585 m, its surface area is 1.36 km².
