= Unna Guovdelisjávri =

Lake in Sweden and Norway

Unna Guovdelisjávri (Northern Sami); Vuolip Čoarvejávri (Northern Sami)
- Interactive map of the lake
- Location: Narvik, Nordland; Kiruna, Norrbotten
- Coordinates: 68.0087°N 17.9254°E
- Basin countries: Norway; Sweden
- Max. length: 3.5 kilometres (2.2 mi)
- Max. width: 2 kilometres (1.2 mi)
- Surface area: 3.85 km^{2} (1.49 sq mi) (2.74 km² in Norway)
- Shore length^{1}: 14.9 kilometres (9.3 mi)
- Surface elevation: 918 metres (3,012 ft)
- References: NVE
- ^{1} Shore length is not a well-defined measure.

Unna Guovdelisjávri or Vuolip Čoarvejávri is a lake that is located on the border of Norway and Sweden. The Norwegian side lies in Narvik Municipality in Nordland county and the Swedish side lies in Kiruna Municipality in Norrbotten County. The lake lies just east of the lake Gautelisvatnet, about 35 kilometres (22 mi) southeast of the village of Elvegård in Norway. The ending -jávri is the word for "lake" in the Northern Sami language.

== See also ==
- List of lakes in Norway
