= Ventarrón Lake =

Lake in Bolivia

Laguna Ventarrón
- Location within Bolivia Location within South America
- Interactive map of Laguna Ventarrón
- Location: Ixiamas Municipality, Abel Iturralde Province, La Paz Department, Bolivia
- Coordinates: 12°23′27″S 68°23′24″W
- Basin countries: Bolivia
- Surface area: 2.5 km^{2} (0.97 sq mi)
- Surface elevation: 185 m (607 ft)

Laguna Ventarrón a lake in the Ixiamas Municipality, Abel Iturralde Province, La Paz Department, Bolivia. At an elevation of 185 m, its surface area is 2.5 km^{2}. Across the Madre de Dios River from the lake there is Ventarrón settlement in the Filadelfia Municipality, Manuripi Province, Pando Department, Bolivia.
