= Taborga Lake =

Lake in Bolivia

- Location within Bolivia Location within South America
- Interactive map of Taborga Lake
- Map
- Location: Santa Cruz Department
- Coordinates: 14°49′46″S 63°29′38″W
- Basin countries: Bolivia
- Surface area: 25.5 km^{2} (9.8 sq mi)
- Surface elevation: 200 m (660 ft)

Taborga Lake is a lake in the Santa Cruz Department, Bolivia. At an elevation of 200 m, its surface area is 25.5 km^{2}.
