= Tejas Lake =

Lake in Bolivia

Laguna Tejas
- Location within Bolivia Location within South America
- Interactive map of Laguna Tejas
- Location: Santa Cruz Department
- Coordinates: 16.056°S 64.330°W
- Basin countries: Bolivia
- Surface area: 5.41 km^{2} (2.09 sq mi)

Laguna Tejas is a lake in the Santa Cruz Department, Bolivia. Its surface area is 5.41 km².
