= Rodeo Lake =

Lake in Bolivia

Laguna Rodeo
- Embalse Rodeo
- Location within Cochabamba Location within Bolivia Location within South America
- Interactive map of Laguna Rodeo
- Location: Cochabamba Department
- Coordinates: 17°25′25″S 65°52′30″W
- Basin countries: Bolivia
- Surface area: 0.2 km^{2} (0.077 sq mi)
- Surface elevation: 3,485 m (11,434 ft)

Laguna Rodeo is a lake in the Cochabamba Department, Bolivia. At an elevation of 3485 m, its surface area is 0.2 km². It is 19 km by road to the Lake Corani major tourist center and fishing.
