= Tjårdavatnet =

Lake in Norway and Sweden

Tjårdavatnet (Norwegian); Čoađgejávri (Northern Sami)
- Interactive map of the lake
- Location: Narvik, Nordland; Gällivare, Norrbotten
- Coordinates: 68.1116°N 17.3635°E
- Basin countries: Norway; Sweden
- Max. length: 3 kilometres (1.9 mi)
- Max. width: 1.5 kilometres (0.93 mi)
- Surface area: 3.63 km^{2} (1.40 sq mi) (3.5 km² in Norway)
- Shore length^{1}: 8.92 kilometres (5.54 mi)
- Surface elevation: 616 metres (2,021 ft)
- References: NVE
- ^{1} Shore length is not a well-defined measure.

Tjårdavatnet (Norwegian) or Čoađgejávri (Northern Sami) is a lake that is located on the border of Norway and Sweden, about 15 kilometres (9.3 mi) south of the village of Elvegård in Norway. The Norwegian side lies in Narvik Municipality in Nordland county and the Swedish side lies in Gällivare Municipality in Norrbotten County. The lake has an area of about 3.63 square kilometres (1.40 sq mi), with 3.5 square kilometres (1.4 sq mi) being in Norway, the tiny remainder is in Sweden.

== See also ==
- List of lakes in Norway
