= Laguna Capina =

Lake in Bolivia

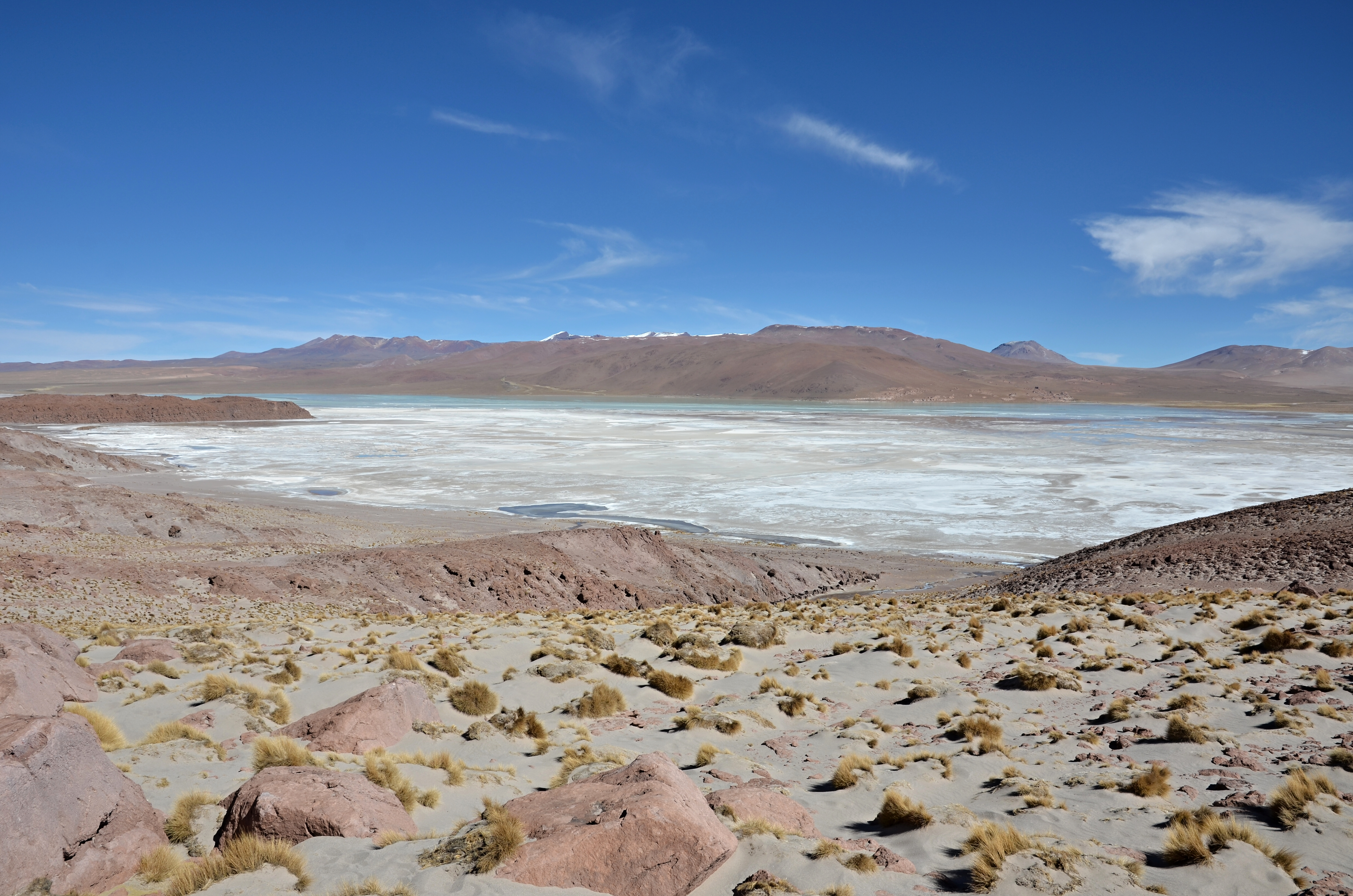

- Location within Bolivia Location within South America
- Interactive map of Laguna Capina
- Location: Bolivia
- Coordinates: 21°56′S 67°35′W
- Max. length: 7.4 km (4.6 mi)
- Max. width: 5.6 km (3.5 mi)
- Surface area: 23.8 km^{2} (9.2 sq mi)

Laguna Capina is a 23.8 km^{2} salt lake in the southwestern corner of Bolivia, near the border with Chile. The lake is 7.4 km long and 5.6 km wide and is located in the Bolivian department of Potosí, approximately 400 km south of the capital Sucre.

Laguna Capina is famous for its powerful earthquakes, which, on average, occur every 50 years with strength averaging 6-7 on the Richter scale. The lake is also known for its large numbers of puna flamingos (Phenicoparrus jamesi) and the extraction of borax (disodium tetraborate) at nearby mines. After the start of mining operations, the number of flamingos has dropped drastically.

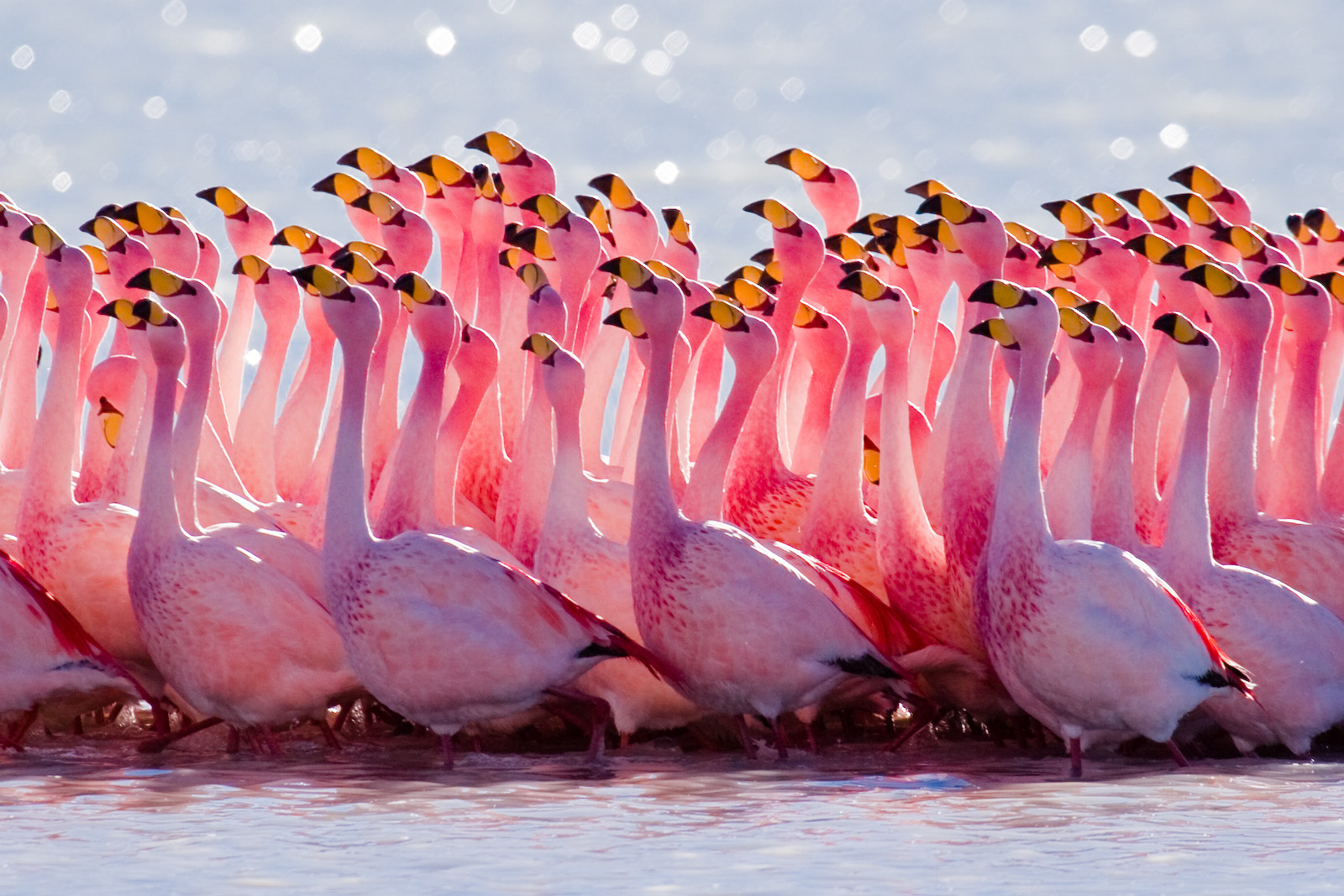
A group of puna flamingoes (Phoenicoparrus jamesi)

The area is not cultivated and the natural vegetation is mostly intact, but is fairly sparse. The soil is dark and rich in volcanic mass. The temperature varies little throughout the year, especially during the day. January is warmest, with a temperature of about 16 °C average in the middle of the day. June is coldest, with a temperature of about -10 °C average during the night.
