= Sajama Lake =

Laguna Sajama
- Location within Bolivia Location within South America
- Interactive map of Laguna Sajama
- Location: Oruro Department
- Coordinates: 18°02′S 68°57′W
- Basin countries: Bolivia
- Surface area: 0.3 km^{2} (0.12 sq mi)
- Surface elevation: 4,401 m (14,439 ft)

Laguna Sajama is a lake in the Oruro Department, Bolivia. Its surface area is 0.3 km^{2}.
