= Marfil (film) =

- Directed by: Rubén Monsuy Ndong Andeme
- Screenplay by: Rubén Monsuy Ndong Andeme
- Produced by: CCEM
- Cinematography: Arsenio Villete Boula Pascual Nvó Mituy
- Edited by: Rodrigo Nkogo Nsue Mayé Rubén Monsuy Ndong Andeme
- Music by: Betty Akna
- Release date: 2011
- Running time: 30 minutes
- Country: Equatorial Guinea

Marfil is a 2011 documentary film.

== Synopsis ==
The first filmmaker arrived in Equatorial Guinea in 1904. The last movie theatre closed in Malabo in the 1990s. In 2011, during the II African Film Festival of Equatorial Guinea, the Marfil Movie Theatre reopened its doors. Florencio, Ángel and Estrada tells us how cinema has been, and is still, present in their lives.
