= Pitelis =

Lake in Latvia and Russia

- Location within Latvia
- Location: Latvia–Russia border
- Coordinates: 56°36′7″N 28°2′19″E

Pitelis is a lake in Northern Europe. It is located on the border between Latvia and the Pskov Oblast of Russia.
