= Gautelisvatnet =

Lake on the border of Norway-Sweden

Gautelisvatnet (Norwegian); Guovdelisjávri (Northern Sami)
- Interactive map of the lake
- Location: Narvik Municipality, Nordland; Gällivare Municipality, Norrbotten
- Coordinates: 68.0302°N 17.8103°E
- Basin countries: Norway and Sweden
- Max. length: 12 kilometres (7.5 mi)
- Max. width: 3 kilometres (1.9 mi)
- Surface area: 17.67 km^{2} (6.82 sq mi) (17.66 km² in Norway)
- Shore length^{1}: 51.31 kilometres (31.88 mi)
- Surface elevation: 859 metres (2,818 ft)
- References: NVE
- ^{1} Shore length is not a well-defined measure.

Gautelisvatnet (Norwegian) or Guovdelisjávri (Northern Sami) is a lake that is located on the border of Norway and Sweden, about 50 kilometres (31 mi) southeast of the town of Narvik. The Norwegian side lies in Narvik Municipality in Nordland county and the Swedish side lies in Gällivare Municipality in Norrbotten County. The 17.67-square-kilometre (6.82 sq mi) lake has a dam on the northern end and the water is used for hydropower. After the dam was built, the lake grew and merged with the lake Vannaksvatnet to the south. The lake Unna Guovdelisjávri lies just to the east of this lake.

== See also ==
- List of lakes in Norway
