= Guayaques Lake =

- Location within Bolivia Location within South America
- Interactive map of Guayaques Lake
- Location: Eduardo Avaroa Andean Fauna National Reserve, Potosí Department
- Coordinates: 22°44′19″S 67°30′33″W
- Basin countries: Bolivia
- Surface area: 1.43 km^{2} (0.55 sq mi)

Guayaques Lake is a lake in the Eduardo Avaroa Andean Fauna National Reserve of the Potosí Department, Bolivia. Its surface area is 1.43 km^{2}.
