= Consuelo Lake =

Lake in Bolivia

Laguna Consuelo
- Location within Bolivia Location within Brazil Location within South America
- Interactive map of Laguna Consuelo
- Location: Santa Cruz Department
- Coordinates: 17°36′S 57°54′W
- Basin countries: Bolivia
- Surface area: 2.6 km^{2} (1.0 sq mi)

Laguna Consuelo is a lake in the Santa Cruz Department, Bolivia. Its surface area is 2.6 km^{2}.
