= Bahia Toco Largo Lake =

Lake in Bolivia

Laguna Bahia Toco Largo
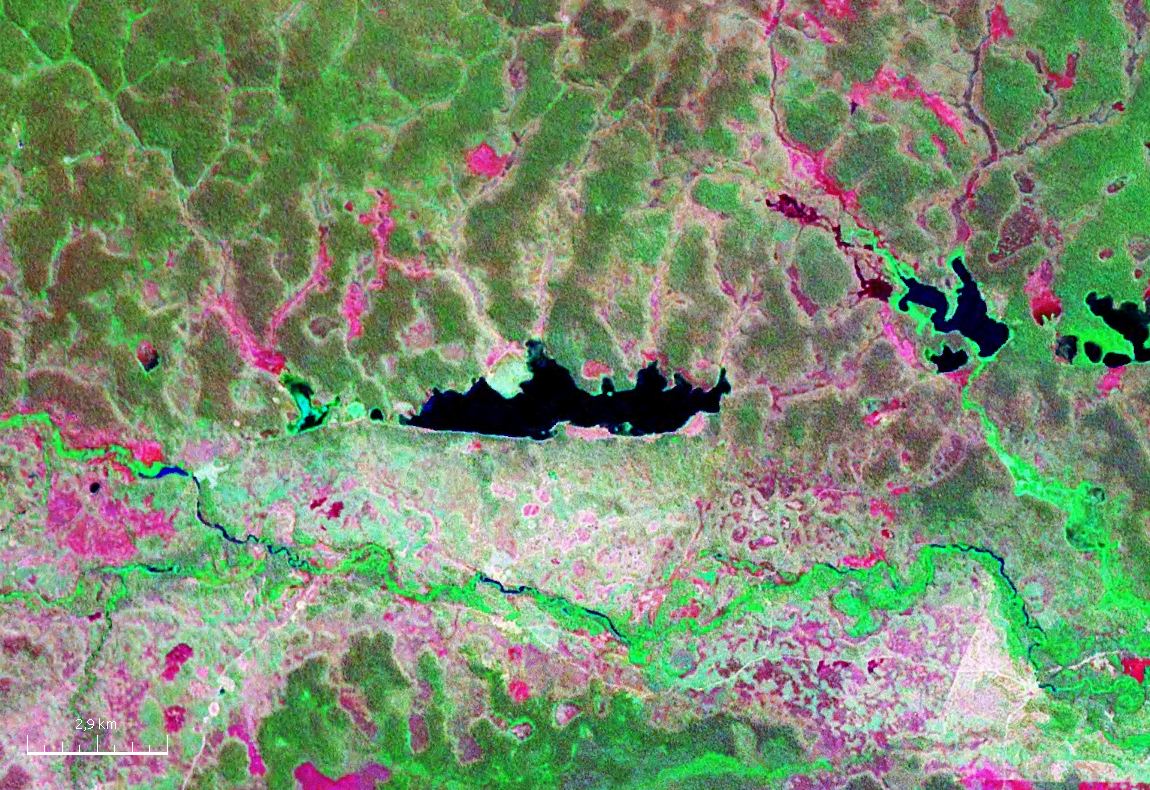
- Satellite picture of Bahía Toco Largo Lake (false colours)

- Location within Bolivia Location within Brazil Location within South America
- Interactive map of Laguna Bahia Toco Largo
- Location: José Miguel de Velasco Province, Santa Cruz Department
- Coordinates: 16°32′S 59°37′W
- Basin countries: Bolivia
- Surface area: 6.5 km^{2} (2.5 sq mi)
- Surface elevation: 165 m (541 ft)
- Islands: 4

Laguna Bahia Toco Largo is a freshwater lake in the José Miguel de Velasco Province, Santa Cruz Department, Bolivia. At an elevation of 165 m, its surface area is 6.5 km^{2}. The lake is part of the Río de la Plata Basin.
