= Mirim Lake (Bolivia) =

Lake in Bolivia and Brazil

Laguna Mirim
- Gaiba Mirim
- Location within Bolivia Location within Brazil
- Interactive map of Laguna Mirim
- Location: Santa Cruz Department, Bolivia/Mato Grosso, Brazil
- Coordinates: 17°46′S 57°49′W
- Primary inflows: Laguna La Gaiba
- Primary outflows: Laguna La Gaiba
- Basin countries: Bolivia, Brazil
- Surface area: 15.8 km^{2} (6.1 sq mi)

Laguna Mirim or Gaiba Mirim is a lake in Germán Busch Province, Bolivia and Mato Grosso, Brazil, being on the southern end of Bolivia's border with Brazil. Its surface area is 15.8 km^{2}.

The nearest major city is Bolivia's Santa Cruz de la Sierra.
