= List of lakes in Beni Department =

Map of the named lakes in this list
Some of the many named lakes in the Llanos de Moxos

This is a list of lakes in the Beni Department, Bolivia. The Beni Department lies largely within the Llanos de Moxos, a seasonally flooded tropical savanna of the upper Madeira River basin in the Bolivian Amazon. The Llanos de Moxos landscape includes forested natural levees (alturas), sparsely wooded backslopes (semialturas), and seasonally flooded interfluvial basins (bajíos), with forest islands scattered throughout. Several hundred perennial lakes occur across the region.

Most of the lakes are shallow — typically less than 2 m (6.6 ft) deep, with flat bottoms. Many are distinguished by rectangular or oval outlines and a northeast–southwest orientation; approximately 700 such geometric and 'oriented' lake basins have been identified in the Llanos de Moxos, covering about 1,900 km^{2} (730 sq mi) (2,600 km^{2} (1,000 sq mi) including dry lakes). Annual rainfall in the region ranges from 1,600 mm (63 in) to 3,500 mm (140 in), concentrated in a wet season from November to April. Satellite estimates from 1979 to 1987 put the area flooded across the Llanos de Moxos floodplain between 2,069 km^{2} (799 sq mi) and 78,460 km^{2} (30,290 sq mi), with a median of 23,383 km^{2} (9,028 sq mi).

The origin of the oriented lake shapes has been debated. A tectonic model proposed in 1964 argued that rectangular lake basins are surface expressions of subsiding or vibrating basement blocks. A 2014 study rebutted the basement blocks theory, proposing instead a process in which basin depressions were subsequently reshaped by wind and waves. Separately, neotectonic uplift along the southern margin of the Fitzcarrald Arch has been proposed as the origin of larger ria lakes such as El Océano Lake and Rogaguado Lake, whose basins formed as river drainage backed up behind rising knickpoints.

The lakes and waterways of the Llanos de Moxos have been modified by pre-Columbian peoples living in the Llanos de Moxos, who built networks of earthen fish weirs across the seasonally-flooded plains of Baures, as well as settlements linked by causeways and served by canals and reservoirs.

Some of the lakes in the Beni Department lie outside the Llanos de Moxos, in the Southwest Amazon moist forests or the Madeira–Tapajós moist forests.

== Aquiles Lake ==
Laguna Áquiles is a lake in the Beni Department, Bolivia. At an elevation of 224 m (735 ft), its surface area is 19 km^{2} (7.3 sq mi).

See on map

== Araré Lake ==
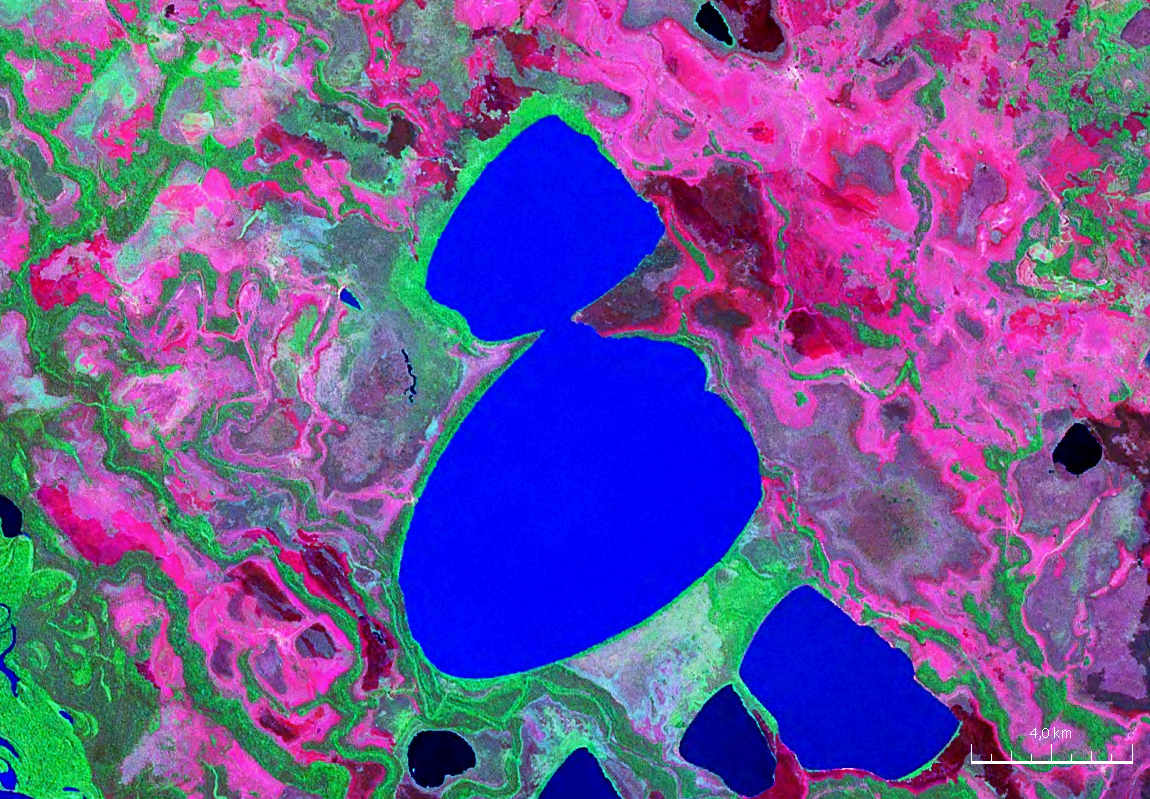
Laguna de Arani

Laguna de Arani or Laguna de Araré is a lake in the Marbán Province, Beni Department, Bolivia. At an elevation of 160 m (520 ft), its surface area is 68 km^{2} (26 sq mi).

See on map

== Aricare Lake ==
Laguna Aricare is a lake in the Beni Department, Bolivia. At an elevation of 180 m, its surface area is 10.33 km².

See on map

== Laguna Azul ==
Laguna Azul (Spanish for "blue lake" or "blue lagoon") is a lake in the Beni Department, Bolivia. Its surface area is 6.1 km^{2}.

It is in the Madeira–Tapajós moist forests ecoregion.

See on map

== Bolivia Lake ==
Laguna Bolivia is a lake in the Marbán Province, Beni Department, Bolivia. At an elevation of 166 m, its surface area is 11 km².

See on map

== Bravo Lake ==
Laguna Bravo is a seasonal lake in the Yacuma Province, Beni Department, Bolivia. At an elevation of 167 m, its surface area is 25.7 km².

See on map

== Buenos Aires Lake ==
Buenos Aires Lake is a lake in the Beni Department, Bolivia. At an elevation of 206 m, its surface area is 7.6 km².

It is in the Southwest Amazon moist forests ecoregion.

See on map

== Cachimbo Lake ==
Laguna Cachimbo is a lake in the Beni Department, Bolivia. At an elevation of 196 m, its surface area is 26.56 km². It lies near the Beni border with the Santa Cruz Department.

Its dimensions are approximately 5.48 km (3.41 mi) long by 5.41 km (3.36 mi) wide.

It is in the Southwest Amazon moist forests ecoregion.

See on map

== Carreras Lake ==
Laguna Carreras is a lake in the Beni Department, Bolivia. Its surface area is 13 km^{2}.

See on map

== El Encanto Lake ==
El Encanto Lake is a seasonal lake bordering Beni Department, Bolivia and Aguapeí, Vila Bela da Santíssima Trindade, State of Mato Grosso, Brazil. At an elevation of 170 m, its surface area is 4.5 km^{2}.

See on map

== Francia Lake ==
Francia Lake is a lake in the Beni Department, Bolivia. Its surface area is 5.6 square kilometres (2.2 sq mi).

It is in the Madeira–Tapajós moist forests ecoregion.

See on map

== Guachuna Lake ==
Guachuna Lake is a lake in the Yacuma Province, Beni Department, Bolivia. At an elevation of 150 m, its surface area is 102.8 km².

Its outflow is the San Miguel River.

See on map

== Las Habras Lake ==
Las Habras Lake is a lake in the Beni Department, Bolivia. At an elevation of 136 m, its surface area is 73 km^{2}.

It is in the Southwest Amazon moist forests ecoregion.

See on map

== Huachi Lake ==
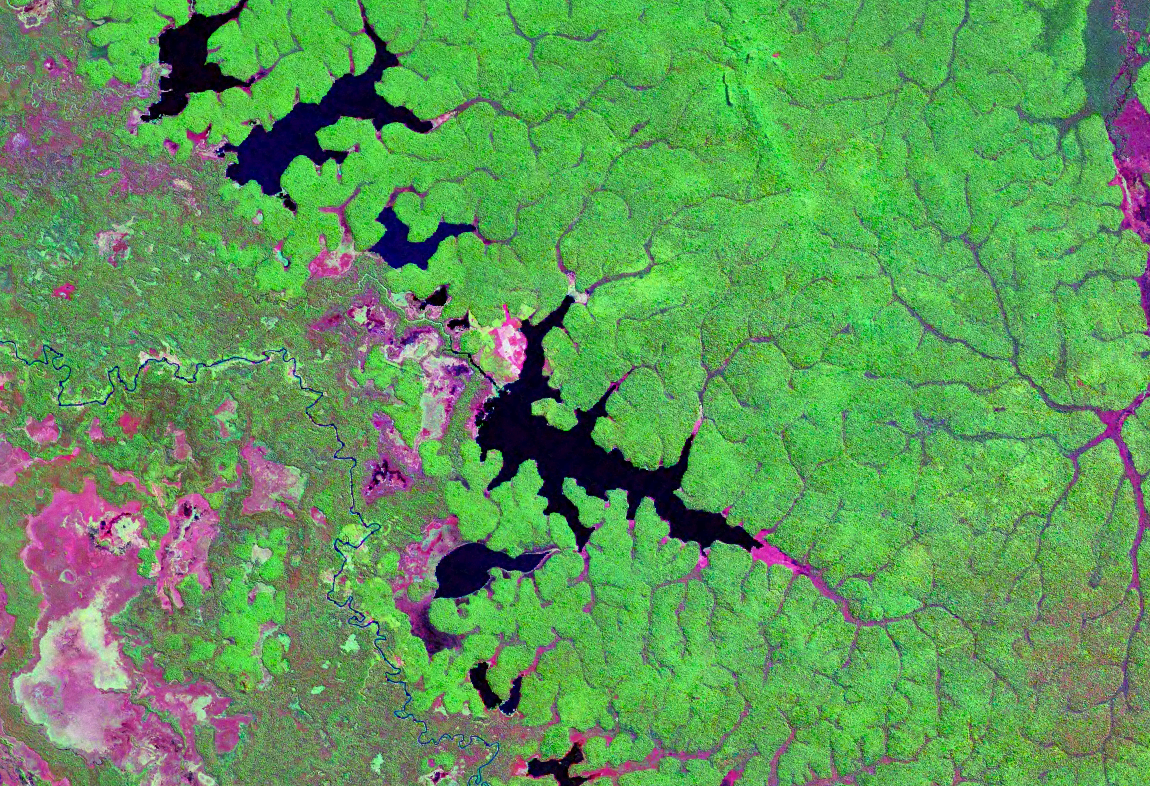
Laguna Huachi

Huachi Lake is a lake in the Beni Department, Bolivia. At an elevation of 173 m, its surface area is 67 km².

It is in the Madeira–Tapajós moist forests ecoregion.

See on map

== Huaytunas Lake ==
Huaytunas Lake is a lake in the Yacuma Province, Beni Department, Bolivia. At an elevation of 146 m, its surface area is 329.5 km².

Huaytunas Lake has two islands.

See on map

== Isirere Lake ==
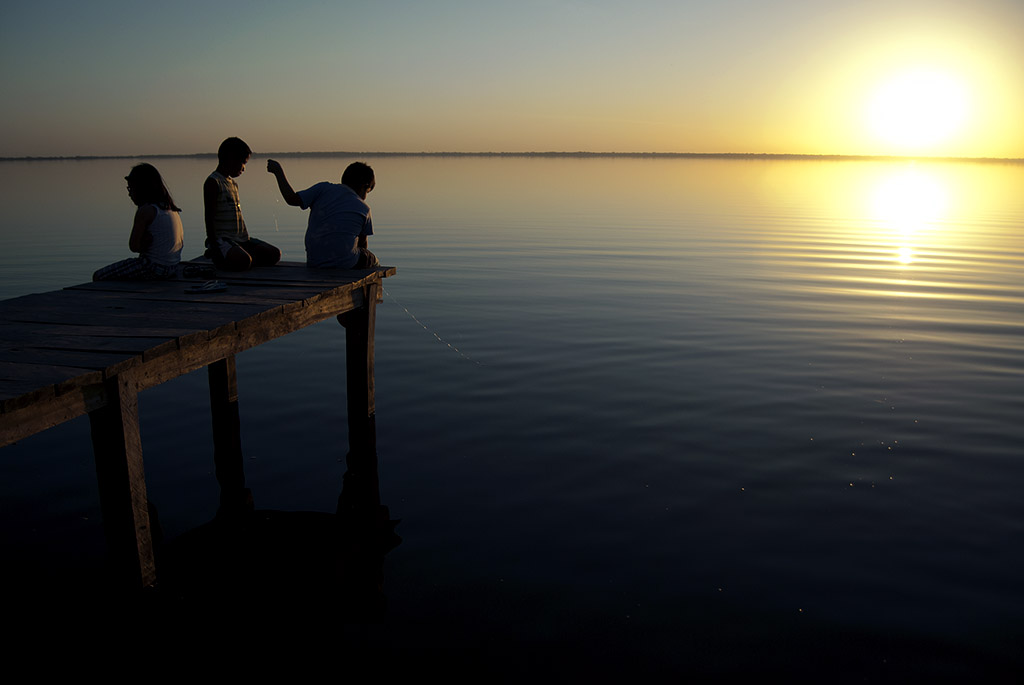
Laguna Isirere

Isirere Lake or Iserere Lake is a lake in the Beni Department, Bolivia. At an elevation of 258 m, its surface area is 19.3 km².

See on map

== Jara Lake ==
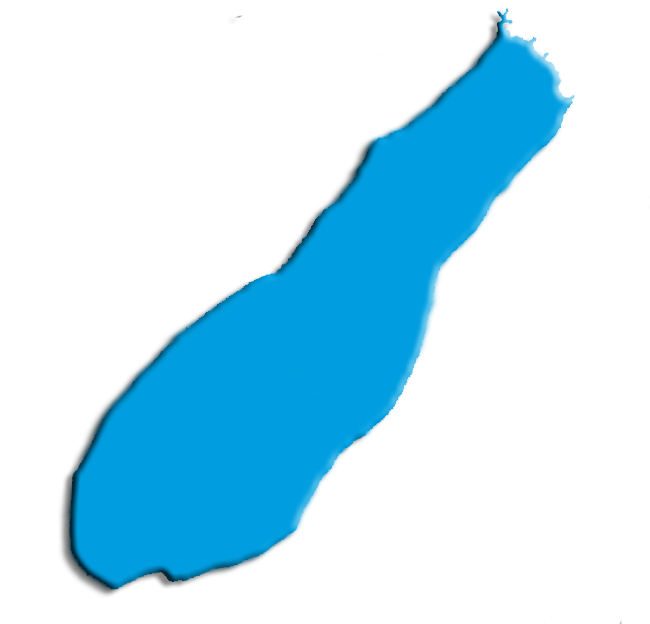
Laguna Jara depth map

Laguna Jara is a lake in the Beni Department, Bolivia. At an elevation of 191 m, its surface area is 16.5 km^{2}.

It is in the Madeira–Tapajós moist forests ecoregion.

Formerly, the Jorá language was spoken around the lake; it is now thought to be extinct.

See on map

== Laguna Larga ==
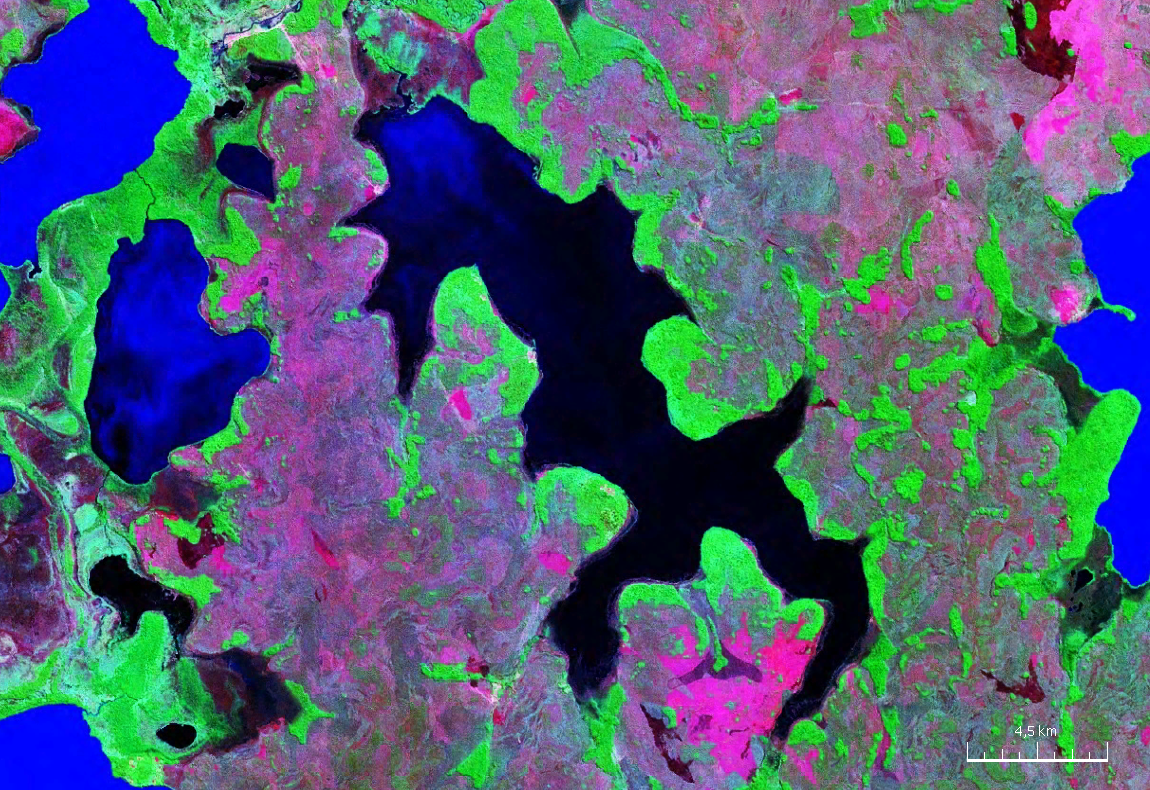
Satellite imagery of Laguna Larga

Laguna Larga is a lake in the Beni Department, Bolivia. At an elevation of 148 m, its surface area is 100 km^{2}.

See on map

== Mancornadas Lake ==
Laguna Mamornadas is a lake in the Beni Department, Bolivia. At an elevation of 163 m, its surface area is 74.16 km².

Mancornadas Lake has one island.

See on map

== Maracaibo Lake ==
Maracaibo Lake is a lake in the Cercado Province, Beni Department, Bolivia. At an elevation of 177 m, its surface area is 15.8 km^{2}.

It is in the Madeira–Tapajós moist forests ecoregion.

See on map

== Matuwal Lake ==
Laguna Matuwal is a lake in the east part of Beni Department, Bolivia. Its surface area is 6.83 km² and a coastal perimeter of 10.1 kilometers.

Matuwal lagoon is a Bolivian Amazon freshwater lagoon located near the town of Bella Vista.

See on map

== Navidad Lake ==
Navidad Lake is a lake in the Beni Department, Bolivia at an elevation of 160 m, with surface area 22.5 km^{2}.

See on map

== Nuevo Mundo Lake ==
Nuevo Mundo Lake is a lake bordering Beni Department and Santa Cruz Department. At an elevation of 180 m (590 ft), its surface area is 57.7 km^{2} (22.3 sq mi).

It is in the Southwest Amazon moist forests ecoregion.

See on map

== El Océano Lake ==
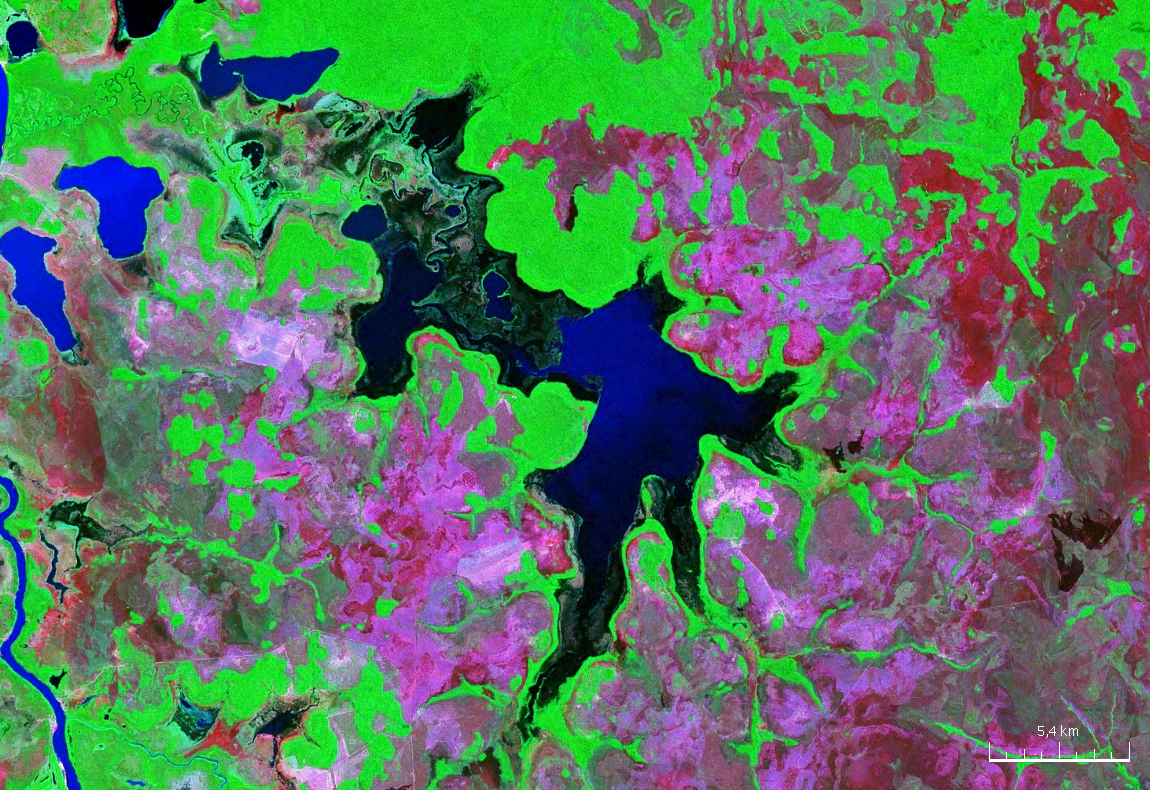
Laguna El Océano

El Océano Lake is a lake in area of Savajes Gentios in Beni Department, Bolivia. Its surface area is 100 km^{2}.

See on map

== Omoro Lake ==
Omoro Lake, also known as Laguna Omero, is an Amazon lagoon located in Canton Magdalena, Magdalena Municipality, Iténez Province, Beni Department, Bolivia. At an elevation of 193 m. It has an elongated shape, with dimensions of 4 km long by 2 km wide and a surface area of 6 km².

See on map

== Portia Lake ==
Laguna Portia is a lake in the Iténez Province, Beni Department, Bolivia. At an elevation of 200 m, its surface area is 28 km^{2}.

It is in the Madeira–Tapajós moist forests ecoregion.

See on map

== La Porfía Lake ==
Laguna La Porfía is a lake in the Yacuma Province, Beni Department, Bolivia. Its surface area is 58.5 km^{2}.

See on map

== Rogagua Lake ==
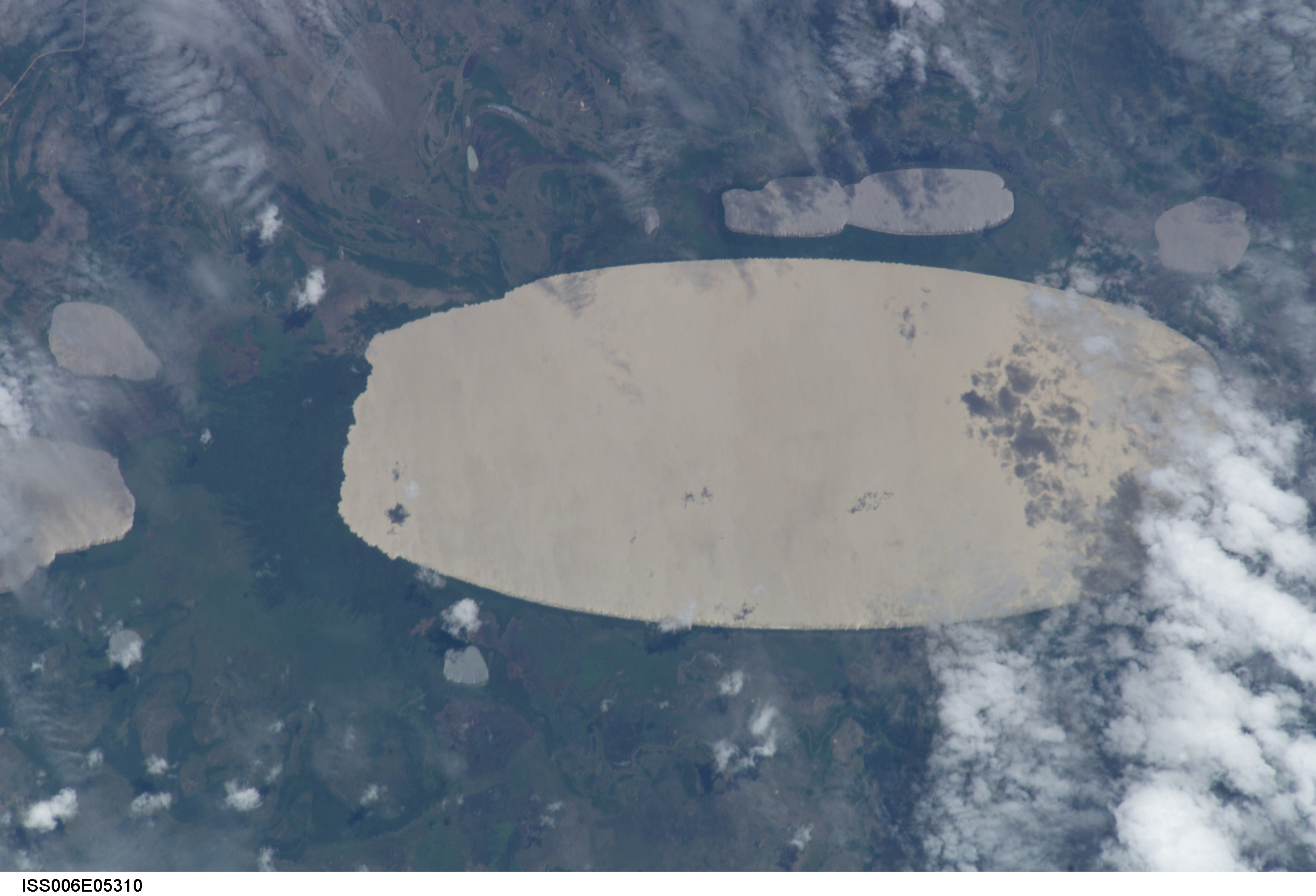
View of Rogagua Lake taken during ISS Expedition 6.

Rogagua Lake is a lake in the pampas area in the northern Bolivia, in the José Ballivián Province of the Beni Department.

Laguna Rogagua and some smaller lakes are north of Santa Rosa, Beni, Bolivia, and north east of Rurrenabaque and Reyes, Bolivia. Some of the popular pampas tours from Rurrenabaque go to the area of Laguna Rogagua or to the area of the Yacuma River.

Partial and shortened translation from the Spanish Wikipedia:

Rogagua Lake is a tropical Bolivian fresh water lake, located in the Amazonian river basin of the Beni Department. The Lake is 21 km in length by 9 km and has an area of 155 km² and perimeter of 52 kilometers, and is thus one of greatest lakes of Bolivia. Rogagua is an important reservoir for fresh water and wild life.

See on map

== Rogaguado Lake ==
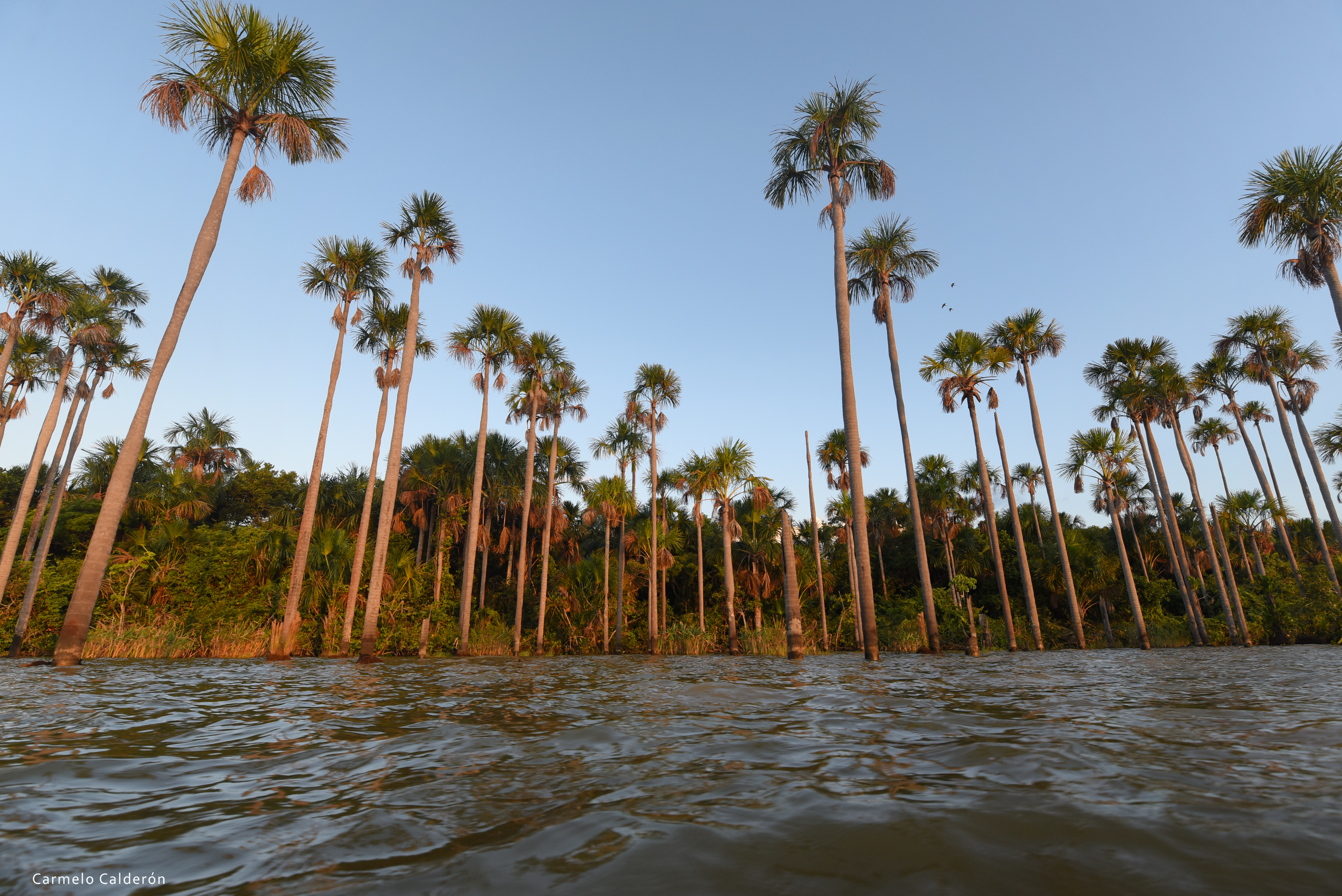
Rogaguado Lake

Rogaguado Lake is a tropical fresh water in the northern Bolivia, in the Yacuma Province of the Beni Department. It is close to the Rogagua Lake. The lake is 25,40 km long and 18,53 km wide, and it has an area of 315 km², making it one of the biggest lakes in Bolivia. It contains six islands, the biggest ones of 1 km² and the smaller ones of 0,65 km², located at the north side of the lake.

It was formed by an uplift event during the Holocene.

See on map

== San Antonio Lake ==
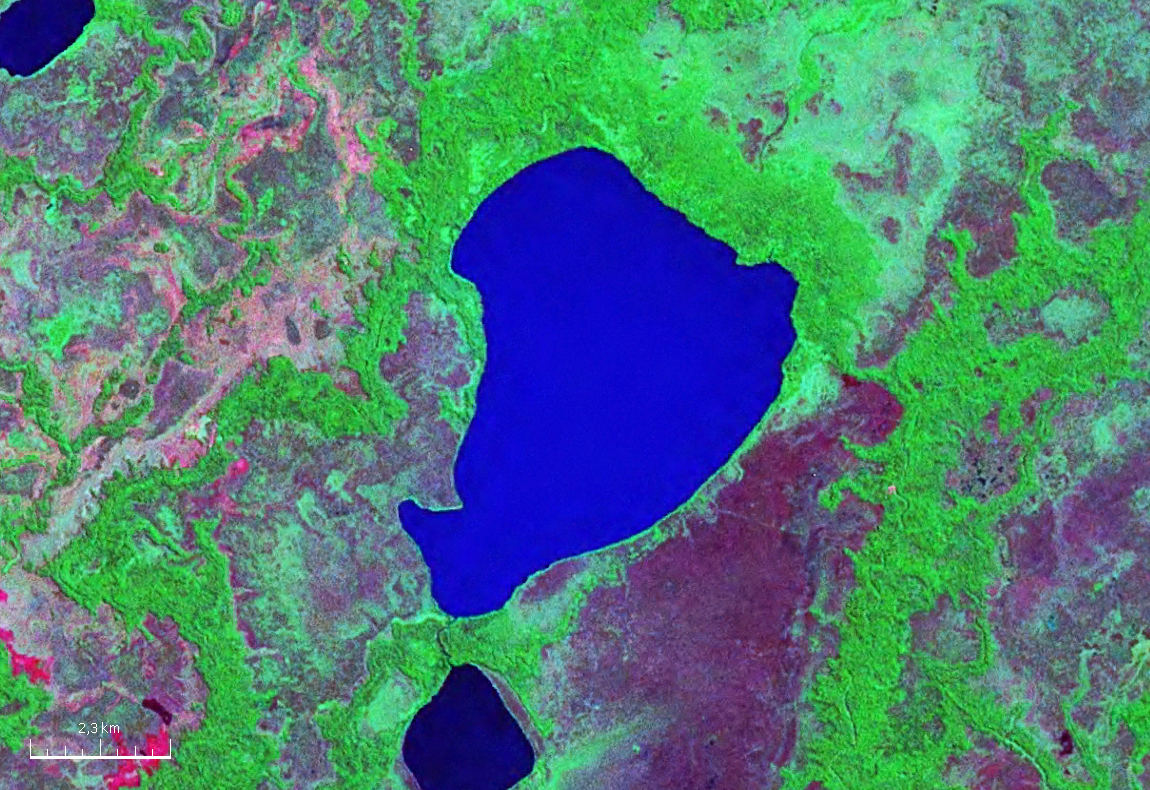
Laguna San Antonio

San Antonio Lake is a lake in the Beni Department, Bolivia. At an elevation of 205 m, its surface area is 26 km^{2}.

See on map

== San Francisco Lake ==
San Francisco Lake is a lake in the Beni Department, Bolivia. At an elevation of 138 m, its surface area is 12.7 km^{2}.

It is in the Madeira–Tapajós moist forests ecoregion.

See on map

== San Jorge Lake ==
San Jorge Lake is a lake in the Guarayos Province/Marbán Province, Beni Department, Bolivia. At an elevation of 160 m, its surface area is 68.6 km².

It is in the Southwest Amazon moist forests ecoregion.

See on map

== San José Lake ==
San José Lake is east of the city of Trinidad. The lake sits at an elevation of 202 m, its surface area is 14.7 km^{2}. It lies within the Aquicuana Reserve.

See on map

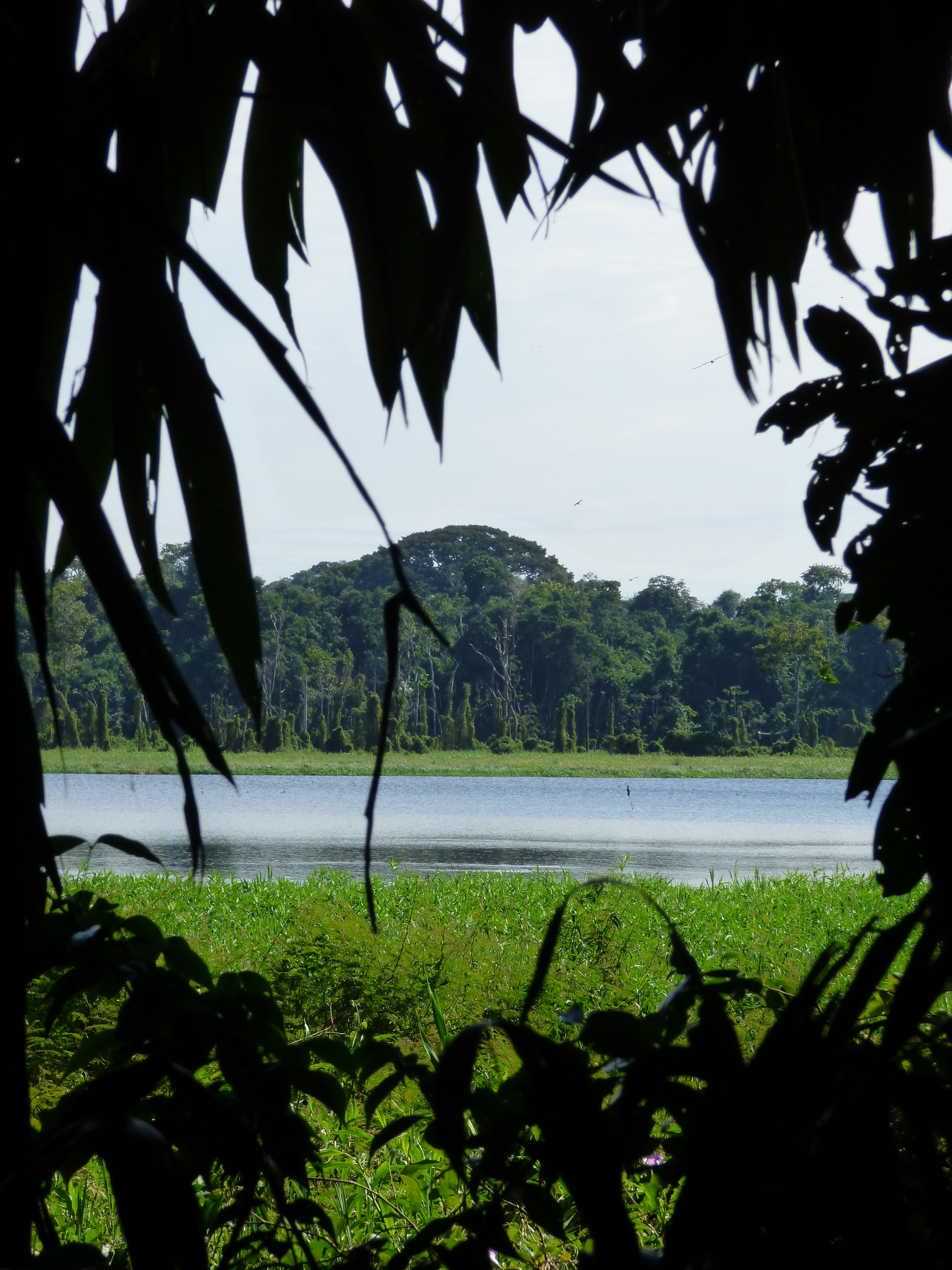
View of Lago San Jose through the jungle, Aquicuana Reserve, El Beni

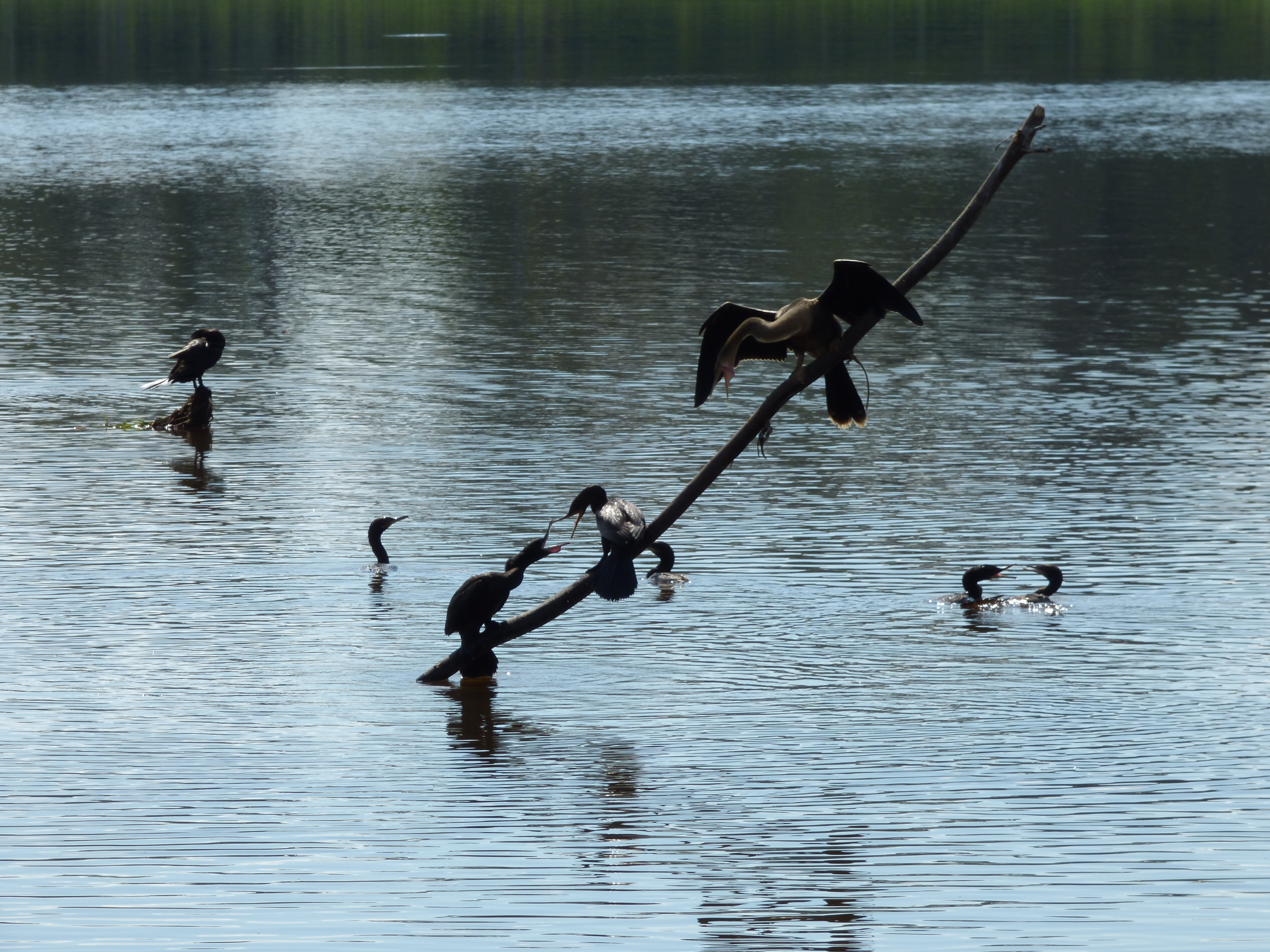
Fighting waterbirds at Lago San Jose, El Beni

== San Lorenzo Lake ==
San Lorenzo Lake is a lake in the Beni Department around central Bolivia. East of the city of Trinidad the lake sits at an elevation of 178 m, its surface area is 26.2 km².

See on map

== San Pedro Lake ==
San Pedro Lake is a lake in the Beni Department of Bolivia. It is in the southwest part of the Reserva Forestall Itenez at an elevation of 207 meters (679 ft). Its surface area is 21.9 km^{2} (8.5 sq mi).

It is in the Madeira–Tapajós moist forests ecoregion.

See on map

== San Roque Lake ==
Laguna San Roque is a lake in the Iténez Province, Beni Department, Bolivia. At an elevation of 190 m, its surface area is 4.5 km².

Its outflow is the Rio Cunano, a tributary of the Itonomas River.

See on map

== La Sarca Lake ==
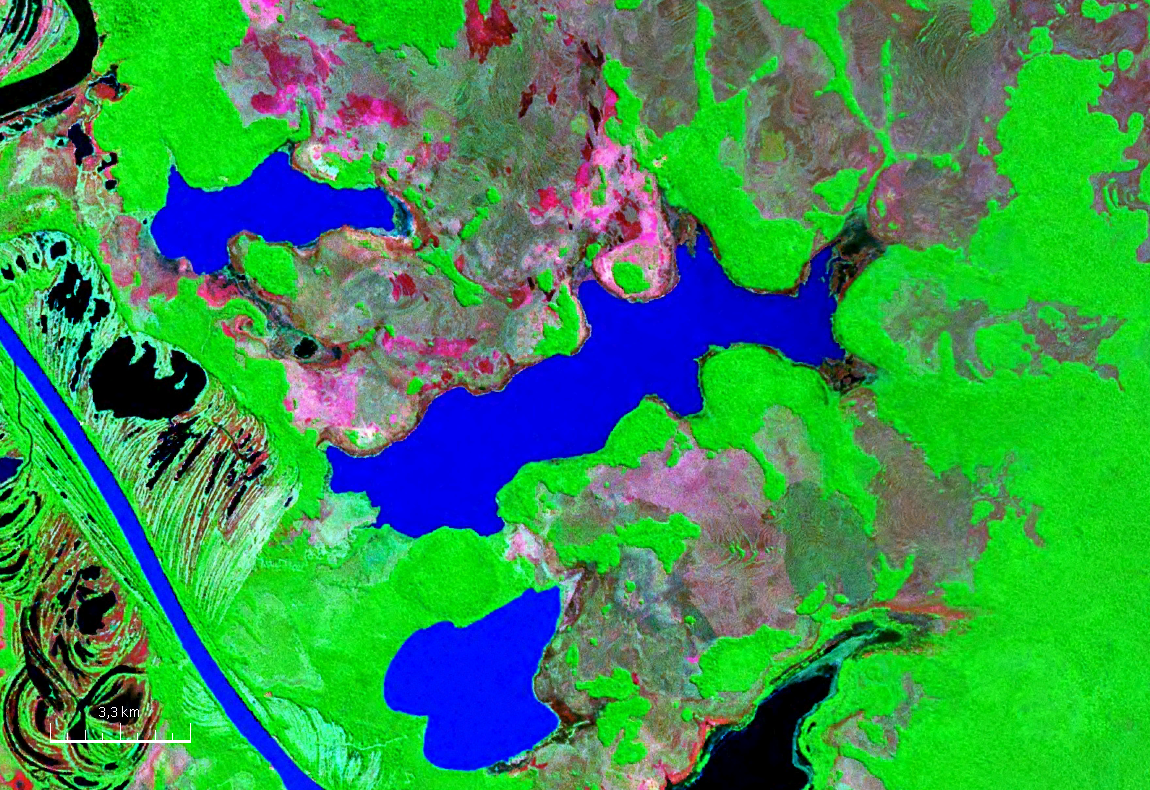
Laguna La Sarca

La Sarca Lake is a lake in the Beni Department, Bolivia. At an elevation of 136 m, its surface area is 26 km^{2}.

It is in the Southwest Amazon moist forests ecoregion.

See on map

== Suárez Lake ==
Suárez Lake is a lake in the Cercado Province, Beni Department, Bolivia. Its surface area is 6 km². It is southwest of Trinidad, Beni.

See on map

== Tacuaral Lake ==
Laguna Tacuaral is a lake in the Beni Department, Bolivia. At an elevation of 170 m, its surface area is 16.7 km^{2}.

It is in the Southwest Amazon moist forests ecoregion.

See on map

== Tanguina Lake ==
Laguna Tanquina is a lake in Beni Department. At an elevation of 176 m, its surface area is 14.8 km^{2}. It is within the area of Reserva Forestal Itenez, next to the northeastern border with Brazil.

It is in the Madeira–Tapajós moist forests ecoregion.

See on map

== Tapada Lake ==
Laguna Tapada also Laguna Las Canchas o Tapada or Laguna Las Conchas is a Bolivian Amazon freshwater lagoon located east of the Beni Department in the Marbán province, it is close to the Santa Cruz department.

Tapada lagoon is at an elevation of 206 meters above sea level. With maximum dimensions of 8 km long by 6 km wide in the rainy season and a surface area of 1,901.6 hectares or 19.01 km^{2}, it has an average rounded shape. Short distance to the north of it is Laguna Barrientos.

It lies outside the Llanos de Moxos, in the Chiquitano dry forests.

See on map

== Todos Santos Lake ==
Todos Santos Lake is a lake bordering Beni Department and Santa Cruz Department. At an elevation of 193 m, its surface area is 4.12 km^{2}.

It is in the Madeira–Tapajós moist forests ecoregion.

See on map

== El Triunfo Lake ==
El Triunfo Lake is a lake in the Beni Department, Bolivia.

The El Triunfo lagoon is a Bolivian Amazon freshwater lagoon located in the east part of the Beni department, near the Guaporé River and 4 kilometers south of the border with Brazil. It is in the Madeira–Tapajós moist forests ecoregion. The lagoon dimensions are 5.8 kilometers in length by 5.1 kilometers in width, resulting in a surface area of 19.3 km^{2} (7.5 sq mi). Its coastal perimeter is 17 kilometers.

It is characterized by having a round shape as well as being surrounded by a thick jungle.

See on map

== Tumichuqua Lake ==
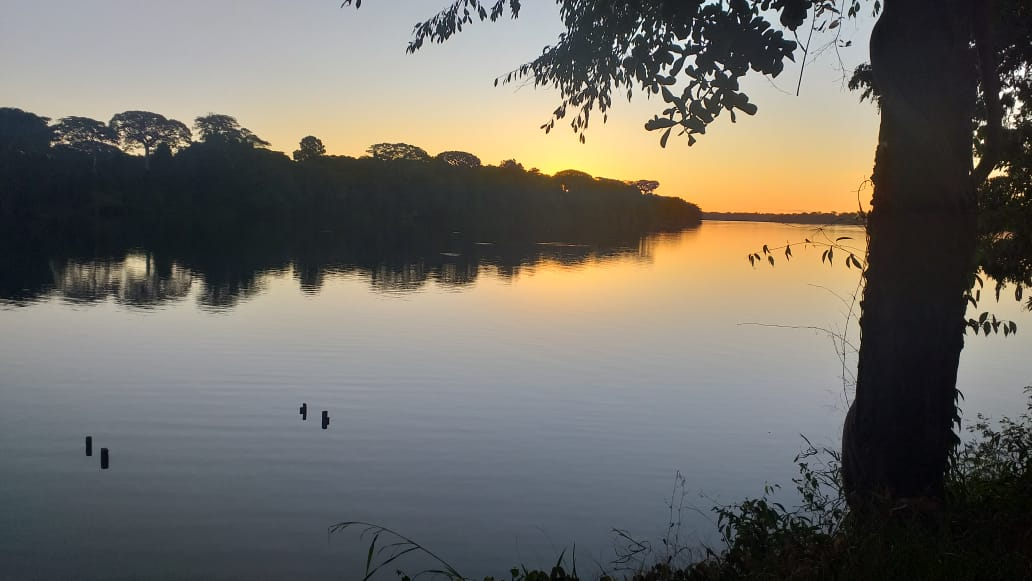
Laguna Tumichuqua

Laguna Tumichuqua and Beni River

Laguna Tumichuqua or Tumi Chucua Lake is an oxbow lake formed in a bend of the Beni River in the northwest of Beni Department. It lies in the Southwest Amazon moist forests ecoregion. Its surface area is 3.4 km^{2}.

Tumichuqua means "Island of Palm Trees" in the Tacana language. Tumichuqua Island lies in the center of the lake.

SIL operated a Instituto Lingüístico de Verano facility alongside the lake until 1982, when it transferred facility management to the Bolivian government.

Tumichucua is the site of significant earthworks and is a site of archeaological study.

See on map

== Laguna Verde ==
Laguna Verde is a lake in the Beni Department, Bolivia. At an elevation of 175 m, its surface area is 4.53 km².

See on map

== Laguna Victoria ==
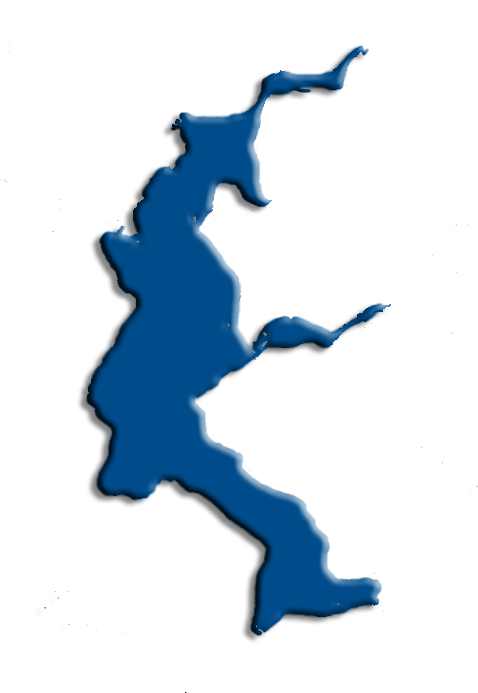
Laguna Victoria depth map

Laguna Victoria is a lake in the Beni Department, Bolivia. At an elevation of 201 m, its surface area is 25 km^{2}.

It is in the Madeira–Tapajós moist forests ecoregion.

See on map

== Yusala Lake ==
Lago Yusala is a lake in the Beni Department, Bolivia. At an elevation of 170 m, its surface area is 13.67 km^{2}.

See on map

== See also ==
- List of lakes in Bolivia
