= Marfil Lake =

Lake in Brazil and Bolivia

- Baía Grande
- Laguna de Marfil (Spanish)
- Location within Bolivia Location within Brazil Location within South America
- Interactive map of Marfil Lake
- Location: José Miguel de Velasco Province, Santa Cruz Department, Bolivia and Mato Grosso, Brazil
- Coordinates: 15°30′21″S 60°14′13″W
- Basin countries: Bolivia, Brazil
- Surface area: 97.5 km^{2} (37.6 sq mi)
- Surface elevation: 246 m (807 ft)

Laguna de Marfil or Baía Grande is a lake in Mato Grosso, Brazil and José Miguel de Velasco Province, Santa Cruz Department, Bolivia. Located at an elevation of 246 m, its surface area is 97.5 km^{2}.
