= La Gaiba Lake =

Lake in Bolivia and Brazil

- Laguna La Gayba
- Laguna La Gaiba (Portuguese)
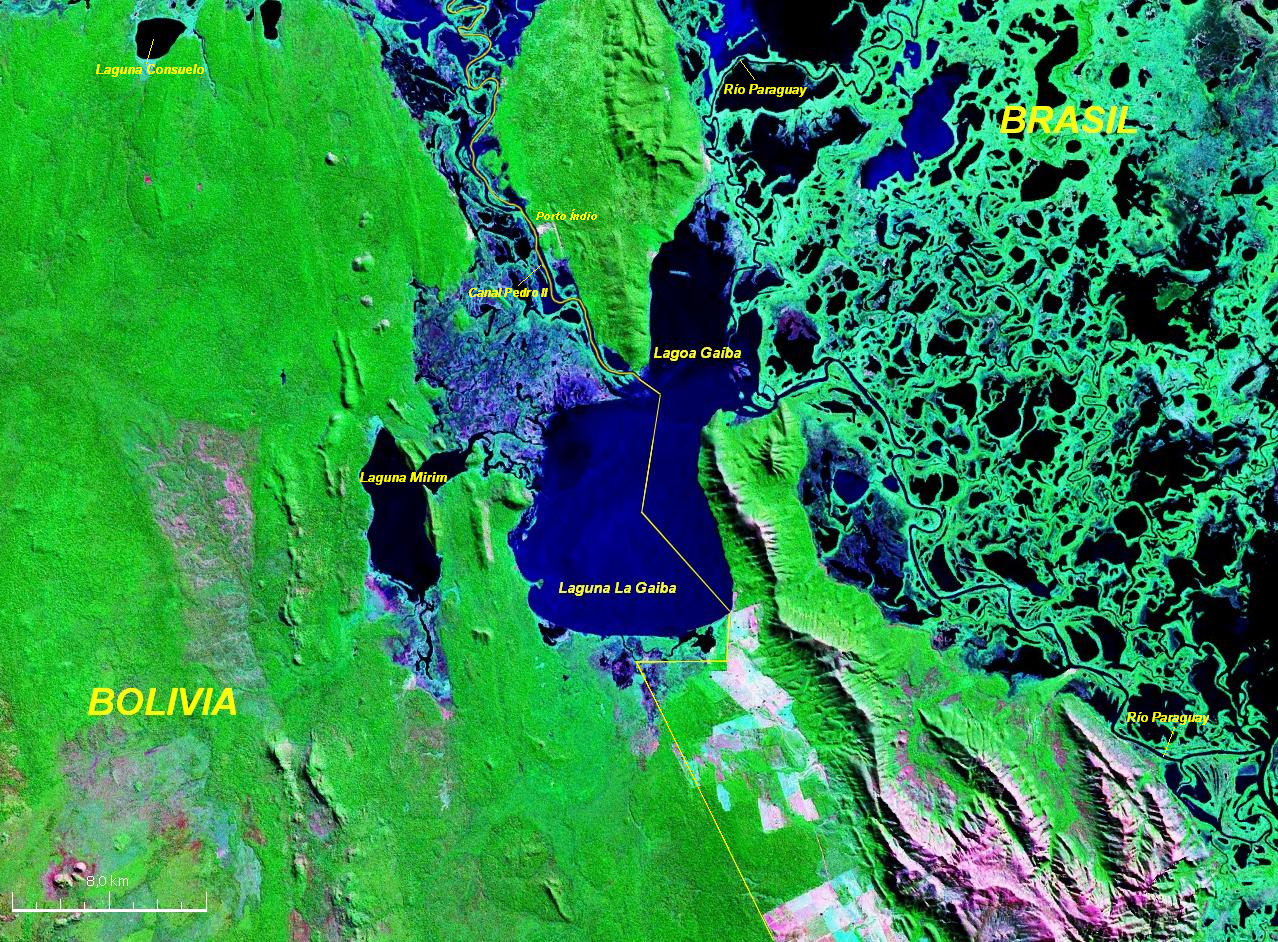

- Location within Bolivia Location within Brazil Location within South America
- Interactive map of La Gaiba Lake
- Location: Ángel Sandoval Province, Santa Cruz Department, Bolivia / Mato Grosso, Brazil
- Coordinates: 17°46′20″S 57°43′13″W
- Primary inflows: Río Paraguay
- Primary outflows: Río Paraguay
- Basin countries: Bolivia, Brazil
- Surface area: 98 km^{2} (38 sq mi)
- Surface elevation: 160 m (520 ft)

Laguna La Gaiba is a lake in the Ángel Sandoval Province, Bolivia and Mato Grosso, Brazil.
