= Cerro Panizos =

Late Miocene caldera in Bolivia and Argentina

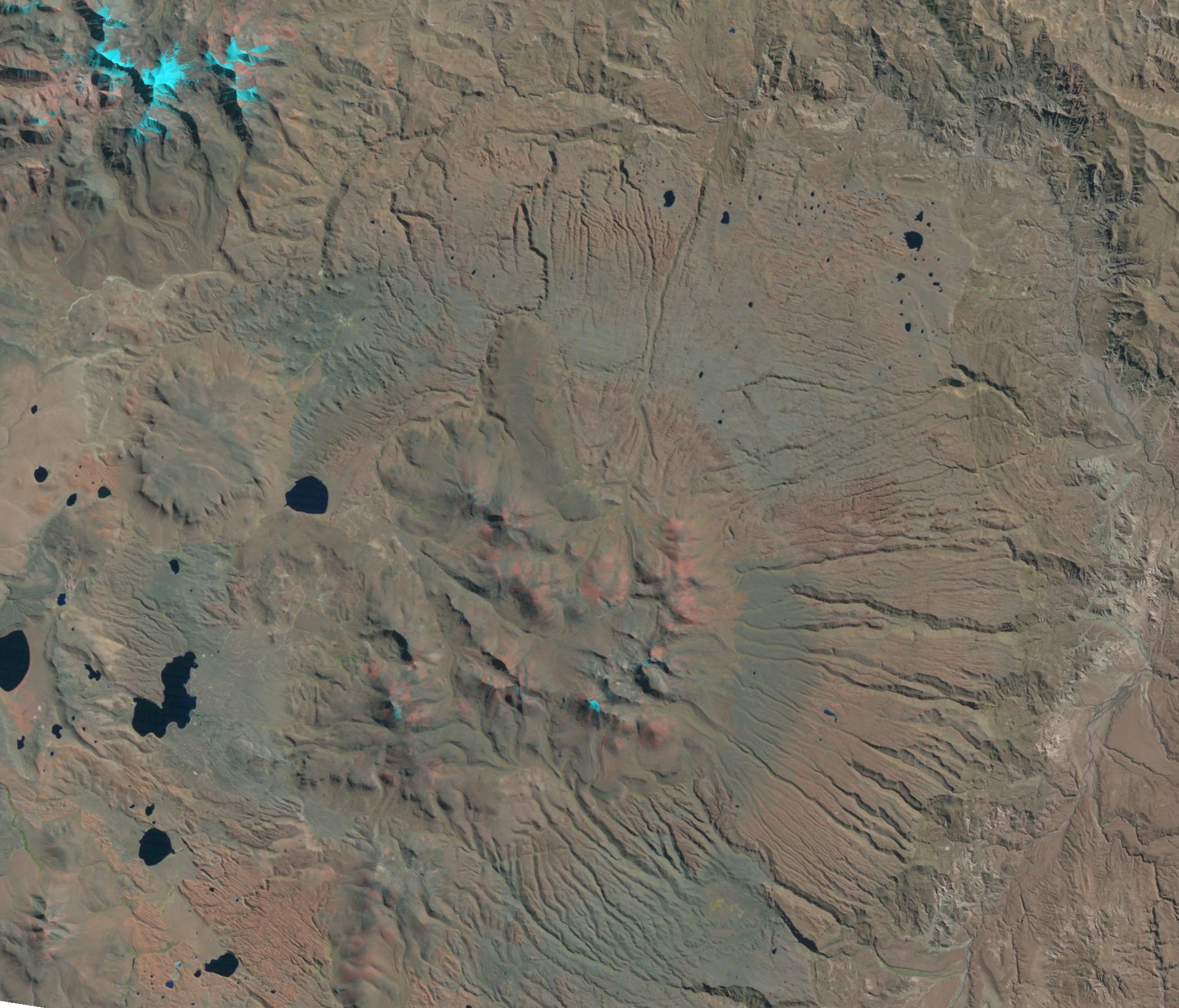
- The lava domes in the centre of the image form the Panizos centre. Image is about 50 km (31 mi) across.

Highest point
- Coordinates: 22°15′S 66°45′W

Geography
- Location within South America Location within Bolivia
- Parent range: Cordillera de Lípez

Geology
- Volcanic field: Altiplano-Puna volcanic complex
- Last eruption: 6.1 mya

Cerro Panizos (Spanish: [ˈse.ro paˈni.sos], "Maize Hill") is a late Miocene (Note: The Miocene is the geological period between 23.03 and 5.333 million years ago.)-age shield-shaped volcano spanning the Potosi Department of Bolivia and the Jujuy Province of Argentina. It features two calderas (depressions formed by the collapse of a volcano) and a group of lava domes. It is part of the Altiplano–Puna volcanic complex (APVC), a group of calderas and associated ignimbrites (a form of volcanic rock) that erupted during the past ten million years. Cerro Panizos is part of the Central Volcanic Zone (CVZ), a volcanic arc that extends from Peru to Chile that was formed mostly by subduction of the Nazca Plate beneath South America.

Volcanic activity commenced in the APVC about ten million years ago, producing the volcano Uturuncu and the large volcanic calderas Panizos, Vilama, and Cerro Guacha. The formation of the APVC has been linked to the existence of a giant magmatic body in the crust of the Central Andes.

The Cienago Ignimbrite erupted over 350 cubic kilometres (84 mi^{3}) from Panizos about 7.9 million years ago, and 6.7 million years ago the Panizos Ignimbrite erupted over 650 cubic kilometres (160 mi^{3}). The Panizos Ignimbrite has been noted for volcanic rocks containing orbs (Note: An orb is a rock formed by concentric layers of minerals, that is found embedded within volcanic rocks.). Several volcanic cones such as Limitayoc were active between the ignimbrite eruptions, and a plateau of lava flows and lava domes formed in the central area of the Panizos Ignimbrite after the last eruptions.

== Geography and geomorphology ==
Cerro Panizos lies in the Cordillera de Lipez mountain range of the Andean Altiplano-Puna high plateau. (Note: Sometimes the name is incorrectly applied to Laguna Colorada, which is a different volcano west of Panizos.) The volcano is a 40-kilometre-wide (25-mile), gently-sloping ignimbrite shield surrounding a 10–15-kilometre-wide (6.2–9.3-mile) lava dome semicircle. The mountain named "Cerro Panizos" (Note: A second 5,259 metres (17,254 ft) high mountain also named "Cerro Panizos" is located south of the volcanic complex, but is not part of it. It constitutes a different volcanic system, together with Cerro Salle and Cerro Alcoak.) is a c. 5,300-metre-high (17,400-foot) (Note: Exact estimates are 5,228-metre (17,152 ft), 5,360-metre (17,590 ft) or 5,494-metre (18,025 ft).) lava dome in the southeastern semicircle. The other domes are Cerro Cuevas, Cerro Crucesnioc, Cerro Vicunahuasi west, and the 5,540-metre-high (18,180-foot) Cerro La Ramada north of Cerro Panizos mountain. (Note: Crucesnioc is also known as Crucesnioj or El Volcán, and Cerro La Ramada as Cerro Ramada.)

Two calderas have been identified at Cerro Panizos. The larger one, which is centred south of the lava dome semicircle, may have been formed by downward sagging of the ground. Within this lies a smaller collapse caldera, outlined by the lava domes. Cerro Anta Cuevas, Cerro Chinchijaran, Cerro Limitayoc/Limitayo, and Cerro Tucunquis are lava plateaus that rise from the ignimbrite shield. The 5,158-metre-high (16,923-foot) Limitayoc formed along a north-south trending fault and has an elongated shape, with traces of hydrothermal alteration at its northern end.

Owing to the arid climate, little erosion has taken place. Parts of the ignimbrite are covered with windblown sand. Landforms have conical, dome-like, or table-like shapes. Erosion of the ignimbrite has formed cliffs and rows of pinnacles, the latter of which draw photographers owing to their exotic appearance. The ignimbrite shield of Panizos has been compared to paterae on Mars.

=== Hydrology and human geography and history ===
Several (often ephemeral) streams cut into the rocks of the shield to form a radial drainage system. The streams run mostly to the east; from north to south they are Rio Khuchu Mayu and the Quebradas Buenos Aires, Cienago, (Note: Could be identical with Quebrada Cienaga Grande) Paicone, Potrero, Guanapata, Pupusayo, Cusi Cusi, Cueva, Garcia, and Quenoal. (Note: Alternative names are Khuchumayu for Rio Khuchu Mayu, Pupusayoc for Pupusayo and Quebrada de Garcia for Quebrada Garcia.) Most of them eventually join the San Juan de Oro River, which flows into the Atlantic Ocean. Panizos can be accessed through the valleys of these streams. Small lakes dot the southwestern sector of the shield, and there are ephemeral lakes on its southeastern side. The mountain Cerro San Matias borders Panizos to the north, Cerro Lipez northwest, and Corutu southwest of Panizos, while the San Juan de Oro depression is east of the volcano.

The region is remote and inhospitable. Most of the volcano is in Bolivia's Potosi Department (Sud Lipez Province), except for the southeastern quadrant which lies in Argentina's Jujuy Province (Rinconada and Santa Catalina Departments). The border between Argentina and Bolivia runs along the domes. The towns of Cusi Cusi and San Antonio de Esmoruca (Note: Also known as San Antonio de Esmoruco.) are southeast and north of the volcano, respectively. There are several archeological sites on Panizos, and a branch of the Inca road system passed over the volcano. Most of the central domes were first climbed in November 1939, but the volcano itself was only identified as such in 1977, thanks to images from the Landsat satellite.

== Climate, flora and fauna ==
The region is a cold, dry desert, with annual precipitation reaching 200–400 millimetres (7.9–15.7 in) per year and only sparse cloud cover. The day-night temperature contrast is high, and most nights have frosts. The only vegetation consists of cushion plants, grasses, and shrubs. Wetter areas feature wetlands (such as bofedales), and there are salt flats. The native fauna includes guanacos, llamas, tarucas, and vicuñas, and smaller animals such as chinchillas, vizcachas, and several mice genera. Local carnivores include Andean mountain cats, cougars, culpeos, Pampas cats, and South American gray foxes; and Chilean, Andean, and James's flamingos, Andean geese, Darwin's rheas, and ducks are among the native birds.

== Geology ==
Off the western coast of South America, the Nazca and Antarctic Plates subduct underneath South America. The subduction is responsible for the volcanism of the Andean Volcanic Belt, which is subdivided into four volcanic segments. The Central Volcanic Zone (CVZ) is the part of the Belt that includes Cerro Panizo. The CVZ consists of two parts: a volcanic arc with stratovolcanoes reaching 6,000 metres (20,000 ft) elevation, (Note: Above sea level; they rise from a high terrain and thus the actual mountains are only about 1,600–1,700 metres (5,200–5,600 ft) high) including the highest volcano in the world, Ojos del Salado; and numerous large calderas in the main arc and farther east, which produced the largest volume of Neogene-Quaternary volcanic rocks in the Andes. About 44 volcanoes in the CVZ have been active in historical time, Lascar being the most active of them.

The largest assembly of volcanoes in the CVZ is the 70,000-square-kilometre (27,000 mi^{2}) Altiplano–Puna volcanic complex (APVC), a system of calderas and ignimbrites that were active in the Altiplano–Puna high plateau (Note: The Altiplano-Puna high plateau extends across southwestern Bolivia, northwestern Argentina and northeastern Chile, and is after Tibet the second-highest and second-largest high plateau on Earth. The Puna is the southern half and the Altiplano the northern. Both formed between 10 and 8 million years ago during the so-called "Quechua" phase of Andean uplift. There are numerous volcanoes in the Puna, especially along its western margin.) during the Miocene. With a volume exceeding 15,000 cubic kilometres (3,600 mi^{3}), it is one of the largest ignimbrite provinces on Earth. Cerro Panizos is one of several known calderas in the APVC, but other buried calderas may exist, and only a few of these volcanoes have been studied in detail. Within the crust under the APVC is the Altiplano-Puna Magma Body, a giant pile of rock-magma mush at 9–31-kilometre (5.6–19.3 mi) depth that extends under southern Bolivia, northeastern Chile, and northwestern Argentina. It has a volume of 500,000 cubic kilometres (120,000 mi^{3}). The southern Bolivian tin belt overlaps with the APVC, and Panizos is the easternmost APVC volcano.

The basement is formed by volcanic, sedimentary and crystalline rocks, which have ages ranging from Paleozoic (Acoite Formation) to Cenozoic (Peñas Coloradas (Note: Also known as Peña Colorada Formation.) and Tiomayo Formations). The San Juan de Oro erosion surface forms the surface on which later volcanic rocks were emplaced. Two older ignimbrites underlie the Panizos centre, one of which originated at Corutu. The crust is 70 kilometres (43 mi) thick and up to a billion years old, but it reached its present-day thickness only during the late Cenozoic (Note: The Cenozoic is the geological period encompassing the last 66 million years.). It is intersected by numerous lineaments, some formed during the uplift of the Andes and others are older structures that were reactivated. Most calderas of the CVZ lie on such lineaments; one northeast–southwest trending line may have influenced the formation of Panizos, Vilama, and Cerro Guacha, and smaller scale structures at Panizos may reflect north-south and east-southeast-west-northwest trending lineaments. There is evidence of faulting, both before and after the eruption of the Panizos Ignimbrite.

=== Geochronology ===
Volcanic activity in the region began during the Jurassic (Note: The Jurassic is the geological period between 201.3±0.2 and about 145 million years ago.) in the Cordillera de la Costa and has migrated eastward since then. During the late Miocene, subduction under the Puna became steeper, causing the mantle wedge to become thicker and part of the overlying crust to delaminate, increasing the production of melts. Volcanic activity shifted east into the Puna until the Pliocene, (Note: The Pliocene is the geological period between 5.333 and 2.58 million years ago.) after which it returned to the main arc where it persists to this day. Numerous ignimbrites were emplaced between 25 and 1 million years ago, with the bulk dating from the late Miocene to Pliocene. Volcanic activity was episodic, with several recognizable flare-ups during which volcanic activity increased about 10, 8, 6, and 4 million years ago. Each of these flare-ups is associated with multiple ignimbrites: The first with the Artola, San Antonio, Lower Rio San Pedro, Divisoco, Granada, Pairique, and Coyaguayma; the second with the Sifon and Vilama; the third with the Panizos, Coranzuli, Toconce, Pujsa, Guacha, Chuhuilla, Carcote, and Alota; and the fourth with the Atana-Toconao, Tara, and Puripicar Ignimbrites. Sometimes the first and the second stages are considered together. In Bolivia, about 8–5 million years ago Kari-Kari was active, 8.4–6.4 million years ago Morococala, 8–5 million years ago Los Frailes, and during the last one million years Nuevo Mundo.

Volcanism declined during the past 4 million years, yielding smaller ignimbrites such as the Patao, Talabre-Pampa Chamaca, Laguna Colorada, Puripica Chico, Purico, Tatio, Filo Delgado, and Tuyajto. The last eruptions took place 271,000 and 85,000 years ago at Uturuncu and the Cerro Chascon-Runtu Jarita complex, respectively. During the 21st century, ongoing uplift was discovered at Uturuncu.

=== Composition ===
The volcano has erupted dacite, which contains numerous crystals and has a homogeneous composition; andesites are subordinate. Together these rocks constitute a peraluminous and potassium-rich calc-alkaline suite. Phenocrysts include biotite and plagioclase, while apatite and zircon form accessory phases (Note: An accessory mineral is a mineral that is present in a rock, but does not contribute to defining that rock's identity in chemical terms.); orthopyroxene, quartz, and sanidine are less common and clinopyroxene, hercynite, hornblende, hypersthene, ilmenite, and magnetite are rare. Many of the rarer minerals are xenoliths derived from the crust. Gold and silver deposits are found on the volcano, and antimony, copper, and uranium have been found together at Paicone. Potential occurrences of arsenic, lead, manganese, nickel, and zinc have been determined.

The rocks derive from a magma chamber, where stored magmas crystallized and underwent some fractional crystallization without mixing completely. The magma chamber was fed by a combination of mantle-derived basalts and melts from the lower crust, which formed in a melt zone at the bottom of the crust that is percolated by ascending basalts.

Oval orbs formed by concentric layers of crystals around a core have been found at Panizos. They make up less than one percent of Panizos rocks and only occur in the ignimbrites east and southeast of the volcano. The core is typically formed by a non-volcanic rock fragment or a cluster of orthopyroxene crystals, while the millimetre-thick layers of crystals are biotite, bronzite, ilmenite, orthopyroxene, and plagioclase. Large (up to 2-centimetre (0.79-inch)) phenocrysts co-occur with orbs. The orbs probably formed when magma rapidly degassed during the eruption of the Panizos Ignimbrite, prompting the formation of crystals around "seeds" like xenoliths or orthopyroxene crystals that eventually formed the orbs. Only a few volcanoes in the world have such orbs, probably because they require special conditions to form.

== Eruption history ==
Panizos was active in the late Miocene, although early Miocene rocks north of Panizos and the 12.4-million-years-old Cusi Cusi ignimbrite may also be part of it. Panizos was active at the same time as Coranzulí and Vilama-Coruto. It is the source of two major ignimbrites: the first (Cienago or Panizos I) was erupted 7.9 million years ago and forms two flow units with a total volume exceeding 300 cubic kilometres (72 mi^{3}), each underlaid by pyroclastic fallout deposits several centimetres thick. This ignimbrite, which contains a high proportion of pumice, might be the first eruption of Panizos. Afterwards, lava domes erupted on the southern side of the volcano, including Cerro Limitayoc, where activity continued after the Panizos Ignimbrite.

The second ignimbrite, the more than 650-cubic-kilometre (160 mi^{3}) Panizos (or Panizos II) Ignimbrite erupted from the volcano 6.7 million years ago. It was emplaced as two flow units, which are separated by multiple base surge, pyroclastic flow and volcanic ash deposits that reach thicknesses of several metres. A 1-metre-thick (3-foot-3-inch) layer of lapilli underlies the ignimbrite. The Panizos Ignimbrite forms the shield around the central dome complex, reaching as far as the Rio Granada–San Juan de Oro valley east of the volcano. The ignimbrite has a maximum thickness of about a few hundred metres, mostly around the central dome complex and where it filled in the pre-existent topography, forming thick deposits within valleys. The ignimbrite was not very mobile.

The Panizos Ignimbrite consists of crystal-rich, partially-welded pumice deposits, with individual pumice fragments reaching sizes of 80 centimetres (31 in), and rare lithics. Some rocks have been altered by outgassing. Rocks in the lower flow unit contain fewer crystals and more vesicles than in the upper flow unit, and cover a much smaller area. The Panizos Ignimbrite represents one of several "super-eruptions" in the Central Andes; these are giant volcanic events that exceed the size of all known eruptions of the last 11,700 years. Ash layers possibly correlated to the Panizos Ignimbrite have been found in the Cordillera de la Costa.

Both units of the Panizos Ignimbrite were products of the same eruption. After an initial Plinian eruption produced an eruption column, a vent in the southeastern part of the dome complex produced the lower flow unit. Collapse of the first vent or the opening of a new one caused a break in the eruption; the layer between the units and the downsag caldera formed at this time. Activity continued from multiple vents, making the upper flow unit. The two units originated from different levels of the same magma chamber, with hotter magma yielding the upper flow unit. The upper flow unit ponded within the downsag caldera until the second caldera breached its margins, allowing ignimbrites to flow out on the eastern side.

The caldera was subsequently filled with dacitic lavas and is no longer a depression. The flows originated from ring vents in the caldera, and were later overlaid by the lava dome group. Collapses at the eastern end of the volcano exposed underlying country rocks, and hydrothermal activity took place in the central dome complex. The last volcanic activity was 6.1 million years ago, and there is no evidence of Holocene (Note: The Holocene is the geological period that began 11,700 years ago.) activity. Aeolian and fluvial deposits are found in outcrops.
