= Uturuncu =

Stratovolcano in Bolivia

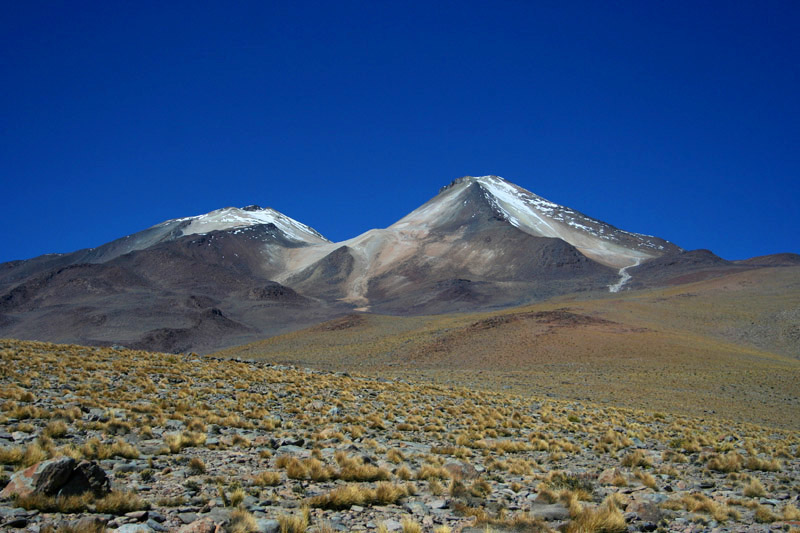
- Uturuncu seen from the northwest

Highest point
- Elevation: 6,008 metres (19,711 ft)
- Parent peak: Acamarachi
- Listing: List of mountains in Bolivia
- Coordinates: 22°16′12″S 67°10′48″W

Naming
- English translation: Jaguar
- Language of name: Quechua

Geography
- Location within Bolivia
- Location: San Pablo de Lípez Municipality, Sur Lípez Province, Potosí Department, Bolivia
- Parent range: Cordillera de Lípez

Geology
- Rock age: Pleistocene
- Mountain type: Stratovolcano
- Volcanic belt: Andean Volcanic Belt
- Volcanic field: Altiplano–Puna volcanic complex
- Last eruption: 250,000 years ago.

Climbing
- First ascent: 1955 by Friedrich Adolf Ernest Ahlfeld

Uturuncu is a dormant volcano in the Sur Lípez Province of Bolivia. It is 6,008 metres (19,711 ft) high, has two summit peaks, and consists of a complex of lava domes and lava flows with a total volume estimated to be 50–85 km^{3}. It bears traces of a former glaciation, even though it does not currently carry glaciers. Volcanic activity took place during the Pleistocene epoch and the last eruption was 250,000 years ago; since then Uturuncu has not erupted but active fumaroles occur in the summit region, between the two summits.

The volcano rises within the Altiplano–Puna volcanic complex, a larger province of large volcanoes and calderas which over the last few million years (mya) have emplaced about 10000 km^{3} of ignimbrites (Note: Ignimbrites are fluids consisting of gas and fragmented rocks that are expelled from volcanoes and form ignimbritic rocks when they solidify.) in sometimes very large eruptions. Underneath it lies the so-called Altiplano–Puna magmatic body, a large sill (Note: A sill is a sheet-shaped magma intrusion between layers of rock.) formed by partially molten rocks.

Starting in 1992, satellite observations have indicated a large area of regional uplift centered on Uturuncu, which has been interpreted as an indication of large-scale magma intrusion under the volcano. This might be a prelude to large-scale volcanic activity, including "supervolcanic" activity and caldera formation.

== Geography and geomorphology ==
Uturuncu lies in the San Pablo de Lípez municipality of the Sur Lípez area of southern Bolivia, southeast of the town of Quetena and just northeast of the Eduardo Avaroa Andean Fauna National Reserve in the Cordillera de Lípez. The region is almost uninhabited and the volcano was little known until ongoing large-scale ground deformation was discovered in the early 21st century; since then scientific interest and activity has increased, including a reconnaissance mission carried out by scientists in 2003, and numerous geophysical studies have been carried out on the volcano. The volcano has been used to reconstruct the regional history of glaciation. The term uturuncu means 'jaguar' in the Quechua language. The volcano is visible from afar. Today there might be mining activities in the area, and Uturuncu is a tourism target.

It was first ascended in 1955 by Friedrich Adolf Ernest Ahlfeld (Germany), but like other volcanoes in the Puna region, miners and native inhabitants may have ascended it earlier. A former sulfur mine named "Uturuncu" is situated on the mountain, close to the summit, and was considered to be one of the highest in the world. It reportedly contained reserves of 50 million tons of ore, consisting mainly of sulfur with some realgar which is dispersed among tephra (Note: Fragmented volcanic rocks erupted by the vent.) deposits and contains large amounts of arsenic. A winding road that served the sulfur mine leads up the mountain, and roads pass along the northern, eastern, and southwestern feet of Uturuncu.

=== Structure ===
At an elevation of 6,008 metres (19,711 ft), Uturuncu is the highest mountain in southwestern Bolivia. It dominates the regional geomorphology, rising about 1,510–1,670 metres (4,950–5,480 ft) above the surrounding terrain and presenting a good view of the surrounding mountains from the summit. The volcano has two summit peaks, one 5,930 metres (19,460 ft) and the other 6,008 metres (19,711 ft) high. They are about 1 kilometre (0.62 mi) apart and separated by a saddle that is 5,700 metres (18,700 ft) high. Uturuncu is a stratovolcano with remnants of a crater, and consists of lava domes and lava flows erupted from a number of vents in the central part of the volcano.

About 105 lava flows propagate outward from the central sector of the volcano, reaching lengths of 15 kilometres (9.3 mi) and featuring levees, flow ridges, and steep, blocky fronts over 10 metres (33 ft) thick. The northernmost lava flow is known as Lomo Escapa, and with a length of 9 kilometres (5.6 mi), it is also the largest lava flow at Uturuncu. Five lava domes south, west, and northwest of the summit form a northwest–southeast trending alignment that appears to be an older volcanic system; the southern of these domes have volumes of about 1 km^{3} and the western dome bears traces of a large collapse.

The broad edifice of the volcano covers an area of about 400 square kilometres (150 sq mi) and has a volume of 50–85 km^{3}. It appears to consist entirely of lava flows and lava domes; while the occurrence of pyroclastic flow deposits was reported at first, later research has not found any evidence of explosive eruptions. Aside from volcanic deposits there are also traces of glaciation that has smoothened the slopes of Uturuncu, as well as Pleistocene and Holocene alluvium (Note: Sediments deposited by water.) and colluvium. (Note: Sediments deposited by gravity.)

=== Lakes and rivers ===
Several lakes surround Uturuncu. Mama Khumu lies on the eastern foot of Uturuncu and is bordered by steep slopes; Laguna Celeste is located northeast of Uturuncu, Chojllas southeast of the volcano, and Loromayu to the south. The first two receive their inflow from Uturuncu. Beach terraces, deposits of diatomaceous earth, (Note: Sediments formed by the skeletons of diatoms.) and former shorelines are visible around the lakes. The Rio Grande de Lípez flows along the western foot of the volcano and receives tributaries which originate close to Uturuncu's northeastern foot; it eventually flows into the Salar de Uyuni. These watercourses are usually confined between steep bedrock walls and are characterized by gravelly beds, anastomosing channels, (Note: An anastomosing river has multiple channels through which water flows.) and wetlands that are used to keep llamas and sheep.

== Geology ==
=== Regional ===
The eastward subduction of the Nazca Plate beneath the South American Plate has generated three volcanic belts within the Andes, including the Central Volcanic Zone, which spans parts of Peru, Chile, Bolivia, and Argentina and includes Uturuncu. Aside from Uturuncu, it includes about 69 Holocene volcanoes in a high-elevation region, such as the potentially active volcanoes Irruputuncu, Olca-Paruma, Aucanquilcha, Ollagüe, Azufre, San Pedro, Putana, Sairecabur, Licancabur, Guayaques, Colachi, and Acamarachi.

=== Local ===
Uturuncu has formed about 100 kilometres (62 mi) east of the main volcanic front in the Western Cordillera, in a terrain formed by various volcanic and sedimentary rocks of Miocene-to-Quaternary age. The region is characterized by the Altiplano high plateau, which reaches an elevation of 4,000 metres (13,000 ft) and is only exceeded by Tibet in dimension.

The Vilama (8.41 million years old) and Guacha (5.65 Ma) ignimbrites underlie the volcano and crop out in the Quetena River valley. The Vilama lavas (4 Ma old) are found southwest of Uturuncu and are partly buried by the volcano. The crust in the region is about 65 kilometres (40 mi) thick.

Volcanic activity in the area occurred between 15 and 10 Ma. Cerro San Antonio, a Miocene volcano with a westward-opening collapse scar, lies just north of Uturuncu. It is heavily eroded and 3 Ma. Other volcanoes, from east counterclockwise to west, are the Cerro Panizos caldera, Cerro Lípez, Suni K'ira, and Quetena volcanoes as well as many more minor volcanic centres. Many of them formed along northwest–southeast trending lineaments such as the Lipez-Coranzuli and Pastos Grandes-Cojina lineament that passes through Uturuncu.

=== Geologic history and Altiplano–Puna volcanic complex ===
The geological history of the region is complex. After subduction commenced in the Jurassic, the breakup of the Farallon Plate into the Cocos Plate and the Nazca Plate 26 million years ago was accompanied by an increased subduction rate and the onset of the Andean Orogeny. This subduction process at first involved a relatively flat descent of the Nazca Plate until 12 Ma, after which it steepened. The Altiplano–Puna volcanic complex formed beginning 10 Ma, with a volcanic flare-up occurring during the Miocene.

The complex covers an area of 50,000–70,000 square kilometres (19,000–27,000 sq mi) of the Altiplano-Puna in Argentina, Bolivia, and Chile and consists of a number of calderas, composite volcanoesm and about 10000 km^{3} of ignimbrite. Uturuncu lies at its centre, but unlike it, most surrounding volcanic systems have been characterized by explosive eruptions, including several so-called "supereruptions" with Volcanic Explosivity Indices of 8 at Cerro Guacha, La Pacana, Pastos Grandes, and Vilama. Over 50 volcanoes in the region are potentially active.

Within the last two million years, the Laguna Colorada, Tatio, and Puripica Chico ignimbrites were erupted in the surrounding terrain. The Atana (4 Ma) and Pastos Grandes (3 Ma) ignimbrites are other large ignimbrites in the area while the San Antonio ignimbrite (10.33 ± 0.64 Ma) is more sparse.

The Altiplano–Puna volcanic complex is underpinned at about 20 kilometres (12 mi) depth by a wide magmatic sill where rocks are partially molten, the Altiplano–Puna magmatic body. Its existence has been established with various techniques; it extends over an area of 50,000 square kilometres (19,000 sq mi) and has a volume of about 500000 km^{3} with a thickness variously estimated at 1–20 kilometres (0.62–12.43 mi); about 20-30% of its volume is melt. It has been referred to as the largest reservoir of magma in the continental crust, or the largest silicic magma body, on Earth. The Altiplano–Puna magmatic body is the source of magmas for many of the volcanoes in the Altiplano–Puna volcanic complex. Its magma is extremely water-rich, consisting of about 10% water by weight; in addition, about 500000 km^{3} of brine (Note: A liquid with a very high salt content.) are contained in the rocks underneath Uturuncu.

=== Composition and magma genesis ===
Uturuncu has erupted dacite (as well as andesite in the form of inclusions within the dacite). Rocks are vesicular or porphyritic (Note: Rocks containing numerous crystals embedded in more fine-grained rock.) and contain phenocrysts (Note: Large crystals embedded into volcanic rocks.) of biotite, clinopyroxene, hornblende, ilmenite, magnetite, orthopyroxene, plagioclase, and quartz, along with apatite, monazite, and zircon within a rhyolite groundmass, (Note: Fine-grained rock that surrounds phenocrysts.) and define a potassium-rich calc-alkaline suite. Xenoliths (Note: Rock fragments entrained in ascending magma from surrounding rocks.) consisting of gneiss, igneous rocks, and norites have also been found; the first two appear to be derived from country rocks while the third (possibly also the first) is a by-product of the magma generation process. Additionally, the occurrence of cumulates, gabbros, hornfels, limestones, and sandstones as xenolithic phases has been reported.

Mixing processes involving hotter or more mafic magmas played a role in the genesis of Uturuncu rocks, as did fractional crystallization (Note: Changes in magma composition caused by crystals settling out under their weight.) processes and contamination with crustal rocks. The origin of these magmas appears to relate to the Altiplano–Puna magmatic body, which generates melts through differentiation of basaltic magmas first to andesites and then to dacites before being transferred to the shallow crust below Uturuncu from where it was then erupted through buoyancy-dependent processes. Magma composition has been stable over the history of the volcano.

== Glaciation ==
Modern Uturuncu features no glaciers; however, perennial ice was reported in 1956, remnants of snow in 1971, and the existence of sporadic snow fields in 1994. The summit area is occasionally ice-covered. Evidence of past glaciation such as glacial striations, glacially eroded valleys, both recessional and terminal moraines and roches moutonnées (Note: Rock formations that are smooth on one side and rough on the other, which form when glaciers moving over the formation erode the flat side but do not smooth the other side.) can be found on the northern, eastern, and southern flanks of Uturuncu. The past glaciation of Uturuncu was not extensive, owing to its steep flanks. One valley on Uturuncu's southwestern flank has been subject to glaciology studies, which identified a former glacier originating both from the summit and from an area about 0.5 kilometres (0.31 mi) south of the summit.

This only weakly erosive glacier deposited five sets of moraines up to 5 metres (16 ft) high within the shallow valley; the lowest of these lies at 4,800–4,850 metres (15,750–15,910 ft) elevation and appears to be a product of an early Last Glacial Maximum between 65,000 and 37,000 years ago, earlier than the global last glacial maximum. Afterwards, not much retreat occurred until 18,000 years ago. During the Pleistocene, the snow line was about 0.7–1.5 kilometres (0.43–0.93 mi) lower than today.

Conversely, the uppermost of these moraines is about 16,000–14,000 years old and correlates to a glacial advance in the Altiplano that has been linked to the maximum growth of the former Lake Tauca north of Uturuncu and a wet and cold climate associated with Heinrich event 1. At this same time 17,000–13,000 years ago, shorelines formed around the lakes that surround Uturuncu; Lake Tauca may have been a source of moisture for Uturuncu. After 14,000 years ago, the glacier receded at the same time as climate warmed during the Bølling–Allerød warming and the region became drier.

== Climate and vegetation ==
There is little information on local climatology, but mean annual precipitation is about 100–200 millimetres per year (3.9–7.9 in/year) or even less than that, most of it originating in the Amazon basin to the east and falling during December, January, and February. This low amount of precipitation is not adequate to sustain glaciers even though the summit of Uturuncu lies above the freezing level, but it is enough to generate a seasonal snowcap on the mountain. Annual temperatures in the region range between 0 and 5 °C (32 and 41 °F), and in 1963, the snowline was reported to exceed 5,900 metres (19,400 ft) elevation.

The regional vegetation is relatively sparse at high elevations. Polylepis trees are found on the lower slopes of the volcano; the trees reach 4 metres (13 ft) in height and form forests. They have been used as a source of tree-ring climate records.

== Eruption history ==
Uturuncu was active during the Pleistocene. A lower unit emplaced during the lower and middle Pleistocene (890,000–549,000 years ago) makes up most of the peripheral sectors of the volcano, while an upper unit of middle-to-upper Pleistocene age (427,000–271,000 years ago) forms its central sector and is less extensive. Several rocks have been dated through argon-argon dating and have yielded ages ranging from 1,050,000 ± 5,000 to 250,000 ± 5,000 years ago. Dates of 271,000 ± 26,000 years ago have been obtained from the summit area, 250,000 ± 5,000 for the youngest dated lava flow found just south-southeast of the summit, and 544,000 years for the Lomo Escapa lava flow, while the aligned lava domes have been dated to be between 549,000 ± 3,000 and 1,041,000 ± 12,000 years old. Overall, Uturuncu was active for about 800,000 years.

Volcanic eruptions at Uturuncu were effusive and involved the emission of voluminous lava flows (0.1–10 km^{3}) between pauses lasting from 50,000 to 180,000 years. The mean eruption rate was less than 60,000–270,000 cubic metres per year (2,100,000–9,500,000 ft^{3}/a), much less than other rhyolitic volcanoes. There is no evidence of large ignimbrite eruptions nor of large flank collapses but some lavas may have interacted with water or ice as they were erupted and were reportedly emplaced over moraines.

=== Holocene and fumarolic activity ===
No large effusive eruptions have occurred since the 250,000 ± 5,000 eruption, and Holocene or recent eruptions have not been reported. At first, it was proposed that postglacial lavas existed, but glaciation has affected the youngest lava flows. The volcano is considered to be dormant.

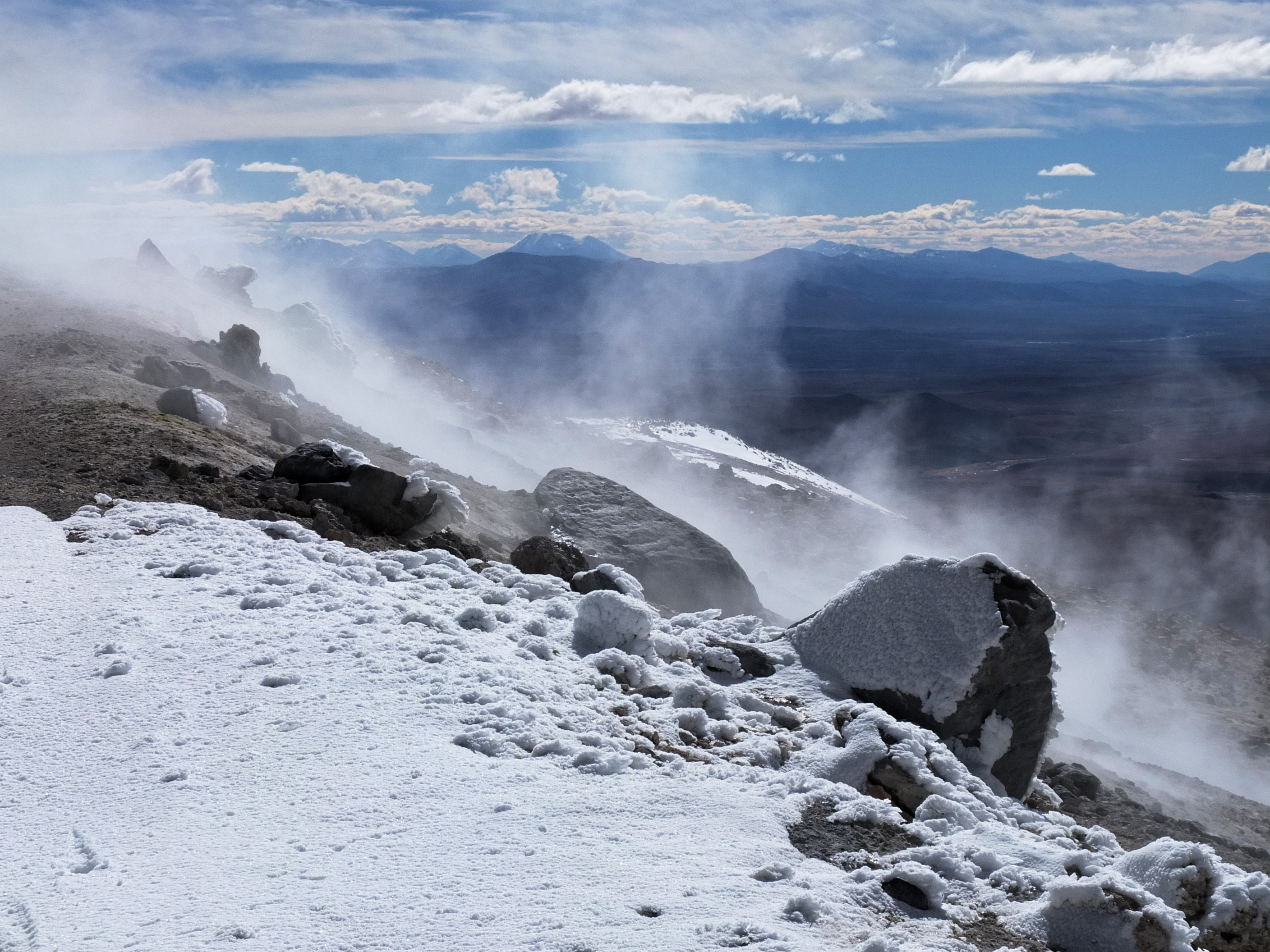
Fumaroles on Uturuncu

Active fumaroles occur in two fields below the summit, with a number of tiny vents located between the two summit peaks; vapour emissions are visible from close distance. The summit fumaroles have temperatures of less than 80 °C (176 °F). Their gases contain large quantities of carbon dioxide, water, and larger amounts of hydrogen sulfide than sulfur dioxide perhaps due to the latter being filtered out by a hydrothermal system. The fumaroles have emplaced abundant sulfur, and silification (Note: Silification is the replacement of rock by silicon dioxide.) has been observed. Relatively invariant temperature anomalies (hot spots) have been recorded by satellites on Uturuncu between its two summit peaks; these temperature anomalies of about 15 °C (27 °F) are among the largest fumarole fields visible to satellites. The existence of intense fumarolic activity on the northwestern slope at 5,500 metres (18,000 ft) was already reported in 1956.

A spring on the northwestern flank produces water with temperatures of 20 °C (68 °F) and may be identical to the Campamento Mina Uturuncu spring which in 1983 was reported to produce 21 °C (70 °F) warm water at a rate of 5–7 litres per second (0.18–0.25 cu ft/s). The presence of a weak hydrothermal system is likely at Uturuncu although probably at great depth, considering the low temperature and spread-out nature of the fumarolic activity. Magmatic fluids and gases may ascend in a vertical conductor into the volcano, with gas accumulating under the summit as the fluids spread out sideward. There may be a shallow magma chamber below the volcano at 1–3 kilometres (0.62–1.86 mi) below sea level.

== Recent unrest and threats ==
Interferometric synthetic-aperture radar imaging has discovered that a region of about 1,000 square kilometres (390 sq mi) around Uturuncu is uplifting. The uplift may have begun around 1965 but was first detected in 1992. Between 1992 and 2006, the uplift amounted to 1–2 centimetres per year (0.39–0.79 in/year) in an area 70 kilometres (43 mi) wide, with seasonal variations. There are longer-term changes in the uplift rate, such as a temporary acceleration after a 1998 earthquake, a gradual slowdown either continuing after 2017 or followed by an acceleration to about 9 millimetres per year (0.35 in/year) in the few years before 2017, or constant deformation between 2010 and 2018. As of 2023, uplift was still underway although activity might have declined over time. The overall volume change between 1992 and 2006 was about 1 cubic metre per second (35 cu ft/s), with a total volume change of about 0.4 km^{3}; such rates are typical for intrusions in the Altiplano–Puna volcanic complex and historical lava dome eruptions and might reflect a short-term rate.

The deformation is centered on an area 5 kilometres (3.1 mi) west of the summit and is most likely of magmatic origin given the lack of a large hydrothermal system at the volcano and the depth of the deformation. The form of the deforming structure is not well known but it lies presumably at a depth of 15–20 kilometres (9.3–12.4 mi) below sea level.

The uplifting area is surrounded by a ring-shaped area of subsidence (sinking), which is occurring at a rate of 2 millimetres per year (0.079 in/year); the total width of deforming terrain is about 170 kilometres (110 mi) although it is not clearly visible in all InSAR data. This joint uplift-subsidence has been called a "sombrero pattern" and the subsidence may reflect either a sideward or an upward migration of magma. A second, shallow subsidence area has been found south of Uturuncu, which may relate to changes in a hydrothermal system when brines drained out underground. This area may have begun subsiding in 2014. Deformation stopped in 2017.

The deformation is most likely caused by magma intruding into the crust from the Altiplano–Puna magmatic body, with the intrusion taking place at a level below that where magma accumulated prior to past eruptions of Uturuncu. The more recent changes may instead be a consequence of the upward movement of fluids, rather than magmatic processes. It has been described as an ascending diapir, (Note: A diapir is a rock formation, which owing to having a lower density than surrounding rock ascends through the latter.) a plate-shaped intrusion, or as a growing pluton, (Note: Intruded volcanic rock.) although an alternative theory holds the ascent of volatiles along a magma column reaching to the Altiplano–Puna magmatic body as responsible for the surface deformation; in that case the uplift might reverse over time.

Such surface uplift has been observed at other volcanic centres in the Central Volcanic Zone, but on a global scale it is unusual both for its long duration and its spatial extent, and in the case of Uturuncu demonstrates the continuing activity of the Altiplano–Puna magmatic body. There is no evidence for a net uplift in the geomorphology of the region, and findings in the terrain around Uturuncu indicate that this uplift certainly began less than 1,000 years ago and likely also less than 100 years ago. The uplift might be either a temporary deformation of the volcano that eventually deflates over time, or the current uplift might only be in its beginning stage. The term "zombie volcano" has been coined to describe volcanoes like Uturuncu that have been inactive for a long time but are actively deforming.

=== Seismicity ===
In addition, the volcano features persistent seismic activity with occasional bursts of higher activity; about three or four earthquakes occur every day at the volcano, and seismic swarms lasting minutes to hours with up to 60 earthquakes occur several times per month. The intensities of the earthquakes reach magnitude M_{L} 3.7. Most of this seismic activity occurs below the summit of Uturuncu around sea level, and some earthquakes appear to relate to the northwest–southeast tectonic trend of the region, although swarms occur in several areal clusters. Earthquakes are missing from the depth range of the Altiplano-Puna magmatic body but occur below it, implying that it is underlaid by brittle, cold crust. Whether there are long-term trends in seismic activity is difficult to estimate as the detection and reconnaissance techniques of seismic activity at Uturuncu have changed over time. This amount of seismic activity is large when compared to neighbouring volcanoes, and the seismic activity may be a consequence of the deformation, as intruding magma pressurizes and destabilizes local faults, as well as the ascent of fluids in faults and cracks. Further triggering processes are large earthquakes such as the 2010 Maule earthquake, which caused an intense seismic swarm in February 2010.

=== Tomographic studies ===
Magnetotelluric imaging of the volcano has found a number of high-conductivity anomalies below Uturuncu, including a wide, deep conductor that extends to the volcanic arc to the west and several shallower ones which ascend from the deep conductor that appears to coincide with the Altiplano–Puna magmatic body. The shallow conductors appear to relate to local volcanoes such as the Laguna Colorada vent but also Uturuncu; the latter conductor lies at 2–6 kilometres (1.2–3.7 mi) depth, is less than 10 kilometres (6.2 mi) wide, and may consist of molten rock with saline aqueous fluids.

Seismic tomography has found a tooth-shaped anomaly that begins at 2 kilometres (1.2 mi) depth and continues to over 80 kilometres (50 mi) of depth. Such structures have been found at other volcanoes and explained by the presence of magma. Seismic activity concentrates at the top of this anomaly. Finally, tectonic stress patterns delineate a 40–80-kilometre-wide (25–50 mi) ring surrounding the volcano that may be prone to fracturing; such a ring could constitute a future pathway for magma transport or the margin of a future caldera.

=== Threats ===
Whether the ongoing unrest at Uturuncu is part of a benign process of the growth of a pluton or the prelude of a new eruption or even a caldera-forming eruption is as of 2008 an open question. A large caldera-forming eruption could have catastrophic, globe-spanning consequences as demonstrated by the 1815 eruption of Mount Tambora in Indonesia and the 1600 eruption of Huaynaputina in Peru; this possibility has resulted in international attention from the media and popular culture; the volcano's threat is depicted in the 2016 film Salt and Fire. Evidence does not unequivocally indicate that a future super-eruption such as past events in the region is possible and there is no indication for a near-future eruption nor of the volcanic system being ready for activity, but there is potential for a smaller eruption.

== See also ==
- Geology of Bolivia
- List of volcanoes in Bolivia
- Mount Nelly
