= Nina Urqu =

Mountain in Bolivia

- Location within Bolivia

Highest point
- Elevation: 4,742 m (15,558 ft)
- Coordinates: 21°53′18″S 66°34′27″W

Geography
- Location: Bolivia, Potosí Department, Sud Lípez Province
- Parent range: Andes

Nina Urqu (Quechua nina fire, urqu mountain, "fire mountain", also spelled Nina Orkho) is a 4,742-metre-high (15,558 ft) mountain in the Andes of Bolivia. It is situated in the Potosí Department, Sud Lípez Province, in the north of the Esmoruco Municipality, south-west of Guadalupe. Nina Urqu lies south-east of the mountains P'aqu Urqu, Waqrayuq and Muruq'u.
