= Quetena =

Volcano in Bolivia

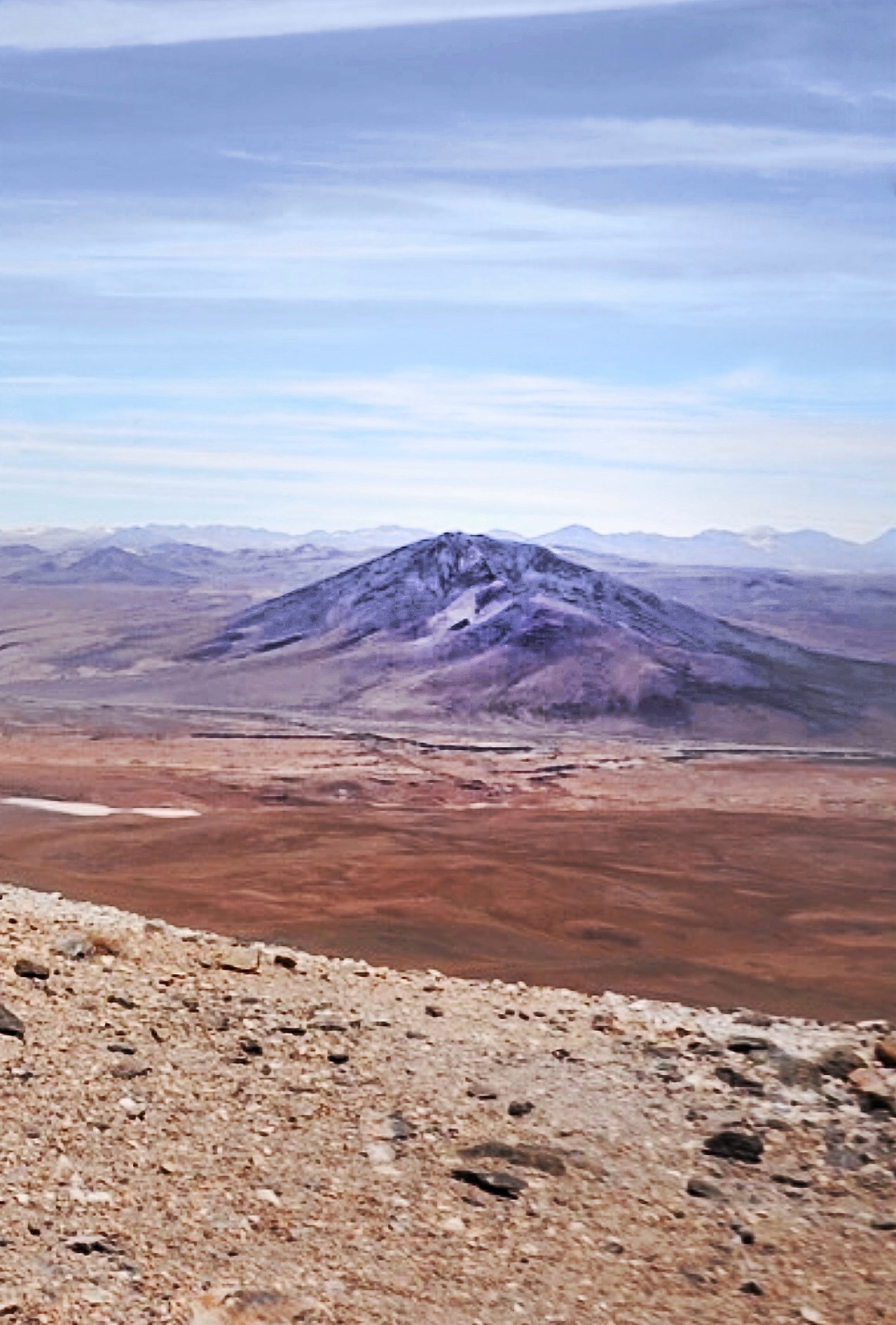
- Quetena seen from summit of Uturuncu

Highest point
- Elevation: 5,730 m (18,800 ft)
- Prominence: 998 m (3,274 ft)
- Coordinates: 22°15′39″S 67°24′56″W

Geography
- Location within Bolivia
- Location: San Pablo de Lípez Municipality, Sur Lípez Province, Potosí Department
- Country: Bolivia
- Department: Potosí Department
- Parent range: Cordillera de Lípez (Andes)

Quetena (Note: A separate, unrelated feature also named Cerro Quetena — a low hill (2,645 m) near Calama, Chile, associated with Permian–Triassic basement rocks — should not be confused with this volcano.) is a fissure-vent volcano in southwest Bolivia, located in the Sur Lípez Province of the Potosí Department, near the border with Chile. It rises to 5,730 metres (18,800 ft) above sea level with a topographic prominence of 998 metres (3,274 ft), and lies in the Cordillera de Lípez within the Central Volcanic Zone of the Andes. The Global Volcanism Program lists Quetena as the tallest fissure-vent volcano in the world.

The volcano lies within the Eduardo Avaroa Andean Fauna National Reserve, and the villages of Quetena Grande and Quetena Chico lie at its foot. Quetena is a comparatively easy high-altitude ascent typically approached from Quetena Chico. It is one of several minor volcanic centers northeast of Uturuncu, the region's largest stratovolcano.

A 1977 survey attributed fissure-fed lava flows at Quetena to the Holocene, but a later evaluation concluded that the volcano's activity likely occurred in the Pleistocene or earlier.

== Geography and geology ==
Quetena is part of the Central Volcanic Zone of the Andes, where volcanic activity is driven by the subduction of the Nazca Plate beneath the South America Plate. It lies in the Cordillera de Lípez, part of a region of southwestern Bolivia whose Cenozoic volcanic rocks have a combined estimated volume of about 8,000 km^{3}. Together with Cerro Panizos, Cerro Lípez, and Suni K'ira, it forms one of several minor volcanic centers northeast of Uturuncu, a much larger stratovolcano 23.5 kilometres (14.6 mi) to the east that is Quetena's nearest higher neighbor.

The Global Volcanism Program classifies Quetena as a fissure vent/cluster-type volcano and lists no confirmed Holocene eruptions. A 1977 structural and petrologic survey of the region reported lava effusions along fissures at Quetena as occurring in Holocene time, one of only a few post-Pleistocene volcanic events identified in the study area. A subsequent, unpublished assessment considered the volcanism at Quetena to instead be pre-Holocene, and possibly Pleistocene or older. Complicating this picture, a chemical analysis of a lava sample collected directly from the volcano was classified by the 1977 survey as part of a high-potassium calc-alkaline ("shoshonite") association, a group otherwise attributed in the same study to Miocene-to-Early Pleistocene volcanism in the region, suggesting that Quetena's volcanic activity may span more than one period rather than being exclusively Holocene.

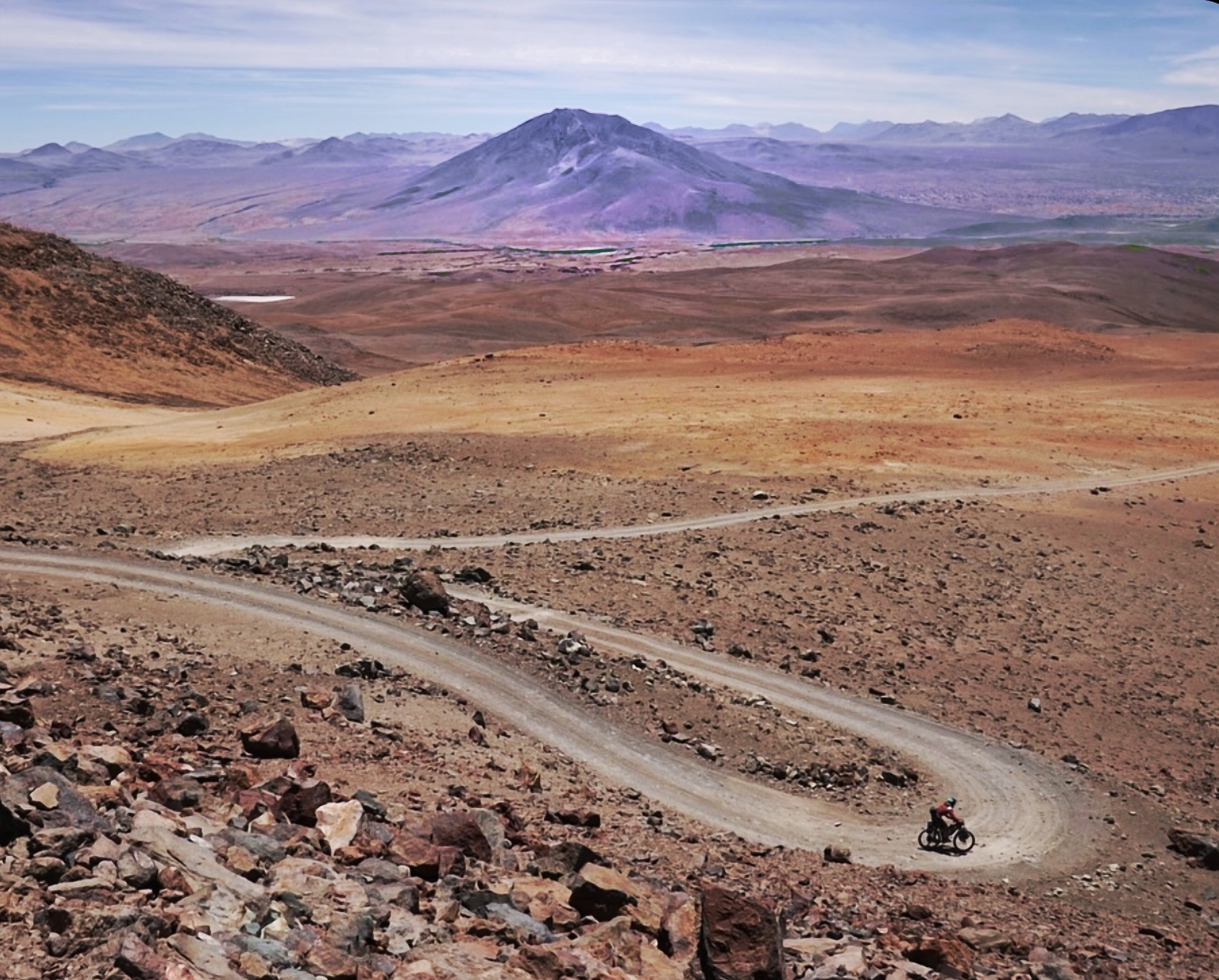
Biker descends from Uturuncu with Quetena in background

The Miocene-age Vilama and Pliocene-age Guacha ignimbrites underlie the surrounding area and crop out in the Quetena River valley. Lava flows found near Quetena beneath this ignimbrite plateau are considered contemporaneous with the Miocene-age Bonete Lavas exposed elsewhere in the region. South of Quetena, an ignimbrite sheet overlying Paleozoic basement rocks contains numerous fragments of Ordovician rock near its base, cited as evidence that the ignimbrite incorporated material eroded from the floor over which it flowed. Part of the ignimbrite sequence exposed in the central part of the Sur Lípez region has been attributed to eruptions from north–south-striking fissures located between Quetena and San Antonio de Lípez. The Quetena River drains the area around the volcano and is one of a set of tributaries of the Río Grande de Lípez that flow northward past Uturuncu into the Uyuni basin, the endorheic basin of the Salar de Uyuni.

The Paleozoic basement in the area is exposed in a series of horsts; one of these, striking north–south, is named the Quetena horst.

Quetena lies near the western edge of a satellite-detected tectonic uplift zone associated with the Altiplano-Puna Magma Body, and magnetotelluric surveys have found a shallow subsurface conductor and localized 3D electrical structure near the volcano.

== Human activity ==
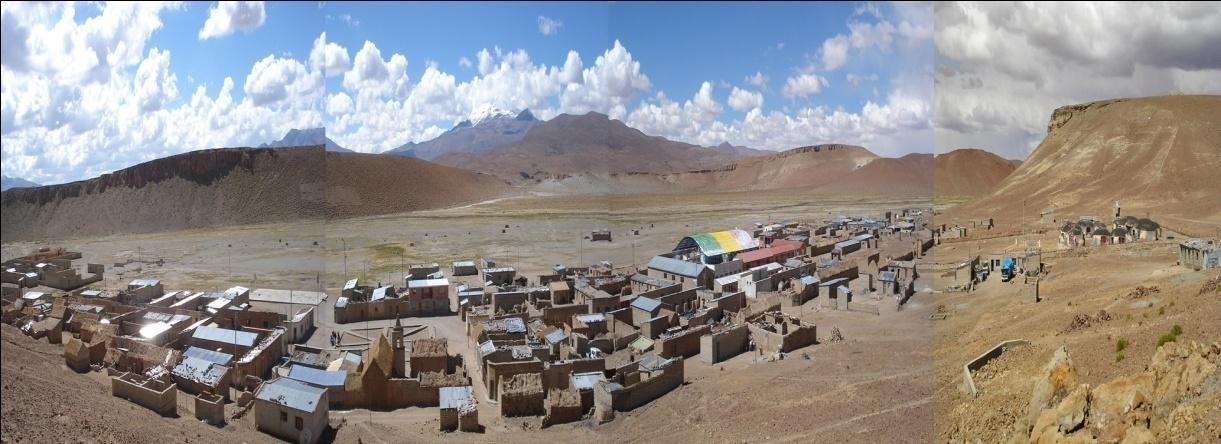
Peña Barrosa (Quetena Chico) at the foot of Quetena, with Uturuncu in the background

Quetena is described as a comparatively easy high-altitude ascent, typically approached from the village of Quetena Chico. The surrounding area lies within the Eduardo Avaroa Andean Fauna National Reserve, the most visited protected area in Bolivia, which receives over 50,000 visitors annually. Quetena Chico, at the foot of Quetena, serves as a base for ascents of the higher Uturuncu, reached by a former mining road.

An 1889 survey by astronomer Solon Irving Bailey from the Harvard College Observatory, conducted while scouting sites for the observatory's proposed Southern Hemisphere station, recorded Quetena's elevation as 5,720 metres (18,770 ft), within 10 meters of the volcano's modern GVP-listed height.

In 1985, scientists considered Quetena and other regions in Bolivia near the Chilean border, like Ollague and Laguna Colorada, as potential areas for a geothermal power plant.

== See also ==
- Uturuncu
- Sur Lípez Province
- Eduardo Avaroa Andean Fauna National Reserve
- List of volcanoes in Bolivia
