= Laguna Vilama =

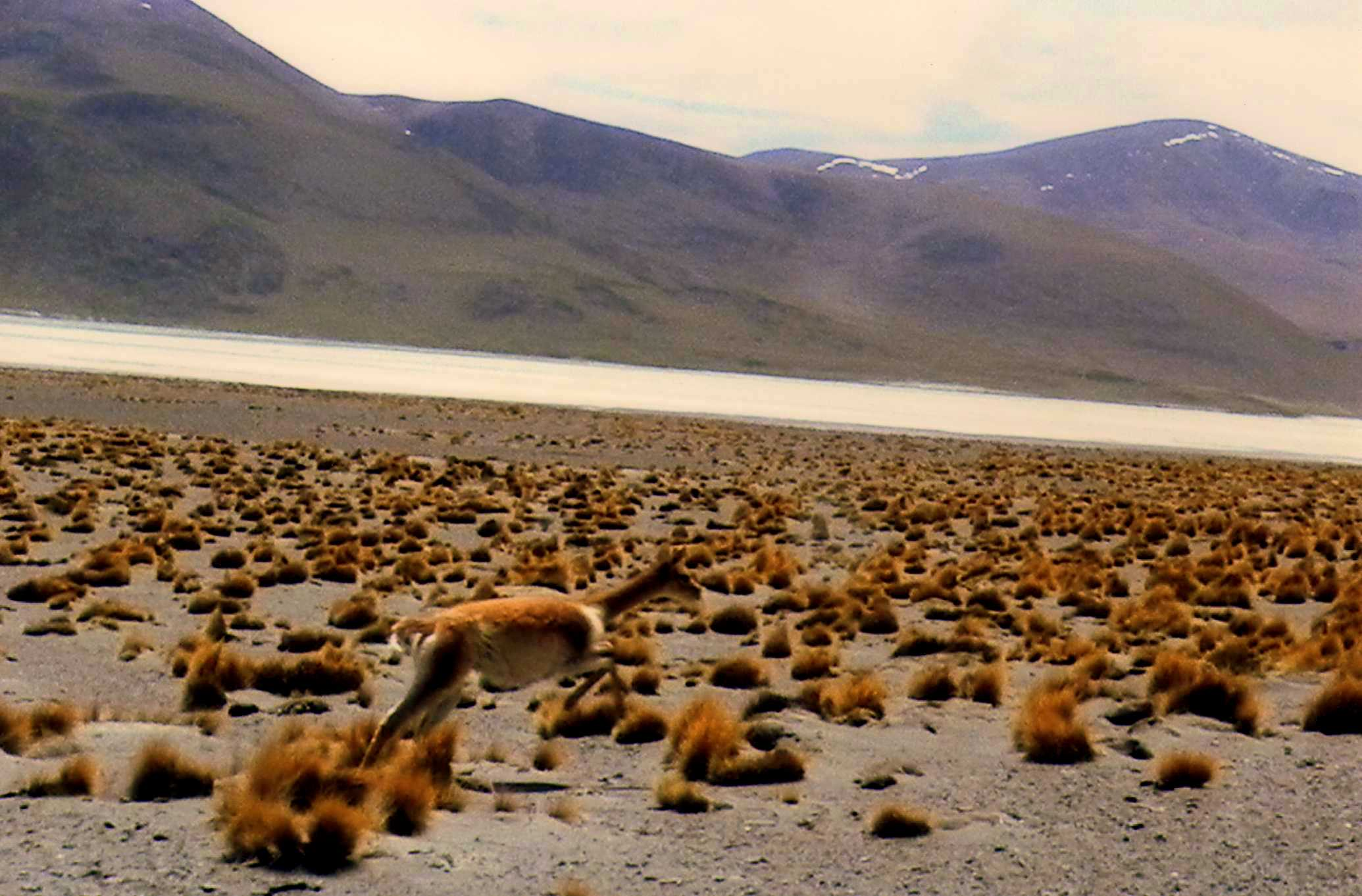

- Location in Argentina
- Location: Jujuy Province
- Coordinates: 22°35′S 66°55′W
- Type: Salt lake
- Basin countries: Argentina
- Surface area: 4,590 ha (11,300 acres)
- Average depth: 0.2 m (7.9 in)
- Surface elevation: 4,650 metres (15,260 ft)

Laguna Vilama is a salt lake in northwestern Argentina, within the Vilama caldera. It is shallow and covers a surface area of 4,590 hectares (11,300 acres).

== Lake ==
Laguna Vilama lies in the Jujuy Province of Argentina, close to the Sur Lípez Province of Bolivia and to the tripoint with Chile, Cerro Zapaleri. Mountains in the region include the Cerro Tinte, Zapaleri and other peaks of the Serranía de Dulcenombre. On the eastern shore of the lake lie abandoned tin mines; other resources of partly volcanic origin are basalt and gold and the salt ulexite which was obtained from the Pirquitas mine on the shore of Laguna Vilama.

This lake belongs to a group of remote Andean lakes that formed during the Tertiary. These lakes lie at elevations of 4,200–6,000 metres (13,800–19,700 ft) and are characterized by extreme environmental conditions, including high amounts of heavy metals such as arsenic, high salinity, high UV radiation, high daily temperature fluctuations and low availability of nutrients. The UV radiation is especially problematic for lifeforms inhabiting the lakes and acts as a mutagen, damaging cellular DNA. Lakes in the neighbourhood of Laguna Vilama include Laguna Coruto to the northwest across the border with Bolivia and Laguna Palar to the southeast, and there are more waterbodies east of Vilama.

Laguna Vilama lies at 4,650 metres (15,260 ft) elevation in the Puna of Argentina and has a surface area of 4,590 hectares (11,300 acres) and an average depth of 0.2 metres (7.9 in). It is one of the largest lakes in the Puna and developed within the southern moat of the Vilama caldera; the volcano draws its name from the lake. The waters of the lake are extremely clear and have a low chlorophyll content owing to a lack of nutrients. However, they are also rich in arsenic and extremely saline with sodium chloride being the predominant salt. A hot spring is found at its shores.

== Climate and environment ==
The climate of the region is dry with precipitation of less than 150 millimetres per year (5.9 in/year) and cold with mean temperature of 2 °C (36 °F); temperatures can reach 20 °C (68 °F) during the day and drop to −40 °C (−40 °F) during the night. Precipitation mostly originates from the South American Monsoon.

Laguna Vilama and some neighbouring lakes have been classified as Ramsar sites in 2000. The environment around these lakes is called "Desert Puna" or "Salt Puna" and is uninhabited owing to its dry climate. Vegetation includes ferns and grasses in part associated with wetlands such as Festuca, Oxychloe andina, Parastrephia and Werneria pygmaea as well as Polylepis and Yareta. At Laguna Vilama and other lakes birds like Andean geese, Darwin's rhea, ducks and flamingos can be observed, mammals in the region include chinchillas, vicuñas and vizcachas.

Microbial mats have been observed at Laguna Vilama. Diatoms can be found in the lake waters, and the diatom species Staurophora vilamae, the bacterial species Halomonas vilamensis and Halopeptonella vilamensis - now known as Spiribacter vilamensis - were first discovered in Laguna Vilama.

The environment around these lakes has remained stable over the last three millennia, but since the 1970s a trend towards a drier climate has been observed, accompanied by a shrinkage of the lake.

== Human use ==
Despite the dry climate, animals, minerals and wetlands have drawn humans to the region. The grasses and herbs are used by inhabitants of the towns of Cusi Cusi in Argentina and Quetena in Bolivia as pasture, birds are used for their eggs and feathers in e.g. religious ceremonies and larger mammals are hunted. In addition, mining took place.

Archeological sites are found, including chullpas, the site Chillagua Grande close to the southern margin of Laguna Vilama. There, enclosures and formerly roofed buildings were identified, which were later used as refuge for pastoralists and travellers. On the eastern shore lies Isla Vilama directly on the shores of the lake; this site features a number of lithic tools and appears to have been used by flamingo hunters.
