= Kari-Kari (caldera) =

Miocene caldera in the Potosi department, Bolivia

Coordinates: 19°40′S 65°40′W

Kari-Kari is a Miocene caldera in the Potosi department, Bolivia. It is part of the El Fraile ignimbrite field of the Central Volcanic Zone of the Andes. Volcanic activity in the Central Volcanic Zone has generated 44 volcanic centres with postglacial activity and a number of calderas, including the Altiplano-Puna volcanic complex.

Kari-Kari is a caldera whose dimensions are variously considered to be 12 by 32 kilometres (7.5 mi × 19.9 mi) or 15 by 20 kilometres (9.3 mi × 12.4 mi). After emplacement of the caldera, intrusive activity generated the Kari-Kari dome which was originally considered to be a batholith. Mineralization reactions have formed a number of mineral deposits at Cerro Rico and inside the caldera.

== Geography and structure ==
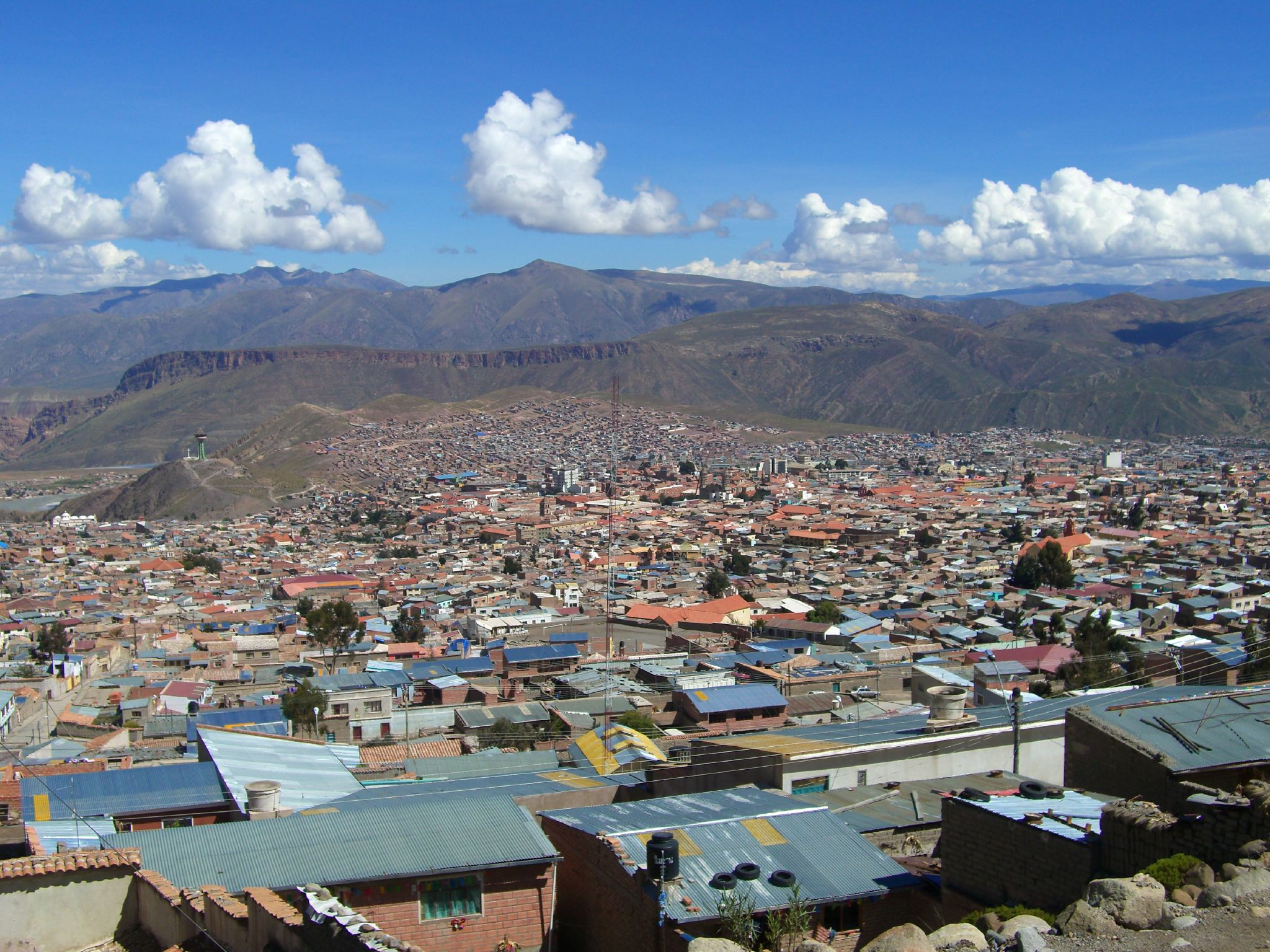
The city of Potosi is located close to or above the Kari-Kari caldera.

Kari-Kari is located close to Potosi, according to one reconstruction the city lies within the caldera. With an age of 21,000,000 years it is the oldest caldera structure that has been identified with unaided satellite imagery. It is part of the ignimbrite province of the Miocene Central Andes, which includes also the Altiplano-Puna volcanic complex with an estimated volume of 11,000–13,000 cubic kilometres (2,600–3,100 cu mi). Kari-Kari belongs to a more peraluminous domain of the ignimbrite provinces of the Central Andes, which also includes the Los Frailes ignimbrite field. Specifically, Kari-Kari is located in the Eastern Cordillera. Other ignimbrite fields north of 21° southern latitude are the Macusani (10,000,000–6,700,000 years ago in Peru) and Morococala (~8,000,000–6,000,000 years ago in Bolivia) fields. These ignimbrites are part of one domain of the Central Volcanic Zone, the other two domains are the principal andesitic volcanic arc and a scattered back-arc volcanic region. Volcanic activity within the Kari-Kari-Fraile region may be influenced by extensional tectonics.

The Kari-Kari caldera is ellipse-shaped and has a granitoid complex also named Kari-Kari at its centre. The caldera itself has dimensions of 12 by 32 kilometres (7.5 mi × 19.9 mi). Other dimensions given are 15 by 20 kilometres (9.3 mi × 12.4 mi). The caldera has a so-called trapdoor morphology. Outflow sheets surround the caldera on its northern and northwestern side. The Kari-Kari dome was originally assumed to be a batholith; later it is being interpreted as a resurgent ignimbrite structure. It has dimensions of 36 by 18 kilometres (22 mi × 11 mi) and is formed by a pluton inside the welded ignimbrite, reaching thicknesses of over 1,000 metres (3,300 ft), with a total uplift of about 600 metres (2,000 ft). The dome reaches altitudes of over 5,000 metres (16,000 ft), and effects of glaciation and moraine cover are noticeable and did conceal the true nature of the dome for a while. Farther south a true intrusion called the Kumurana is also located. The Cerro Rico intrusion is found west of Kari-Kari and was previously linked to the Kari-Kari ring fault, but mapping published in 2000 suggests that it formed away from the Kari-Kari ring fault and may be an independent centre. The Kari-Kari and Canteria tuffs and tuff-breccias are associated with the caldera. The formation of Kari-Kari may have been influenced by deep seated faults which form lineaments visible at the surface. The composition of the so-called Caracoles formation at Kari-Kari indicates the caldera may have been filled by a lake for a while. The Lago Chalviri is located within the caldera, at the foot of the dome. Laguna Ulistia is another lake in the caldera.

The Cordillera Andacaba area in the southern caldera is the site of several mining districts, which include lead-zinc or tin rich areals. The Kumurana mine is located in the southern part of the caldera, its mineralization occurred at temperatures of 213–413 °C (415–775 °F). The Cerro Rico stock has been extensively hydrothermally modified and a number of minerals are found there. It was a major source of silver for Spain in the 16th and 17th century. Mining has been ongoing for over 450 years. Starting from 1912 tin has been mined as well. Other mines in the dome are Lord Byron, Carandaiti, Mazuni, Illimani and Chaquirana.

== Geology ==
The Andean Volcanic Belt is typically subdivided into four sectors, the Northern Volcanic Zone, the Central Volcanic Zone and two southern Volcanic Zones. In Bolivia's Altiplano, volcanic activity commenced 26,000,000 years ago as part of the Central Volcanic Zone. Approximately 44 volcanic centres in the Central Volcanic Zone show evidence of post-glacial activity.

The main ignimbrite volcanic structure of the Central Volcanic Zone is the Altiplano-Puna volcanic complex. Other ignimbritic volcanic systems are the Galan and Panizos calderas, as well as older Oligocene ignimbrites in Sur Lipez.

Kari-Kari is part of a volcanic system with neighbouring Los Frailes volcanic system, which has been active starting from 25,000,000 to recent times over six phases, covering a surface area of 8,500 square kilometres (3,300 sq mi). Kari-Kari is the earliest known caldera in the Eastern Cordillera. No volcanic ignimbrites younger than 3,800,000 million years are found in the Eastern Cordillera, although in the Frailes region volcanic activity has continued into the Holocene with the Nuevo Mundo volcano. Alternatively, Kari-Kari has been classified as a lower Miocene volcanic province that also includes Illimani and several other volcanic centres.

The basement has been analyzed at the neighbouring centre of Cerro Rico, where Ordovician shales and other Cretaceous and Tertiary formations form much of the basement. Three different cratons named Arequipa-Antofalla, Brazilian and Pampean underpin Bolivia and the Huarina belt, which is the zone that separates these cratons. Rocks from the cratons have influenced the composition of Cerro Rico stocks.

=== Composition ===
Kari-Kari has erupted welded tuffs that contain garnet. The so-called "moat deposit" also contains large clasts and an ash-fall deposit resulting from an eruption column collapse. The red-purple Canteria ignimbrite has similar composition but contains much less clastic components. The Kari-Kari tuffs fit the general pattern of El Fraile associated tuffs being Europium in Cerro Rico may have been contributed to by the Kari-Kari pluton. Potassium content in the rocks reaches 11%.

The Kari-Kari dome is formed by dacite-rhyodacite as well as granodiorite. Lead, tin and zinc form small veins in the dome. Fiammes of biotite and plagioclase stand out above the matrix that contains garnet and plagioclase. It also contains xenoliths both from Agua Dulce lavas and Paleozoic sediments. The Kumurana intrusion has a composition between granodiorite and quartz monzonite.

Overall, the Kari-Kari rocks are peraluminous and originated from the amphibolite-granulite segment of the crust under the influence of magmatic underplating. Differentiation along mafic and peraluminous phases formed the eventual magma. The magma was predominantly formed from crustal phases. SiO_{2} content per weight is between 58–65%. These rocks were subsequently subject to hydrothermal alteration by boron- and chlorine-rich fluids which in multiple stages formed the mineral veins.

== Eruptive history ==
Activity in the Kari-Kari and neighbouring Los Frailes ignimbrite plateau spans 17,000,000 – 2,000,000 years ago. The Kari-Kari tuffs themselves were dated 20,100,000 – 21,950,000 years ago. These crystal rich welded tuffs accumulated within the caldera and have a volume of about 500 cubic kilometres (120 cu mi).

The Kari-Kari dome and Kumurana plutons were formed between 23,000,000 and 21,000,000 years ago. The Agua Dulce volcanics are of similar ages as the Kari-Kari dome, as is the Canteria ignimbrite. A weighed age estimate for the Agua Dulce, Kari-Kari, Kumurana and Canteria formations is 21,400,000 ± 400,000 years ago. Older ages of 42,510,000 to 45,480,000 are found in dykes and may reflect the age at which the pluton was emplaced. The Cerro Rico intrusion is 7,000,000 years younger than the main Kari-Kari caldera.
