= El Angosto =

- Village
- Location within Jujuy Province Location within Argentina
- Coordinates: 21°52′36″S 66°11′12″W
- Country: Argentina
- Province: Jujuy
- Department: Santa Catalina
- Elevation: 3,581 m (11,749 ft)

Population (2010 Census)
  - Total: 25
- Time zone: UTC−3 (ART)
- CPA Base: Y 4513
- Area code: +54 388
- Climate: Dfc

El Angosto is a village located in the Santa Catalina Department of Jujuy Province, Argentina.

== Characteristics ==
The locality of El Angosto has the distinction of being the northernmost of all the towns in Argentina. It is located at an altitude of 3581 meters above sea level, in the Santa Catalina Department, in the Puna region, and close to the border with Bolivia, corresponding to the Sud Lípez Province in the Potosí Department, located in the south-west of the republic. The international jurisdictional change there is marked by the bed of San Juan del Oro River. The town is located next to a creek that discharges its runoff into the mentioned river, which belongs to the Río de la Plata Basin.
