= Guadalupe, Sud Lípez =

Guadalupe
- Location in Bolivia
- Coordinates: 21°50′59″S 66°30′50″W
- Country: Bolivia
- Department: Potosí Department
- Province: Sud Lípez Province
- Municipality: San Antonio de Esmoruco Municipality
- Canton: Guadalupe Canton

Population (2001)
  - Total: 184

Guadalupe is a village in the Bolivian Potosí Department. It is the seat of the Guadalupe Canton, one of the two cantons of the San Antonio de Esmoruco Municipality which is the third municipal section of the Sud Lípez Province.

The village is located 40 km south-east of the provincial capital San Pablo de Lípez at an elevation of 4,173 m amsl at a tributary of Río San Juan del Oro.
