= Muruq'u =

Mountain in Bolivia

- Location within Bolivia

Highest point
- Elevation: 5,681 m (18,638 ft)
- Coordinates: 21°51′55″S 66°36′22″W

Geography
- Location: Bolivia, Potosí Department, Sud Lípez Province
- Parent range: Andes

Muruq'u (Quechua for ball (of yarn, wool), Hispanicized spelling Morokho) is a 5,681-metre-high (18,638 ft) mountain in the Andes of Bolivia. It is situated in the Potosí Department, Sud Lípez Province, in the north of the Esmoruco Municipality, southwest of Guadalupe. Muruq'u lies southeast of P'aqu Urqu and Waqrayuq.

Muruq'u is a volcano of early Miocene age, constructed between the Lipez and Cerro Bonete volcanoes north of Cerro Panizos. Volcanic activity commenced with explosive eruptions generating fall deposits and was followed by the extrusion of lava domes and lava flows.
