= Cerro Bonete (Lipez) =

Mountain in Bolivia

Coordinates: 21°45′S 66°29′W

Cerro Bonete is a volcano in Sur Lipez. It is part of the Cordillera de Lipez and is 5,630 metres (18,470 ft) high. The volcano is of Miocene age and formed by potassium-rich felsic rocks. It is associated with the 15 mya South Lípez ignimbrites.

Volcanism in the area occurred in two phases, an earlier andesitic phase called the Rondal formation and during the Quechua orogeny a second phase associated with rhyodacite forming lava domes, lava flows and pyroclastic flows (up to 700 metres (2,300 ft) thick). The formation of the massif was preceded by the eruption of dacitic ignimbrite 15 mya. These structures are mined, with mines including the Bolivar and Lipẽna mines.

== See also ==
- Cerro Morokho
