= P'aqu Urqu (Bolivia) =

Mountain in Bolivia

- Location within Bolivia

Highest point
- Elevation: 5,182 m (17,001 ft)
- Coordinates: 21°48′00″S 66°39′33″W

Geography
- Location: Bolivia, Potosí Department, Sud Lípez Province
- Parent range: Andes

P'aqu Urqu (Quechua p'aqu meaning blond, fair, a color similar to gold, and urqu meaning mountain. "'blond' or slightly golden mountain", Hispanicized spelling Paco Orkho) is a 5,182-metre-high (17,001 ft) mountain in the Andes of Bolivia. It is located in the Potosí Department, Sud Lípez Province, San Pablo de Lípez Municipality, southwest of San Pablo de Lípez. P'aqu Urqu lies between the mountains Yuraq Urqu and Yana Urqu in the northwest and Waqrayuq in the southeast.

A little river named Ñañu Mayu ("slim river", Nanu Mayu) originates northeast of the mountain. It flows to the west.
