= Q'illu Salli =

Mountain in Bolivia

- Location within Bolivia

Highest point
- Elevation: 4,918 m (16,135 ft)
- Coordinates: 21°43′06″S 66°32′37″W

Geography
- Location: Bolivia, Potosí Department, Sud Lípez Province
- Parent range: Andes

Q'illu Salli (Quechua q'illu yellow, salli sulfur, "yellow sulfur", also spelled Khellu Salli) is a 4,918-metre-high (16,135 ft) mountain in the Andes of Bolivia. It is situated in the Potosí Department, Sud Lípez Province, San Pablo de Lípez Municipality. Q'illu Salli lies south-east of San Pablo de Lípez, south-west of the mountain Kuntur Wasi and south of the river Lluch'a Mayu (Llucha Mayu).
