= Laguna Colorada (caldera) =

Volcano in Bolivia

Coordinates: 22°15′S 67°30′W

Laguna Colorada is an ignimbrite shield of the Altiplano-Puna volcanic complex at an altitude of 5,000 metres (16,000 ft) in the Potosi Department of Bolivia.

Laguna Colorada is a c. 40-kilometre-wide (25 mi) ignimbrite shield that was formerly also known as Panizos (not to be confused with Cerro Panizos). The shield is not clearly associated with a caldera but appears to contain a sag structure. The ignimbrite field is bordered by the Laguna Colorada to the west, Cerro Torque in the north, and Quetena to the east; Laguna Colorada is also the origin of the name of the shield. Likewise, the Tatio formation at El Tatio originates from eruptions at Laguna Colorada; however, the 700,000-year-old Tatio ignimbrite is considered to be separate. An older ignimbrite was erupted 2.21 ± 0.05 million years ago.

An ignimbrite is associated with Laguna Colorada. This ignimbrite was erupted 1.98 million years ago and has a volume of 60 cubic kilometres (14 cu mi) dense rock equivalent, covering a surface of about 1,100 square kilometres (420 sq mi). Several fall deposits occur both within and below the ignimbrite. This ignimbrite is also known as the Tatio ignimbrite and given a volume of 150 cubic kilometres (36 cu mi) dense rock equivalent, or the Aguadita tuffs. The ignimbrite is one of the youngest in the region and keeps a noticeable texture in high-altitude images. Deposits perhaps correlated to this ignimbrite have been recovered in the Quebrada de Humahuaca region.

The active geothermal fields of El Tatio and Sol de Manana are located around the Laguna Colorada system. As of 2018, a pilot geothermal power project was underway at Laguna Colorada. An electrical conductivity anomaly beneath Laguna Colorada has been interpreted either as new magma or hydrothermally altered material. Recent satellite imagery has shown that Laguna Colorada is subsiding at a rate of 4 millimetres per year (0.16 in/year), with the subsidence encompassing the area of the Laguna Colorada ignimbrite and covering a diameter of 20 kilometres (12 mi).
