= San Antonio de Esmoruco Municipality =

- Municipality
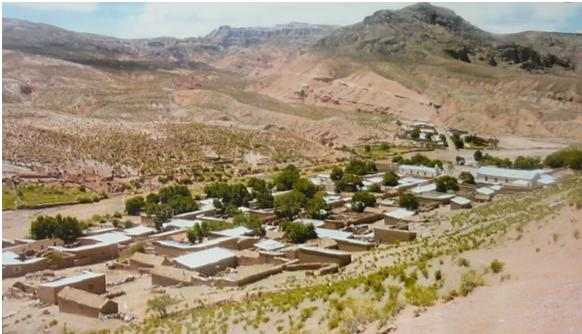
- San Antonio de Esmoruco

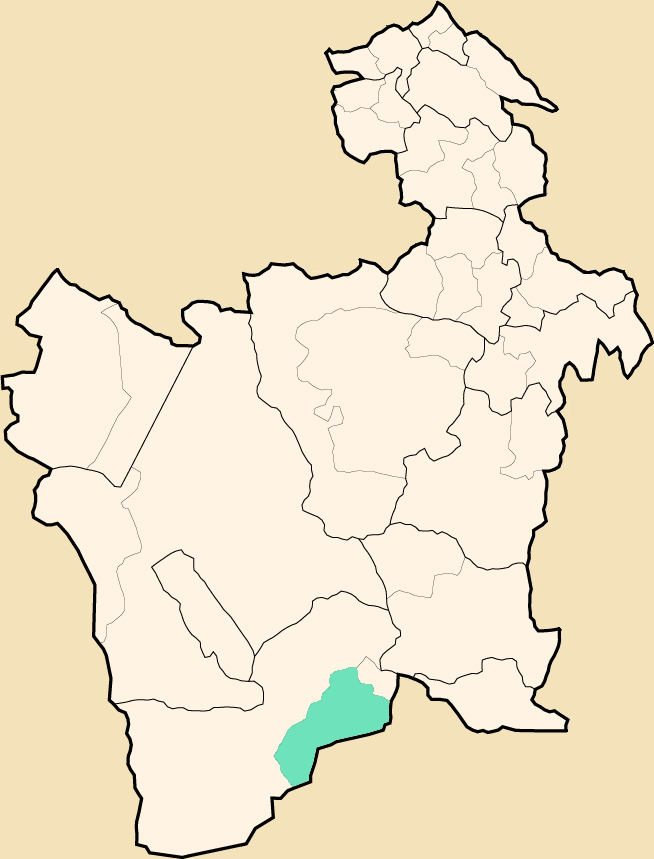
- Location within Potosí Department

- Location within Bolivia
- Coordinates: 22°3′S 66°38′W
- Country: Bolivia
- Department: Potosí Department
- Province: Sur Lípez Province
- Seat: San Antonio de Esmoruco
- Elevation: 14,400 ft (4,400 m)

Population (2001)
  - Total: 1,666
  - Ethnicities: Quechua
- Time zone: UTC-4 (BOT)

San Antonio de Esmoruco is the third municipal section of the Sur Lípez Province in the Potosí Department in Bolivia. Its seat is San Antonio de Esmoruco.

== Subdivision ==
The municipality consists of the following cantons:

- Guadalupe Canton – 497 inhabitants (2001)
- San Antonio de Esmoruco Canton – 1,169 inhabitants

== The people ==
The people are predominantly indigenous citizens of Quechua descent.

Ethnic group	%
Quechua	88.4
Aymara	0.5
Guaraní, Chiquitos, Moxos	0.0
Not indigenous	10.9
Other indigenous groups	0.2

== See also ==
- Guadalupe, Sud Lípez
- Muruq'u
- Nina Urqu
- Waqrayuq
