= Cusi Cusi =

- Village
- Location within Jujuy Province Location within Argentina
- Coordinates: 22°20′24″S 66°29′31″W
- Country: Argentina
- Province: Jujuy
- Department: Santa Catalina; Rinconada
- Elevation: 3,800 m (12,500 ft)

Population (2010 Census)
  - Total: 243
- Time zone: UTC−3 (ART)
- CPA Base: Y 4643
- Area code: +54 388
- Climate: Dfc

Cusi Cusi is a village located in the Santa Catalina and Rinconada Department of Jujuy Province, Argentina.
