= Yana Urqu (Sud Lípez) =

Mountain in Bolivia

- Location within Bolivia

Highest point
- Elevation: 4,623 m (15,167 ft)
- Coordinates: 21°46′29″S 66°41′18″W

Geography
- Location: Bolivia, Potosí Department, Sud Lípez Province
- Parent range: Andes

Yana Urqu (Quechua yana black, urqu mountain, "white mountain", also spelled Yana Orkho) is a 4,623-metre-high (15,167 ft) mountain in the Andes of Bolivia. It is located in the Potosí Department, Sud Lípez Province, San Pablo de Lípez Municipality, south-west of San Pablo de Lípez. Yana Urqu lies between the little rivers Yana Mayu ("black river") in the north and Ñañu Mayu ("slim river", Nanu Mayu) in the south. It is situated south of the peak of Yuraq Urqu.
