= Waqrayuq =

Mountain in Bolivia

- Location within Bolivia

Highest point
- Elevation: 5,362 m (17,592 ft)
- Coordinates: 21°50′00″S 66°36′43″W

Geography
- Location: Bolivia, Potosí Department, Sud Lípez Province
- Parent range: Andes

Waqrayuq (Quechua waqra horn, -yuq a suffix to indicate ownership, "the one with a horn", Hispanicized spelling Huajrayoj) is a 5,362-metre-high (17,592 ft) mountain in the Andes of Bolivia. It is situated in the Potosí Department, Sud Lípez Province, in the north of the Esmoruco Municipality. Waqrayuq lies south-east of the mountain P'aqu Urqu and north-west of the mountain Muruq'u.
