= Morococala =

Volcanic field in Bolivia

Coordinates: 18°10′S 66°45′W

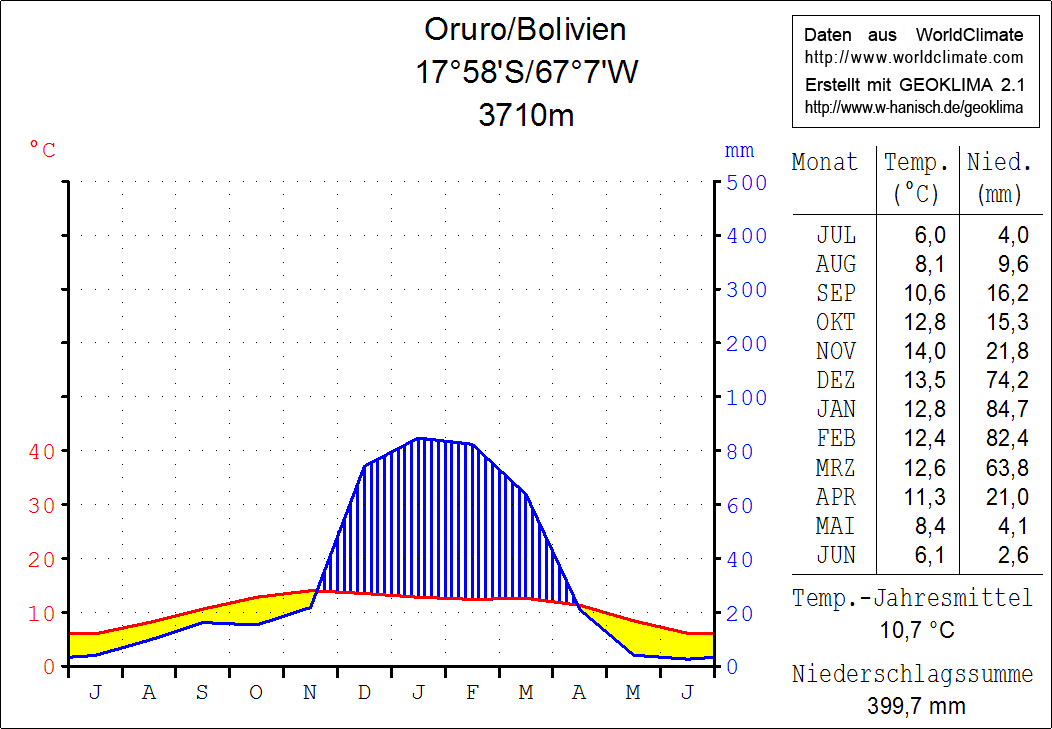

Morococala is a volcanic field in Bolivia, in the Department Oruro. It is formed by ignimbrites and associated volcanic features.

It is part of the chain of plutons that extends over the Cordillera Real and the Cordillera Occidental and are the sites of mining activity.

== Geography and geomorphology ==
It lies in the Cordillera Occidental. The city of Oruro lies northwest of Morococala, and the town of Llallagua is just south.

Morococala consists of a high plateau, and is a field consisting of ignimbrites and tuffs covering an area of about 1,400 square kilometres (540 sq mi).These form sequences with thicknesses on average less than 100 metres (330 ft). This field covers a surface area of 1,500 square kilometres (580 sq mi). The presence of two calderas has been inferred, one at Tankha Tankha in the northern part of the field and one at Condoriri in the southern part of the field. The Tankha Tankha caldera has a resurgent dome which has erupted domes and lava flows. Other volcanic landforms in the field are lava domes. Mines are located at San Pablo, Morococala and Japo.

Morococala is part of the so-called Bolivian tin belt, a string of plutons of Permian to Pliocene age extending from Peru over Bolivia to Argentina. These may or may not be associated with surface volcanic features but contain many mineral deposits. Some areas are associated with Late Miocene ignimbrites, such as Morococala and Los Frailes Plateau; mineralizations at Morococala are in the sediment layers associated with volcanic structures. Bolivia is the sixth-largest tin producer in the world, and the Huanuni mine in Morococala contributes about half of Bolivia's tin production. Apart from tin, these volcanoes were the source of abundant lithium deposits in the region. Morococala is part of the Neogene Ignimbrite Province of the Andes, which covers an area of about 300,000 square kilometres (120,000 sq mi); the back-arc region alone where Morococala lies emplaced more than 10,000 cubic kilometres (2,400 cu mi) during the past 23 million years.

== Composition ==
Tuffs are gray to white and typically rich in crystals in a mostly devitrified matrix.

The rocks of Morococala are dominantly dacite and rhyodacite. There is a north-south gradient with the larger northern part of the field being latitic and the smaller southern part rhyolitic. Phenocrysts include biotite, feldspar and quartz. In addition, the peraluminous minerals andalusite, cordierite and muscovite. Hydrothermal alteration has occurred on these rocks.

== Basement ==
The basement under Morococala is formed by the Proterozoic-age Arequipa-Antofalla block. Various Silurian and Devonian sedimentary formations exist in the area as well. A number of subvolcanic intrusions of Oligocene to Miocene age are also found there.

== Eruptive history ==
The oldest date obtained on intrusive rocks at San Pablo is 23.3 ± 0.4 million years ago. Hydrothermal alteration occurred later, 20.2 ± 0.35 million years ago. The ignimbrite was deposited much later, 6 million years ago.

Three different stages of ignimbritic volcanism have been delineated by argon-argon dating. The first and oldest occurred 8.4 million years ago and formed the rhyolitic tuffs. The second 6.8 million years ago also formed a rhyolitic tuff and originated from the Condoriri caldera. The third 6.4 million years ago originated from the Tankha Tankha caldera. 8-7 million years old tephras found at Pisco in Peru might originate at Morococala or more likely at Macusani.

== See also ==
- List of volcanic fields
