= Yuraq Urqu (Bolivia) =

Mountain in Bolivia

- Location within Bolivia

Highest point
- Elevation: 4,504 m (14,777 ft)
- Coordinates: 21°44′55″S 66°41′19″W

Geography
- Location: Bolivia, Potosí Department, Sud Lípez Province
- Parent range: Andes

Yuraq Urqu (Quechua yuraq white, urqu mountain, "white mountain", also spelled Yuraj Orkho) is a 4,504-metre-high (14,777 ft) mountain in the Andes of Bolivia. It is situated in the Potosí Department, Sud Lípez Province, San Pablo de Lípez Municipality, southwest of San Pablo de Lípez. Yuraq Urqu lies between the Qullpa Mayu ("salty river", Kollpamayu) in the north and the Yana Mayu ("black river") in the south, north of Yana Urqu.
