= San Antonio de Esmoruco =

- Town
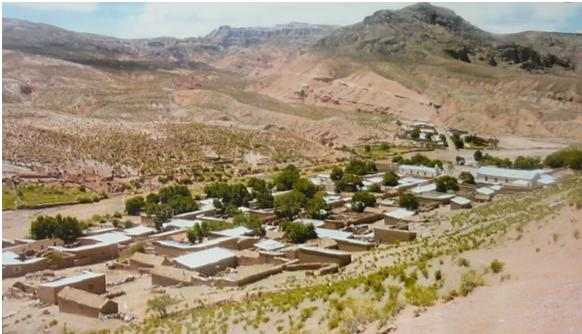

- Location within Bolivia
- Coordinates: 21°57′S 66°31′W
- Country: Bolivia
- Department: Potosí Department
- Province: Sur Lípez Province
- Municipality: San Antonio de Esmoruco Municipality
- Elevation: 12,185 ft (3,714 m)

Population (2010)
  - Total: 720
- Time zone: UTC-4 (BOT)

San Antonio de Esmoruco is a small town in Bolivia.
