= Macusani (volcano) =

Volcanic field in Peru

Macusani is a volcanic field in the Carabaya Province of Peru. It is formed by ignimbrites filling basins in the mountain range, with a total remnant volume of 430 cubic kilometres (100 cu mi). Some granitic stocks are also found there. A notable mineral found in the field is macusanite; indeed the field is notable for the unusual rock composition.

Macusani is not part of the principal volcanic arc, it belongs to the so-called "inner volcanic arc" of the eastern Cordillera. It is not clear why volcanism occurred in the Macusani region.

== Geography and geology ==
The Macusani volcanics are located in the Carabaya Province, Puno Department of Peru. The towns of Macusani, Crucero and Ananea lie in the region. The Macusani River flows east of the field, and the 5,000–6,000 metres (16,000–20,000 ft) high mountain range surrounds the area, forming a quadratic depression.

The Macusani volcanics lie in the Cordillera de Carabaya. There, on the western foot of the Oriental Cordillera north of Lake Titicaca, ignimbrites fill out basins like Cojata-Ulla Ulla, Crucero, Macusani and Picotani, of which the Macusani basin is the largest. These are separated by topographic ridges. The Macusani basin is covered by 860 square kilometres (330 sq mi) of pyroclastic flows at an altitude of 4,400 metres (14,400 ft). Part of the ignimbrites are hidden beneath glaciers on the western end of the Macusani basin. In addition, several granitic stocks are found there. The Crucero and Picotani field may have been one single volcanic field once, covering a surface area of 1,500 square kilometres (580 sq mi). The total volume of ignimbrites in the field is about 430 cubic kilometres (100 cu mi), not counting eroded material. Some calderas and fissures that may be the source of the Macusani rocks lie south of the Macusani basin, in the Nevado La Huana area; no caldera has been directly imaged though. The Macusani volcanics belong to the so-called "inner volcanic arc" in the Cordillera Oriental.

The Macusani ignimbrites are unwelded, unsorted and only weakly stratified. Individual flow sheets reach thicknesses of 10–100 metres (33–328 ft). They are rich in crystals and contain lithics and obsidian splinters; some of these may be the remnants of eroded lava flows.

The mid-Tertiary Revancha volcanic centre south of the basin is separate from the Macusani volcanics. Rather, it belongs to an intrusive event that occurred 20–27 million years ago over the Eastern Cordillera.

=== Composition ===
Macusani volcanics are primarily rhyolitic in terms of composition. Basaltic lava flows in the Picotani area are the only mafic volcanics. Their matrix is heavily altered to clay while phenocrysts are mostly preserved. Unusual minerals found in the volcanics include andalusite, muscovite, sillimanite and tourmaline. Such minerals have also been found in volcanic rocks of the Himalayas and Hercynian, although some differences appear to exist in the processes that form both rocks.

The Macusani volcanics have received worldwide attention since separate publications in 1984 highlighted the particular geochemistry of volcanic rocks of Macusani, including the large amounts of lithophilic and volatile elements. The origin of these volcanics was modelled to involve a metapelite crust.

The Macusani magmas contain two different phases, with different mineral compositions and different grades of crystal fractionation, pressure and temperature.

A number of uranium deposits have been found in the Macusani volcanics, including the Cerro Calvario, Chapi Alto – Pampa Suyupia, Chapi Bajo, Chilcuno VI, K3 and Pinocho mineralizations. As of 1992 Chapi Alto – Pampa Suyupia is the largest, with reserves back then being estimated at 10,000 tonnes (9,800 long tons; 11,000 short tons) triuranium octoxide.

Glass pebbles found in the volcanic rocks are the well-known "Macusanite" glass. These glasses have a variety of colours and are found in stream sediments. The "Paucartambo glass" is probably macusanite. This glass was proposed as a standard for fission track dating; research published in 1993 indicated that the cobbles have different ages and inhomogeneities that may render this use difficult. The macusanite has been found a distances of over 120 kilometres (75 mi) from Macusani as part of arrowheads; it was probably a highly desired good which was transported over large distances.

== Geology ==
Volcanism and tectonism in the Central Andes has been ongoing since the late Oligocene. Volcanism has been occurring in two broad regions, the principal volcanic arc and a secondary volcanic arc in the Cordillera Oriental whose origin is less clear. In that area, the Brazilian Shield subducts beneath the Andean orogen. The origin of the Macusani volcanics has been variously attributed to frictional heating of the subducting Brazilian shield, the subduction itself or a hotspot.

The basement in the Macusani area is formed by Ordovician-Devonian rocks and various Paleozoic layers which were folded during the Eocene as part of the Incaic deformation. Several phases of batholith and pluton emplacement occurred 350, 225, 185 and 80-70 million years ago.

== Eruptive history ==
Volcanic activity at Macusani occurred between 4 and 10 million years ago, with the oldest dates being 17.9 ± 0.6 and 16.7 ± 0.4 million years ago, and the latest dates being 4.3 ± 0.4 and 4.2 ± 1.5 million years by potassium-argon dating. More recent measurements on the same young samples obtained by argon-argon dating however has found ages of 6.7 ± 0.3 and 7.0 ± 0.4 million years ago. The ignimbrites themselves were erupted in two phases, a smaller one 10 ± 1 million years ago and a larger 7 ± 1 million years ago. The later volcanism led to the deposition of obsidian. A tephra deposit in the Pisco Formation has been tentatively linked to the Macusani volcanics.

The Macusani volcanics are the youngest volcanics of the Cordillera de Carabaya. By the time they were erupted the mountain range already existed. The Macusani volcanics are included into the Quenamari formation.

After volcanism ended, lacustrine deposition occurred in the area. Later during the Quaternary, it was partially covered by glaciers which have affected the area's appearance to this day.
