= Kuntur Wasi (Bolivia) =

Mountain in Bolivia

- Location within Bolivia

Highest point
- Elevation: 5,272 m (17,297 ft)
- Coordinates: 21°41′32″S 66°32′10″W

Geography
- Location: Bolivia, Potosí Department, Sud Lípez Province
- Parent range: Andes

Kuntur Wasi (Quechua kuntur condor, wasi house, "condor house") is a 5,272-metre-high (17,297 ft) mountain in the Andes of Bolivia. It is situated in the Potosí Department, Sud Lípez Province, San Pablo de Lípez Municipality. Kuntur Wasi lies north of the Lluch'a Mayu (Llucha Mayu) east of San Pablo de Lípez.
