= San Pablo de Lípez =

Coordinates: 21°41′S 66°38′W

- Town
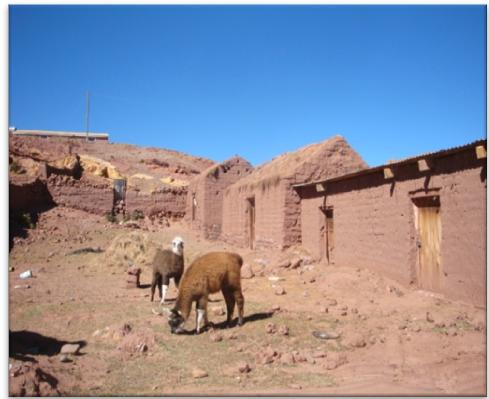
- Interactive map of San Pablo de Lípez
- Country: Bolivia
- Department: Potosí Department
- Province: Sur Lípez Province
- Municipality: San Pablo de Lípez Municipality

Population (2001)
  - Total: 221
- Time zone: UTC-4 (BOT)

San Pablo de Lípez is a small town in the Potosí Department of Bolivia. It is the seat of the Sur Lípez Province and of the San Pablo de Lípez Municipality.

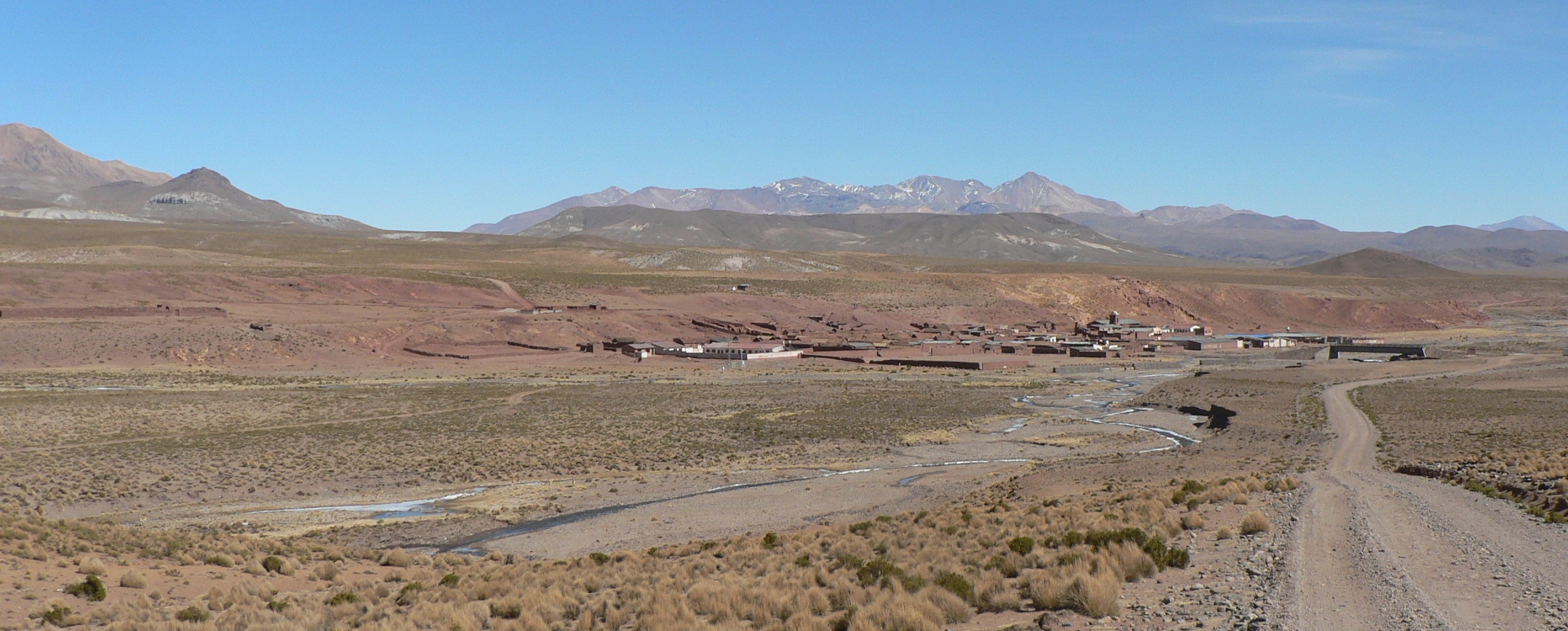
San Pablo de Lípez as seen from the northeast

== See also ==
- Kuntur Wasi
- Q'illu Salli
- Yana Urqu
- Yuraq Urqu
