= Suni K'ira =

Bolivian volcano

- Location within Bolivia

Highest point
- Elevation: 5,899 m (19,354 ft)
- Coordinates: 22°00′34″S 67°13′08″W

Geography
- Location: Bolivia; Potosí Department
- Parent range: Andes

Geology
- Rock age: Pleistocene
- Mountain type: Shield volcano

Suni K'ira (Quechua suni 'long', k'ira 'prop, support'; hispanicized spellings Sonequera, Soniquera, Suniquera, Suniquira) is a 5,899-metre-high (19,354 ft) shield volcano in Bolivia. It is located in the Potosí Department, Nor Lípez Province, Colcha "K" Municipality, and in the Sud Lípez Province, San Pablo de Lípez Municipality. It lies north of the Uturunku volcano.

The volcano rises 1,600–1,700 metres (5,200–5,600 ft) above the surrounding terrain. Suni K'ira is the source of an ignimbrite, and it features a caldera at the intersection of several faults. The volcano features cirques which were formerly considered to be craters, leading to the belief that eruptions occurred during the Holocene.

Rock samples taken from Suni K'ira consist of andesite and dacite. The former contains latite and quartz and the latter biotite and hornblende.

Polylepis tarapacana trees grow on its slopes.
