= Altiplano-Puna Magma Body =

Largest known active magmatic body

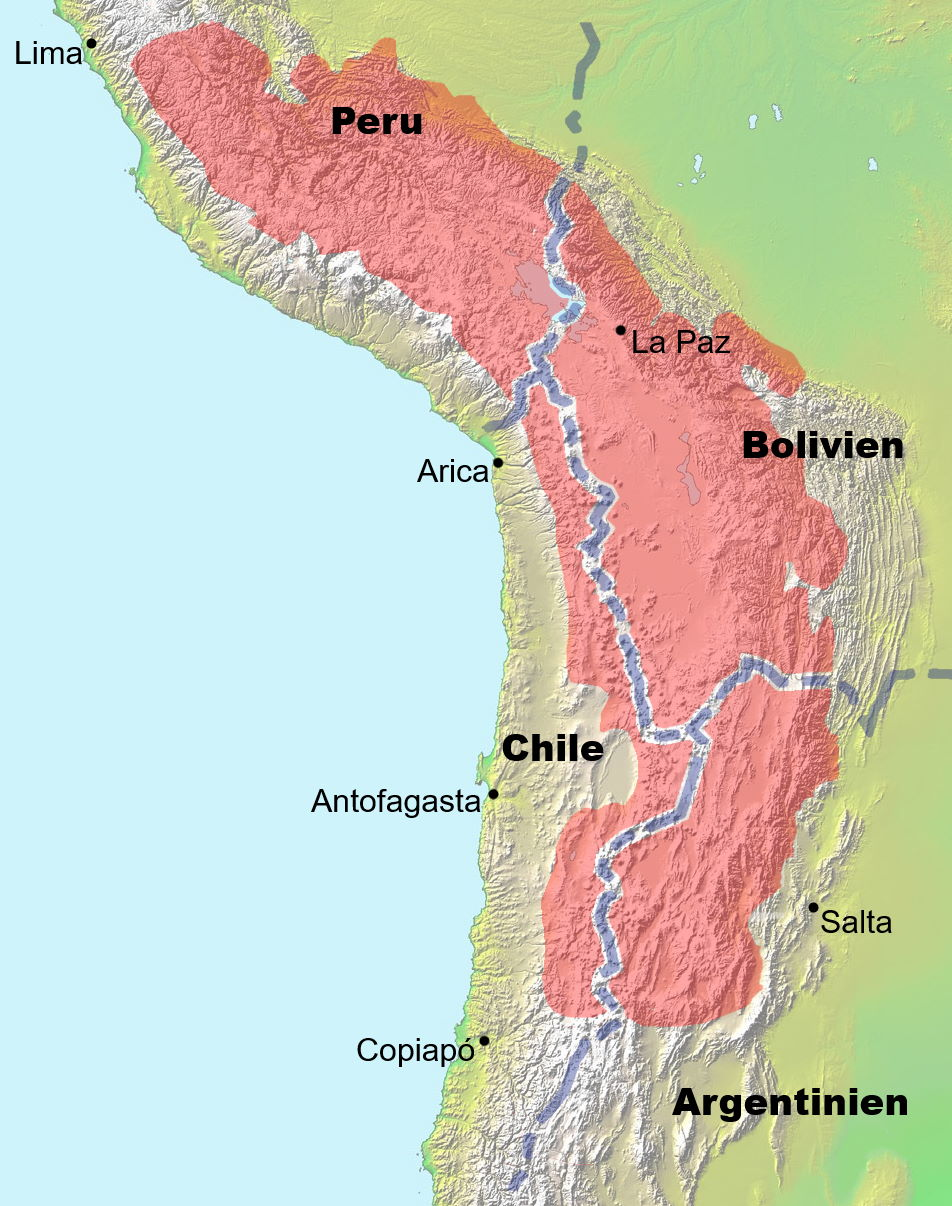
Location (in red) of the Altiplano-Puna plateau in South America

The Altiplano–Puna Magma Body (APMB) is a magma body located within the Altiplano–Puna plateau approximately 10–20 km (6.2–12.4 mi) beneath the Altiplano–Puna volcanic complex (APVC) in the Central Andes. High-resolution tomography shows it has a diameter of ~200 km (120 mi), a depth of 14–20 km (8.7–12.4 mi), and a total volume of ~500,000 km^{3} (120,000 mi^{3}), making it the largest known active magma body on Earth. Thickness estimates for the APMB are varied, with some as low as 1 km (0.62 mi), others around 10–20 km (6.2–12.4 mi), and some extending as far down as the Moho. The APMB is primarily composed of 7–10 wt% water andesitic melts, and the upper portion may contain more dacitic melts with partial melt percentages ranging from 10 to 40%. Measurements indicate that the region around the Uturuncu volcano in Bolivia is uplifting at a rate of ~10 mm/year, surrounded by a large region of subsidence. This movement is likely a result of the APMB interacting with the surrounding rock and causing deformation. Recent research demonstrates that this uplift rate may fluctuate over months or years and that it has decreased over the past decade. Various techniques, such as seismic, gravity, and electromagnetic measurements have been used to image the low-velocity zone in the mid-to-upper crust known as the APMB.

== Composition ==
The APMB is likely compositionally zoned with the lower 18–30 km (11–19 mi) containing andesitic melts and the upper 9–18 km (5.6–11.2 mi) containing dacitic melts. Estimates for the percentage of andesitic melt vary from 8 vol% on the low end and up to 30 vol% on the high end. These andesitic melts also have a high water content (~7–10 wt.% water) indicated by the high electrical conductivity measured in the APMB. Measurements for the partial melt percentage in the APMB also vary, with seismic imaging indicating that it is anywhere from 10 to 40% partial melt. For a magma body with ~20% partial melt, the viscosity is estimated to be <10^{16} Pa·s.

== Deformation ==
The Altiplano–Puna region around the Uturuncu volcano is experiencing a type of deformation termed sombrero uplift, which is a central zone of uplift surrounded by a region of subsidence. One potential explanation for this sombrero uplift pattern is the formation and growth of a large diapir arising from the APMB. Lower-density magma than the surrounding rocks is produced during partial melting in the APMB, causing a plume of buoyant magma to rise from the center of the magma body. This causes material to be removed from the APMB to feed the growing diapir, resulting in a region of subsidence surrounding the uplift zone.

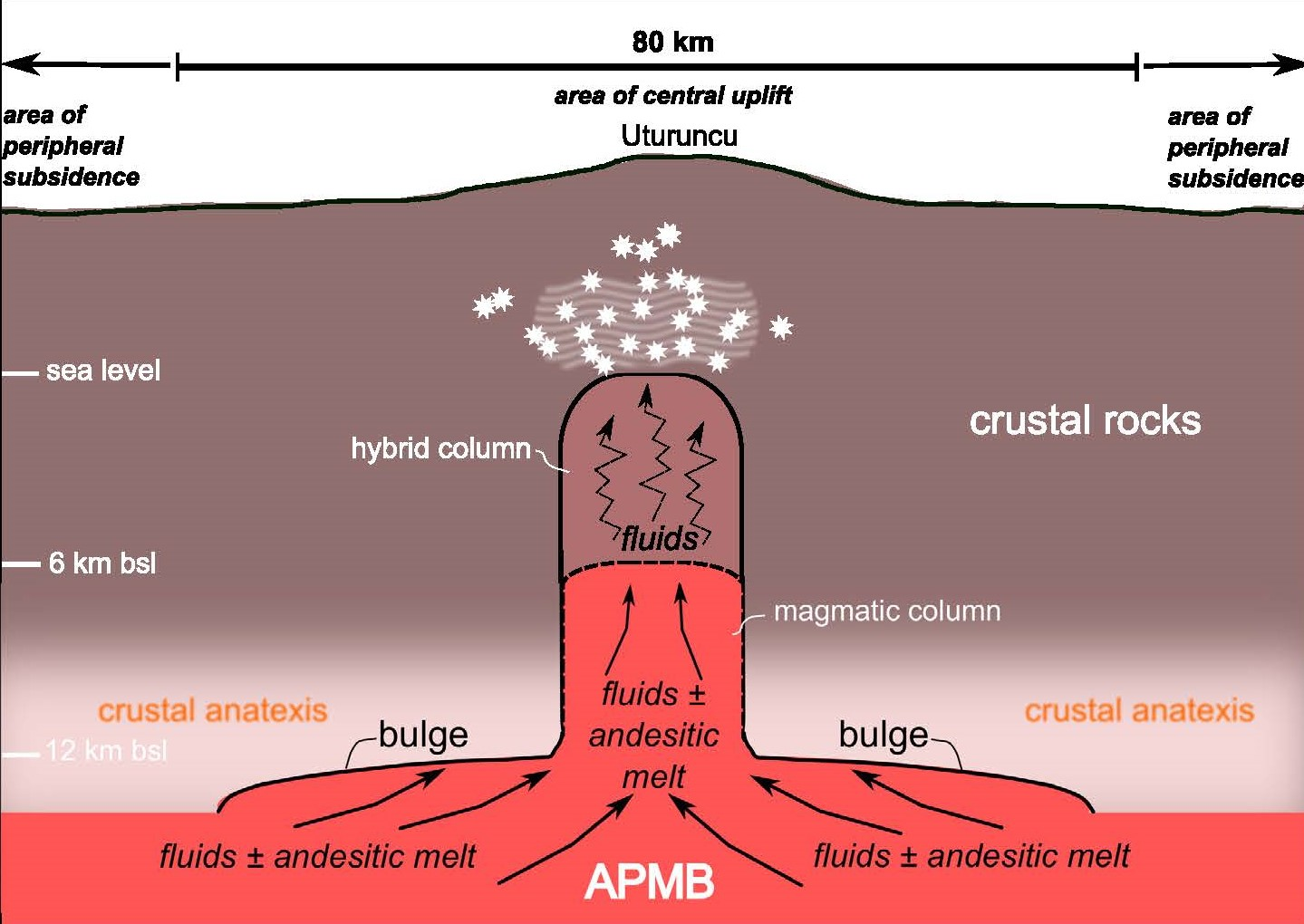
Deformation model showing the extent of the sombrero uplift pattern as well as one explanation for what is occurring beneath the surface.

Data collected between 1992 and 2010 demonstrates that the region is uplifting at ~10 mm/year and subsiding at a slower rate (only a few mm/year). More recent InSAR data, collected between September 2014 and December 2017, shows that the uplift rate over this period has decreased to 3–5 mm/year and may experience short-term velocity reversals. Additionally, there is evidence that the uplift and subsidence rates have balanced out over the past 16,000 years to create no net deformation. These aspects of the uplift and subsidence cannot be easily explained by the diapir model, so other possible mechanisms for driving the deformation are being investigated. One such mechanism that might explain the deformation is the movement of volatiles in a column connected to the APMB. Movement like this may explain the surface deformation rate that varies on monthly or yearly scales and appears to have resulted in no net deformation over longer periods.

== Imaging techniques ==
=== Seismic ===
Between 1996 and 1997, several broadband seismic stations were deployed over the Altiplano–Puna volcanic complex (APVC) in order to characterize the magmatic structures beneath the surface. These stations found a low-velocity region approximately 10–20 km (6.2–12.4 mi) beneath the surface that was interpreted to be a sill-like magma body associated with the APVC. Seismic studies and modeling continues to take place in this area, further constraining the extent and characteristics of this magma body.

=== Gravity ===
A 3D density model of the Central Andes was developed based on modeling of Bouguer anomalies; it provided a more detailed view of the region's lithospheric structure and an estimation of the amount of partial melt present in the APMB (~9%). Continued investigation of Bouguer anomaly data led to the discovery of a column-like, low-density structure extending from the top of the APMB with a diameter of approximately 15 km (9.3 mi).

=== Electromagnetic ===
Electromagnetic methods have also been used to investigate structures in the Andes as well as determine characteristics of the APMB. Magnetotelluric stations were deployed across the Central Andes and resolved a highly conductive region beneath the Altiplano–Puna plateau, which appeared to coincide with the low-velocity zone associated with the APMB. Further magnetotelluric studies showed that the region has low electrical resistivities of <3 Ω·m. Resistivity values in this range are interpreted to only occur with magma that contains a minimum of 15% andesitic melt. Additionally, these resistivity values indicate that the melt has a water content up to 10 wt.% H_{2}O, which makes up approximately 10% of the APMB.
