= Cordillera de Lípez =

Mountain range in Bolivia and Argentina

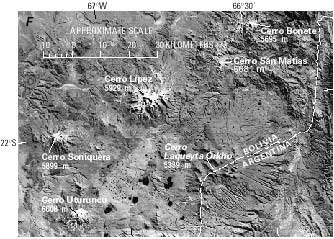
- A section of the Cordillera de Lípez in the extreme south of Bolivia at the boundary with Argentina

Highest point
- Peak: Uturuncu
- Elevation: 6,008 m (19,711 ft)
- Coordinates: 22°16′12″S 67°10′48″W

Geography
- Location within Bolivia Location within Argentina
- Countries: Bolivia and Argentina
- Range coordinates: 21°40′S 66°30′W
- Parent range: Andes

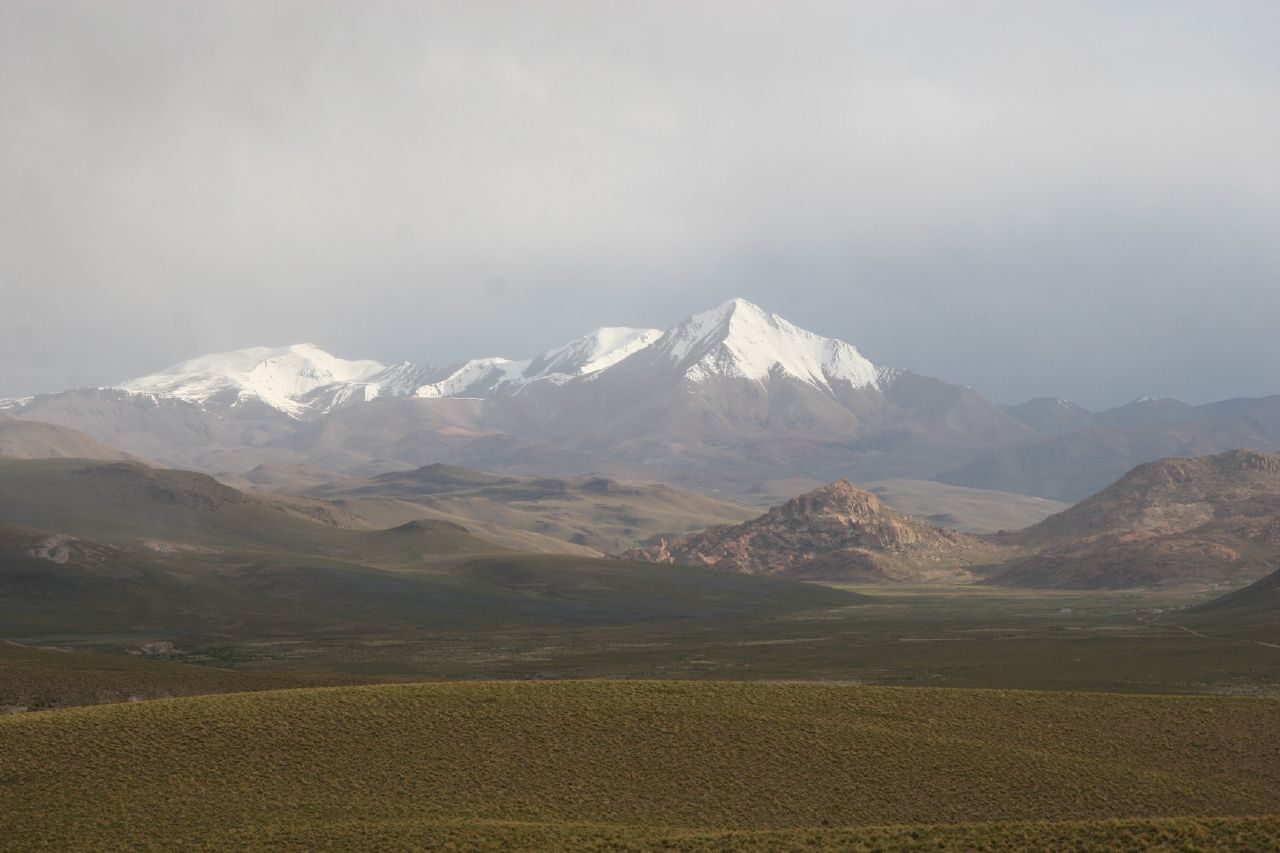
Cerro Lípez, 5,933 metres (19,465 ft)

The Cordillera de Lípez is a mountain range in southern Potosí, Bolivia, and northern Argentina, part of the Andes. The range covers an area of 23,404 km (14,543 mi) and runs in a northeast–southwest direction, between the parallels 22 degrees and 23 degrees, helping to form the boundary between Bolivia and Argentina. Thus the Cordillera de Lípez is a transverse range in the Andes, between the Cordillera Oriental and the Cordillera Occidental, creating the southern boundary of the Bolivian Altiplano.

The highest peak is Uturunku at 6,008 m (19,711 ft). Other important peaks are Cerro Lípez (5,933 m) sometimes misidentified as Nuevo Mundo (5,438 m); Soniquera (5,899 m) (sometimes misspelled as Soreguera); and Tinte (5,849 m) which is on the Bolivian-Argentine border. Despite the high elevations, there is no current glacier activity in the Cordillera de Lípez, just some semi-permanent snow fields.

== Notes ==
1. Brain, Y. "Climbs and Expeditions: Bolivia", American Alpine Journal (1999) p. 323.
