= Cerro Lípez =

Stratovolcano in Bolivia

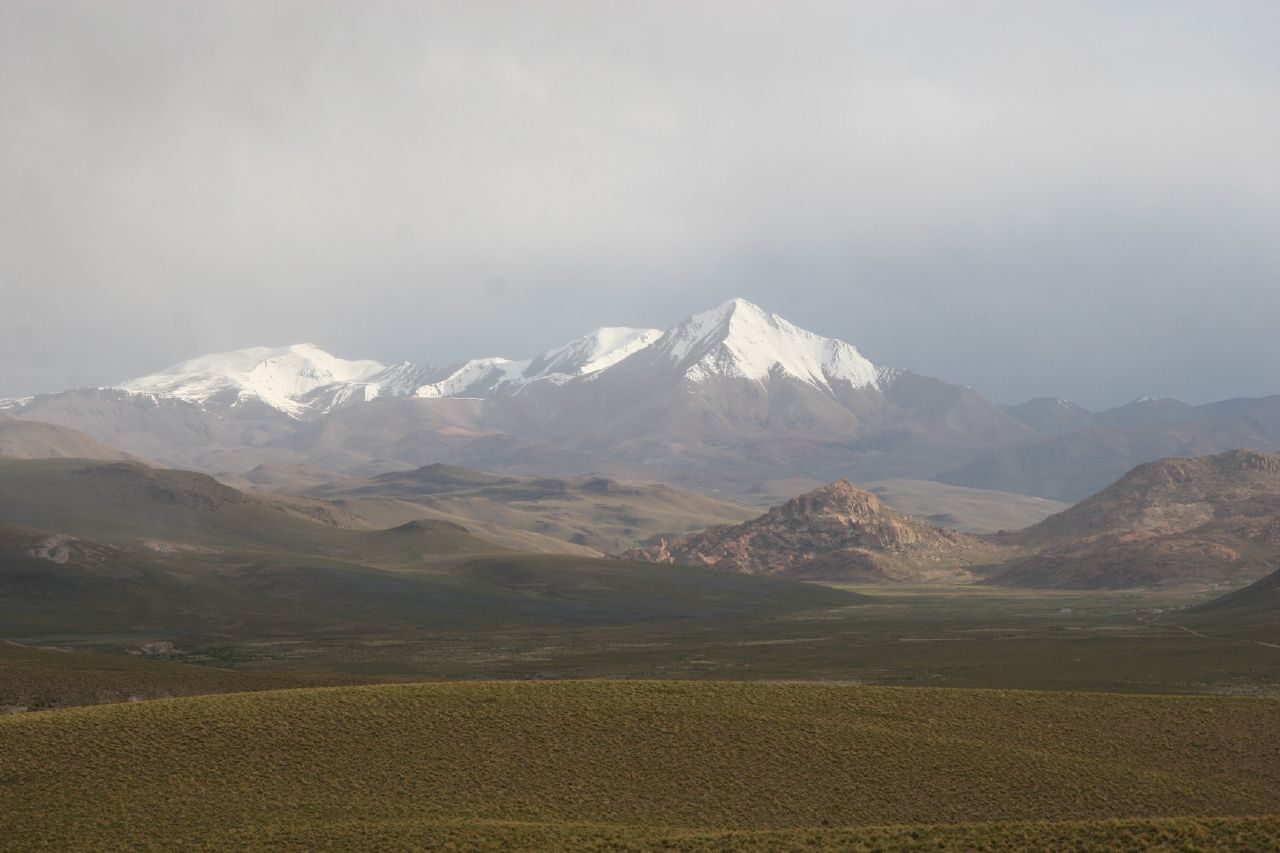
- Cerro Lípez as seen from the north.

Highest point
- Elevation: 5,933 m (19,465 ft)
- Prominence: 1,357 m (4,452 ft)
- Coordinates: 21°54′51″S 66°53′05″W

Geography
- Location: Sud Lípez province, Potosí Department, Bolivia
- Parent range: Cordillera de Lípez

Geology
- Mountain type: stratovolcano

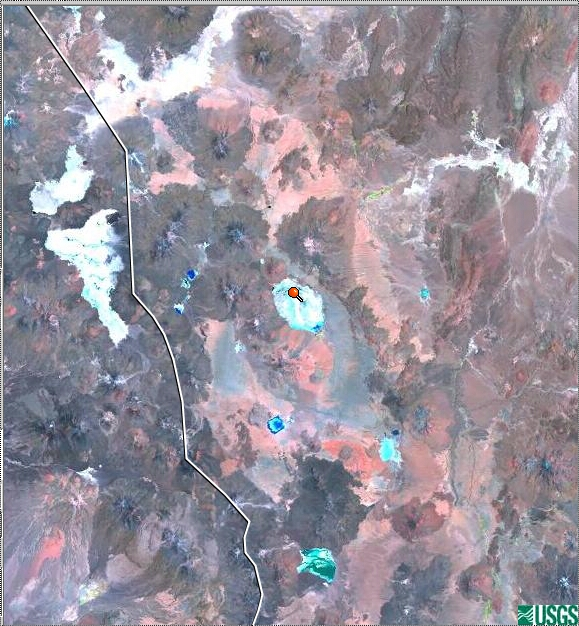
Landsat view of Cerro Lípez, with pin

Cerro Lípez (also Cerro Lipez) is a stratovolcano in the Cordillera de Lípez in the Sud Lípez Province of the Potosí Department in southwestern Bolivia. It has twin peaks and rises to 5,933 m. On some maps it is incorrectly labeled as Nuevo Mundo. Nuevo Mundo is in fact hundreds of kilometres to the northeast and five hundred metres shorter. The confusion came in part from a misidentification of the height of Nuevo Mundo.

== See also ==
- List of volcanoes in Bolivia
