= Santa Catalina Department =

Santa Catalina Departamento Santa Catalina
- Department
- Interactive map of Santa Catalina
- Country: Argentina
- Seat: Santa Catalina

Area
  - Total: 2,960 km^{2} (1,140 sq mi)

Population (2022)
  - Total: 2,646
  - Density: 0.894/km^{2} (2.32/sq mi)

Santa Catalina is a department of the province of Jujuy (Argentina).
