= Volcán Putana =

Mountain in Chile

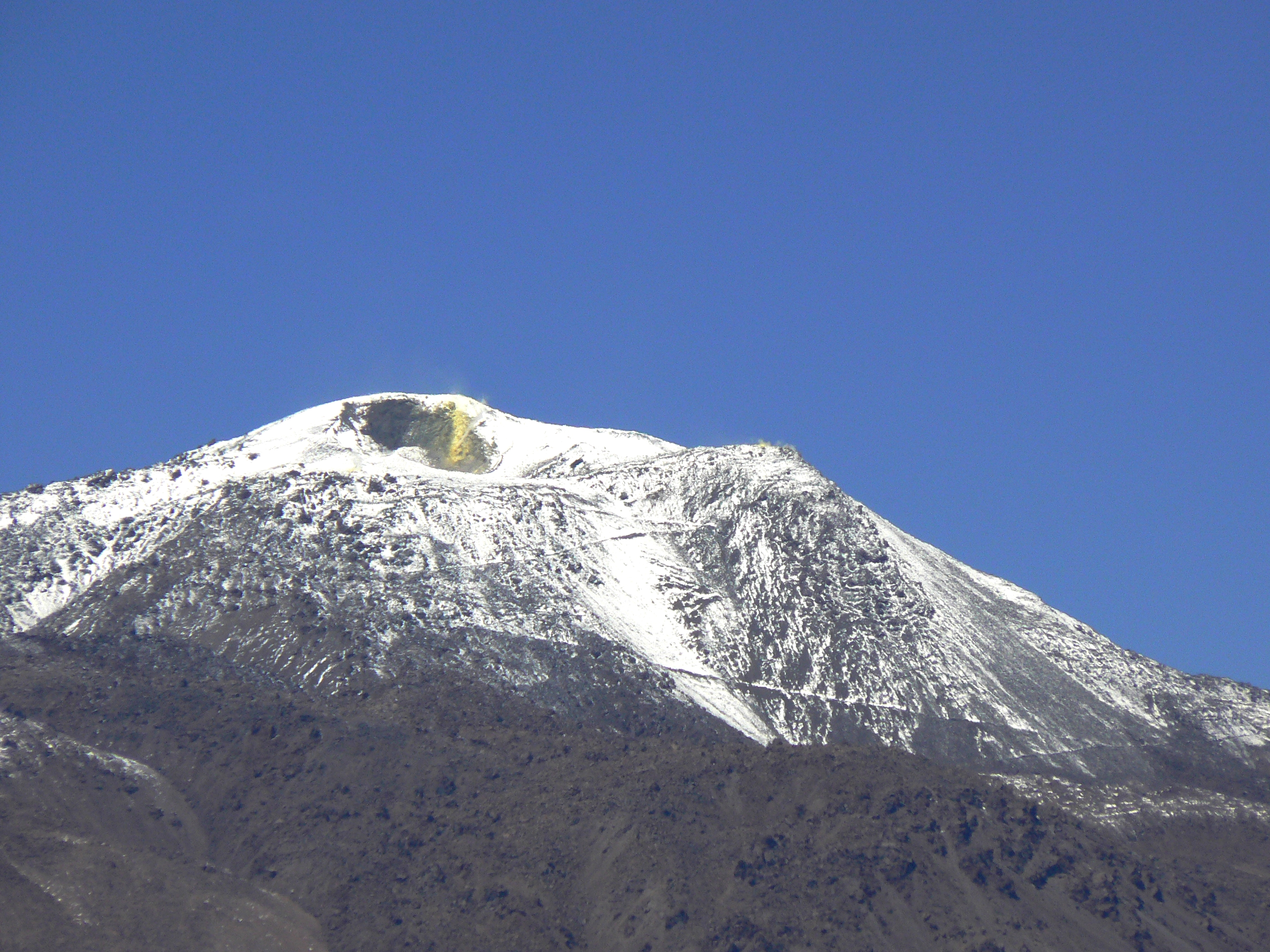
- Volcán Putana, with the summit fumaroles, sulfur deposits and the summit road all visible

Highest point
- Elevation: 5,884 m (19,304 ft)
- Coordinates: 22.557°S 67.853°W

Geography
- Location: Bolivia-Chile
- Parent range: Andes

Geology
- Mountain type: Stratovolcano
- Last eruption: 1810

Volcán Putana, sometimes referred to as Jorqencal or Machuca, is a stratovolcano located in the Central Volcanic Zone (CVZ) of the Andes on the border between Bolivia and Chile and close to the Sairecabur volcanic complex. Its summit is 5,884 metres (19,304 ft) above sea level and contains a summit crater with two smaller craters nested within it. Beneath the summit, the volcano features a number of lava domes and lava flows, some of which originated in flank vents.

While the occurrence of historical activity is unclear (aside from an episode in 2009–2010 where the edifice was uplifted by 4 centimetres (1.6 in)), the volcano features persistent and vigorous fumarolic activity that creates a large plume of gas above the summit. Sulfur deposited by the fumaroles has been mined.

== Context ==
Volcán Putana lies on the border between Chile and Bolivia, and is also known as Jorgencal, Jorjencal or Machuca. The area is remote and difficult to access and thus poorly studied.

Volcanism in the Central Andes is the consequence of the subduction of the Nazca Plate beneath the South American Plate and occurs in form of the 1,500 kilometres (930 mi) long Central Volcanic Zone, one of four volcanic belts in the Andes. The Peruvian and the Pampean "flat slab" segments separate this volcanic belt from its neighbours, the Northern Volcanic Zone to the north and the Southern Volcanic Zone south respectively.

Volcán Putana is part of the Central Volcanic Zone, which aside from this volcano contains a number of large calderas associated with silicic volcanism. Over 13 volcanoes in the Central Volcanic Zone have been active in historical time, out of about 69 with evidence of Holocene activity. Of these volcanoes Láscar is the most active volcano in the Central Volcanic Zone; a major eruption occurred there in 1993.

== The volcano ==
Volcán Putana is a 5,890 metres (19,320 ft) high volcano elongated from north to south. It is constructed by lavas and pyroclastic material, with effusive products such as lava domes and lava flows forming the bulk of the edifice. Most lava flows were viscous enough that they do not exceed 3 kilometres (1.9 mi) of length, older flows are longer. Younger lava flows occur on the western slope, and some lava flows appear to be younger than the last glacial age.

The summit contains a 500 metres (1,600 ft) wide summit crater which itself contains two smaller craters, one is 300 metres (980 ft) wide and lies on the northeastern side and the other with a width of 130 metres (430 ft) is in the centre of the summit crater. Lava flows/lava domes are emplaced in the southern part of the main summit crater, and there are deposits of past Vulcanian eruptions. Additional adventive vents occur on the slopes of Volcán Putana; a particularly noticeable fan-shaped flow northwest of Volcán Putana originated in such a flank vent.

The volcano forms part of a complex of ash flows and cones which covers a surface area of 600 square kilometres (230 sq mi). Volcán Putana was constructed on the Purificar and Tatio ignimbrites of Pliocene-Pleistocene age; the whole edifice is constructed around a pre-Holocene volcano. It is part of a cluster of volcanoes that extends south to Sairecabur, the densest such cluster in the Central Andes, and overlie the Cerro Chaxas lava dome complex.

Volcanic rocks found at Volcán Putana include basaltic andesite, andesite and dacite. Minerals contained in the rocks include pyroxene in the andesites and biotite and hornblende in the dacites.

Neighbouring mountains include the Cerros Aguita Blanca in the east, Cerro Amarillo in the southeast, Curiquinca south-southwest of Volcán Putana and Escalante and Cerro Colorado to the south-southwest. Curiquinca, El Apagado and Sairecabur together form a major volcanic group.

A 1985 map shows a persistent ice/snow cover on Volcán Putana. The slopes of Volcán Putana drain north into the west-flowing Río Aguita Blanca, east into the Salar de Chalviri and southeast into the Río Blanco and from there into the Laguna Verde-Laguna Blanca system. The Río Putana originates on the northern flank of Volcán Putana, which forms its headwaters. It joins with the Río Jauna to form the Río Grande, which in turn joins the Río Salado to form the Río San Pedro de Atacama that eventually drains into the Salar de Atacama.

== Eruptive history ==
The geologic history of Volcán Putana is unknown, due to the lack of detailed studies on the subject. The last eruption at Volcán Putana was reported from the late 19th century; one date given is 1810 with an uncertainty of 10 years and the eruption was described as a major one. Reports either of increased fumarolic activity or outright eruptions exist for 1810, 1886, 1960 and 1972. Reports of an eruption on 2 July 1972 ± 182 days are uncertain, and other opinions say that there was no historical eruption there.

Between late 2009 and early 2010, the volcano underwent an episode of deformation accompanied by earthquake swarms. Based on modelling, about 300,000 cubic metres (11,000,000 cu ft) of magma were intruded at a depth of 1 kilometre (0.62 mi) during this episode, lifting the ground by about 4 centimetres (1.6 in) over a diameter of 5 kilometres (3.1 mi). This shallow deformation may result from hydrothermal processes. Aside from this episode, Volcán Putana is seismically active, both in form of individual events, seismic swarms and triggered earthquakes; the 2010 Maule earthquake was accompanied by seismicity at Volcán Putana. Future eruptions are likely to have impacts confined to the edifice, and would feature mostly lava flows with minor amounts of pyroclastics.

=== Fumaroles ===
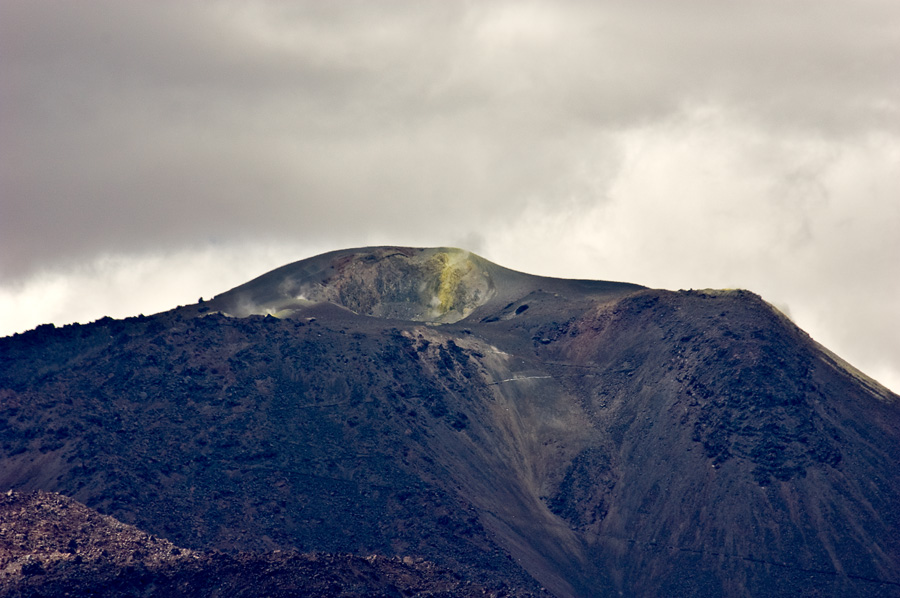
View to the crater, with the in-crater and out-of-crater fumaroles visible

Volcán Putana features active fumaroles, which generate a 100–500 metres (330–1,640 ft) high plume above the volcano. This plume was seen as far back as the 19th century. The fumaroles have different shapes, from vents that are only centimetres wide to large 10 metres (33 ft) wide openings. They occur in groups, in total four separate fumarole fields, two within the northeastern crater, one in the summit crater and one outside of the summit crater where about 30 individual fumaroles were reported in 1952. These fumaroles are visible as a thermal anomaly from space, but it is relatively weak with a temperature anomaly of only 5 K (9.0 °F).

These fumaroles exhale a mixture of hydrogen sulfide and sulfur dioxide, the latter being produced at a flux rate of 20,000–22,000 tonnes per year (55–60 t/d). In addition they contain hydrogen, hydrogen chloride, hydrogen fluoride and nitrogen, while carbon monoxide, methane and oxygen are only minor components. Temperatures of 82–88 °C (180–190 °F) have been measured, and the source appears to have temperatures of up to 500 °C (932 °F). The composition of the fumaroles indicates that the gases are ultimately of mainly magmatic origin, but interact with a slightly colder hydrothermal system before reaching the surface. A local anecdote has it that it trembles in Calama when the volcano is upset.

The fumarolic activity at Volcán Putana lays down deposits of sulfur on the volcano, including one 76 metres (250 ft) high cliff that was reported to be covered with sulfur in 1952. This sulfur was mined at the summit of the volcano, which is thus accessible by a road. Volcán Putana sulfur was noted to be extremely pure in that same year. It has been mined and transported down by truck from elevations of 5,600 metres (18,500 ft), one of the highest altitudes at which motor vehicles have been used. The Carnen sulfur mine is found on the southeastern flank, and more mines are found on neighbouring mountains. Operations in the Volcán Putana mine ceased in 1972.

== See also ==
- List of volcanoes in Bolivia
- List of volcanoes in Chile
- Cerros de Tocorpuri

== Bibliography ==
- González-Ferrán, Oscar (1995). Volcanes de Chile. Santiago, Chile: Instituto Geográfico Militar. p. 640 pp. ISBN 978-956-202-054-1.(Spanish)
