= Sairecabur =

Volcano between Bolivia and Chile

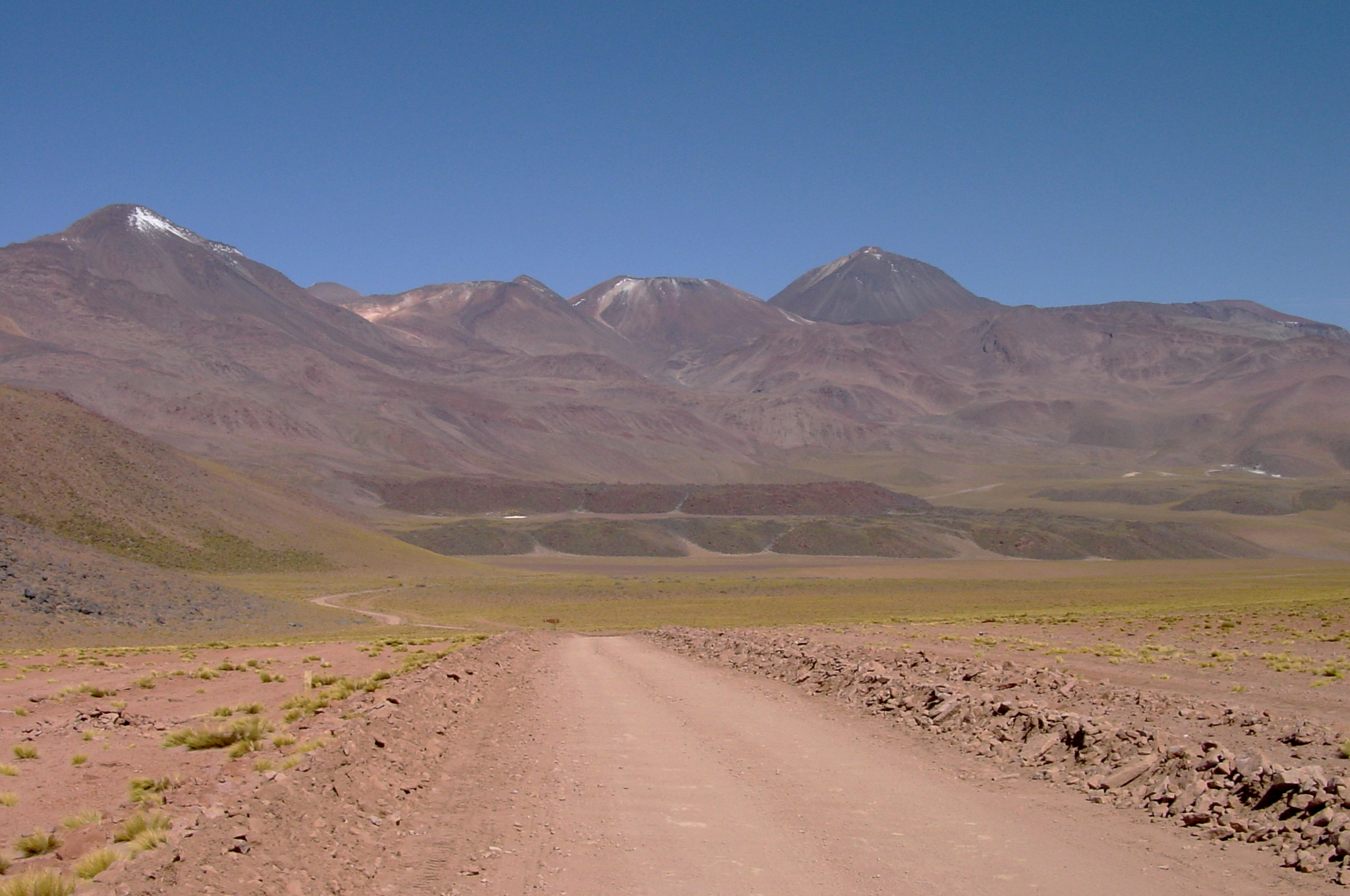
- Sairecabur and Saciel

Highest point
- Elevation: 5,971 m (19,590 ft)
- Prominence: 1,300 m (4,300 ft)
- Parent peak: Acamarachi
- Coordinates: 22°43′8″S 67°53′26″W

Geography
- Location: Bolivia–Chile border
- Parent range: Andes

Geology
- Mountain type: Stratovolcano

Climbing
- First ascent: Pre-Columbian

Sairecabur (Spanish pronunciation: [sajɾekaˈβuɾ]) is a volcano located on the frontier between Bolivia and Chile. It is part of the Andean Central Volcanic Zone. Sairecabur proper is 5,971 m (19,590 ft) high; other mountains in the range are 5,722 m (18,773 ft) high Curiquinca, 5,819 m (19,091 ft) high Escalante and 5,748 m (18,858 ft) high Cerro Colorado, all of which have erupted a number of lava flows. Also in close proximity to Sairecabur lie the volcanic centres Licancabur, Putana and Juriques.

Sairecabur proper is accompanied by a 4.5 km (2.8 mi) wide caldera. Before the formation of this caldera the volcano may have been 7,000 m (23,000 ft) high and thus one of the highest volcanoes on Earth. After the formation of this caldera lava effusion occurred during the Pleistocene and Holocene; there is no reported historical activity, however. Eruption products on Escalante and Sairecabur include andesite and dacite. The climate is dry, cold and very sunny.

An Inca sanctuary has been found on Sairecabur, and sulfur mines exist in the mountain chain. More recently, the Receiver Lab Telescope was installed on the volcano. It is the highest submillimeter telescope in the world at an altitude of 5,525 m (18,127 ft).

== Geology and geography ==
=== Geological context ===
West of South America, the Nazca Plate subducts beneath the South America Plate. This process has formed the Andean Volcanic Belt, which is subdivided into the Northern Volcanic Zone, the Central Volcanic Zone and the Southern Volcanic Zone. These belts have different underlying crusts and thus have different typical magma compositions. These volcanic zones are separated from each other by zones where there is no volcanism, associated with a shallow dip of the seismic zone of the subducting plate.

Sairecabur is part of the Andean Central Volcanic Zone (CVZ). A number of stratovolcanoes can be found in the area, many of which were affected by explosive eruptions that have destroyed parts of their edifices. Effusion of large amounts of lava took place from several cones. Many volcanoes are extinct and only a few have documented activity. The geologist Juan Brüggen in 1950 estimated that there were about 800 volcanoes in northern Chile, about 37 of them east of the Salar de Atacama. Also part of the volcanism are large ignimbrites, which are usually thought to be of Miocene age. Those in the area of Sairecabur often originated in the neighbourhood to the conical volcanoes. The volcanoes formed over crust with thicknesses reaching 70 km (43 mi), thus the erupted magmas are heavily influenced by the crust. A number of the highest stratovolcanoes in the world are in the CVZ. Historical activity has been low in comparison to the volcanic zones of southern Chile and Colombia/Ecuador. In Chile, much of the area of the CVZ is desert and thus difficult to research.

Sairecabur is constructed on the two Pliocene-Pleistocene Puripicar and Chaxas formations. Some lavas from Sairecabur have also overrun the Purico formation, which is of Pleistocene age and includes ignimbrites from the Purico Complex. The basement beneath Sairecabur and Licancabur contains a large number of faults.

=== Geography ===
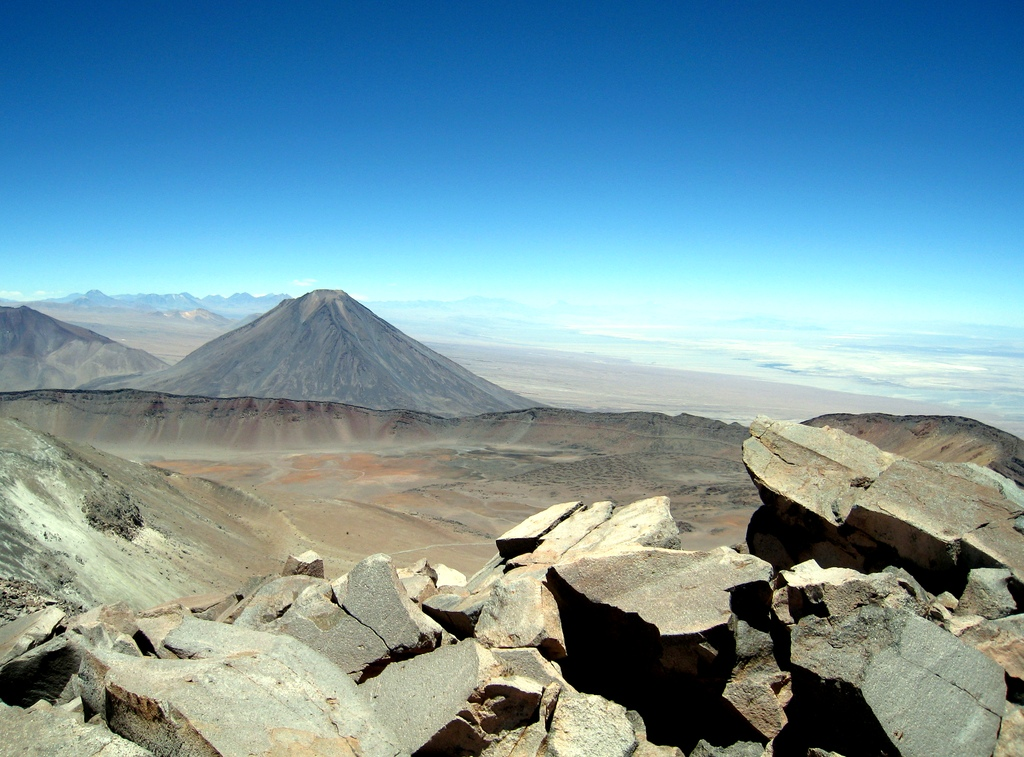
Licancabur seen from Sairecabur

Sairecabur is located at a distance of 25 kilometres (16 mi) from San Pedro de Atacama. The volcano saddles the frontier between Bolivia and Chile, where it lies in the Antofagasta Region. Laguna Verde lake, Licancabur volcano and Portezuelo de Chaxas pass lie south of Sairecabur. East of the Sairecabur range lie Mount Nelly and Cerro Laguna Verde.

The Treaty of Peace and Friendship (1904) traced the frontier between Bolivia and Chile along the Sairecabur chain. Disagreements between the topographic maps in the two countries mean that the naming of the mountains is often confusing. Escalante is also known as Apagado.

The volcano is associated with a mountain range of the same name. The Sairecabur range forms a drainage divide between the Salar de Atacama on the western side and a number of small endorheic basins in Bolivia on the eastern side. Licancabur and Juriques farther south and Tocorpuri farther north are part of the same divide. Dry valleys on the eastern side of the Sairecabur range ultimately drain into Laguna Verde. The Rio Purifica originates on Sairecabur's slope at an altitude of 3,950 metres (12,960 ft), it later converges with the Rio Puritama to form the San Pedro de Atacama River.

=== Geology ===
The Sairecabur range is a 22-kilometre (14 mi) long chain of volcanoes going from Escalante volcano (south of Putana Volcano) to Sairecabur proper in the south, including at least ten centres which have been active in postglacial time. Two additional centres exist northeast of Escalante.

5,971-metre (19,590 ft) (Note: Other data from digital elevation models: SRTM yields 5,958 metres (19,547 ft), ASTER 5,928 metres (19,449 ft), SRTM filled with ASTER5,958 metres (19,547 ft), ALOS 5,928 metres (19,449 ft) and TanDEM-X 6,001 metres (19,688 ft).) (Note: The height of the nearest key col is 4,671 metres (15,325 ft), leading to a topographic prominence of 1,300 metres (4,300 ft) with a topographical dominance of 21.77%. Its parent peak is Acamarachi and the Topographic isolation is 69.6 kilometres (43.2 mi).) high Sairecabur is the highest volcano in the range. A 4.5-kilometre (2.8 mi) wide caldera exists south of Sairecabur and formed on an older volcano. Lava flows extend from Sairecabur as far as 2.5 kilometres (1.6 mi) to the northwest, and further young lava flows formed south of this caldera. The 5,819-metre (19,091 ft) high Escalante (22°36′45″S 67°53′2″W) has a crater lake. Puritama volcano west of Sairecabur has generated 16 kilometres (9.9 mi) lava flows that extend along tectonic canyons. 5,722-metre (18,773 ft) high Curiquinca (22°35′48″S 67°51′30″W) and 5,748-metre (18,858 ft) high Cerro Colorado (22°35′29″S 67°55′18″W) are found northwest and northeast, respectively, of the range.

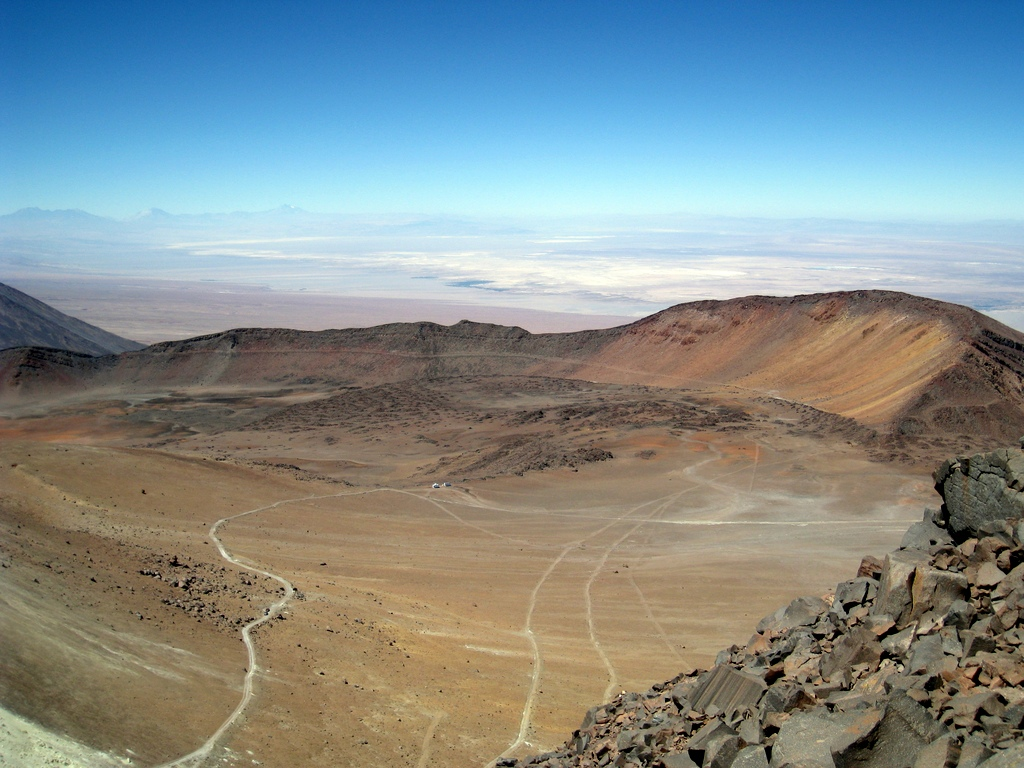
Caldera of Sairecabur

The caldera is bounded by cliffs reaching a height of 400 metres (1,300 ft), which are buried by lava flows from Sairecabur on the northern rim; one of these lava flows reaches the caldera bottom. The pre-collapse volcano was about 7,000 metres (23,000 ft) high and would have been one of the highest volcanoes in the world; Ojos del Salado reaches an altitude of 6,885 metres (22,589 ft). Sairecabur proper has three cones. Thick (10 metres (33 ft)) and short lava flows emanated from the northern cone. Glacial erosion has affected Sairecabur and moraines cover some lava flows south of Sairecabur. The total volume of the Sairecabur proper is about 35 cubic kilometres (8.4 cu mi).

Lava flows with a young appearance extend from each of these ten centres. An older centre has generated a 30 kilometres (19 mi) long lava flow that flowed southwestwards. Some older lava flows from Sairecabur were later buried by lava flows from Licancabur.

Cerro Colorado and Curiquinca are aligned in a west–east pattern. Other volcanoes in the area such as Lascar-Aguas Calientes, Licancabur-Juriques and La Torta-Tocorpuri also form such alignments which seem to be controlled by north–south tension in the crust. Sairecabur is located on faults which are also apparent at Laguna Verde.

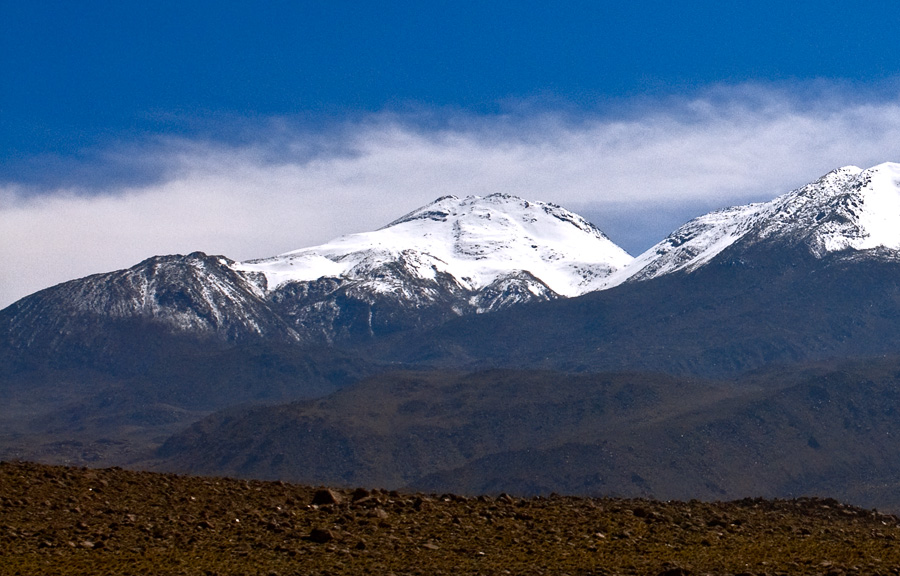
Escalante

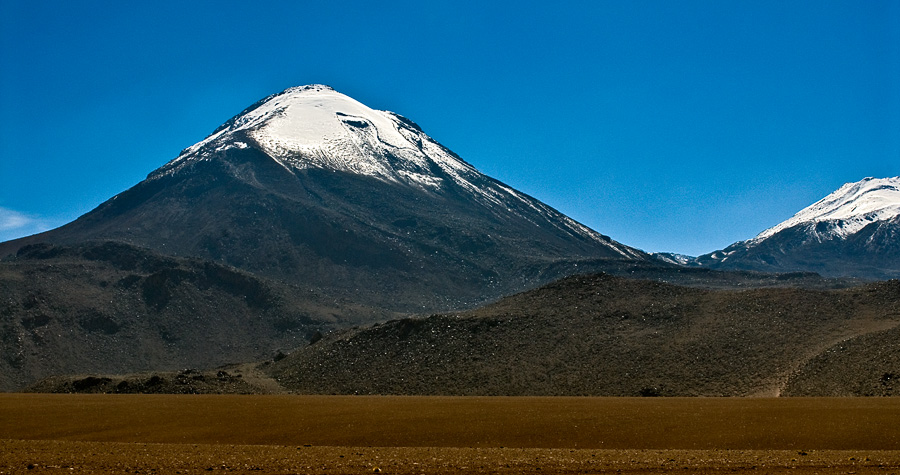
Cerro Colorado

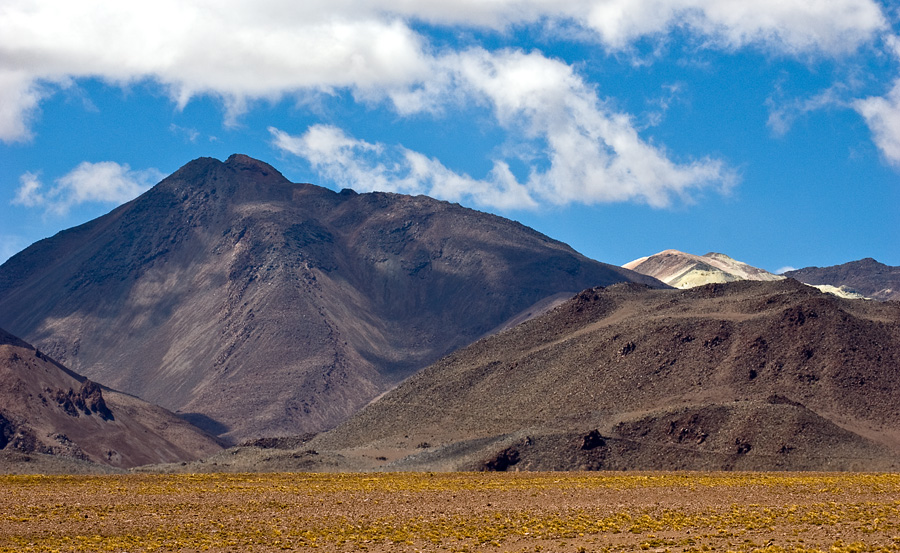
Curiquinca

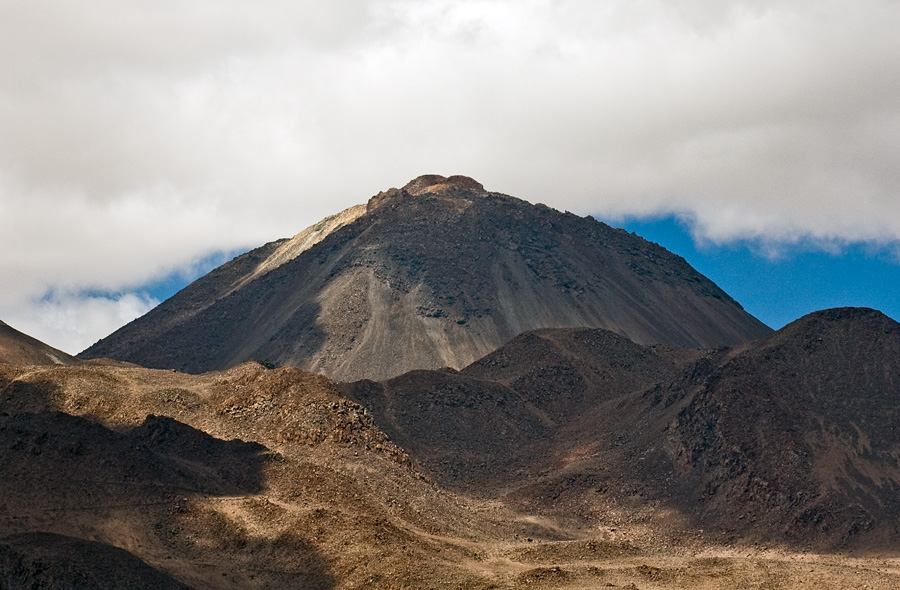
Sairecabur

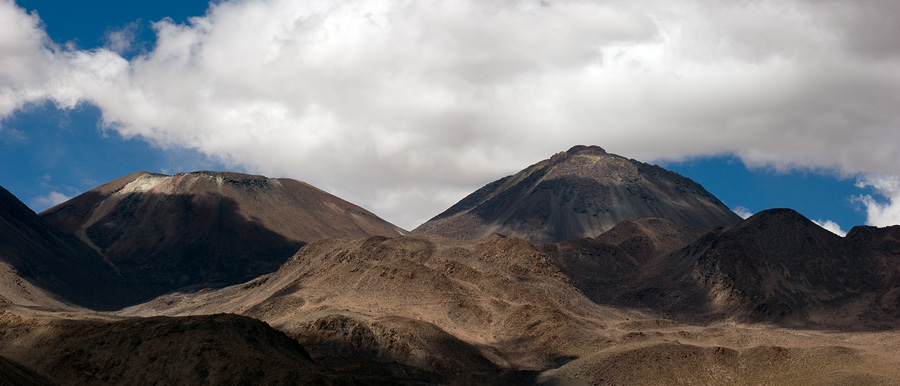
Left Saciel, right Sairecabur

=== Petrology ===
Escalante and Sairecabur have erupted dark andesites, and later also dacites. Mafic enclaves are found in the post-caldera lavas. The colour of the rocks is black, brown or gray. Minerals include amphibole, biotite, bronzite, calcium-containing augite, clinopyroxene, hornblende, magnetite, orthopyroxene, plagioclase, pyroxene and quartz. In addition, apatite, ilmenite, iron oxides and zirconia are found. At least one lava erupted after the caldera-forming eruption contains olivine. Lavas erupted before the caldera-forming eruption of Sairecabur contain glass and have a microlithic texture. The magmas are calc-alkaline with medium-high potassium content.

Fumarolically altered rocks are found on the eastern flanks of the chain. Desert patine covers post-caldera lavas.

Based on crystal composition, the magmas of Sairecabur formed at temperatures of 850–950 °C (1,560–1,740 °F). The process started by partial melting of the mantle involving peridotite and subsequent interaction with the crust and fractional crystallization. Andesites erupted before the caldera formation were produced at temperatures 90 °C (160 °F) higher than dacites erupted after the formation of the caldera. Oxygen, lead and strontium isotope ratios are typical for magmas in CVZ. The Pb isotope ratios are consistent with these found in the crust, specifically of the so-called "Antofalla" domain of Andean crust, the remnant of a terrane of Gondwana.

=== Geological history ===
The 7 million year-old Chaxas ignimbrite massif has been related to the caldera-forming eruption at Sairecabur. These dacitic ignimbrites spread southwest towards the Salar de Atacama. This high age estimate for the Chaxas ignimbrite however has been questioned, considering that it is inconsistent with stratigraphic relationships of this ignimbrite to older ignimbrite. The lava formations are named Post-Caldera Lavas I and Post-Caldera Lavas II; the first is of Pleistocene and the second of Holocene age. A fresh flow that extends northwest from Sairecabur appears to be the most recent flow.

The formation of the caldera occurred before the Holocene and preceded the formation of the other cones in the range. The edifice this caldera formed during the Pliocene-Quaternary considering the morphology of its deposits. During the ice ages, a valley due west of the main Sairecabur summit was occupied by a 8-kilometre (5.0 mi) long glacier that extended down to an elevation of 4,600 metres (15,100 ft); the main Sairecabur summit grew inside of the valley occupied by the glacier, which also left lateral and terminal moraines.

Sairecabur volcano is the youngest volcano in the chain; Escalante is also young but not as young as Sairecabur. There are no reports of contemporaneous activity nor has fumarolic activity been reported, although fumaroles and hot springs were found at the shores of Laguna Verde which border on Sairecabur. Future activity at Sairecabur may disturb activity at Atacama Large Millimeter Array, and will most likely involve the production of lava domes and lava flows with local impacts.

== Climate and biology ==
The climate at Sairecabur is dry and cloudless, leading to the absence of glaciers and permanent snowcover at Sairecabur although a 1985 map shows a persistent ice/snow cover in the summit area and snowfalls can leave temporary snowcover. Overall the Atacama Altiplano has a desert climate with precipitation below 200 millimetres per year (7.9 in/year), but during the late Pleistocene and early Holocene the climate was wetter. Tritium isotope ratios of present-day snowfall are consistent with the isotope ratios determined for precipitation that arises in the continent, rather than from the Pacific Ocean. The rainshadow effect exercised by the Andes and the stability of the South Pacific High are responsible for this dryness.

The dry and cloudless climate together with the low latitude and high altitude gives the region some of the highest insolations on Earth; at Sairecabur it amounts to 98% of the solar constant. The coincidence between the southern hemisphere summer solstice on 21 December and the perihelion, the point of lowest Earth-Sun distance, on 3 January contribute to the high insolation. Ultraviolet radiation is also high in the area, with values 15.6–36.4 watts per square metre (0.00194–0.00453 hp/sq ft) reported for ultraviolet radiation B and ultraviolet radiation A respectively.

Temperatures at 5,820 metres (19,090 ft) ranged from −8.7 to −16.3 °C (16.3 to 2.7 °F) in 1991–1994. A series of measurements in 1995 indicated that surface temperatures at an altitude of 5,820 metres (19,090 ft) range from −20 to 20 °C (−4 to 68 °F) in winter, and soil temperatures at depths of 5 centimetres (2.0 in) also in winter between almost 10 °C (50 °F) and less than −10 °C (14 °F). There are large differences between daytime and night temperatures. Between 1991 and 1994 the average speed of wind amounted to 5–11 metres per second (16–36 ft/s).

Research on plant diversity in the region west of Sairecabur and Licancabur has shown that about 250 plant species occur there, and on the volcano itself extremophilic yeast species have been found. In 1955, penitentes, a form of ice, was reported to be widespread at Saciel.

== Human history ==
=== Pre-modern times ===
The name of the mountain means "rain mountain" in the Kunza language, from Saire "rain" and cabur or caur "mountain". Sairecabur and Curiquinca both have mountain sanctuaries made by the Inca. Licancabur and Juriques farther south were also sites of such sanctuaries. Sairecabur was considered to be a sacred mountain, and andesite found at some archeological sites in the Atacama may come from Sairecabur.

=== Recent times ===
A sulfur mine is active at Saciel, north of Sairecabur, and there were sulfur mines and associated infrastructure like relay stations at Sairecabur. Sulfur mining there, at Cerro Colorado and Putana in the 1950s contributed to the growth of San Pedro de Atacama, where the mined sulfur was transported to. A report in 1955 indicated the presence of about 600,000 tonnes (590,000 long tons; 660,000 short tons) ore containing 55–60% sulfur. A 21-kilometre (13 mi) long mining dirt road with a single lane leads from the El Tatio highway to Sairecabur.

Sairecabur is since 2003 the site of the 0.8-metre (2 ft 7 in) diameter Receiver Lab Telescope, a telescope which operates in the terahertz range of the electromagnetic spectrum; ground-based astronomy in this range was long considered to be impossible since the atmosphere absorbs radiation in that frequency range heavily. With an altitude of 5,525 metres (18,127 ft) the telescope is the highest submillimeter telescope in the world.

== Gallery ==
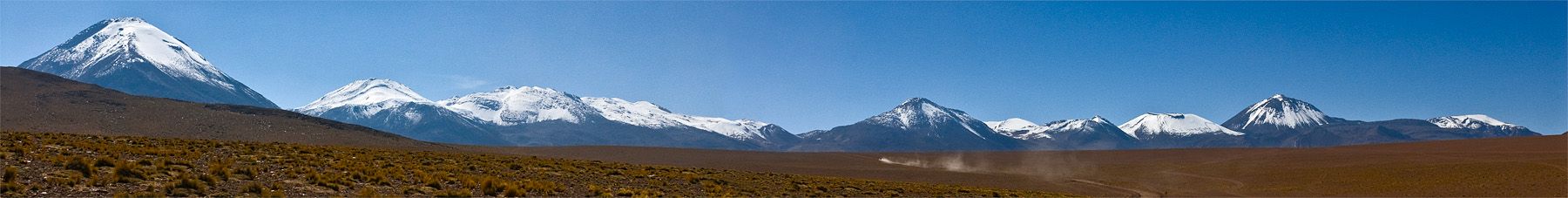
The Sairecabur range. From right to the left, Cerro Colorado, Escalante, Ojos del Toro, Saciel and Sairecabur.

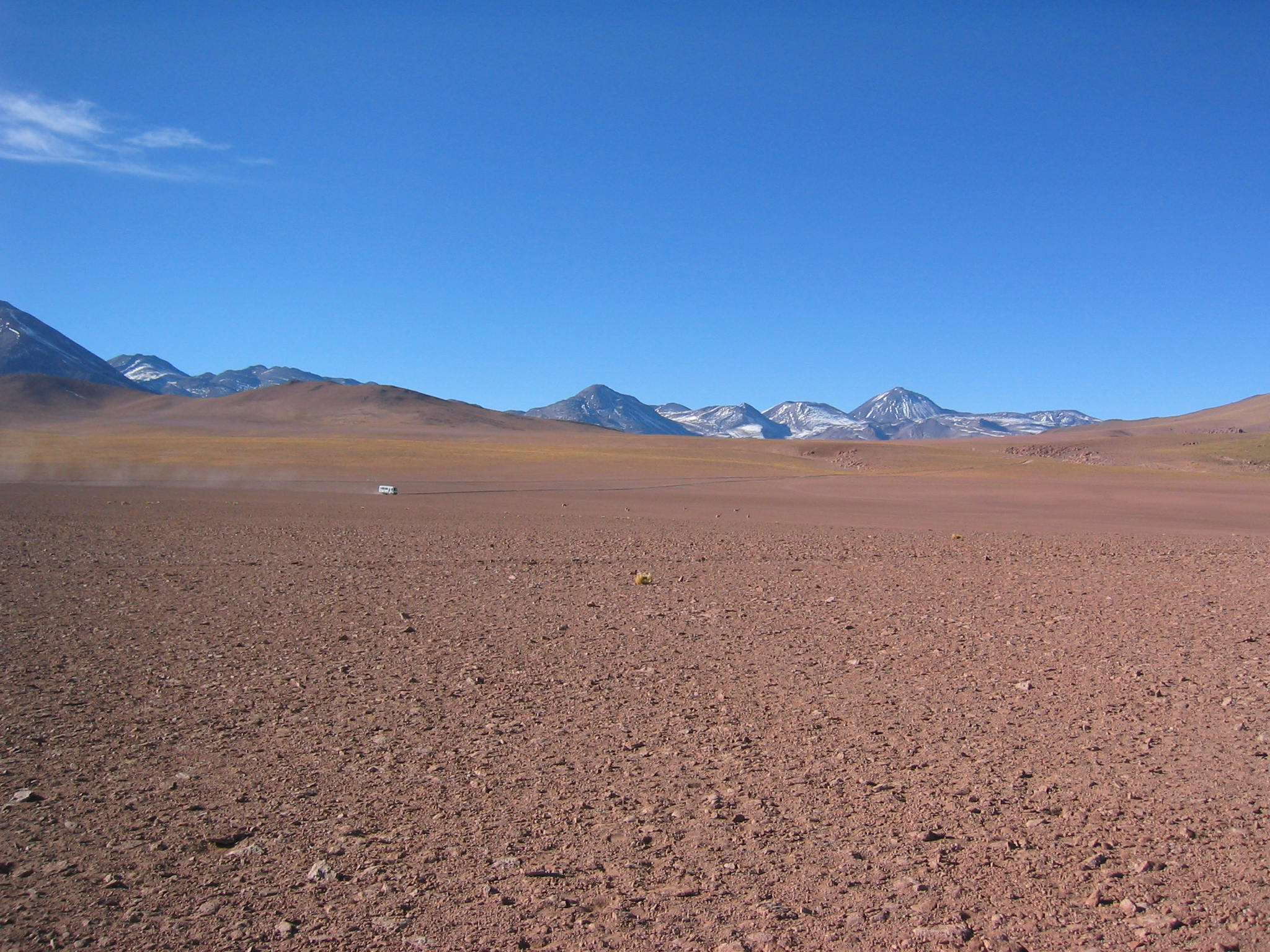
Sairecabur range

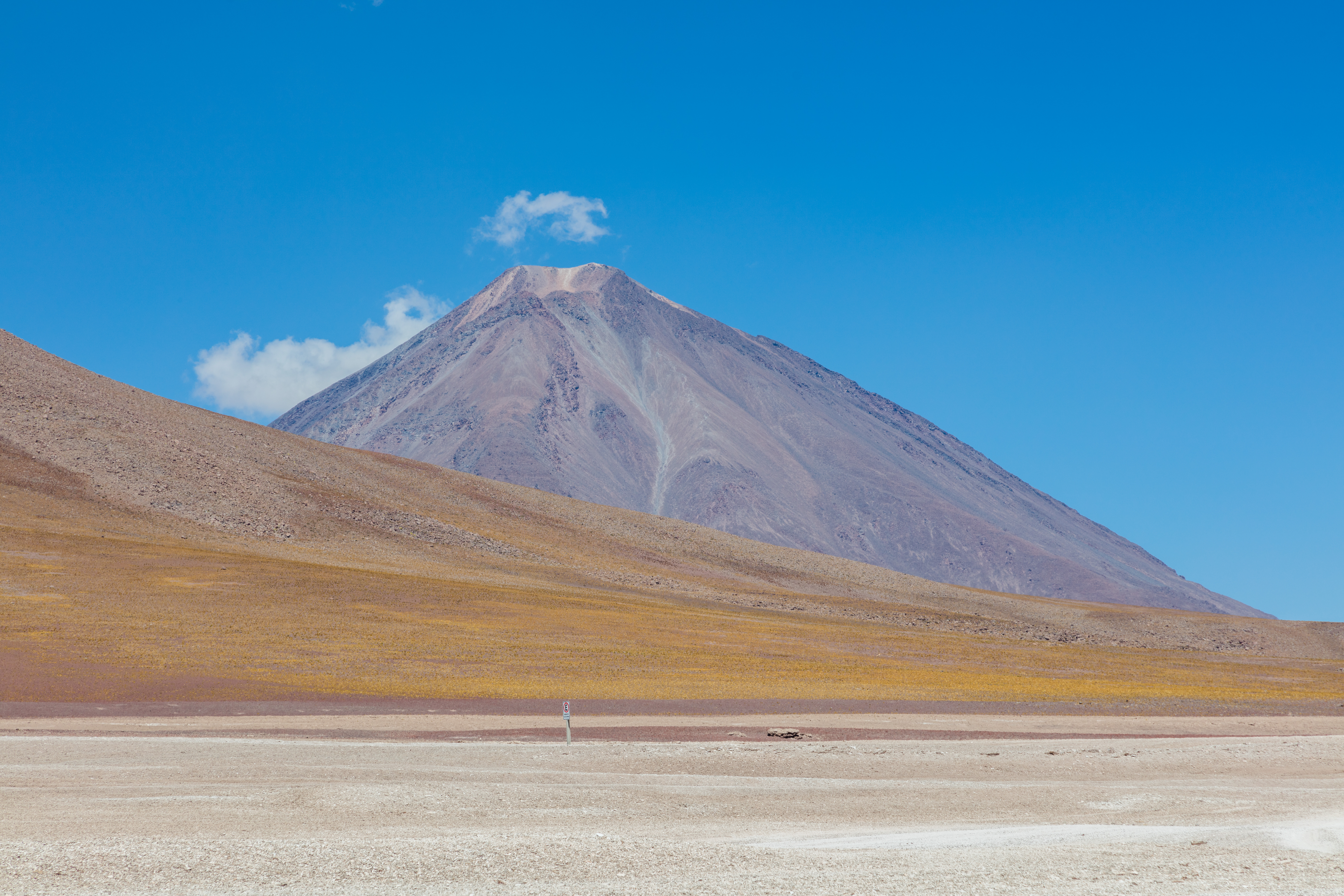
Sairecabur proper
