= Salvador Dalí Desert =

Desert in Bolivia

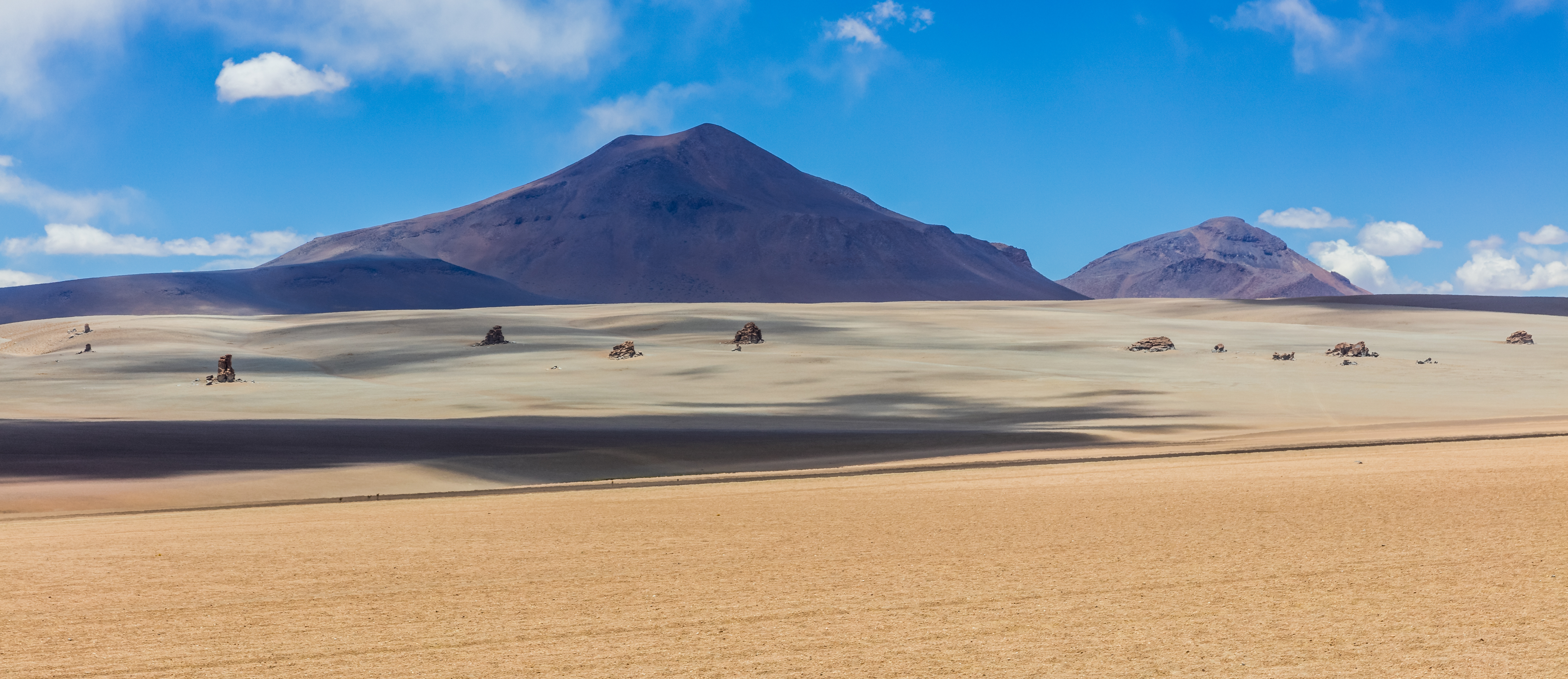
- Floor elevation: 4,750 m (15,580 ft)
- Area: 110 km^{2} (42 mi^{2})

Naming
- Native name: Desierto Salvador Dalí (Spanish)

Geology
- Type: Puna grassland, Desert

Geography
- Country: Bolivia
- Department: Potosí Department; Sur Lípez Province
- Coordinates: 22°36′54″S 67°39′49″W
- Interactive map of Salvador Dalí Desert

Salvador Dalí Desert (Spanish: Desierto Salvador Dalí), also known as Dalí Valley (Valle de Dalí), is a desert within the borders of the Eduardo Avaroa Andean Fauna National Reserve, located in the southwestern region of the Potosí Department in Bolivia. It has an average altitude of 4,750 meters above sea level and an area of approximately 110 km² (42 sq mi).

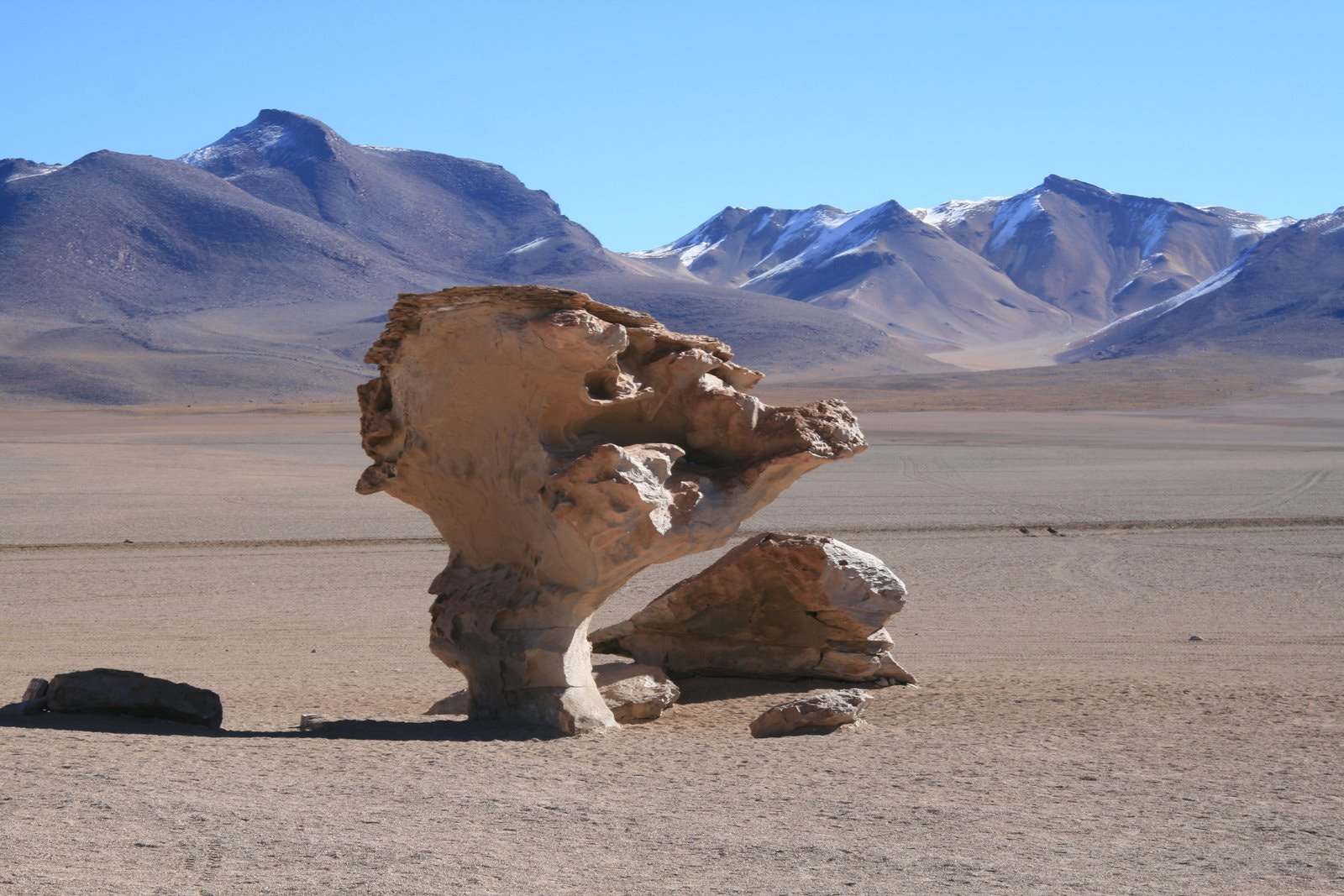
The rear face of the Árbol de Piedra, a tree-like volcanic rock carved by wind erosion standing in contrast with the barren landscape of the desert

The desert is situated in an extremely barren valley and stands out for its unique landscape in which many isolated rock formations created by wind erosion alternate along the arid and desolate plain, giving the landscape a unique character that closely resemble the surrealist paintings by Salvador Dalí. The geothermal and volcanic activity in the area, the salt flats, lagoons, hot springs, and rock formations of various mineral soils all contribute to the unique landscape and color palette of the desert, recreating abstract shapes and a surreal aspect, similar to the paintings of the famous Catalan artist, whom the desert is named for. Among the isolated rock formations in the desert, the most prominent one is the Árbol de Piedra (Spanish for Stone Tree). It is a 7-meter-high volcanic rock carved through wind erosion carrying sand for centuries, giving it a tree-like appearance with a narrow stem and a wide crown at the top. It is the most visited natural object in the desert and is widely photographed.
