= Suri Phuyu =

Mountain in Bolivia

- Location within Bolivia

Highest point
- Elevation: 5,458 m (17,907 ft)
- Coordinates: 22°23′09″S 67°29′26″W

Geography
- Location: Bolivia, Potosí Department, Sur Lípez Province
- Parent range: Andes, Cordillera Occidental

Suri Phuyu (Aymara suri rhea, phuyu feather, "rhea feather", also spelled Suriphuyo) is a 5,458-metre-high (17,907 ft) mountain in the Cordillera Occidental range of the Bolivian Andes. It is located in the Potosí Department, Sur Lípez Province, San Pablo de Lípez Municipality. Suri Phuyu lies within the borders of the Eduardo Avaroa Andean Fauna National Reserve. It is situated southwest of the Uturunku volcano at the Challwiri salt flat, northeast of it.
