= Arkenu structures =

Pair of geological features in Libya

Coordinates: 22°6′5″N 23°47′54″E

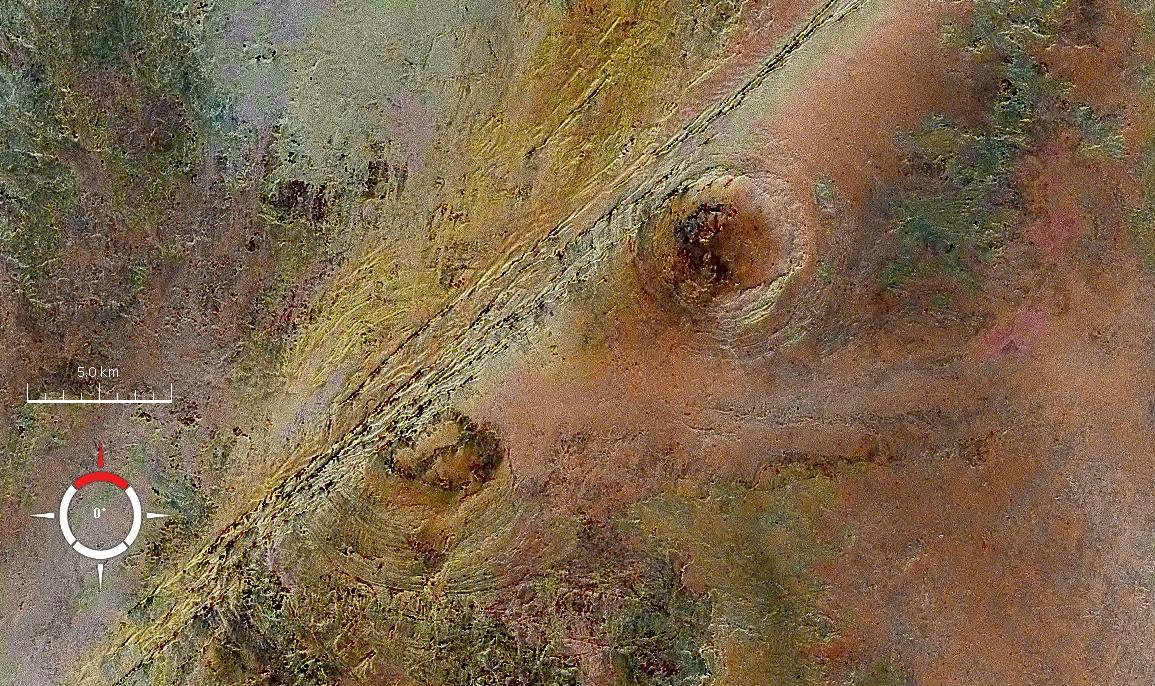
- Landsat image of the Arkenu structures; screen capture from NASA World Wind
- Location: Jabal Arkanu, Libya

Impact crater structure
- Diameter: 10 kilometres (6.2 mi) and 6.8 kilometres (4.2 mi)
- Age: <120 Ma
- Exposed: Yes
- Drilled: No

The Arkenu structures, also known as the Arkenu craters, are a pair of prominent circular geological structures in eastern Libya. The structures are approximately 10 kilometres (6.2 mi) and 6.8 kilometres (4.2 mi) in diameter, and lie about 70 kilometres (43 mi) west of Jabal Arkanu on the eastern margin of the al-Kufrah Basin.

It has been argued that both structures were formed by simultaneous meteorite impacts. Field investigations by Dr. P. Paillou, Dr. A. Rosenqvist, and others reported the presence of impact breccias at the structures' bottoms, shatter cones pointing toward the center of the structures, and microscopic planar deformation features found in quartz grains of sandstones outcropping in the structures. Based on these reports and other observations, it was proposed that both structures are extraterrestrial impact craters that were formed simultaneously as a double impact event less than 140 million years ago (Jurassic or younger).

More recently, on the basis of field, petrographic, and textural observations, it has been argued that the Arkenu structures are not in fact extraterrestrial impact craters. Field studies found a lack of identifiable shatter cones at both structures. Instead, the striations which were previously reported as shatter cones were identified as ventifacts created by wind erosion in sandstones. These striations are surficial features that are unrelated to fracturing of the sandstone, are consistently oriented with the prevailing Holocene wind patterns, and occur within and outside of, even distal to, both of the Arkenu structures. In addition, detailed petrographic analyses of rock samples from both of the Arkenu structures found a lack of any microscopic effect of shock metamorphism including a lack of planar deformation features in quartz grains and evidence of impact melting, or presence of glass. A lack of any apparent differences between the sedimentary rocks outcropping inside and outside these circular structures was found. Finally, field observations found silicified sandstone dikes and igneous rocks, such as syenite, porphyries, tephrites, phonolites, and lamprophyres (monchiquites) directly associated with each circular feature. Based on these and other observations, it was concluded that the Arkenu structures are stocks of porphyritic syenitic that have intruded the Nubia Formation to form rather simple and eroded ring dike complexes. Hydrothermal activity that followed the intrusion of these ring dike complexes resulted in the formation of massive magnetite–hematite deposits and dikes of silicified sandstone. As a result of this research, the Arkenu structures were removed from and are currently not listed in the Earth Impact Database.
