= Cerro Colorado (volcano) =

Mountain in Chile

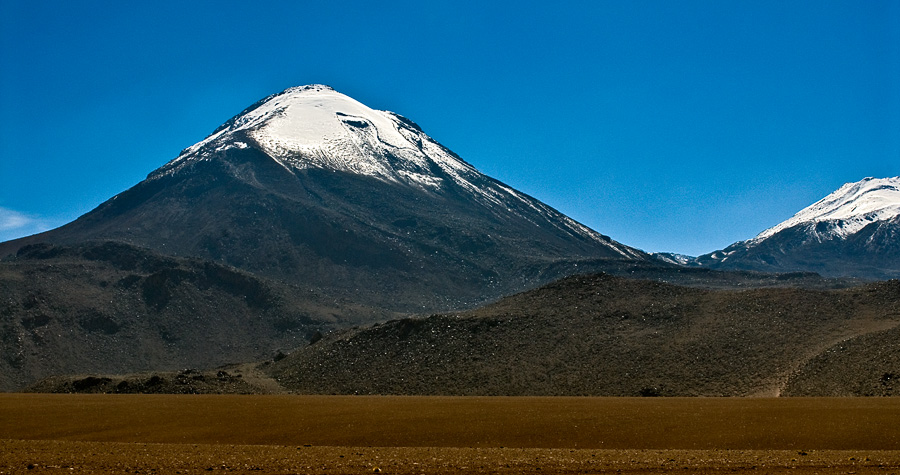
- The Cerro Colorado volcano, seen from the west. The right, part of volcán Escalante (El Apagado)

Highest point
- Elevation: 5,748 m (18,858 ft)
- Coordinates: 22°35.54′S 67°55.33′W

Geography
- Location: Chile
- Parent range: Andes

Geology
- Mountain type: Stratovolcano

Cerro Colorado is a stratovolcano that lies in northern Chile about 7 km (4 mi) west of the border with Bolivia and approximately the same distance southwest of the Putana Volcano. Cerro Colorado is located immediately west of Cerro Curiquinca and northwest of volcán Escalante (El Apagado); all three mountains are considered to be part of the Sairecabur volcanic group.

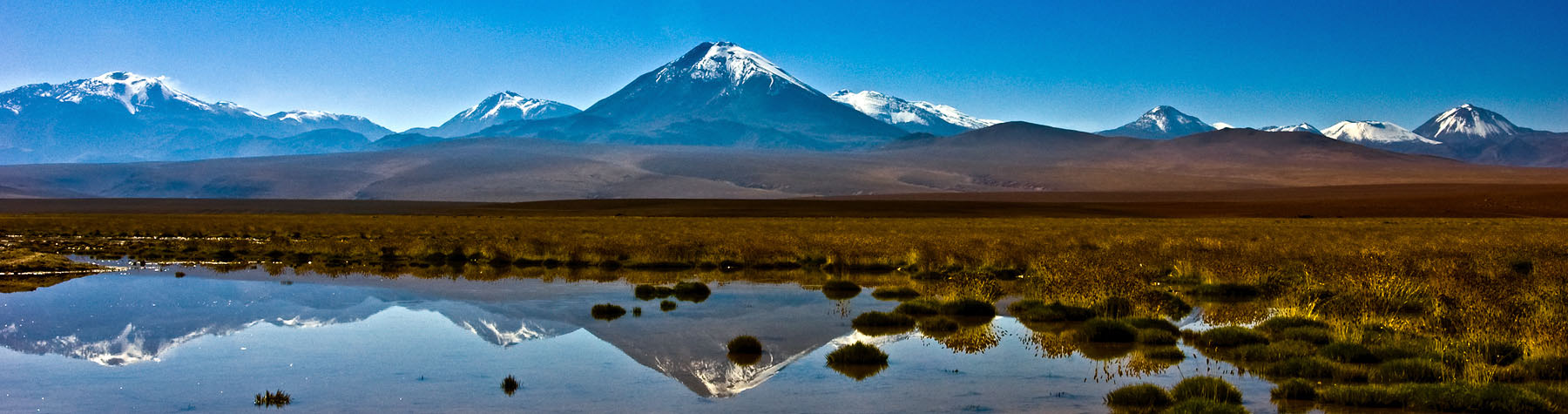
Seen from the Vado de Putana "bofedal", FLTR: Volcán Putana, Volcán Curiquinca, Cerro Colorado, Volcán Escalante (El Apagado), Cerro Ojos del Toro, Cerro Saciel and Volcán Sairécabur. Camera location: 22°35′30.31″S 68°0′19.89″W. heading: 115°

== See also ==
- List of volcanoes in Bolivia
- List of volcanoes in Chile
