= Ventifact =

Rock that has been eroded by wind-driven sand or ice crystals

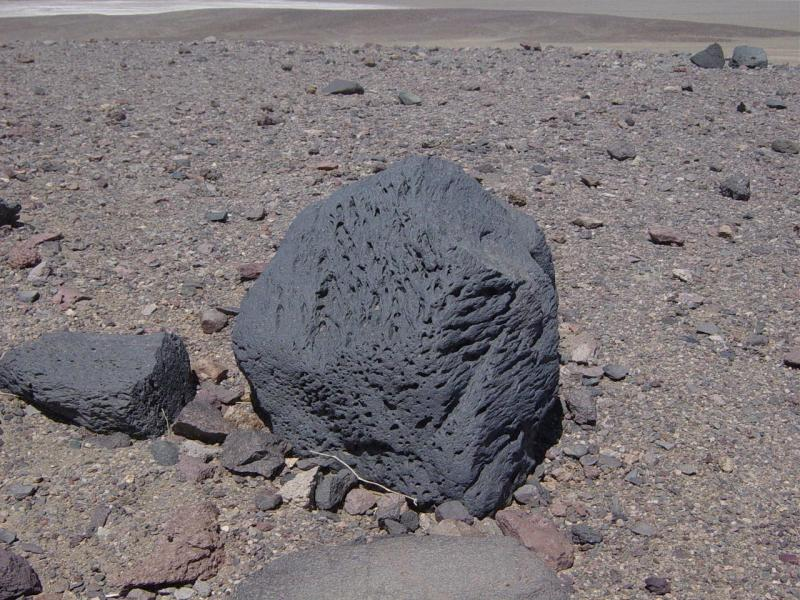
Ventifact in Death Valley.

A ventifact (also wind-faceted stone, windkanter) is a rock that has been abraded, pitted, etched, grooved, or polished by wind-driven sand or ice crystals. The word "Ventifact" is derived from the Latin word "Ventus" meaning 'wind'. These geomorphic features are most typically found in arid environments where there is little vegetation to interfere with aeolian particle transport, where there are frequently strong winds, and where there is a steady but not overwhelming supply of sand.

Ventifacts are formed by a variety of factors, including the type of original rock, wind speed and direction, size of aeolian particles, landscape variations, and the duration of this process, which is typically many years. They can be found in arid, coastal, and periglacial regions. Studying ventifacts can lead to historical observations regarding landscape formation. Scientists use ventifacts to describe both erosion processes and dominant wind patterns, which are used for both historical and future purposes. Many ventifacts on Earth are also influenced by the effects of water, which leads to studies on the planet Mars, where water is almost nonexistent.

== Types ==
Various types of features can be attributed to ventifacts, including flutes, pits, and grooves. Flutes are etched divots in the face of the rock; pits are rounded portions of the rock that have been removed; grooves are smooth, meandering carvings. These formations are caused as sand particles blown onto rocks slowly etch away at weak points in the structure. When ancient ventifacts are preserved without being moved or disturbed, they may serve as paleo-wind indicators. The wind direction at the time the ventifact formed will be parallel to grooves or striations cut into the rock.

Common ventifact types include:

- Einkanters have one polished side (excluding the bottom part) (the German word 'ein' means 'one')
- Zweikanters have two polished sides (excluding the bottom part) (the German word 'zwei' means 'two')
- Dreikanters have three polished surface (excluding the polished surface at bottom) that meet up at sharp angles (the German word 'drei' means 'three')

== Abrasion ==
Ventifacts commonly form in arid, coastal, and periglacial regions where there are both wind and sand particles. Arid deserts that provide abundant sand and a scarce water supply allow loose, dry sand to be transported by suspension or saltation, abrading rocks upon contact. The lack of vegetation on coasts and periglacial environments coupled with high wind speeds and particle transport lends to ventifact creation also.

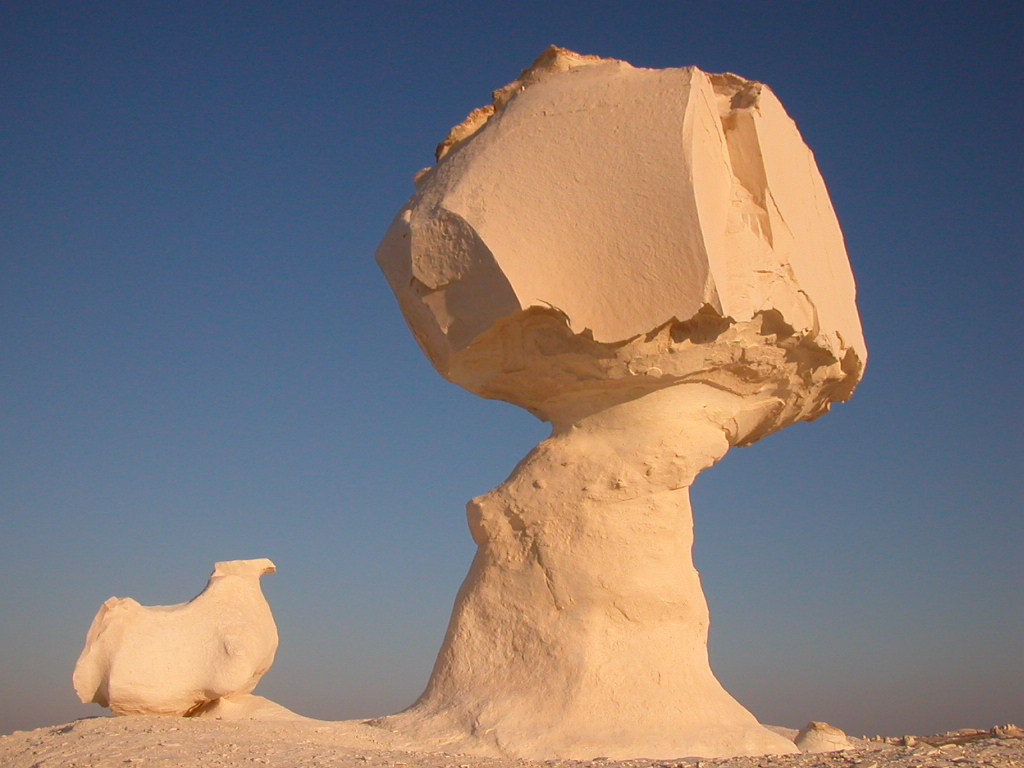
Wind-carved "mushroom" shaped rocks are the centerpiece of White Desert National Park, Egypt

White Desert National Park near Farafra Oasis in Egypt experiences significant ventifact formation. Moderately tall, isolated rock outcrops ornament the landscape, eroded by saltation into mushroom-shaped rock sculptures. Saltation occurs when wind-blown particles bounce along the ground, chipping away at a rock when the particles reach it. Over time, the bouncing sand grains erode the lower portions of a ventifact, leaving a larger, less-eroded cap. In certain regions, the lower rock consists of a softer makeup capped with a more wind-resistant rock on top. The sand's highly abrasive qualities due to the particles's relatively large size lend to these configurations. The resulting products thus frequently resemble fantastical stone mushrooms.

== Studying ventifacts ==
=== Ventifacts on Mars ===
Ventifacts have also been discovered on Mars, where wind primarily characterizes surface distinctions due to the dry climate. The lack of moisture on the planet allows for studies observing the sole effects of wind and particles in the formation of ventifacts. During an exploration, the Curiosity rover was reported to have experienced significant damage to its wheels due to sharp immobile rocks, or ventifacts. Other rovers, including "Mars Exploration Rover," and "Spirit," have also traversed the planet's landscape, locating ventifacts and other landforms. A specific ventifact named Jake Matijevic has been used as a reference point for mapping Martian terrain and measuring weathering effects.

=== Wind tunnel experiments ===
Ventifacts have been studied through the execution of wind tunnel experiments. Wind tunnels operate as artificial environments with variables that can be controlled and measured. The Trent Environmental Wind Tunnel is based on Ralph Bagnold's previous experiments with wind tunnels. Ralph Bagnold (1896-1990) was a British geologist who pioneered studies on aeolian processes through wind tunnel experiments. He crossed the Libyan Desert during his service in the British Army, eventually publishing a book based on his studies of the effects of the wind and sand.

NASA's Titan Wind Tunnel is used to test aeolian processes on various planets. The wind tunnel consists of multiple closely measured chambers, with controlled variables including pressure, wind, and gas composition. This allows for realistic representations of the varying planetary atmospheres. Specific observations about the ventifact formation can be gathered from the data, such as the saltation threshold, when wind begins to move particles, and impact threshold.

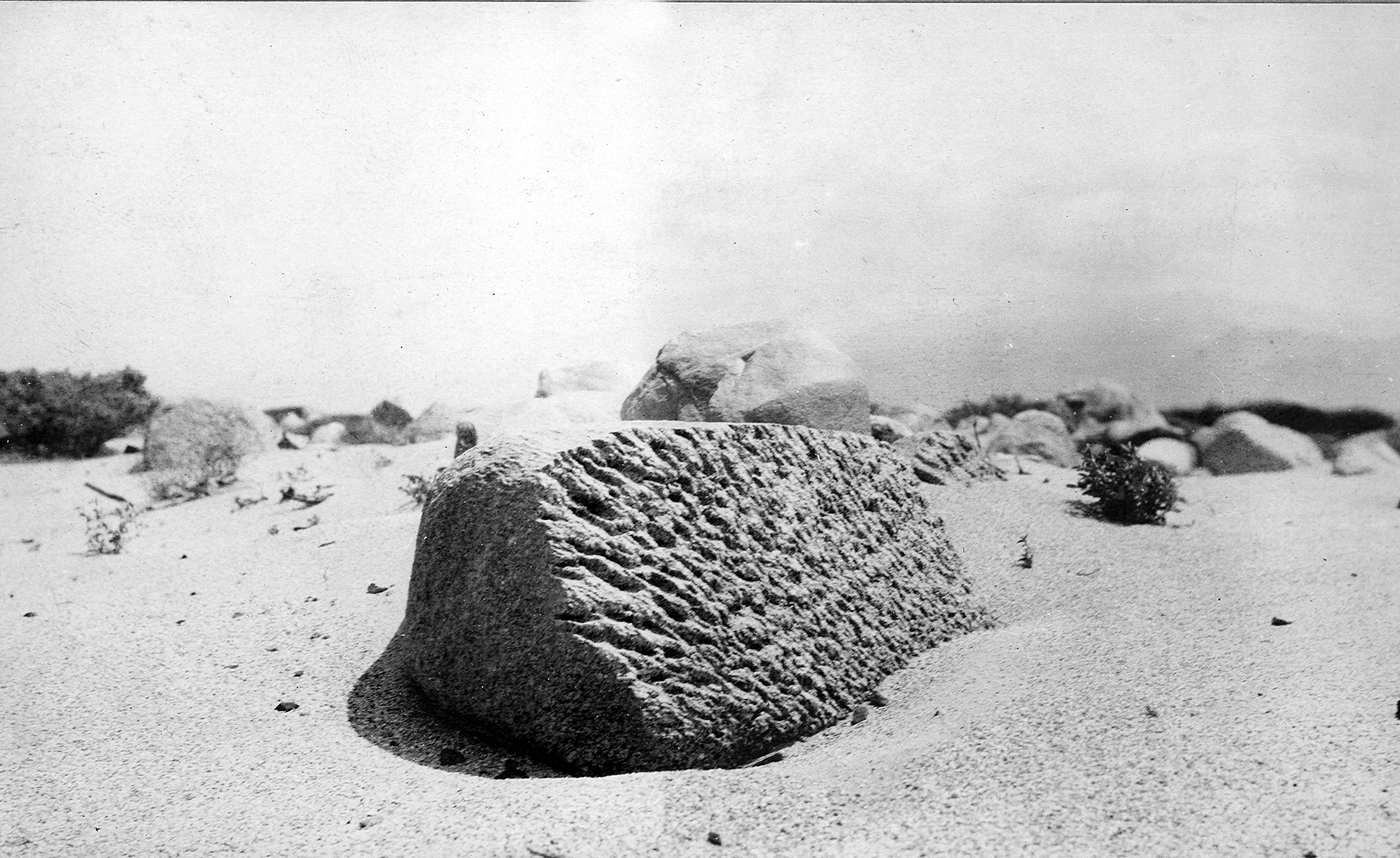
Schist boulder pitted by sand blast near Palm Springs Station, Colorado Desert. Riverside County, California (Mendenhall, 1905)

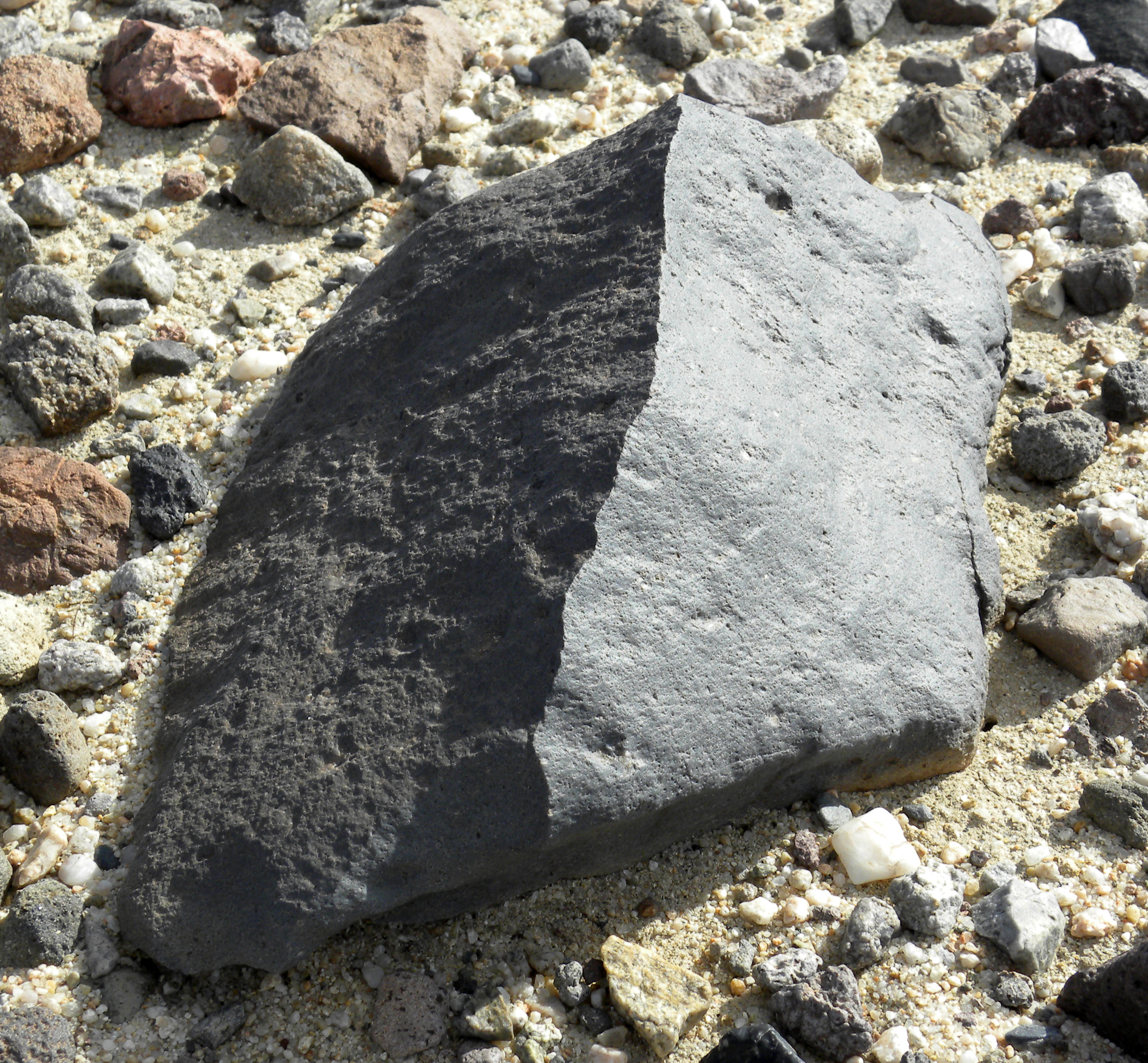
Ventifact from the Mojave Desert near Barstow, California.

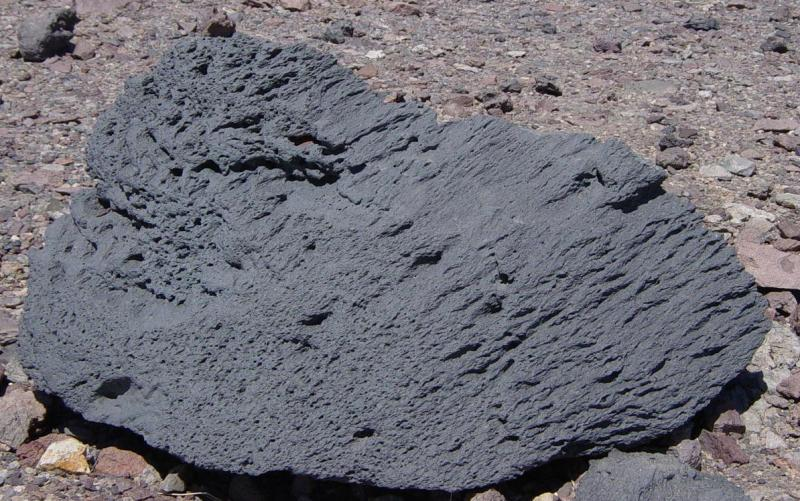
Ventifact at Ventifact Ridge in Death Valley (Mayer, 2003)

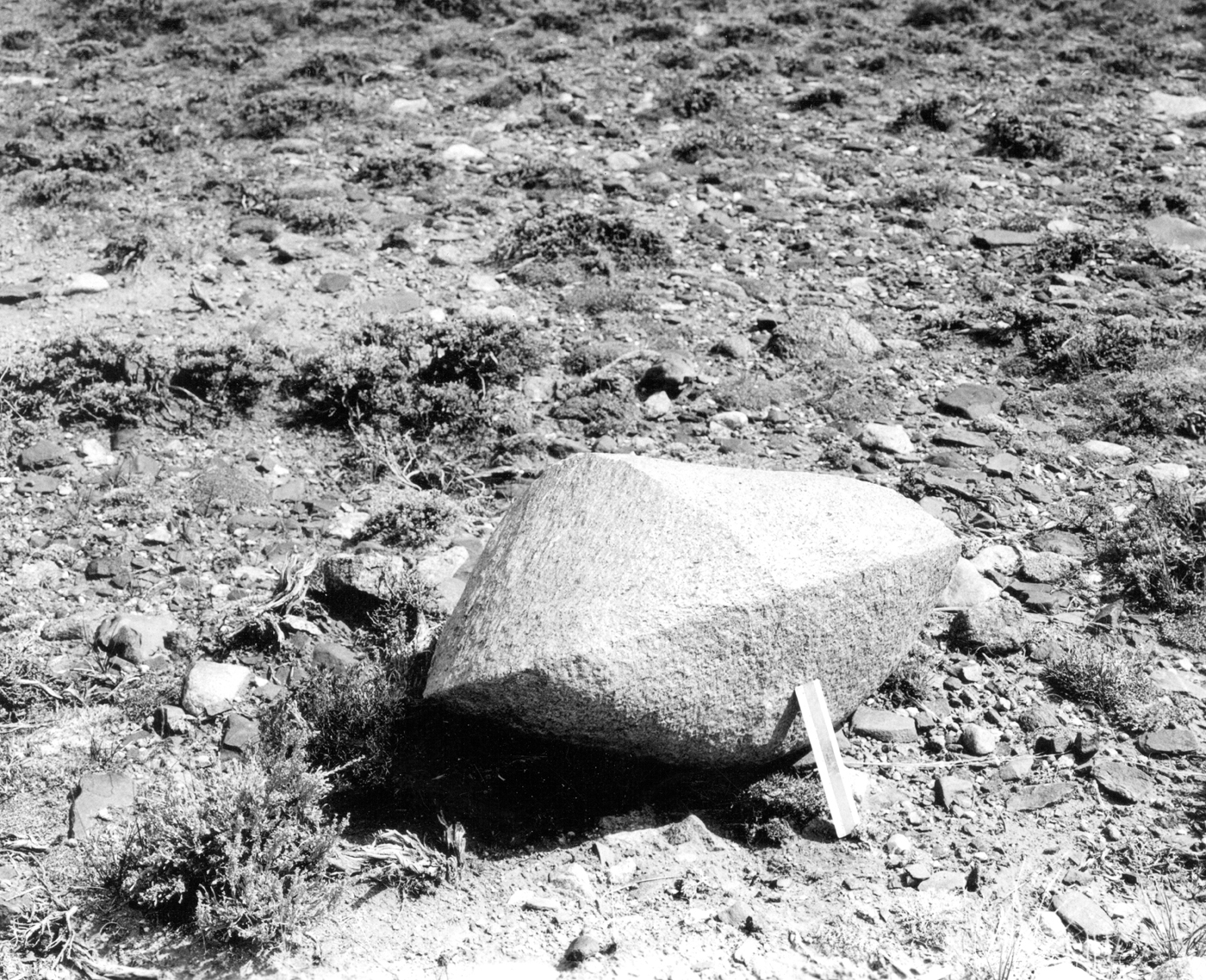
Granite dreikanter polished by windblown sand, Sweetwater County, Wyoming (Bradley, 1930)

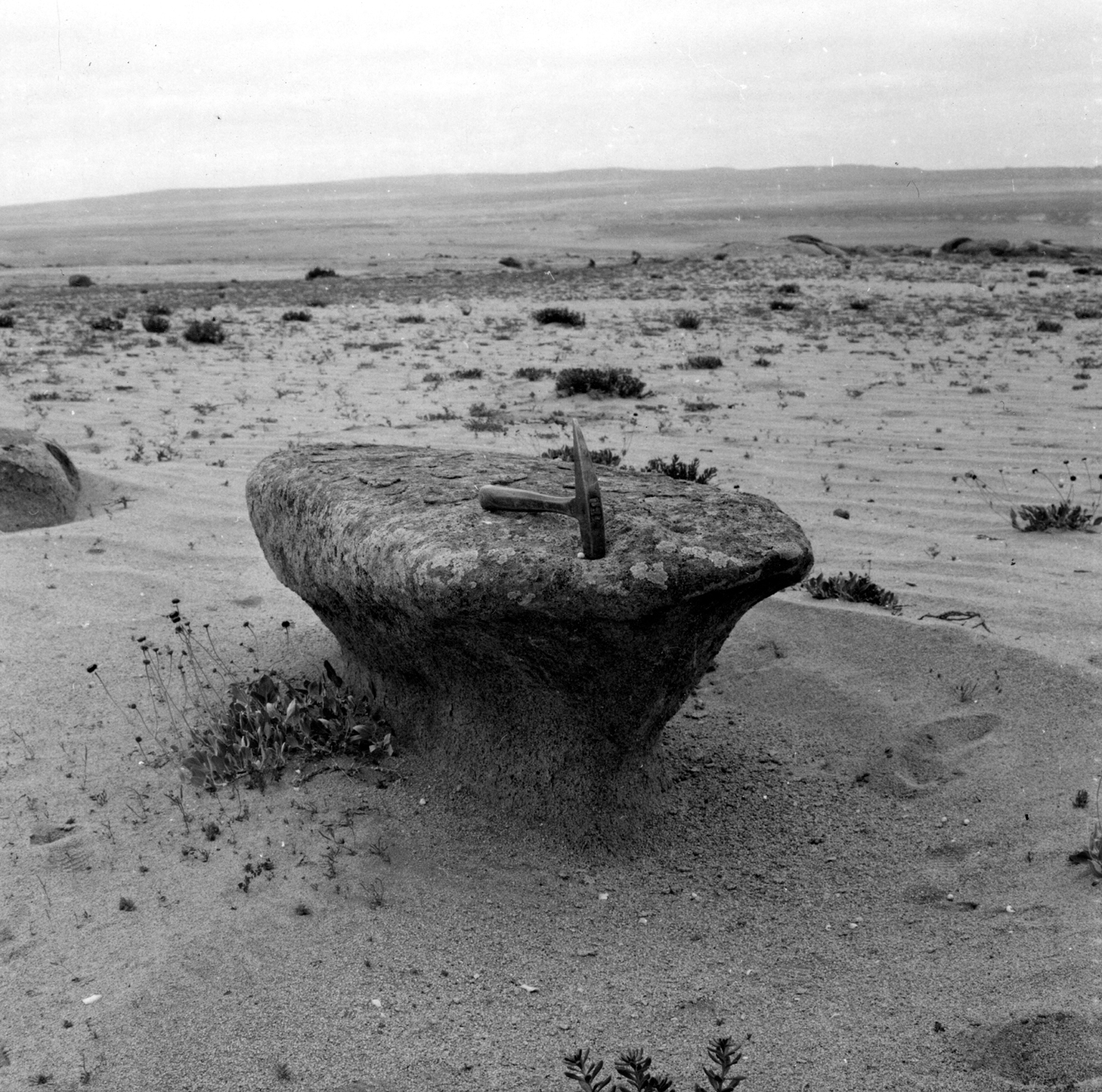
Outcrop of granite that has been undercut by the abrasive action of windblown sand, Llano de Caldera, Atacama Province, Chile (Segerstrom, 1962)

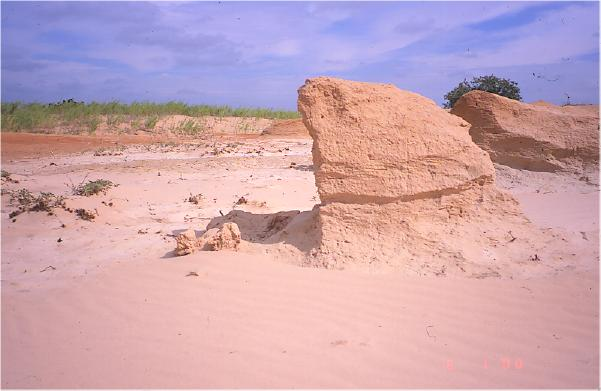
Wind-carved, sandstone yardang in a blowout near Meadow, Texas (Stout, 2002)

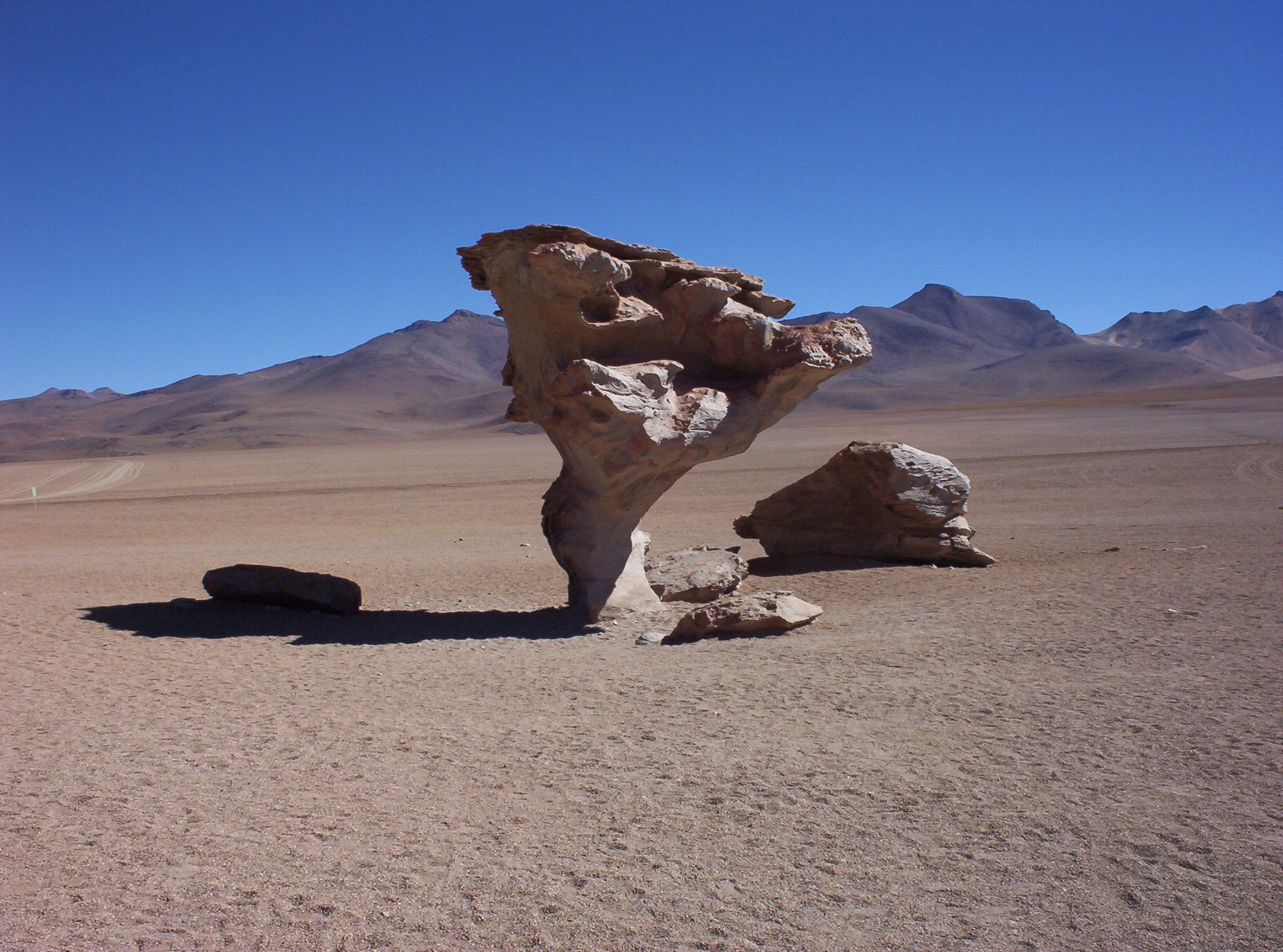
The Árbol de Piedra is a 7-metre-tall ventifact in the Altiplano region of Bolivia (Wilken, 2002).

== See also ==
- Arkenu structures – Pair of geological features in Libya
- Blowout (geomorphology) – Depressions in a sand dune ecosystem caused by the removal of sediments by wind
- Dune – Hill of loose sand built by aeolian processes or the flow of water
- Yardang – Streamlined aeolian landform
- Ventifact Knobs – Geographic feature in Antarctica, Antarctica
