= List of highest features on Earth =

This is a list of the highest feature on Earth for each category.

Category	Highest feature	Altitude (MASL)	Photo	Notes	References
Point	Mount Everest, China/Nepal	8,850	Everest's north face from the Tibetan plateau	The altitude officially recognized for both China and Nepal is the former figure of 8,848 57°18′22″N 4°27′32″W	
Glacier	Khumbu, Nepal	8,000	Khumbu Glacier	It begins on the west side of Lhotse at an elevation of 7,600 m (24,934 ft) to 8,000 m (26,247 ft)	.
Volcano	Ojos del Salado, Argentina/Chile	6,893	Ojos del Salado looming on the horizon		
Archeological site	Summit of Llullaillaco volcano, Argentina/Chile (Inca burial)	6,739	Johan Reinhard, discoverer of the site, at the summit of Volcán Llullaillaco, 1999		
Motorable attainable place	Slope of Ojos del Salado volcano, Chile	6,688			
Helipad	Sonam, Siachen Glacier, India	6,400	Satellite imagery of the Siachen Glacier		
Lake/Lagoon	Lagoon at eastern side of Ojos del Salado, Chile	6,390		27°06′49″S 68°31′35″W	
Road (dead end)	Aucanquilcha, Chile	6,176	A sulfur mine on Aucanquilcha	Mining road to summit of volcano, once usable by 20-ton mining trucks. The road is no longer usable.	
Continuously inhabited place (ever)	Aucanquilcha, Chile	5,950		Miners slept lower, at Quilcha (5,334m)	
Habitable cabin	High Andes Rescue Unit, Ojos del Salado, Chile	6,100			
Astronomical observatory	University of Tokyo Atacama Observatory (TAO), Chile	5,640	Looking east towards Cerro Chajnantor, site of TAO	22°59′12″S 67°44′32″W	
Road (mountain pass)	Mana Pass, India/China	5,610	Mana Village, Badrinath, Uttarakhand, India		
Ski lift (ever)	Chacaltaya, Bolivia	5,422	Enhanced image of Chacaltaya ski resort, November 2007	The ski ended when the glacier disappeared, in 2009	
City	La Rinconada, Peru	5,100	La Rinconada, Peru	Over 7,000 inhabitants, associated with a gold mine	
Railway	Xining-Golmud-Lhasa at Tanggula, China	5,068	Tanggula railway station building		
Road (asphalted)	Ticlio, Peru	4,818	A signboard near the station of Ticlio. The green sign says, in Spanish: "TICLIO - TOURISTIC PLACE / 4818 amsl / World's highest railroad crossing", although it has been surpassed since		
Ski lift (current)	Lijiang/Jade Dragon Snow Mountain, China	4,700			
Commercial airport	Daocheng Yading Airport, Sichuan, China	4,411		The proposed Nagqu Dagring Airport in Tibet, 4,436 m (14,554 ft), if built, will be higher.	
Golf course	Yak golf course, Sikkim, India	3,970			
National capital, de facto	La Paz, Bolivia	3,650	La Paz, Bolivia	Average elevation at the city centre. Bolivia is a country with multiple capitals - Sucre (constitutional capital) and La Paz (seat of government).	
National capital, official	Quito, Ecuador	2,850	View of Quito from the International Space Station		
Point accessible by an oceangoing vessel (ever)	Whitehorse, Yukon Territory	640	Downtown Whitehorse and Yukon River, June 2008		
Point accessible by an oceangoing vessel (current)	Rhine–Main–Danube Canal, between Hilpoltstein and Bachhausen, Germany	406	Profile of the canal showing the locks		
