= Curiquinca =

Mountain in Chile

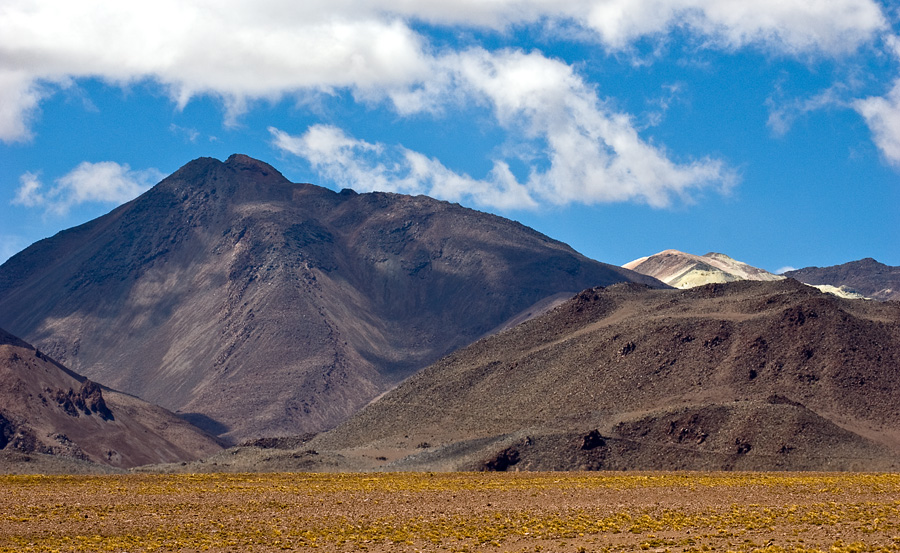
- Curiquinca as seen from the NNW.

Highest point
- Elevation: 5,722 m (18,773 ft)
- Coordinates: 22°35.834′S 67°51.680′W

Geography
- Location: Chile
- Parent range: Andes

Geology
- Mountain type: Stratovolcano

Curiquinca (Spanish pronunciation: [kuɾiˈkiŋka]) is a stratovolcano that straddles the border between Bolivia and Chile. It lies immediately E of Cerro Colorado and NE to volcán Escalante (El Apagado), all of which are considered to be part of the Sairecabur volcanic group. The light area behind the mountain is part of a large sulfur deposit, location of the - now abandoned - sulfur mines "Azufrera El Apagado" on the Chilean side and its counterpart "Azufrera Rosita" on the Bolivian side of the border.

== See also ==
- List of volcanoes in Bolivia
- List of volcanoes in Chile
