= Árbol de Piedra =

Rock formation in Sur Lípez Province, Bolivia

Coordinates: 22°03′06″S 67°53′00″W

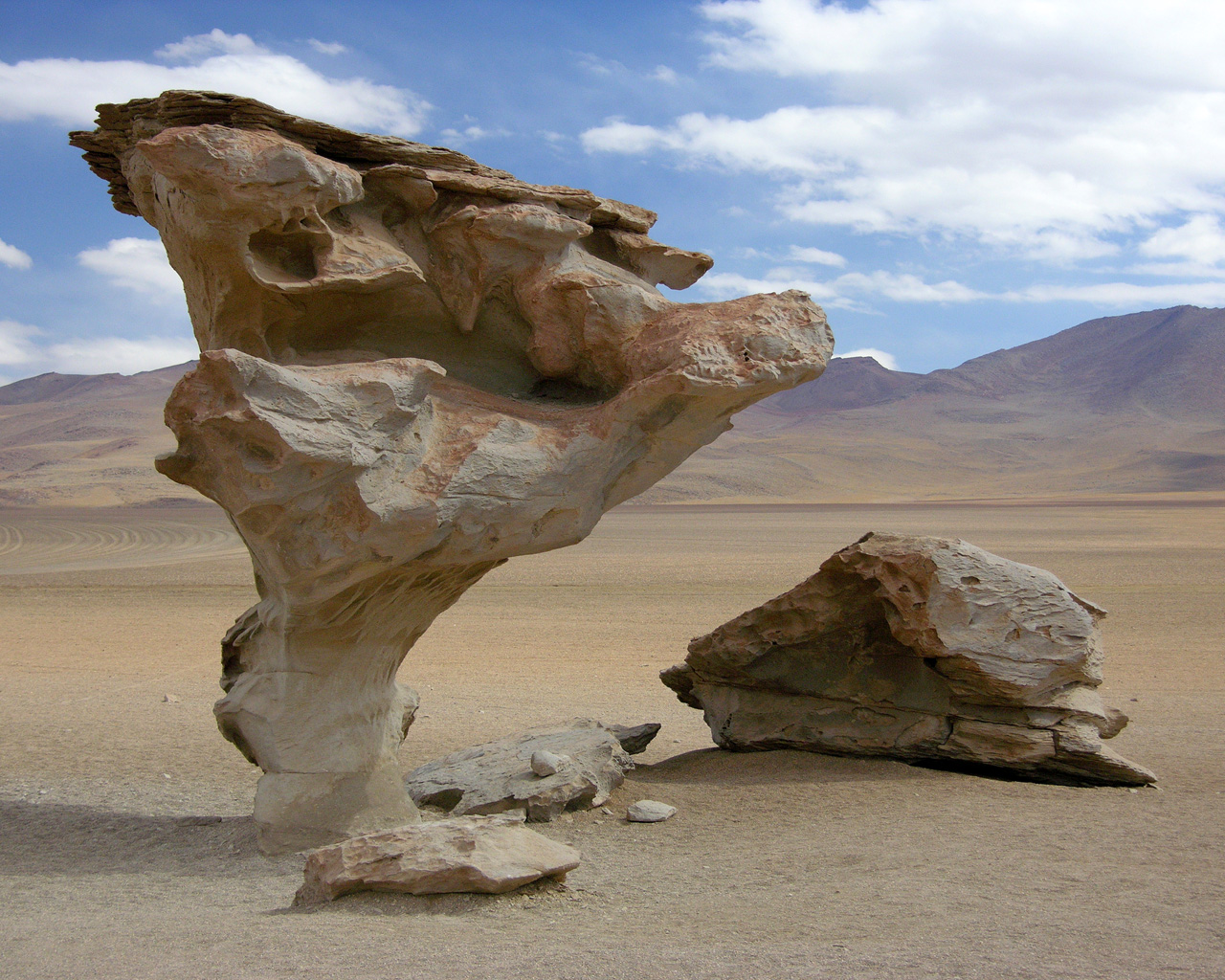
Árbol de Piedra ("stone tree") in the Eduardo Avaroa Andean Fauna National Reserve.

Árbol de Piedra ("stone tree") is an isolated ventifact rock formation in the Eduardo Avaroa Andean Fauna National Reserve of Sur Lípez Province, Bolivia. Much photographed, it projects out of the altiplano sand dunes of Siloli in the Potosí Department, about 18 kilometres (11 mi) north of Laguna Colorada. Known as the "Stone Tree," it is shaped like a stunted tree about 7 metres high. Its shape, particularly the thin stem, is due to strong winds carrying sand and eroding the soft sandstone.
