= Escalante (El Apagado) =

Mountain in Chile

Volcán Escalante
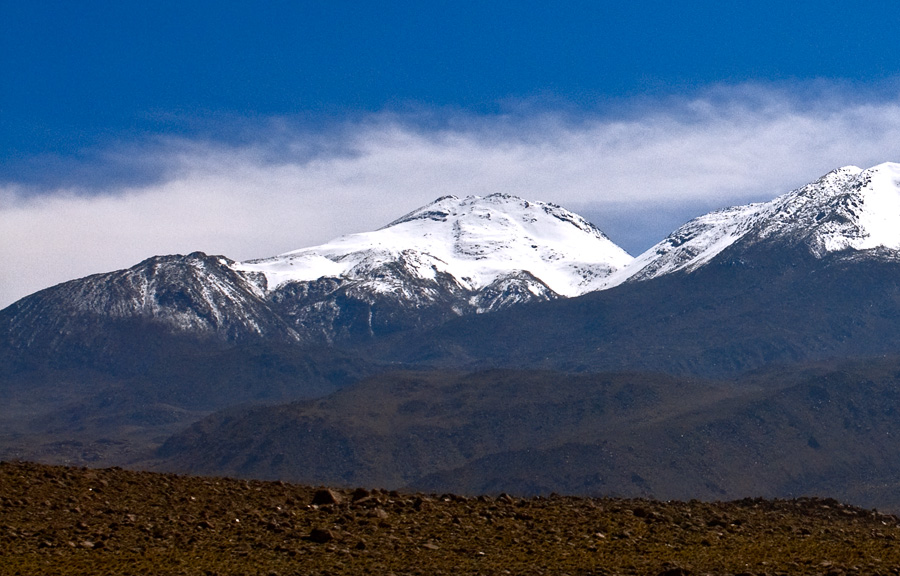
- Volcán Escalante seen from the SW.

Highest point
- Elevation: 5,819 m (19,091 ft)
- Coordinates: 22°36.762′S 67°53.031′W

Geography
- Location: Chile
- Parent range: Andes

Geology
- Mountain type: Stratovolcano

Volcán Escalante also known as "El Apagado" is a stratovolcano on the Chilean side of the border between Bolivia and Chile. It lies immediately SE of Cerro Colorado and SW to volcán Curiquinca, all of which are considered to be part of the Sairecabur volcanic group.

== See also ==
- List of volcanoes in Bolivia
- List of volcanoes in Chile
- Sairecabur
