= Salar de Chalviri =

Salt flat in Bolivia

- Salt pan, dry lake
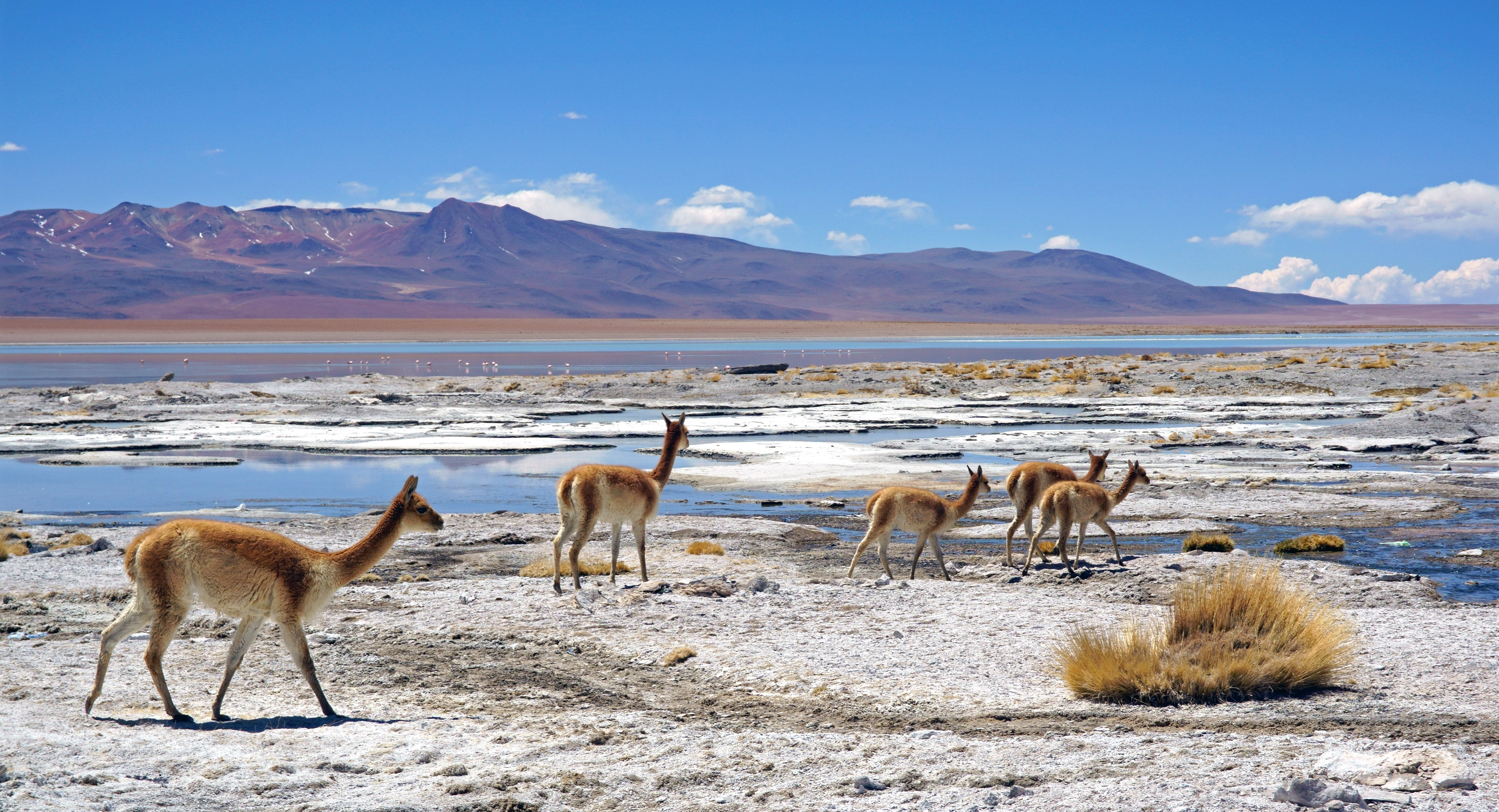
- Vicugna vicugna in Salar de Chalviri.

- Location within Bolivia
- Coordinates: 22°32′S 67°34′W
- Location: Eduardo Avaroa Andean Fauna National Reserve, Sur Lípez Province, Potosí Department
- Formed by: Evaporation
- Elevation: 4,398 m (14,429 ft)

Salar de Chalviri, also known as Salar de Ohalviri, is a salt flat in the heart of Eduardo Avaroa Andean Fauna National Reserve, in the Sur Lípez Province, Potosí Department, in southwest Bolivia. It is located at an elevation of approximately 4,398 m (14,429 ft). Salvador Dalí Desert is located to the southwest of the salt flat.
