= San Pedro de Atacama River =

San Pedro River
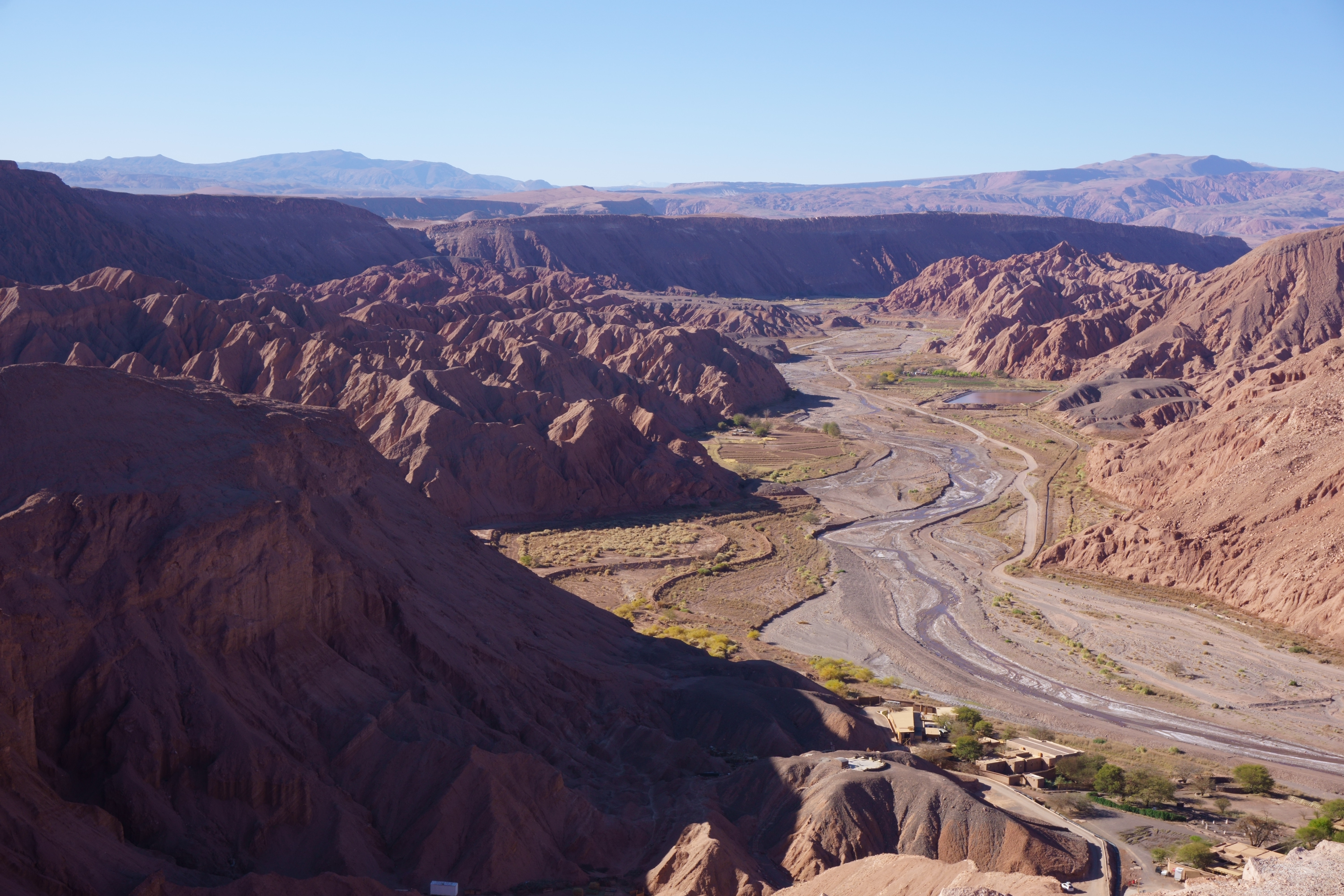
- The river as seen from the Pukará de Quitor

Location
- Country: Chile

Physical characteristics
- Mouth
  - location: Salar de Atacama
- Length: 43 km (27 mi)
- Discharge
  - average: 0.88 m^{3}/s (31 cu ft/s)

San Pedro River is a river of Chile located in the Antofagasta Region of northern Chile. It is formed at the confluence of the Grande and Salado (also known as Chuschul) rivers.

Grande River begins at the confluence of the Jauna and Putana rivers, and downstream receives the waters of the Machuca River. Putana River originates from the north slope of the volcano of the same name.

Salado River has its source at the Aguada Puripica and flows south for 43 kilometres (27 mi) until it merges with the Grande River to become the San Pedro River. From its origin, San Pedro River flows 12 kilometres (7.5 mi) south to the town of San Pedro de Atacama. From there the river follows a barely distinguishable delta-like course.

== See also ==
- List of rivers of Chile
