= Compton Spectrometer and Imager =

NASA space observatory to study gamma rays

Compton Spectrometer and Imager (COSI)
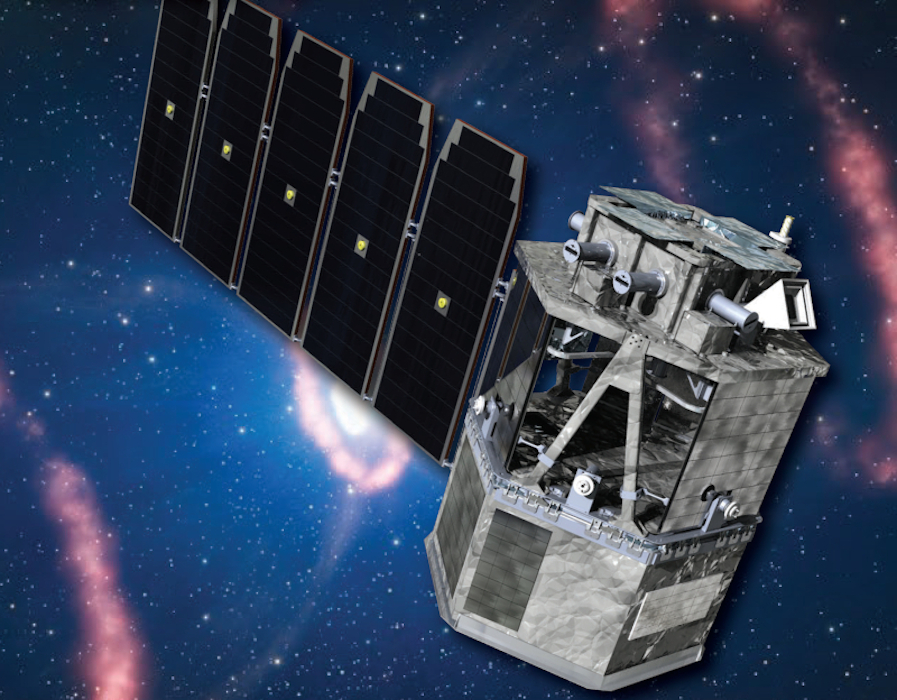
- Artistic rendering of COSI
- Names: COSI; SMEX-17
- Mission type: Gamma-ray astronomy
- Operator: University of California, Berkeley; NASA
- Website: https://cosi.ssl.berkeley.edu/

Spacecraft properties
- Spacecraft: COSI
- Payload mass: < 400 kg

Start of mission
- Launch date: August 2027 (planned)
- Rocket: Falcon 9
- Launch site: Cape Canaveral Space Force Station SLC-40
- Contractor: SpaceX

Orbital parameters
- Reference system: Geocentric orbit
- Regime: Low Earth orbit

Main Germanium detectors
- Name: Compton telescope
- Collecting area: 25% field of view of the sky

Transponders
- Band: Gamma Rays
- Bandwidth: 0.2–5 MeV
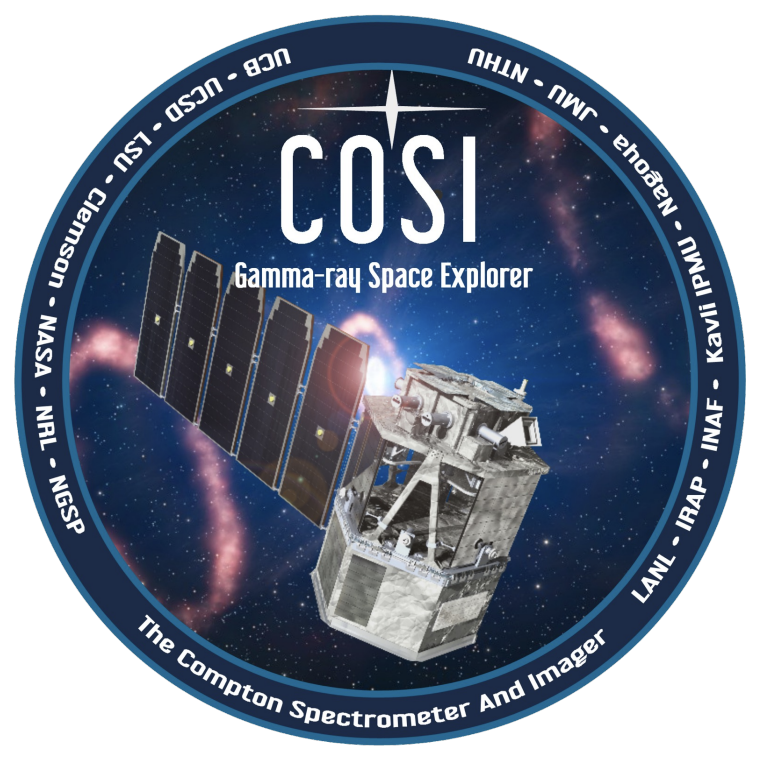
- Logo of COSI with all the participating institutions. SMEX

The Compton Spectrometer and Imager (COSI) is a NASA SMEX astrophysics mission that will launch a soft gamma-ray telescope (0.2–5 MeV) in 2027. It is a wide-field compact Compton telescope (CCT) that will partially investigate the "MeV gap" (0.1–10 MeV) with high spectral resolution but limited collecting area. It provides imaging, spectroscopy, and polarimetry of astrophysical sources, and its germanium detectors provide excellent energy resolution for emission line measurements.

The germanium detectors have an instantaneous field of view of more than 25% of the sky, and they are surrounded on the sides and bottom by active shields, which provide background rejection while also allowing for detection of gamma-ray bursts and other gamma-ray flares across the majority of the sky.

== History ==
COSI has its origins in the Nuclear Compton Telescope (NCT), which was a prototype designed to study astrophysical sources of nuclear line emission and gamma-ray polarization. The NCT was a balloon-borne soft gamma-ray telescope, flying on several high-altitude balloon missions to test and refine its technology. Flights included launches from locations such as New Zealand and Antarctica.

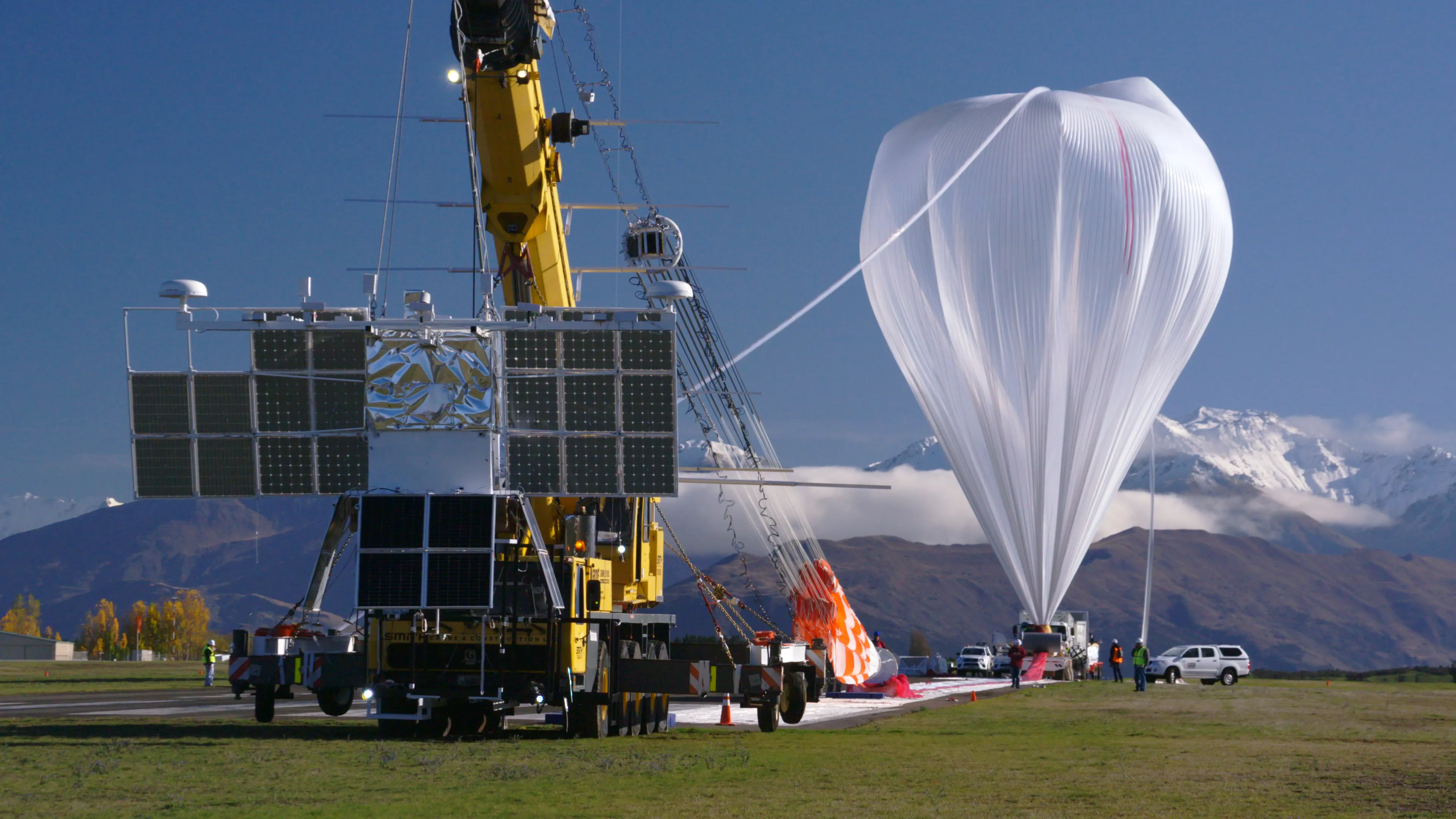
Pictured here, the 18.8 million-cubic-foot SPB prepares for lift-off with COSI from Wanaka Airport in 2016.

COSI evolved from the advancements and lessons learned from the NCT missions. The improved design incorporated germanium cross-strip detectors to enhance sensitivity and resolution. This progression culminated in the development of a more sophisticated instrument capable of high-resolution spectroscopy, wide-field imaging, and gamma-ray polarization measurements. The successful demonstration of NCT's technology in balloon missions laid the groundwork for COSI to be selected as a NASA Small Explorer (SMEX) mission.

== Mission ==
"For more than 60 years, NASA has provided opportunities for inventive, smaller-scale missions to fill knowledge gaps where we still seek answers", said Thomas Zurbuchen, associate administrator for the agency's Science Mission Directorate in Washington, D.C. "COSI will answer questions about the origin of the chemical elements in our own Milky Way galaxy, the very ingredients critical to the formation of Earth itself".

The principal investigator is John Tomsick at the University of California, Berkeley. The mission will cost approximately US$145 million, with an additional launch cost of approximately US$69 million. The spacecraft is targeted to launch August 2027 on a SpaceX Falcon 9 rocket from Cape Canaveral Space Force Station. The COSI team spent decades developing their technology through flights on scientific balloons. In 2016, they sent a version of the gamma-ray instrument aboard NASA's super pressure balloon, which is designed for long flights and heavy lifts.

NASA's Explorers Program is the agency's oldest continuous program. It provides frequent, low-cost access to space using principal investigator-led space research relevant to the astrophysics and heliophysics programs. Since the 1958 launch of Explorer 1, which discovered Earth's radiation belts, the program has launched more than 90 missions. The Cosmic Background Explorer (COBE), another NASA Explorer mission, led to a Nobel Prize in 2006 for its principal investigators. NASA's Goddard Space Flight Center in Greenbelt, Maryland, manages the program for NASA.

== Partnership ==
COSI is a collaboration between High Energy Astrophysics Group, Space Sciences Laboratory at UC Berkeley; Center for Astrophysics and Space Sciences, UCSD; Institute of Astronomy at National Tsing Hua University, Taiwan; Lawrence Berkeley National Laboratory; NASA Goddard Space Flight Center; U.S. Naval Research Laboratory; NASA Columbia Scientific Balloon Facility and NASA Super Pressure Balloon Blog.

== See also ==
- Gamma-ray astronomy
- Compton scattering
- Semiconductor detector: Germanium detectors
