= Balloon-borne telescope =

Telescope carried by a balloon

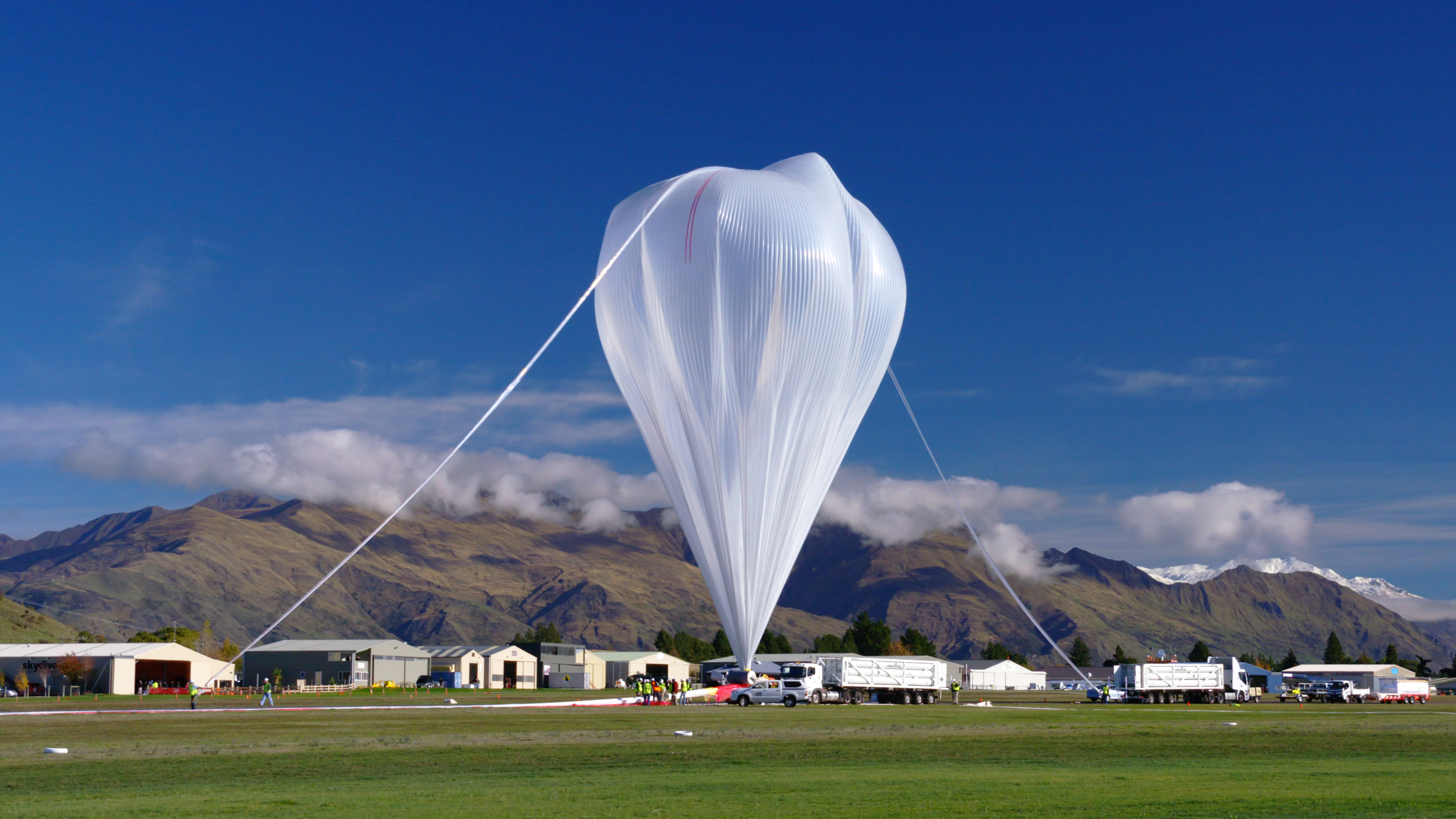
NASA super-pressure balloon flight preparation

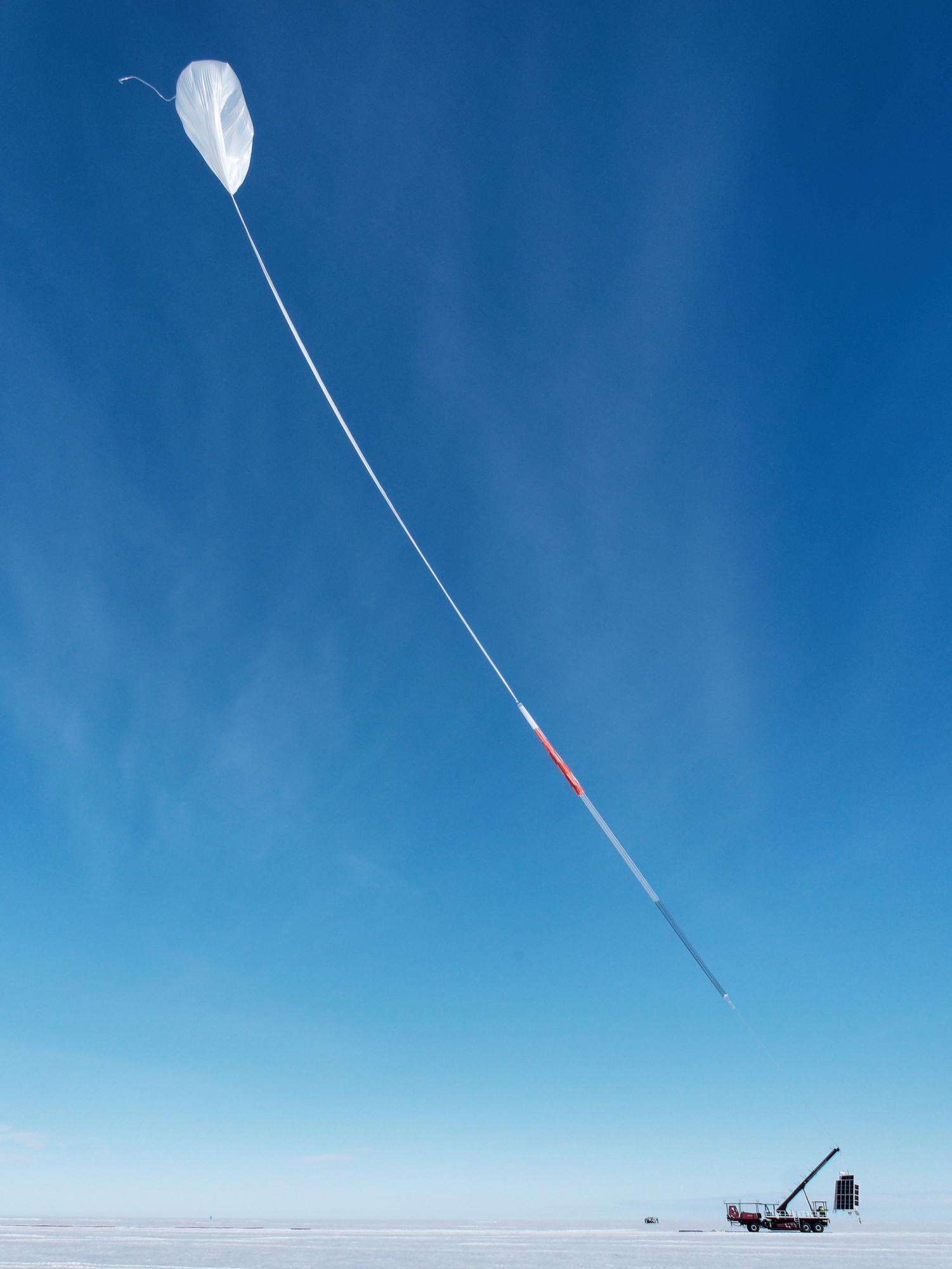
GUSTO zero-pressure balloon at launch in Antarctica. The gondola is still hanged on the vehicle.

A balloon-borne telescope is a type of airborne telescope, a sub-orbital astronomical telescope that is suspended below one or more stratospheric balloons, allowing it to be lifted above the lower, dense part of the Earth's atmosphere. This has the advantage of improving the resolution limit of the telescope at a much lower cost than for a space telescope. It also allows observation of frequency bands that are blocked by the atmosphere. Multiple cosmic-ray, neutrinos, and particle observatories and detectors were also launched on balloons.

== History ==
Balloon-borne telescopes have been used for observation from the stratosphere since the Stratoscope I was launched in 1957. A number of different instruments have since been carried aloft by balloons for observation in the infrared, microwave, X-ray and gamma ray bands. The BOOMERanG experiment, flown between 1997–2003, and the MAXIMA, which made flights in 1998 and 1999, were used to map the Cosmic Microwave Background Radiation.

== Balloons ==
There are two main types of balloons used for astronomical experiments: zero-pressure and super-pressure balloons. Zero-pressure balloons are open at the bottom and have open ducts hanging from the sides to allow gas to escape and to prevent the pressure inside the balloon from building up during gas expansion as the balloon rises above Earth’s surface. Super-pressure balloons are completely sealed and allow longer flights.

== Gondolas ==
A gondola is the structural platform that suspends beneath a balloon and serves the same function as a spacecraft bus: housing the telescope and instruments, providing power and pointing control, and protecting hardware during launch and landing. It hangs from the balloon via a flight train (a cable-and-rung ladder assembly, typically 50–60 meters long) and must withstand significant mechanical loads, particularly at landing. The frame is usually constructed from aluminum alloy and designed to meet strict structural requirements while remaining as lightweight as possible.

Because the platform hangs from a single point and experiences pendulum oscillations at multiple frequencies, achieving stability requires coordinated control across three axes. Azimuth pointing is accomplished by torquing the entire gondola against a momentum flywheel, with excess angular momentum continuously transferred to the balloon itself. Elevation control uses direct-drive motors on the telescope gimbal, and a separate roll stabilization wheel dampens high-frequency side-to-side oscillations that would otherwise degrade azimuth accuracy. Sensors include inertial measurement units, rotary encoders, and fine-pointing sun sensors that provide closed-loop feedback.

Supporting subsystems include solar arrays with battery backup for power, flight computers for command and autonomous operations, and satellite communication links for ground control. At float altitude (>35 km), atmospheric pressure drops to about 5 mbar, eliminating convective cooling and requiring passive thermal management through surface coatings and insulation. Components are often commercial off-the-shelf hardware qualified through thermal-vacuum testing for the near-space environment.

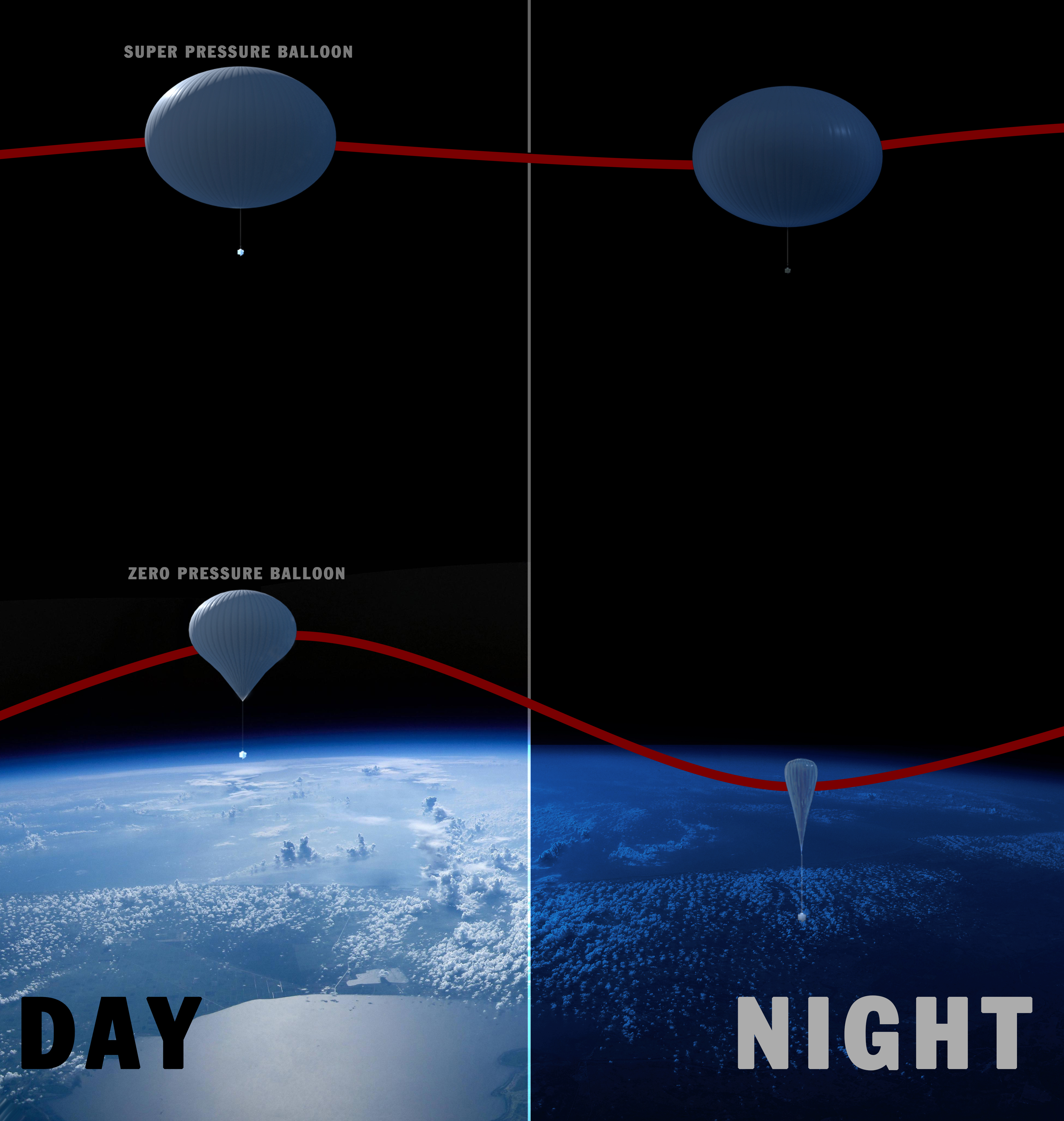
Two types of high-altitude balloons used by NASA, a zero- and super-pressure

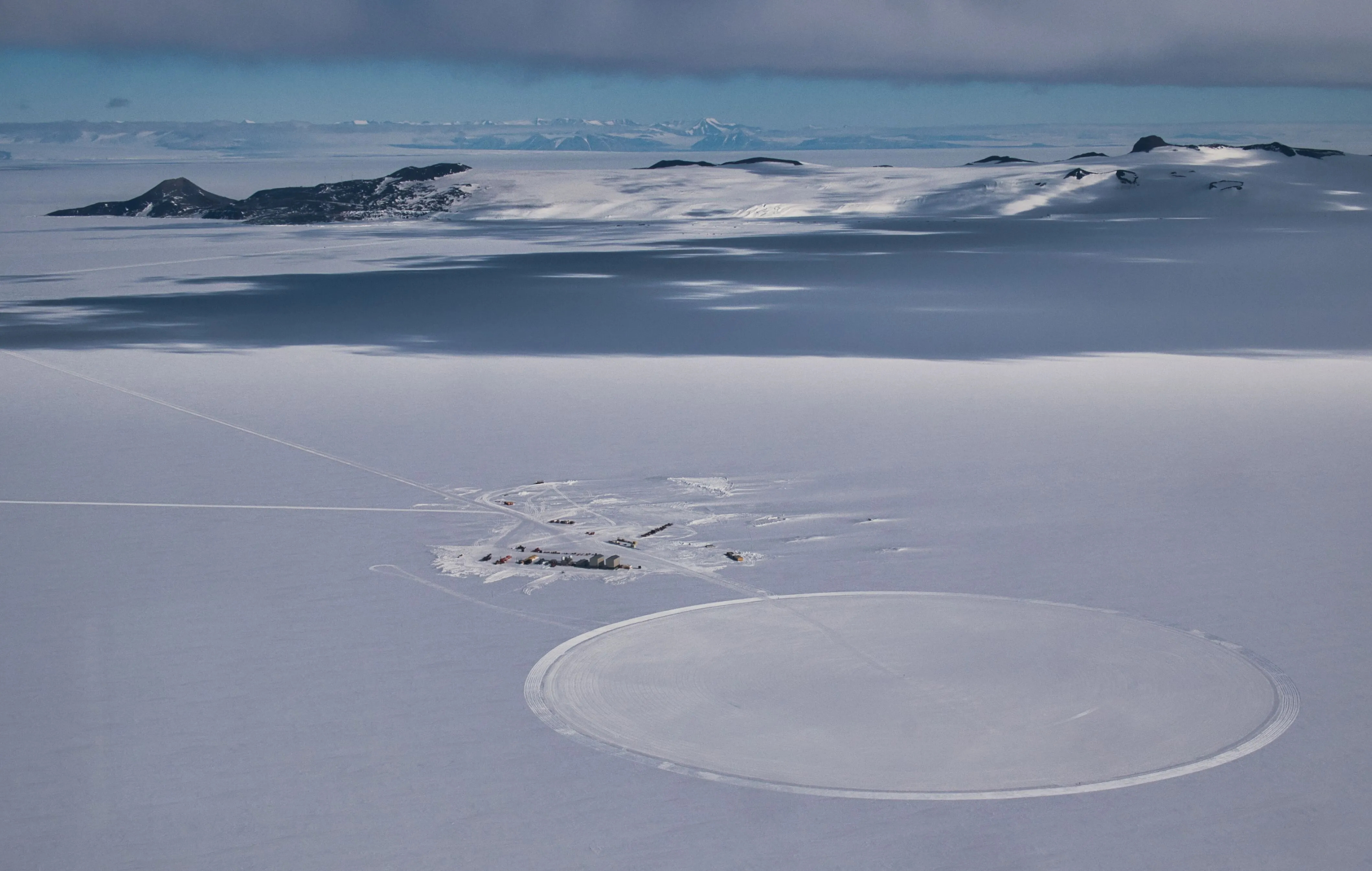
NASA's Long Duration Balloon camp is located about eight miles from the U.S. McMurdo Station on Antarctica's Ross Ice Shelf

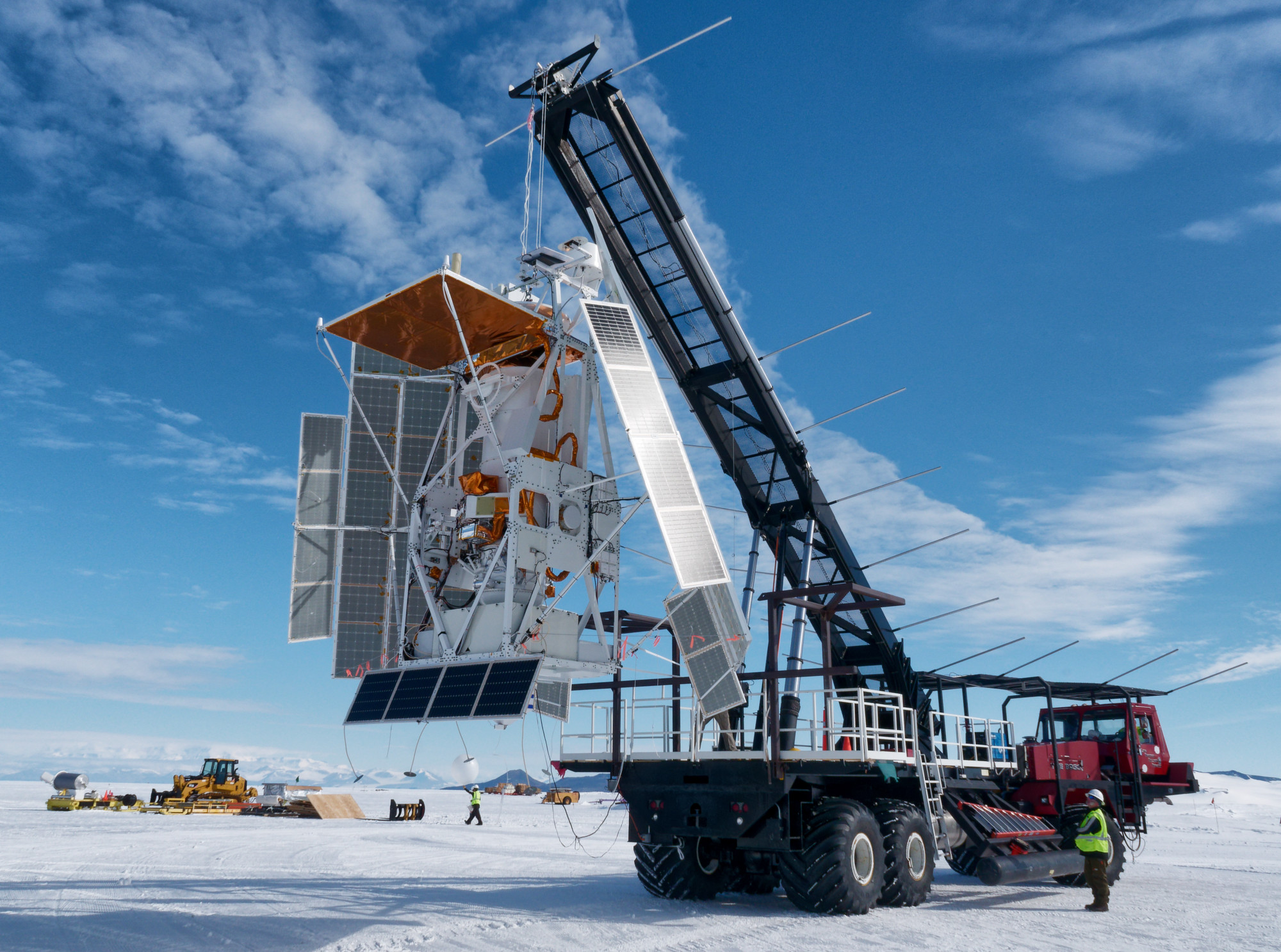
The gondola of the GUSTO telescope

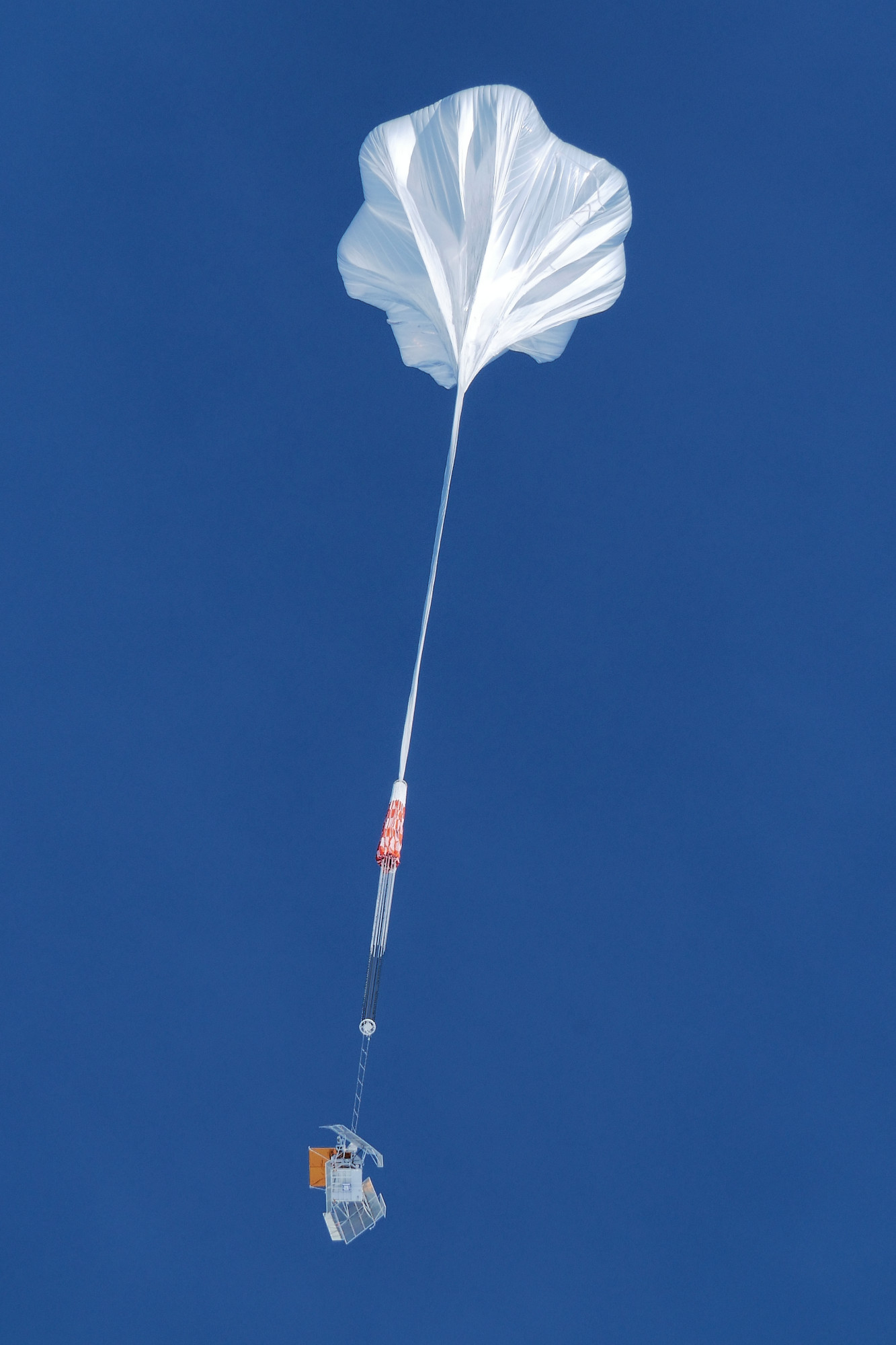
GUSTO mission after launch, the gondola is tethered to the balloon with a flight train

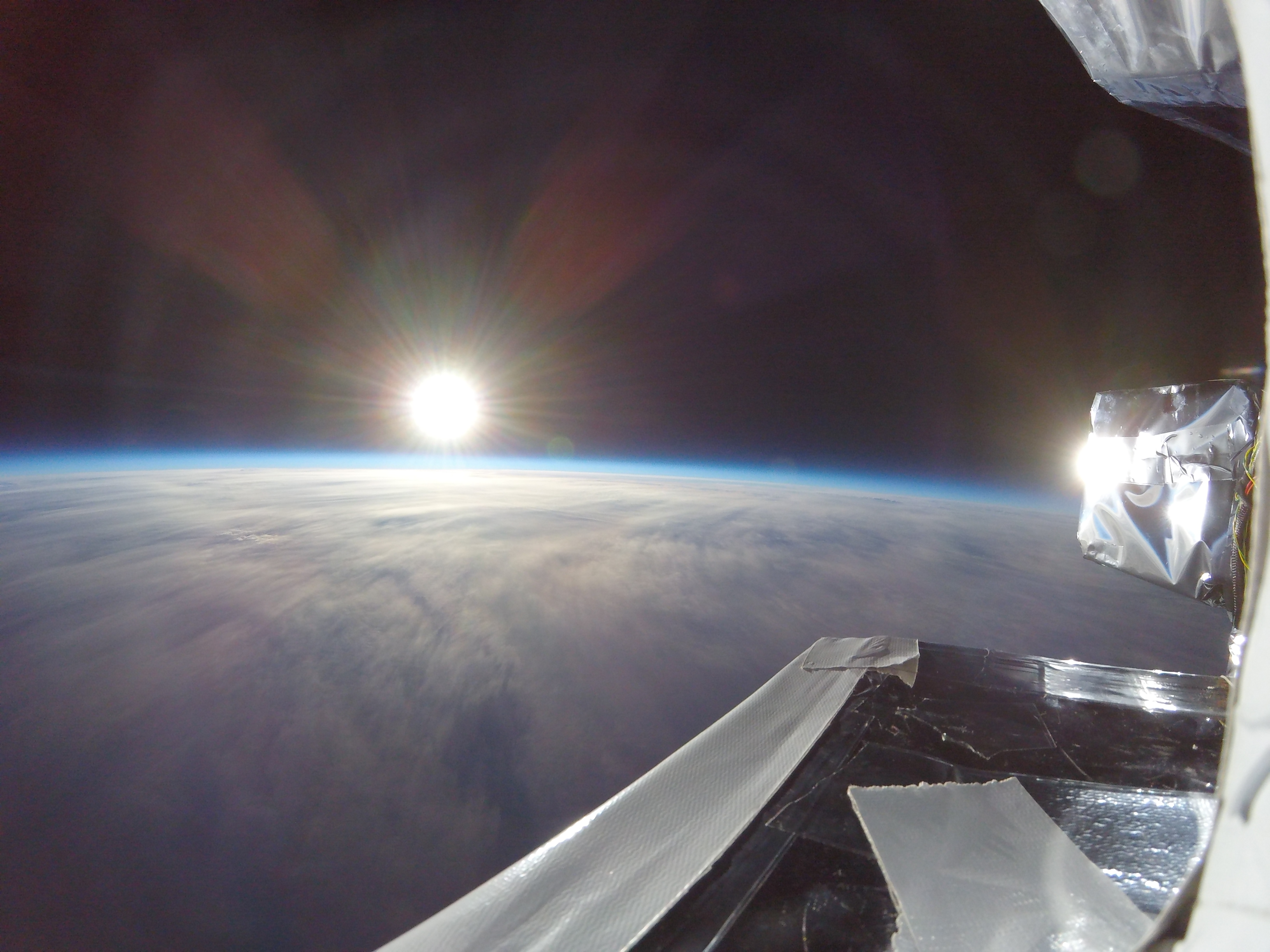
View from the SuperBIT gondola at an altitude of ~40 km

== Launch facilities ==
NASA research balloon program is supported by the Columbia Scientific Balloon Facility, which can launch balloons from Texas, New Mexico, Alaska, Manitoba (Canada), New Zealand, McMurdo Station (Antarctica), Australia, and Sweden.

== Advantages ==
Overview of wavelengths observable at different altitudes.

Balloon-borne telescopes are much cheaper than space telescopes while achieving comparable optical performance. At altitudes around 40 km, atmospheric interference becomes negligible and allows observations in multiple wavelengths. The SuperBIT mission demonstrated that balloon platforms can match Hubble-class image quality for visible wavelengths at a fraction of the cost. Unlike orbital missions, failed balloon payloads can be recovered, repaired, and relaunched, enabling iterative development cycles with simpler designs and rapid integration of improved components such as upgraded camera sensors between flights. SuperBIT, for example, was constructed largely by PhD students who subsequently founded a commercial space technology company.

Balloons also present fewer environmental drawbacks than rocket launches. They require no propellant combustion during ascent, generate no orbital debris, and avoid atmospheric re-entry burn-up at end of life.

== Disadvantages ==
Balloon-borne telescopes have the disadvantage of relatively low altitude and a flight time of only a few days. However, their maximum altitude of about 50 km is much higher than the limiting altitude of aircraft-borne telescopes such as the Kuiper Airborne Observatory and Stratospheric Observatory for Infrared Astronomy, which have a limiting altitude of 15 km. A few balloon-borne telescopes have crash landed, resulting in damage or destruction of the telescope.

The balloon obscures the zenith from the telescope, but a very long suspension can reduce this to a range of 2°. The telescope must be isolated from the induced motion of the stratospheric winds as well as the slow rotation and pendulum motion of the balloon. The azimuth stability can be maintained by a magnetometer, plus a gyroscope or star tracker for shorter term corrections. A three-axis mount gives the best control over the tube motion, consisting of an azimuth, elevation and cross-elevation axis.

== Missions ==
Name	Active	Description and purpose
Stratoscope I	1957–59	12-inch telescope attached to a polyethylene balloon (Skyhook balloon). This was the first balloon-borne astronomical telescope. It took photographic images of the sun, showing granulation features. In 1959 it was flown again, this time with a television transmitter.
Stratoscope II	1963–71	36-inch telescope with a tandem balloon system.
LEE	1968–	Low energy electron detector for solar modulation study
THISBE	1973–76	Telescope of Heidelberg for Infrared Studies by Balloon-borne Experiments. Infrared telescope used for observations of extended sources, including OH airglow, the zodiacal light, and the central galaxy region.
GRIS	1988-1995	Gamma-Ray Imaging Spectrometer
HIREGS	1991–98	High-resolution spectrometer for examining gamma ray and hard X-ray emissions from solar flares and galactic sources. It used an array of liquid nitrogen-cooled germanium detectors.
FGE	1995	The Flare Genesis Experiment, an 80 cm Sun telescope and a vector magnetograph
QMAP	1996	An experiment to measure the anisotropy of the cosmic microwave background
AESOP	1997–	Anti-Electron Sub Orbital Payload, a particle detector used to investigate the charge-sign dependence in solar modulation.
BOOMERanG	1997–2003	Microwave telescope with cryogenic detectors used to map the cosmic microwave background radiation.
TIGER	1997–2004	Trans-Iron Galactic Element Recorder, designed to measure the elemental composition of cosmic rays heavier than iron.
MAXIMA	1998–99	Microwave telescope with a cryogenic receiver that was used to measure the CMBR.
Archeops	1999	Cosmic microwave background experiment
ATIC	2000	Advanced Thin Ionization Calorimeter, measured the energy and composition of cosmic rays
TopHat	2001	An experiment to measure the cosmic microwave background radiation produced 300,000 years after the Big Bang
HERO	2001–10	Hard X-ray telescope that flew successfully beginning in 2001 but crashed in 2010, destroying the telescope.
BLAST	2003–	Submillimetre telescope with a 2 m aperture. It was destroyed during the third flight, but was rebuilt and completed a fourth flight in 2010.
InFOCμS	2004–	Hard X-ray telescope with a 49 cm^{2} collecting area.
BESS	2004	Balloon-borne Experiment with Superconducting Spectrometer designed to search for antimatter in cosmic radiation
CREAM	2004–2019	NASA experiment to determine the composition of cosmic rays.
CREST	2005–2011	The Cosmic Ray Electron Synchrotron Telescope, an experiment designed to measure the flux of primary cosmic ray electrons at energies greater than 1 TeV.
HEFT	2005	Hard X-ray telescope with grazing-incidence optics.
NCT	2005–2010	A Compton telescope to observe the gamma-ray sky in the energy range from a few hundred keV to several MeV.
ANITA	2006–2007	Antarctic Impulsive Transient Antenna, an ultra-high-energy cosmic neutrinos detector
ARCADE	2006–2011	Absolute Radiometer for Cosmology, Astrophysics, and Diffuse Emission, a NASA mission intended to measure the heating of the universe by the first stars and galaxies after the big bang and search for the signal of relic decay or annihilation
TRACER	2007	Transition Radiation Array for Cosmic Energetic Radiation, a cosmic ray detector
Sunrise	2009–	1 m ultraviolet telescope with image stabilization and adaptive optics for observing the Sun.
EBEX	2009	The E and B Experiment, an experiment that measured the cosmic microwave background radiation.
PoGOLite	2011–	Telescope for polarised hard X-rays and soft gamma-rays.
GAPS	2012–	General AntiParticle Spectrometer, designed for antideuteron search in cosmic rays
BRRISON	2013	Balloon Rapid Response for ISON, a NASA mission to study comet C/2012 S1 (ISON).
HEROES	2013	High-Energy Replicated Optics for Exploring the Sun, an upgraded version of HERO.
SuperTIGER	2013–2017	Super Trans-Iron Galactic Element Recorder, a NASA cosmic ray detector mission
BARREL	2013–2020	Balloon Array for Radiation-belt Relativistic Electron Losses, a NASA mission to study X-rays in Earth’s atmosphere near the North and South poles.
BOPPS	2014	The Balloon Observation Platform for Planetary Science, a NASA mission which observed Oort Cloud comets, the asteroid Ceres and the double star Castor.
STO 1 and 2	2014–2016	The Stratospheric Terahertz Observatory, a NASA exploratory mission for the GUSTO telescope.
Spider	2015–	Submillimeter telescope searching for primordial gravitational waves.
SuperBIT	2015–	Near-IR to Near-UV, wide-field, optically diffraction-limited telescope mapping out dark matter distribution in galaxy clusters through weak lensing.
BACCUS	2016	The Boron And Carbon Cosmic rays in the Upper Stratosphere, a NASA experiment to study cosmic rays and the chemicals and atoms that make up the interstellar space.
COSI	2016	Compton Spectrometer and Imager Science, a Compton telescope for soft gamma-rays
PIPER	2017–	Primordial Inflation Polarization Explorer, a NASA mission of twin telescopes super-cooled to near absolute zero for increased sensitivity to detect the faint, remnant heat radiation from the big bang.
ASHI	2021	All-Sky Heliospheric Imager, a NASA experiment to test the instrument’s capability to reduce stray light and observe the solar wind from here on Earth.
BALBOA	2021	BALloon-Based Observations for sunlit Aurora, a NASA experiment to test a wide-view infrared camera designed to study daytime auroras.
BBC	2021	Balloon-borne Chirpsounder, a NASA experiment to measure how the radio signals ping off and through the ionosphere before bouncing back to its detectors.
BOOMS	2021	Balloon Observation of Microburst Scales, a NASA experiment to observe microbursts, flashes of X-ray light that sporadically appear in the polar atmosphere.
ComPair	2023	ComPair, short for "Compton scattering and pair production". A high-resolution calorimeter to measure lower-energy Compton-scattered gamma rays.
GUSTO	2023	Galactic/Extragalactic ULDB Spectroscopic Terahertz Observatory, a NASA mission designed to study the interstellar medium.
EXCITE	2024	EXoplanet Climate Infrared TElescope, a NASA mission designed to study atmospheres around exoplanets.
BVEX	2025	Balloon Borne Very Large Baseline Interferometry Experiment, an experiment to improve images of the regions around supermassive black holes
PUEO	2025	Payload for Ultrahigh Energy Observations, a particle detector for Askaryan emission from neutrinos interacting in the ice, geomagnetic (and Askaryan) emission from tau leptons, and geomagnetic emission from Ultra-High Energy cosmic rays
ASTHROS	Future, NET 2026	Astrophysics Stratospheric Telescope for High Spectral Resolution Observations at Submillimeter-wavelengths, a NASA mission to research stellar feedback in the Milky Way.
GigaBIT	Future	Gigapixel-class Balloon-borne Imaging Telescope, a successor to SuperBIT. It will be "a three-mirror anastigmat (TMA) system with a 1.34m primary mirror designed to perform wide-field imaging with diffraction limited resolutions in the near ultraviolet (NUV) over a wide field, giving it a resolution of better than 0.1 arcseconds".

== See also ==
- Balloon satellite
- Airborne telescope
