= Gamma-Ray Imaging Spectrometer =

Balloon-borne gamma-ray spectrometer instrument

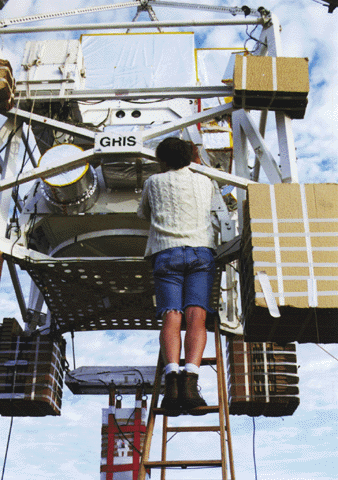
- The GRIS instrument in preparation for a launch
- Alternative names: GRIS
- Location(s): Alice Springs, Town of Alice Springs, Northern Territory, AUS
- Wavelength: –
- First light: May 1988
- Width: 2.45 m (8 ft 0 in)
- Mass: 1,634 kg (3,602 lb)
- Website: asd.gsfc.nasa.gov/archive/gris/gris.html
- Related media on Commons

The Gamma-Ray Imaging Spectrometer (GRIS) was a gamma-ray spectrometer balloon-borne instrument. It used germanium detectors to achieve high resolution spectroscopy. GRIS was operated from 1988 to 1995 by NASA's Goddard Space Flight Center, which called it "arguably one of the most successful gamma-ray balloon programs in history".

== History ==
GRIS followed earlier gamma ray spectroscopy work by Bell Labs/Sandia National Laboratories and co-investigators Marvin Leventhal and Bonnard Teegarden, including the LEGS spectrometer. GRIS was selected for a balloon program after the removal of a high-resolution gamma-ray spectrometer from the payload of what would become the Compton Gamma Ray Observatory.

GRIS first flew in May 1988 from Alice Springs, Australia. During its first several flights, the instrument definitively measured the gamma ray lines from Supernova 1987A, including that of ^{56}Co, and the positron annihilation line from the Galactic Center at 511 keV, elucidating the nature of these emissions. These measurements resulted in two letters in Nature and three in The Astrophysical Journal, and earned the John Lindsay Memorial Award for Science from Goddard Space Flight Center.

GRIS was flown a total of nine times between 1988 and 1995, with a total flight time of 223 hours. In a configuration that included a wide-field collimator and blocking crystal mechanism, GRIS measured the diffuse galactic and cosmic gamma-ray spectra, yielding insight into the production of ^{26}Al in the galaxy. During its final two flights from Alice Springs, GRIS carried the PoRTIA instrument, which yielded measurements of the CdZnTe detector background for use in future instrument design.

Following the program, the Goddard team proposed transferring the instrument to the University of Maryland to be refurbished for the Long Duration Balloon program, which would entail reconfiguring the instrument for wide field-of-view studies of diffuse emissions. The program would involve graduate and undergraduate student researchers, and would address observation regimes inaccessible to the INTEGRAL mission.

== Specifications ==
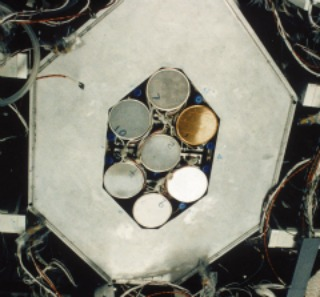
The germanium detectors of the GRIS instrument

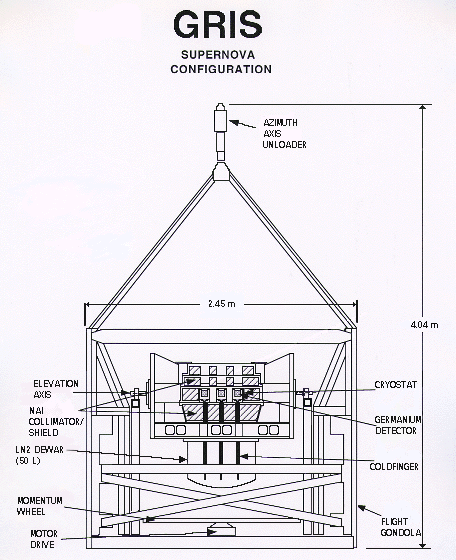
One configuration of the GRIS instrument

The GRIS instrument was flown with a helium-filled balloon to a typical altitude of 40 kilometres (25 mi).

The GRIS instrument carried seven n-type germanium detectors with a range of sensitivity between 20 and 8000 keV and a combined energy resolution of 1.8 keV at an energy of 500 keV. Each detector was 6.5 cm (2.6 in) in diameter by 6.5 cm (2.6 in) deep (among the largest in the world at the time), for a total detector area of 242 square centimetres (37.5 in^{2}) and a total detector volume of 1,560 cubic centimetres (95 in^{3}). The liquid nitrogen-cooled detectors were shielded on all sides by 15 centimetres (5.9 in) of NaI active anticoincidence shielding for rejection of background events. The instrument had a three-sigma narrow line sensitivity of 1.7 × 10^{−4} picohenries per square centimeter per second at 500 keV over 12 hours, and a field of view (FWHM) of 17 degrees at 500 keV.

The experimental payload had a weight of 1,634 kilograms (3,602 lb), and used 350 Watts of power. It relied on a momentum wheel for azimuth control, and a magnetic pointing reference, with a star tracker and Sun sensor for verification. The instrument delivered telemetry at a rate of 55.2 kbps.

== Team ==
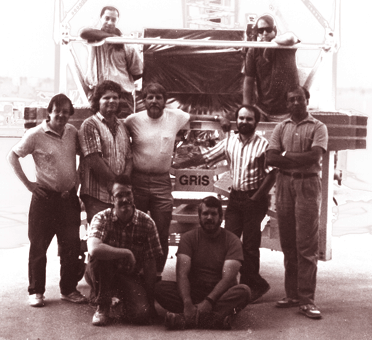
The GRIS instrument team with the instrument in the spring of 1992

The principal investigator of the GRIS project was Jack Tueller, with co-investigators Scott Barthelmy, Lyle Bartlett, Neil Gehrels, Marvin Leventhal, Juan Naya, Ann Parsons, and Bonnard Teegarden.
