= Lazarus effect (disambiguation) =

The Lazarus effect is a concept in semiconductor physics. Lazarus effect may also refer to:

- The Lazarus Effect (novel), a 1983 novel by Frank Herbert and Bill Ransom
- The Lazarus Effect (2010 film), a documentary film about AIDS
- The Lazarus Effect (2015 film), a supernatural horror film directed by David Gelb and written by Luke Dawson and Jeremy Slater.

== See also ==
- Lazarus (disambiguation)
- Lazarus phenomenon
- Lazarus taxon
- The Lazarus Experiment
