= High-energy replicated optics =

Ballon-born telescope

High-Energy Replicated Optics
- Focal length: 6 m (19 ft 8 in)
- Website: wwwastro.msfc.nasa.gov/research/hero/hero_index.html

High-energy replicated optics (HERO) is a high-altitude balloon-borne x-ray telescope based at the Marshall Space Flight Center. Its mirrors are conical approximations to Wolter type 1 geometry. The proving flight, at least, used a high-pressure gas scintillation proportional counter with relatively low spatial resolution.

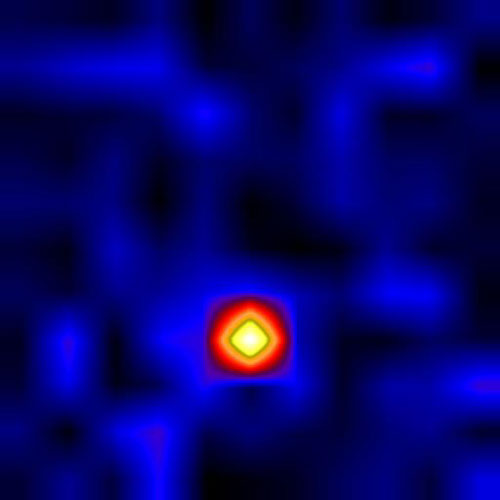
This X-ray image of Cygnus X-1 was taken by HERO. Note the low spatial resolution of the image. NASA image.

== See also ==
- High energy X-ray imaging technology
- X-ray astronomy
