= Cadmium zinc telluride =

Metal alloy

Cadmium zinc telluride, (CdZnTe) or CZT, is a compound of cadmium, zinc and tellurium or, more strictly speaking, an alloy of cadmium telluride and zinc telluride. A direct bandgap semiconductor, it is used in a variety of applications, including semiconductor radiation detectors, photorefractive gratings, electro-optic modulators, solar cells, and terahertz generation and detection.

== Characteristics ==
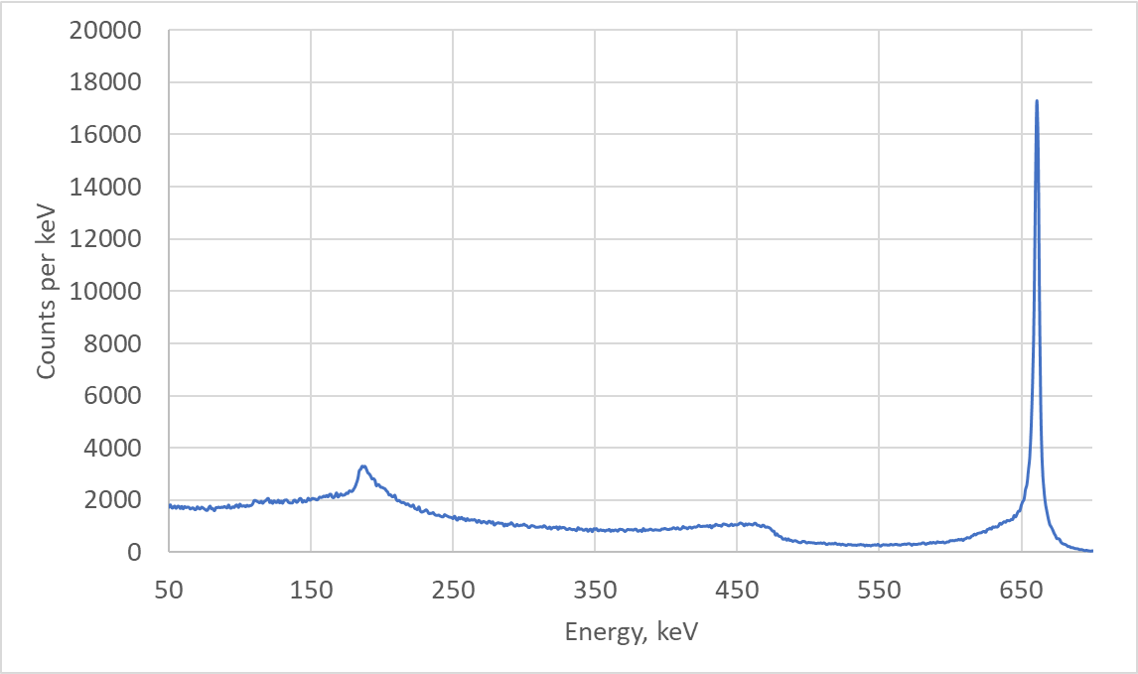
A Cs-137 gamma-ray spectrum collected using an M400 pixelated CZT imaging spectrometer. Energy resolution, as measured by full-width-at-half-maximum (FWHM), is better than 1%.

The CZT band gap varies from approximately 1.4 to 2.2 eV, depending on composition. A 1 cm^{3} CZT crystal has a sensitivity range of 30 keV to 3 MeV with a 2.5% FWHM energy resolution at 662 keV. Pixelated CZT with a volume of 6 cm^{3} can achieve 0.71% FWHM energy resolution at 662 keV and perform Compton imaging.

== Applications ==
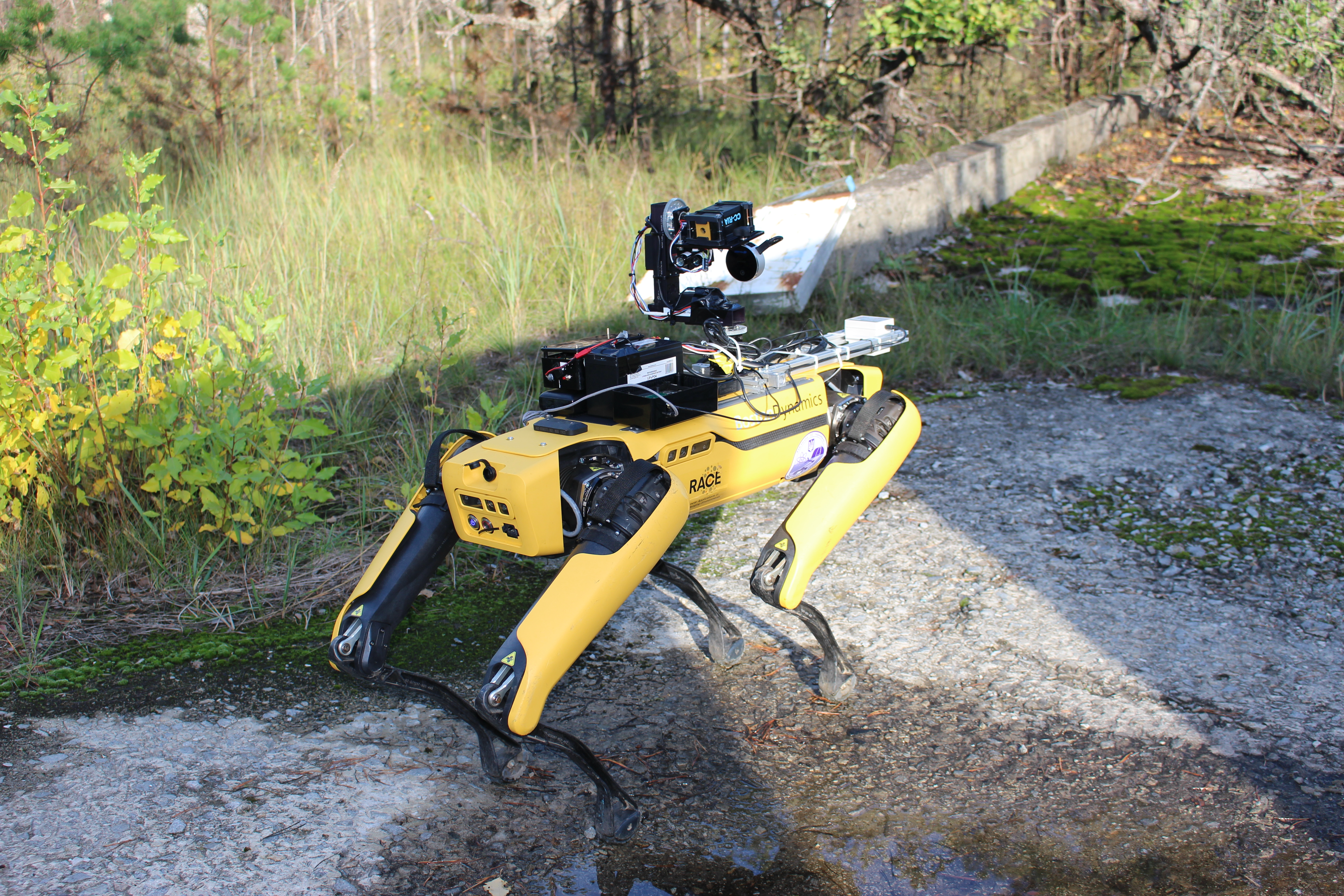
A YanDavos radiation sensor system based on a 1 cm^{3} CZT crystal, deployed on a Boston Dynamics Spot quadruped robot for radiation mapping in the Chernobyl Exclusion Zone

Radiation detectors using CZT can operate in direct-conversion (or photoconductive) mode at room temperature, unlike some other materials (particularly germanium) which require cooling or technologies that require a photomultiplier tube. Their relative advantages include high sensitivity for X-rays and gamma rays, due to the high atomic numbers of Cd and Te, and better energy resolution than scintillator detectors. This allows for reduced radiation dosage, reduced data acquisition time, and small instruments.

CZT can be formed into different shapes for different radiation-detecting applications, and a variety of electrode geometries, such as coplanar grids and small pixel detectors, have been developed to provide unipolar (electron-only) operation, thereby improving energy resolution.

== Production ==
Monocrystalline CZT is produced by only a few companies worldwide, with demand exceeding supply in 2025. Furthermore, China placed export controls on CZT in 2025. Consequently, some projects may recycle CZT from other equipment, or use the cadmium telluride as a substitute.

== See also ==
- Scintillator
- Cadmium telluride
- Zinc telluride
- Telluride (chemistry)
