= Stratoscope =

Pair of balloon-borne telescopes

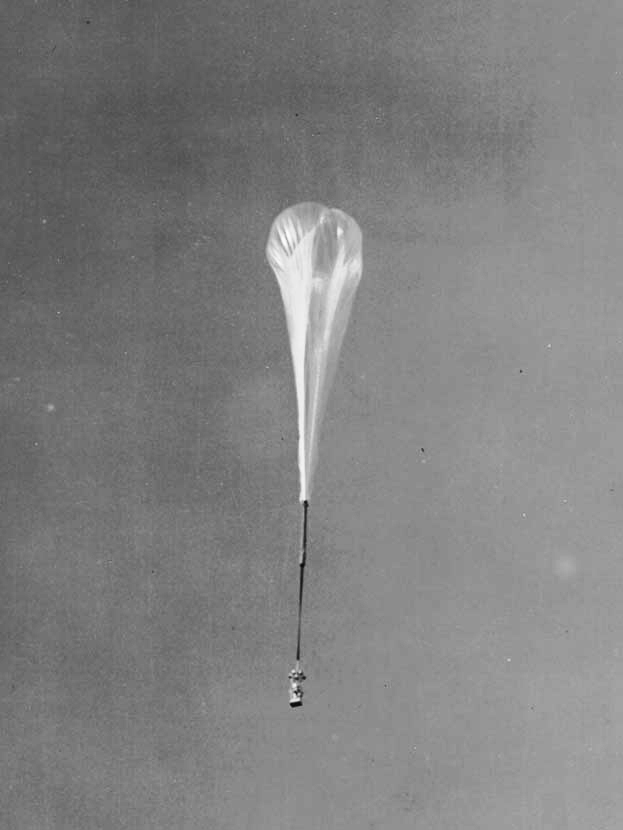
- Stratoscope I
- Related media on Commons

The Stratoscopes were two balloon-borne astronomical telescopes which flew from the 1950s to the 1970s and observed in the optical and infrared regions of the spectrum. Both were controlled remotely from the ground.

Stratoscope I possessed a 12-inch (30.48 cm) mirror and was first flown in 1957. It was conceived by Martin Schwarzschild and built by the Perkin Elmer Corporation with funding provided by the Office of Naval Research. A small secondary mirror focussed the image from the primary into a 35 mm movie camera, which captured the images on film. Schwarzschild used the telescope to study the turbulence and granulation in the Sun's photosphere.

Stratoscope II, a 36-inch (91.4 cm) reflecting telescope, flew from 1963 to 1971. This larger project proved to be beyond the ability of the university-led research team funded by ONR and, later, the National Science Foundation, so was managed by NASA as a beginning of its scientific ballooning program led by Nancy Grace Roman. The gondola it was mounted on weighed 3.5 tons. It studied planetary atmospheres, the atmospheres of red giant stars, and galaxies. On early flights of Stratoscope II, photographic film was used, but this was soon replaced by television detectors.
