= Primordial Inflation Polarization Explorer =

High-altitude scientific balloon program

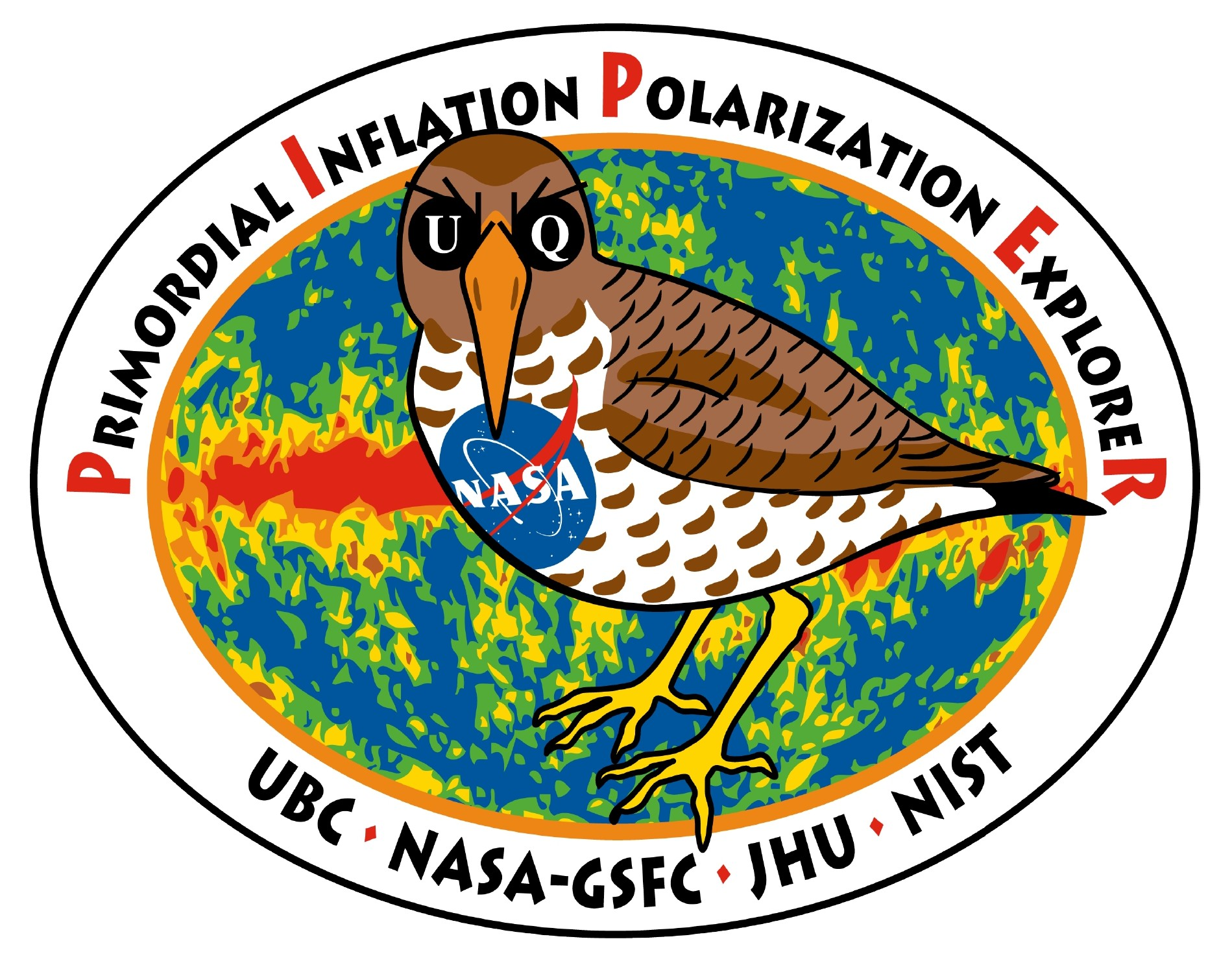
PIPER logo

Primordial Inflation Polarization Explorer (PIPER) was a NASA high-altitude scientific balloon program designed to fly a millimeter-wave telescope.

== Description ==
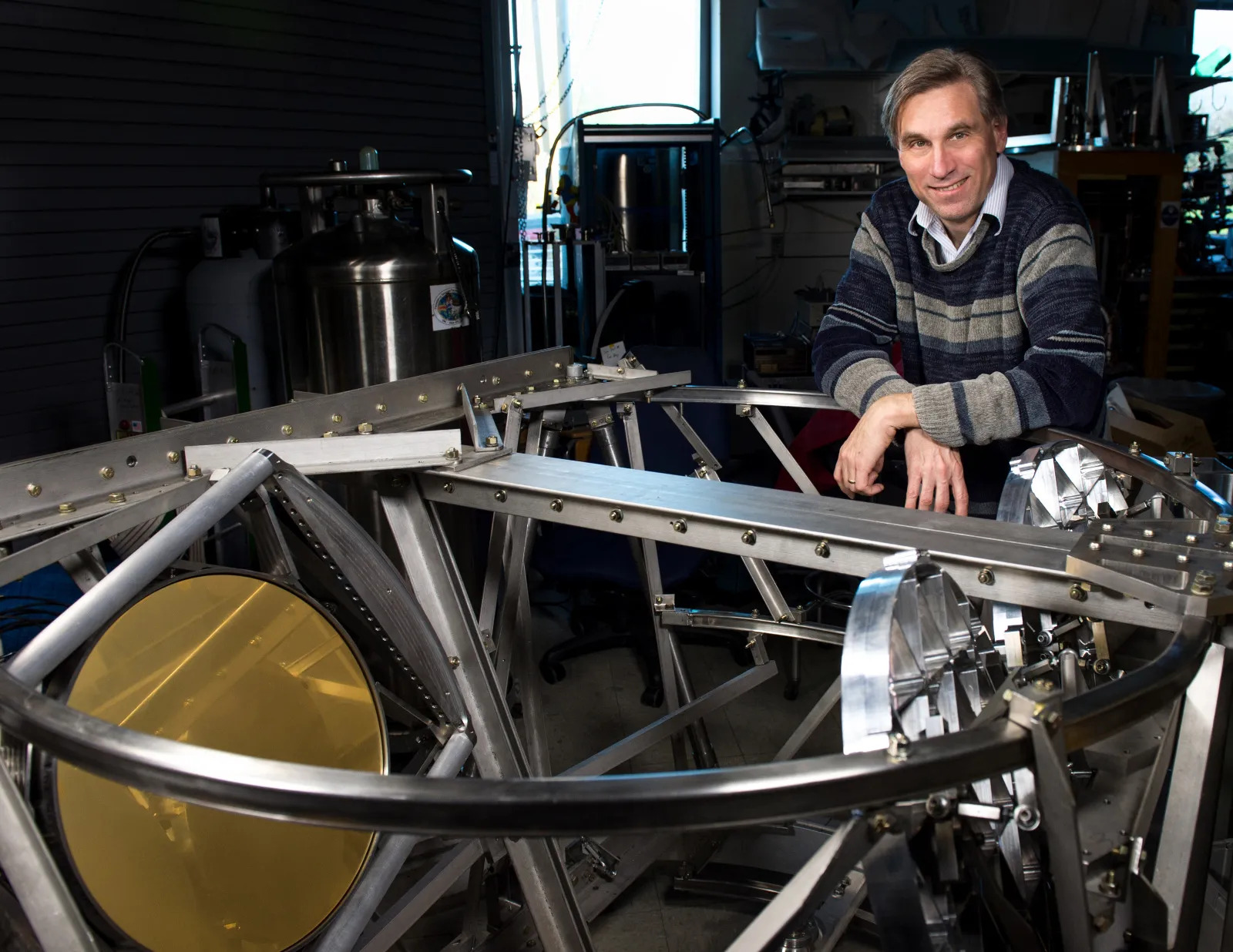
Al Kogut with PIPER

PIPER was designed to investigate cosmological inflation, looking for a predicted signature of primordial gravitational waves that would prove the infant universe expanded far faster than the speed of light and began growing exponentially almost instantaneously after the Big Bang.

The program was planned and funded by NASA's Goddard Space Flight Center; its principal investigator was the astrophysicist Al Kogut.

PIPER had four separate 1,280-pixel bolometer arrays based on the so-called backshort under grid (BUG) architecture developed by NASA researchers. The technique places reflective optical structures, called backshorts, one-quarter of a wavelength of light behind each pixel in the bolometer plane. The backshort reflects light back into the absorber, thereby increasing the detector's sensitivity. Before the detectors receive the light for analysis, the incoming radiation must first enter an open aperture, where it meets the variable polarization modulator made of a grid of closely placed copper-plated tungsten wires and a mirror situated behind the grid. It ensures that only polarized light reaches PIPER's optics. From the optics, the modulated light travels to the four identical BUG arrays. The detectors are cooled to -272 °C with an adiabatic demagnetization refrigerator, also developed by NASA. Cooling is needed because the polarization signal is very faint.

PIPER was designed to observe the whole sky at four different frequencies — 200, 270, 350, and 600 GHz.

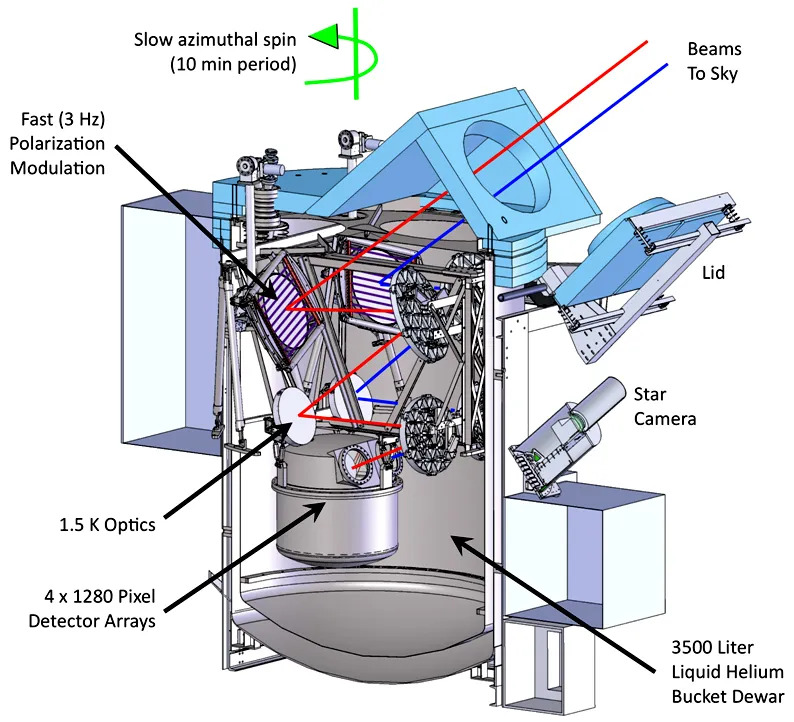
Schema of the telescope

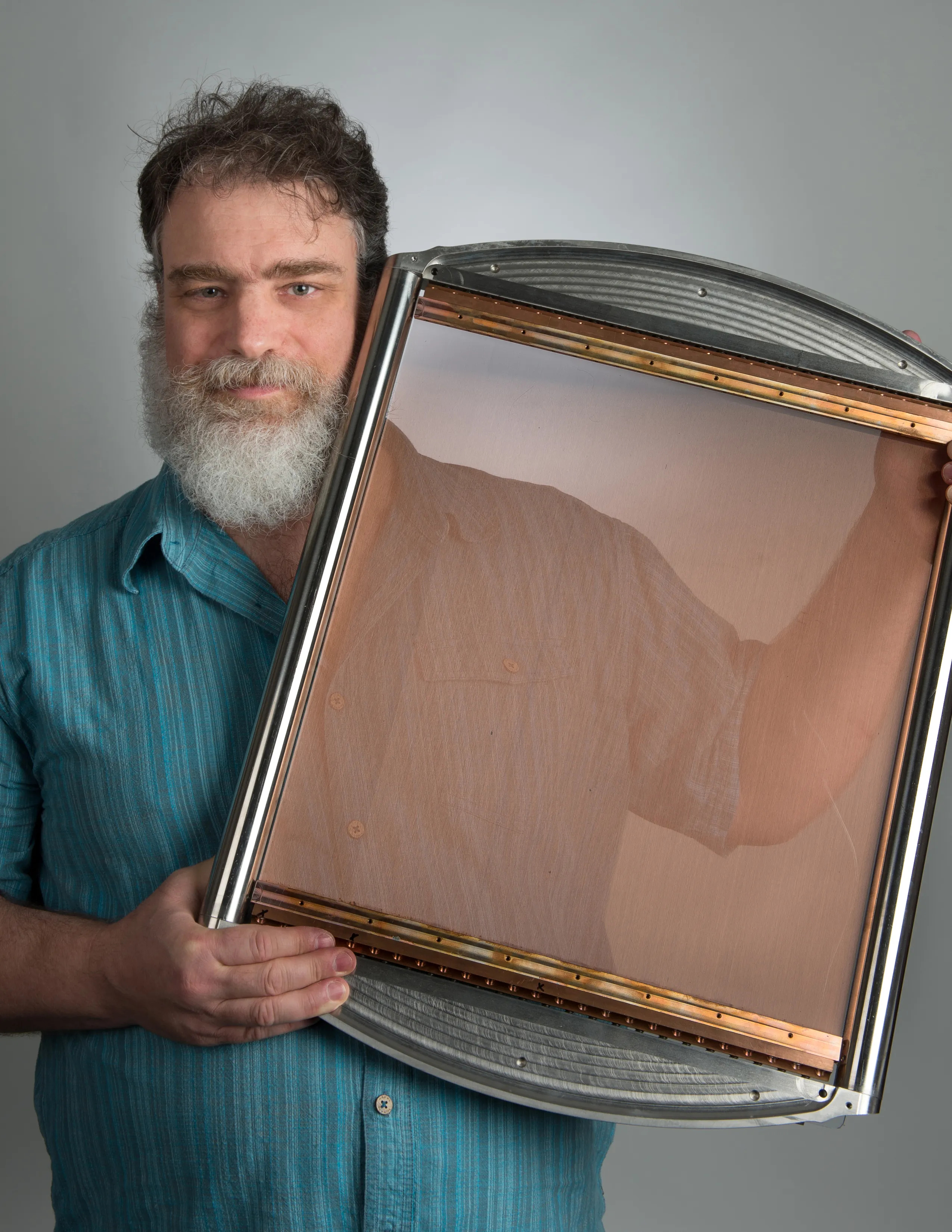
Engineer Paul Mirel with the variable modulator

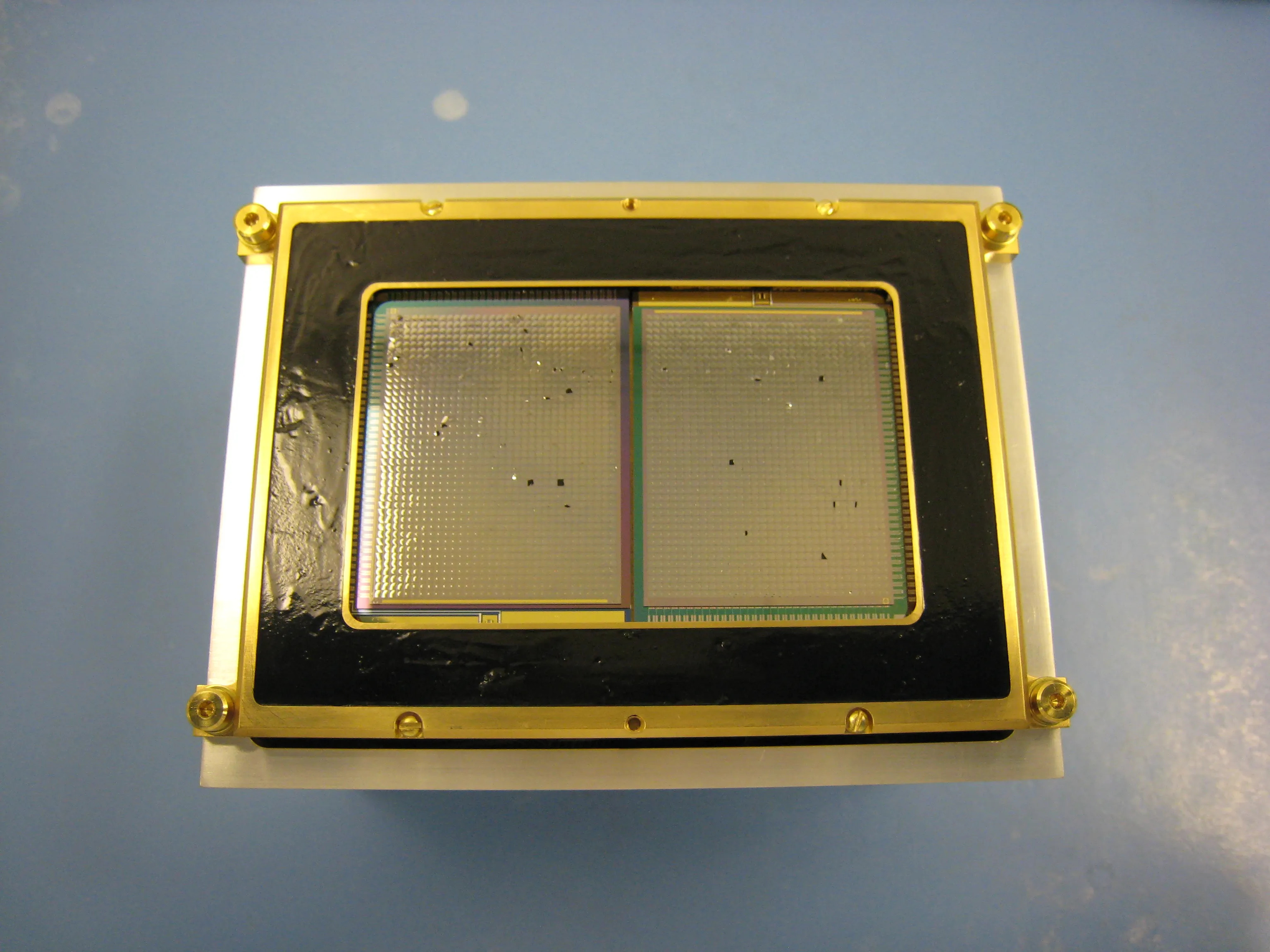
PIPER kilopixel detector array

== Launch ==
PIPER was launched on October 14, 2019, from NASA's Columbia Scientific Balloon Facility in Ft. Sumner, New Mexico, and landed after 13 hours. Observation hatch failed to open, so no observations were performed.
