= ASTHROS =

Planned NASA balloon-borne telescope

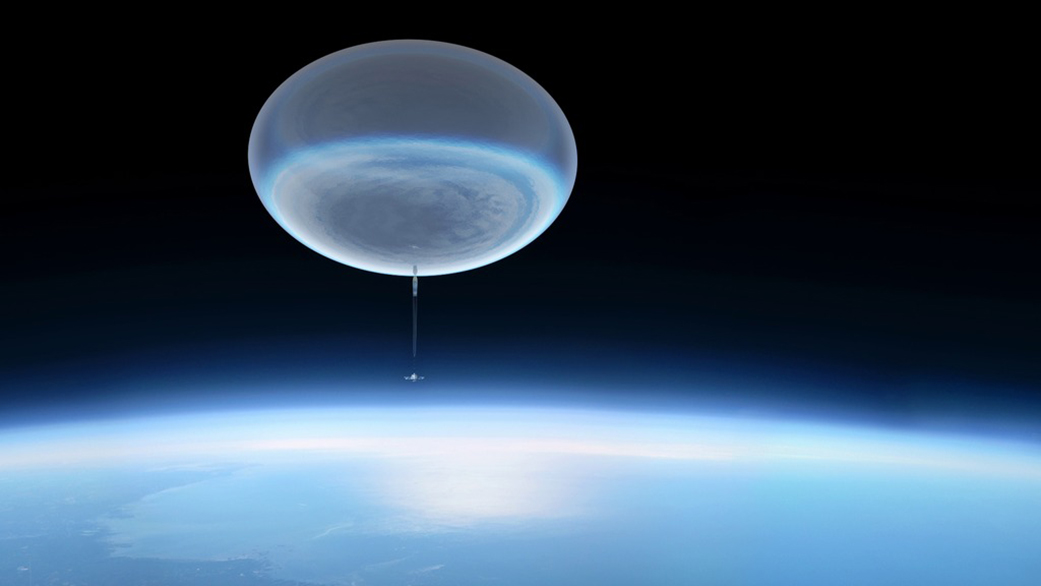
Artist's view of the ASTHROS balloon

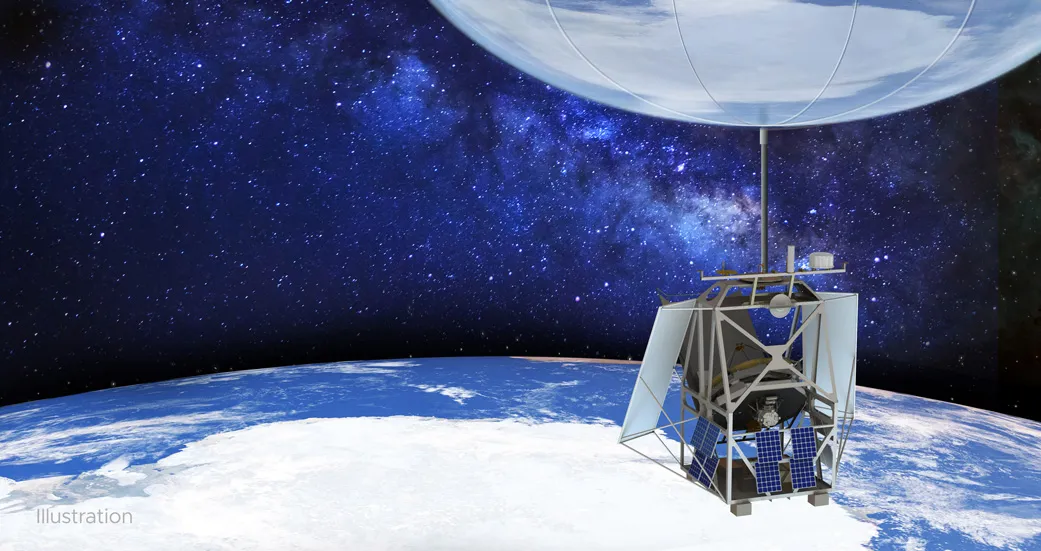
Artist's view of the ASTHROS balloon observatory

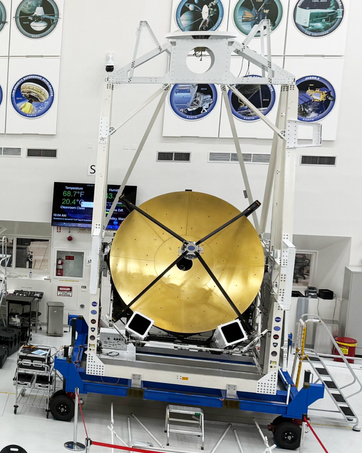
ASTHROS telescope mirror

ASTHROS, Astrophysics Stratospheric Telescope for High Spectral Resolution Observations at Submillimeter-wavelengths, is a planned NASA balloon-borne telescope. Originally planned to launch on December 1, 2024, it will be the largest ever balloon observatory with a 400 foot balloon and 2.5 metre far-infrared telescope. It will be launched from the Antarctic and is envisioned to last for four weeks. Its primary mirror consists of nine panels and is 8.2-foot (2.5-meter) in diameter. Optics is produced by Italian manufacturer Media Lario. The balloon may reach an altitude of 130,000 feet (40 kilometers).

When fully inflated, the 40-million-cubic-feet helium balloon will be about 400 feet (150 meters) wide. The current best estimate for the weight of the observatory, including the gondola, solar panels, antenna, scientific instrument and communication systems, is about 5,500 pounds (2,500 kilograms). The telescope's detectors must be cooled down to 4 Kelvin using a cryocooler powered by electricity from its solar panels. One of ASTHROS' main science goals is to provide new information about stellar feedback in the Milky Way and other galaxies, a process in which stars either accelerate or decelerate the formation of new stars in their galaxy. ASTHROS will be the first mission to conduct high spectral resolution spectrometry in a few specific wavelengths of light, and identify two specific nitrogen ions that are formed by the processes that drive stellar feedback. As a target of opportunity, ASTHROS will observe TW Hydrae.
