= Nuclear Compton Telescope =

Telescope to observe Gamma-ray sky

The Nuclear Compton Telescope (NCT) is a balloon-borne Compton telescope to observe the gamma-ray sky in the energy range from a few hundred keV to several MeV. Its main goals are to improve the understanding of Galactic nucleosynthesis, gamma-ray bursts, supernovae, black holes, and more.

== Instrumentation ==
The Compton telescope uses an array of twelve germanium detectors with high spectral resolution to detect gamma rays. On its bottom half the detector is surrounded by a bismuth germanate scintillator to shield it from atmospheric gamma rays. The telescope has an overall field of view (FOV) of 25% of the sky.

== Flights ==
Since low-to-medium-energy gamma rays are only detectable from above the atmosphere, NCT is launched with a large 1-million m^{3} (35-million ft^{3}) helium balloon into the stratosphere. So far NCT had two successful and one unsuccessful balloon campaigns:

- A two-detector prototype was successfully test flown on 1 June 2005 from the Scientific Balloon Flight Facility, Fort Sumner, New Mexico.
- On 19 May 2009, the full instrument successfully launched from Fort Sumner in New Mexico and was able to observe the Crab Pulsar.
- Unfortunately, on 28 April 2010 a launch mishap occurred at Alice Springs, Australia, when the gondola release mechanism failed, leading to the partial destruction of the gondola.
