= Štefan Jánoš =

Slovak-Swiss physicist

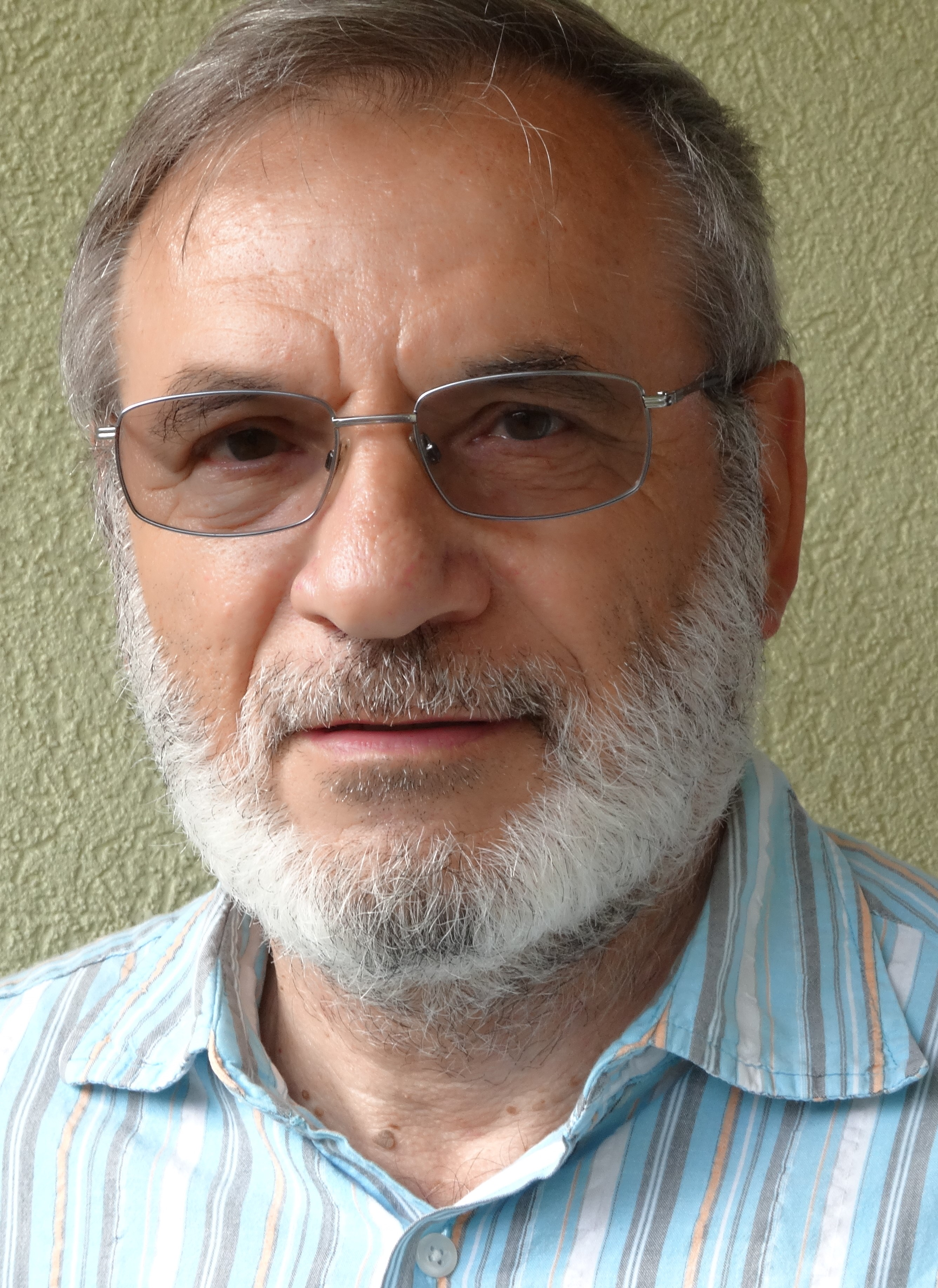
- Jánoš in c. 2019
- Born: 22 December 1943 (age 82); Kuchyňa, Slovak Republic
- Other name: Stefan Janos
- Citizenship: Slovakia, Switzerland
- Education: CVUT
- Scientific career
- Fields: Physics
- Workplaces: Pavol Jozef Šafárik University in Košice; Institute of Experimental Physics of the Slovak Academy of Sciences (SAS) in Košice; Comenius University; University of Bern

Štefan Jánoš (also known as Stefan Janos; born 22 December 1943) is a Slovak-Swiss physicist and university professor. He is the founder of very low temperature physics in Slovakia.

== Life ==
Štefan Jánoš was born on 22 December 1943 in Kuchyňa, Slovak Republic. From 1950 to 1958, he attended the primary school in Suchohrad and Záhorská Ves and between 1958–1961 the high school in Malacky. Thereafter he studied at the Czech Technical University, Faculty of Technical and Nuclear Physics in Prague. In 1966 he graduated from university with diploma thesis " Specific heat of Fe–Co alloys in the temperature range 1.4 to 4.2 K. He spent his one-year military service mainly at the Research and Test Centre of the Ministry of Defence in Brno. In August 1967 he joined the Faculty of Science at Pavol Jozef Šafárik University in Košice. There he started to build a new laboratory for very low temperature physics. Three years later he spent a study visit in Prof. Boris. N. Eselson laboratory in B Verkin Institute for Low Temperature Physics and Engineering of the National Academy of Sciences of Ukraine in Kharkov . He participated in experiments on the influence of ^{3}He atoms on the superfluid state of ^{4}He at 0.5 K. In 1972 he worked at the Aalto University of Helsinki in Prof. Olli Lounasmaa Low Temperature Laboratory in Otaniemi, Finland. Together with Yuri D. Anufriev he participated in experiments on the search for superfluid state in 3He using Pomeranchuk cooling. He received his PhD in physics from P.J. Šafárik University, Košice, in 1976 under the supervision of Prof. Vladimir Hajko. His dissertation dealt with the magnon heat transfer in thulium and erbium-yttrium alloys between 0.4 K and 4.2 K and in magnetic fields up to 3 tesla. From 1980 to 1984 he was head of the Department of Low Temperature Physics in the Institute of Experimental Physics of the Slovak Academy of Sciences (SAS) in Košice. His main research interests concentrated on superfluid 3He, nuclear cooling, point-contact spectroscopy and cryogenic applications in ophthalmology, gynaecology and plastic surgery. He constructed various cryogenic apparatus for cryosurgery. In 1982 he habilitated on thermal conductivity of Ce, Pr, Nd, Sm, Eu in the temperature range from 0.5 K to 10 K. Between 1984 and 1990 he worked at the Faculty of Mathematics, Physics and Informatics of the Comenius University in Bratislava. He held lectures on optics and low temperature physics. His scientific research focused on superfluid 3He and high-temperature superconducting thin REBaCuO films (RE = Y, Dy, Ho, Gd, Sm, Nd, Eu). On 15 June 1990, as an assistant professor, he joined the Laboratory for High Energy Physics of the University of Bern in Switzerland, which was headed by Prof. Klaus Pretzl. He took a leading role in the development of the SSG (Superconducting superheated granules) detector for low-energy neutrinos and dark matter. He took part in experiments using neutron beam to study nuclear recoil on Sn, Zn and Al nuclei conducted at the Paul Scherrer Institute in Switzerland. In his scientific work at the Laboratory for High Energy Physics in Bern he studied phase transition in Sn, Zn, In, and Al granules and also Al- and In- microstructures using SQUID (Superconducting Quantum Interference Device). He took a leading role in the development, construction and installation of the ORPHEUS detector for dark matter search in the Bern Underground Laboratory. He held exercises and lectures for students of physics on mechanics, electricity, magnetism and modern physics. He also lectured on superfluidity, superconductivity and physical properties of solids at low temperatures. He participated in the discovery of the Lazarus effect (1997), which consists in the functional recovery of the silicon detectors exposed to heavy radiation. On 1 March 2004 he was appointed professor at the University of Bern. From 2006 to 2009 he worked at the Laboratory for High Energy Physics on the design and installation of a central liquid argon system. Additionally he was deeply involved in the construction of cryostats with high vacuum systems for time projection chambers and design of so-called Argontube to study very long (a few meters) electron drifts in liquid argon. He retired on 1 February 2009.

== Awards ==
In 1988 he was the co-recipient of the Prize of Slovak Academy of Sciences for the applications of point-contact spectroscopy below 1K. In 2003 he was awarded Dionýz Ilkovič Honorary Badge of the Slovak Academy of Sciences for his achievements in low temperature physics and for the development of superconducting detectors for particle physics.

In 2009 he was awarded the Gold Medal of the Faculty of Science of the Pavol Jozef Šafárik University in Košice for his contribution to the development of the faculty, the establishment of the Low Temperature Laboratory and for his efforts in education. At the occasion of the 40-th anniversary of the Institute of Experimental Physics SAS in Košice, he obtained the Gold Badge for his contributions to the scientific development of the Institute of Experimental Physics, SAS.

Štefan Jánoš is honorary member of the Slovak Physical Society.

== Work ==
- Books in English
  - Vladimír Hajko, et al.: Physics in experiments / 1997, ISBN 80-224-0483-7 (co-author)
- Books in Slovak
  - Štefan Jánoš: Fyzika nízkych teplôt ('Low Temperature Physics'), ALFA, Bratislava 1980 (monograph)
  - Hajko et al.: Physics in Experiments, VEDA, Bratislava 1988,(co-author)
  - Štefan Jánoš: Svet v blízkosti asolútnej nuly 1990, ISBN 80-05-00045-6 /The world in the vicinity of absolute zero/view(popular book)

== See also ==
- List of Swiss scientists
- List of Slovak Physicists
