= TopHat (telescope) =

Astronomical experiment

- Location: Antarctica
- Coordinates: 85°08′54″S 164°26′31″W
- Location within Antarctica

TopHat was a scientific experiment launched from McMurdo Station in January 2001 to measure the cosmic microwave background radiation produced 300,000 years after the Big Bang. The balloon was launched on January 2, 2001 and proceeded to fly for 644 hours over the continent of Antarctica before landing on January 31, 2001. The balloon flew over the continent 38 kilometers (125,000 ft) above the ground. The working payload was shut down on January 10, 2001 after the liquid cryogens cooling the detectors were exhausted, and the balloon simply circled the continent until it was safe to land. The vorticial winds that typically carry balloons around the continent dissipated part of the way through the flight, and the balloon had to be terminated in a suboptimal location. The landing missed the targeted ice shelf by around one half mile, and while the discs containing the information were recovered safely using a Twin Otter, the gondola itself had not been recovered by August 2001.

The telescope was called part of the "Submillimeter Astrophysics Experiment" for Dr. Edward Cheng of NASA’s Goddard Space Flight Center. It took roughly 6 years to build and deploy. It was built in association with NASA’s Goddard Space Flight Center, the University of Chicago, the University of Wisconsin–Madison and the Danish Space Research Institute. TopHat experiment was the first of its kind in that it placed the telescope on top of the actual balloon, where it rotated at a constant rate around a vertical axis and covered a 48-degree-diameter window of the sky. The placement allowed for the telescope to gain a unique view of the sky, with no obstructions. The balloon itself took up 29.5 million cubic feet (835,000 m^{3}) of space.

TopHat was built in part to follow up the observations of the BOOMERanG experiment which also studied the cosmic background radiation. TopHat was attempting to detect the clumpiness of matter, how much matter was in the universe, how the universe was expanding, and if it was indeed flat as had been observed by BOOMERANG. Around 300,000 years after the big bang, the temperature of the universe cooled enough so that hydrogen atoms formed and the photons of energy (the radiation of energy from the explosion) were able to escape and travel indefinitely. This oldest source of radiation has a temperature of 2.73 K and is uniform except for one part in 100,000 where the temperature is slightly different. The patchiness of matter indicates the earliest structures being formed in the universe and TopHat was designed to detect this patchiness on roughly degree scales.
