= Cadmium telluride =

Semiconductor chemical compound used in solar cells

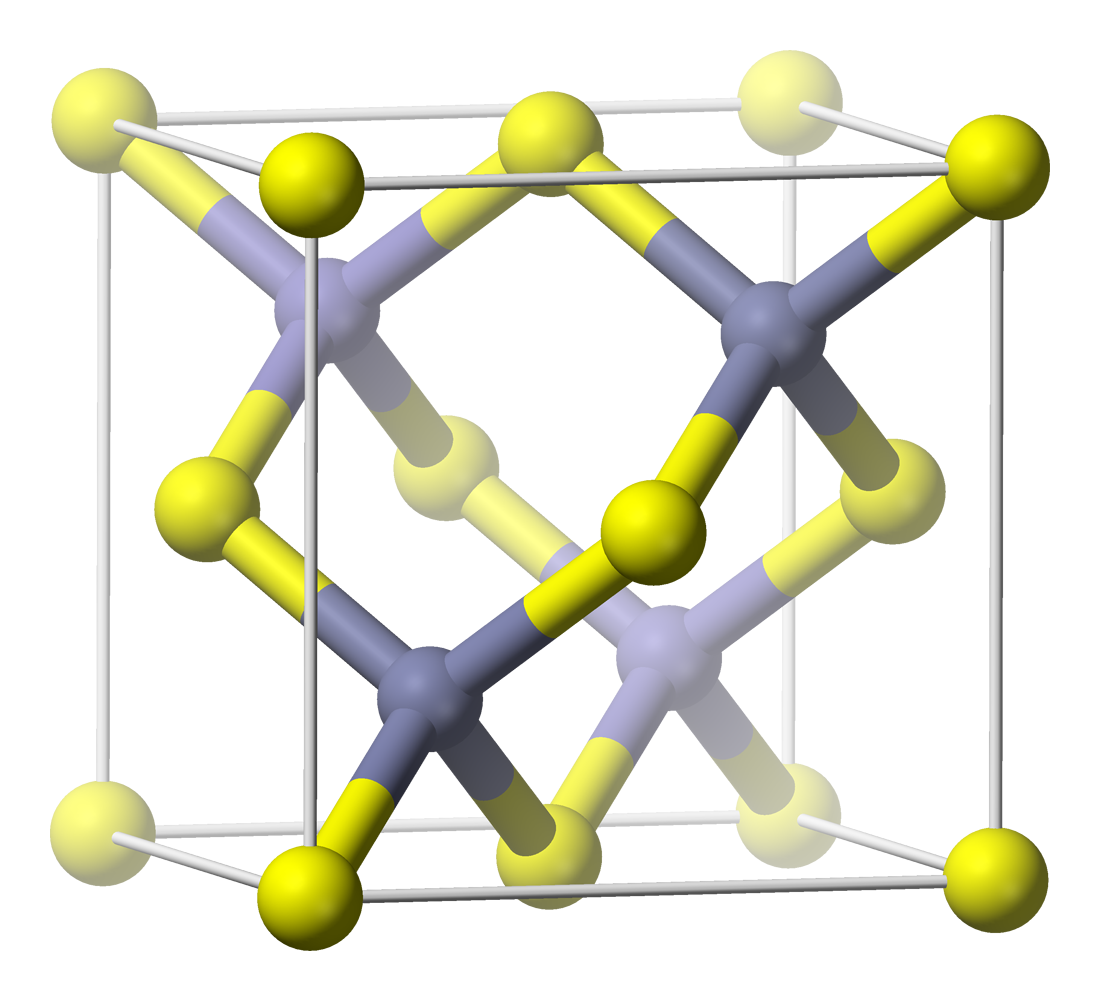

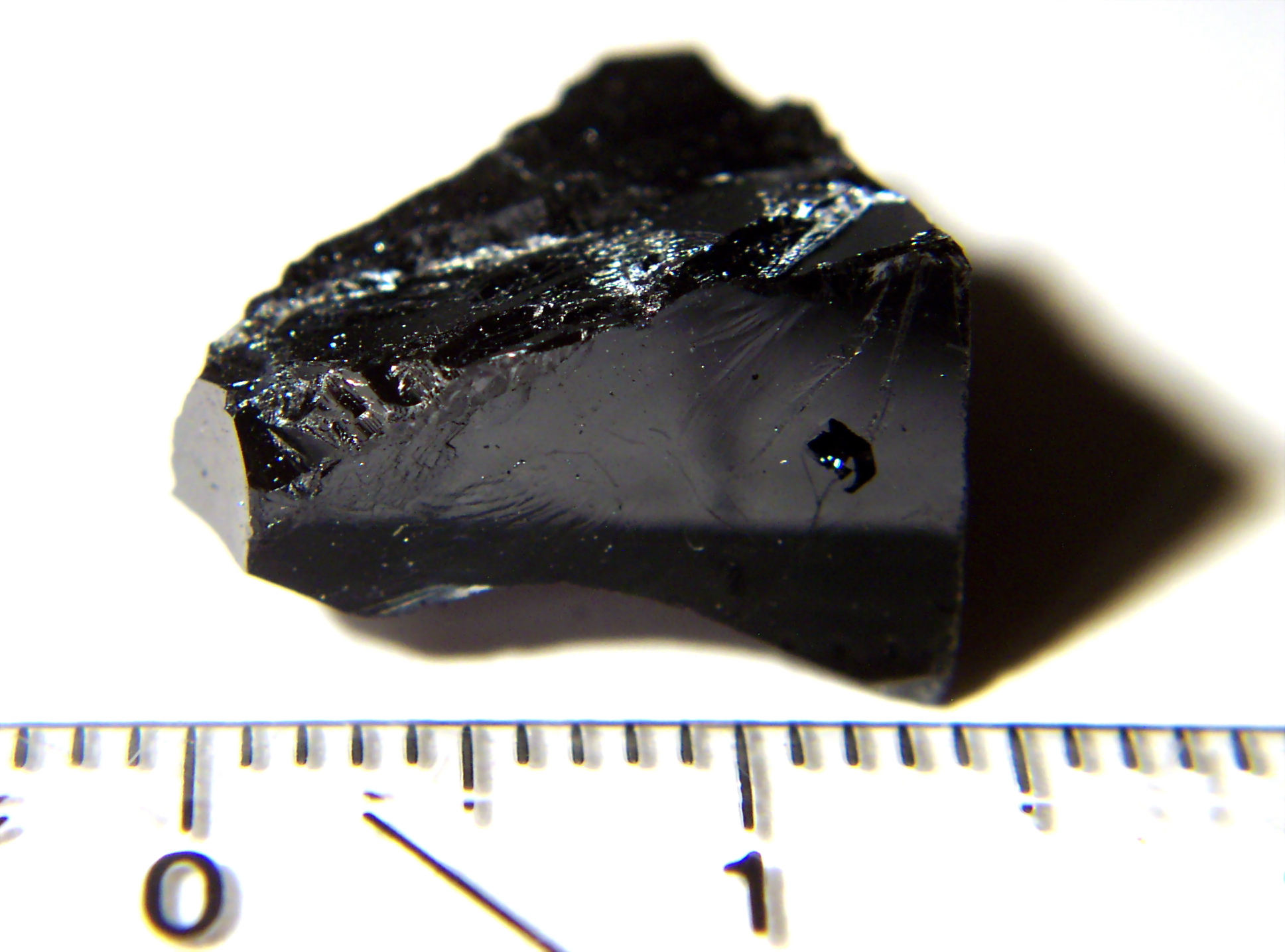
- Cadmium telluride

Names
- Other names Irtran-6

Identifiers
CAS Number	1306-25-8
3D model (JSmol)	monomer: Interactive image; crystal form: Interactive image
ChemSpider	82622
ECHA InfoCard	100.013.773
EC Number	215-149-9
PubChem CID	91501
RTECS number	EV3330000
UNII	STG188WO13
CompTox Dashboard (EPA)	DTXSID0030950
- InChI: InChI=1S/Cd.Te Key: RPPBZEBXAAZZJH-UHFFFAOYSA-N; InChI=1/Cd.Te/rCdTe/c1-2 Key: RPPBZEBXAAZZJH-UEZHWRJLAD
- SMILES: monomer: [Cd]=[Te]; crystal form: [TeH+2]12[CdH2-2][TeH+2]3[CdH2-2][TeH+2]([CdH-2]14)[CdH-2]1[Te+2]5([CdH-2]38)[Cd-2]26[TeH+2]2[CdH-2]([Te+2]4)[TeH+2]1[CdH2-2][TeH+2]3[CdH-2]2[Te+2][CdH-2]([TeH+2]6[CdH-2]([TeH+2])[TeH+2]68)[TeH+2]([CdH2-2]6)[CdH-2]35

Properties
Chemical formula	CdTe
Molar mass	240.01 g/mol
Density	5.85 g·cm^{−3}
Melting point	1,041 °C (1,906 °F; 1,314 K)
Boiling point	1,050 °C (1,920 °F; 1,320 K)
Solubility in water	insoluble
Solubility in other solvents	insoluble
Band gap	1.5 eV (@300 K, direct)
Thermal conductivity	6.2 W·m/m^{2}·K at 293 K
Refractive index (n_{D})	2.67 (@10 μm)

Structure
Crystal structure	Zinc blende
Space group	F4̅3m
Lattice constant	a = 0.648 nm

Thermochemistry
Heat capacity (C)	210 J/kg·K at 293 K

Hazards
- GHS labelling
Pictograms	(GHS07: Exclamation mark) (GHS09: Environmental hazard)
Signal word	Warning
Hazard statements	H302, H312, H332, H410, H411
Precautionary statements	P261, P264, P270, P271, P273, P280, P301+P312, P302+P352, P304+P312, P304+P340, P312, P322, P330, P363, P391, P501
- NIOSH (US health exposure limits)
PEL (Permissible)	[1910.1027] TWA 0.005 mg/m^{3} (as Cd)
REL (Recommended)	Ca
IDLH (Immediate danger)	Ca [9 mg/m^{3} (as Cd)]

Related compounds
Other anions	Cadmium oxide Cadmium sulfide Cadmium selenide
Other cations	Zinc telluride Mercury telluride
- Except where otherwise noted, data are given for materials in their standard state (at 25 °C [77 °F], 100 kPa). verify (what is ?) Infobox references

Cadmium telluride (CdTe) is a stable crystalline compound formed from cadmium and tellurium. It is mainly used as the semiconducting material in cadmium telluride photovoltaics and an infrared optical window. It is usually sandwiched with cadmium sulfide to form a p–n junction solar PV cell.

== Applications ==
CdTe is used to make thin film solar cells, accounting for about 8% of all solar cells installed in 2011. They are among the lowest-cost types of solar cell, although a comparison of total installed cost depends on installation size and many other factors, and has changed rapidly from year to year. The CdTe solar cell market is dominated by First Solar. In 2011, around 2 GW_{p} of CdTe solar cells were produced; For more details and discussion see cadmium telluride photovoltaics.

CdTe can be alloyed with mercury to make a versatile infrared detector material (HgCdTe). CdTe alloyed with a small amount of zinc makes an excellent solid-state X-ray and gamma ray detector (CdZnTe).

CdTe is used as an infrared optical material for optical windows and lenses and is proven to provide a good performance across a wide range of temperatures. An early form of CdTe for IR use was marketed under the trademarked name of Irtran-6, but this is obsolete.

CdTe is also applied for electro-optic modulators. It has the greatest electro-optic coefficient of the linear electro-optic effect among II-VI compound crystals (r_{41}=r_{52}=r_{63}=6.8×10^{−12} m/V).

CdTe doped with chlorine is used as a radiation detector for x-rays, gamma rays, beta particles and alpha particles. CdTe can operate at room temperature allowing the construction of compact detectors for a wide variety of applications in nuclear spectroscopy. The properties that make CdTe superior for the realization of high performance gamma- and x-ray detectors are high atomic number, large bandgap and high electron mobility ~1100 cm^{2}/V·s, which result in high intrinsic μτ (mobility-lifetime) product and therefore high degree of charge collection and excellent spectral resolution. Due to the poor charge transport properties of holes, ~100 cm^{2}/V·s, single-carrier-sensing detector geometries are used to produce high resolution spectroscopy; these include coplanar grids, Frisch-collar detectors and small pixel detectors.

== Physical properties ==
- Thermal expansion coefficient: 5.9×10^{−6}/K at 293 K
- Young's modulus: 52 GPa
- Poisson ratio: 0.41

=== Optical and electronic properties ===
Fluorescence spectra of colloidal CdTe quantum dots of various sizes, increasing approximately from 2 to 20 nm from left to right. The blue shift of fluorescence is due to quantum confinement.

Bulk CdTe is transparent in the infrared, from close to its band gap energy (1.5 eV at 300 K, which corresponds to infrared wavelength of about 830 nm) out to wavelengths greater than 20 μm; correspondingly, CdTe is fluorescent at 790 nm. As the size of CdTe crystals are reduced to a few nanometers or less, thus making them CdTe quantum dots, the fluorescence peak shifts through the visible range into the ultraviolet.

== Chemical properties ==
CdTe is insoluble in water. CdTe has a high melting point of 1,041 °C (1,906 °F) with evaporation starting at 1,050 °C (1,920 °F). CdTe has a vapor pressure of zero at ambient temperatures. CdTe is more stable than its parent compounds cadmium and tellurium and most other Cd compounds, due to its high melting point and insolubility.

Cadmium telluride is commercially available as a powder, or as crystals. It can be made into nanocrystals.

== Toxicology assessment ==
The compound CdTe has different qualities than the two elements, cadmium and tellurium, taken separately. CdTe has low acute inhalation, oral, and aquatic toxicity, and is negative in the Ames mutagenicity test. Based on notification of these results to the European Chemicals Agency (ECHA), CdTe is no longer classified as harmful if ingested nor harmful in contact with skin, and the toxicity classification to aquatic life has been reduced. Once properly and securely captured and encapsulated, CdTe used in manufacturing processes may be rendered harmless. Current CdTe modules pass the U.S. EPA's Toxicity Characteristic Leaching Procedure (TCLP) test, designed to assess the potential for long-term leaching of products disposed in landfills.

A document hosted by the U.S. National Institutes of Health dated 2003 discloses the following:

Brookhaven National Laboratory (BNL) and the U.S. Department of Energy (DOE) are nominating Cadmium Telluride (CdTe) for inclusion in the National Toxicology Program (NTP). This nomination is strongly supported by the National Renewable Energy Laboratory (NREL) and First Solar Inc. The material has the potential for widespread applications in photovoltaic energy generation that will involve extensive human interfaces. Hence, we consider that a definitive toxicological study of the effects of long-term exposure to CdTe is a necessity.

According to the classification provided by companies to the European Chemicals Agency (ECHA) in REACH registrations, it is still harmful to aquatic life with long lasting effects.

Additionally, the classification provided by companies to ECHA notifications classifies it as very toxic to aquatic life with long lasting effects, very toxic to aquatic life, harmful if inhaled or swallowed and is harmful in contact with skin.

== Availability ==
At the present time, the prices of the raw materials cadmium and tellurium are a negligible proportion of the cost of CdTe solar cells and other CdTe devices. However, tellurium is a relatively rare element (1–5 parts per billion in the Earth's crust; see Abundances of the elements (data page)). Through improved material efficiency and increased PV recycling systems, the CdTe PV industry has the potential to fully rely on tellurium from recycled end-of-life modules by 2038. Another study shows that CdTe PV recycling will add a significant secondary resource of Te which, in conjunction with improved material utilization, will enable a cumulative capacity of about 2 TW by 2050 and 10 TW by the end of the century.

== See also ==
- Cadmium selenide
- Cadmium telluride photovoltaics
- Cadmium zinc telluride
- First Solar
- Mercury telluride
- Mercury(II) cadmium(II) telluride
- Zinc telluride
