= Lazarus effect =

Phenomena in semiconductor detectors

Lattice defect creation mechanism (top) and trapping/de-trapping of electrons and holes at different temperatures (bottom)

The Lazarus effect refers to semiconductor detectors; when these are used in harsh radiation environments, defects begin to appear in the semiconductor crystal lattice as atoms become displaced because of the interaction with the high-energy traversing particles. These defects, in the form of both lattice vacancies and atoms at interstitial sites, have the effect of temporarily trapping the electrons and holes which are created when ionizing particles pass through the detector. Since it is these electrons and holes drifting in an electric field which produce a signal that announces the passage of a particle, when large amounts of defects are produced, the detector signal can be strongly reduced leading to an unusable (dead) detector.

Radiation damage produced by relativistic lead ions from the SPS beam hitting a silicon microstrip detector of the NA50 experiment at CERN

However in 1997, Vittorio Giulio Palmieri, Kurt Borer, Stefan Janos, Cinzia Da Viá and Luca Casagrande at the University of Bern (Switzerland) found out that at temperatures below 130 kelvins (about −143 degrees Celsius), dead detectors apparently come back to life. The explanation of this phenomenon, known as the Lazarus effect, is related to the dynamics of the induced defects in the semiconductor bulk.

At room temperature radiation damage induced defects temporarily trap electrons and holes resulting from ionization, which are then emitted back to the conduction band or valence band in a time that is typically longer than the read-out time of the connected electronics. Consequently the measured signal is smaller than it should be. This leads to low signal-to-noise ratios that in turn can prevent the detection of the traversing particle. At cryogenic temperatures, however, once an electron or hole, resulting from ionization or from detector leakage current, is trapped in a local defect, it remains trapped for a long time due to the very low thermal energy of the lattice. This leads to a large fraction of 'traps' becoming filled and therefore inactive. Trapping of electrons and holes generated by particles traversing the detector is then prevented and little or no signal is lost. Such behaviour has been observed in a number of scientific papers.

Thanks to the Lazarus effect, silicon detectors have been proven to be able survive radiation doses in excess of 90 GRad and they have been proposed for future high luminosity experiments. A scientific collaboration RD39 has been established at CERN to fully understand the details of the physics involved in the phenomenon.

Recently, the Lazarus effect has been proposed as the mechanism providing enhanced radiation hardness for high energy silicon alpha and beta voltaic devices operated at cryogenic temperatures. This could lead to devices based on Strontium-90 radioisotope, which is much cheaper than Nickel-63 currently used in diamond nuclear batteries. Such devices could be useful for deep space exploration.
