= Shockley–Ramo theorem =

The Shockley–Ramo theorem is a method for calculating the electric current induced by a charge moving in the vicinity of an electrode. Previously named simply the "Ramo Theorem", the modified name was introduced by D.S. McGregor et al. in 1998 to recognize the contributions of both Shockley and Ramo to understanding the influence of mobile charges in a radiation detector. The theorem appeared in William Shockley's 1938 paper titled "Currents to Conductors Induced by a Moving Point Charge" and in Simon Ramo's 1939 paper titled "Currents Induced by Electron Motion". It is based on the concept that the current induced in the electrode is due to the instantaneous change of electrostatic flux lines that end on the electrode, rather than the amount of charge received by the electrode per second (net charge flow rate).

The Shockley–Ramo theorem states that the instantaneous current $i$ induced on a given electrode due to the motion of a charge is given by:

$$i = E_v q v$$

where

$q$ is the charge of the particle;

$v$ is its instantaneous velocity; and

$E_v$ is the component of the electric field in the direction of $v$ at the charge's instantaneous position, under the following conditions: charge removed, given electrode raised to unit potential, and all other conductors grounded.

The theorem has been applied to a wide variety of applications and fields, including semiconductor radiation detection, calculations of charge movement in proteins., or the detection of moving ions in vacuum for mass spectrometry or ion implantation.
