= Compton telescope =

Gamma ray detector

Working principle of a Compton camera

A Compton telescope (also known as a Compton camera or Compton imager) is a gamma-ray detector which utilizes Compton scattering to determine the origin of the observed gamma rays.

Compton cameras are usually applied to detect gamma rays in the energy range where Compton scattering is the dominating interaction process, from a few hundred keV to several MeV. They are applied in fields such as astrophysics, nuclear medicine, and nuclear threat detection.

== Principle of operation ==
The Compton telescope consists of two layers of Compton scattering detectors spaced apart (1.5 m in the case of COMPTEL). A Compton scattering event results in an electron and a photon. Each layer detects the position of an event and the energy of an electron resulting from the Compton event. In addition, the time between events in the upper and lower layers is measured. When the time between two events matches the time it takes for the photon to travel from the upper to lower level, the events are accepted for an image. The direction of the original gamma ray is unknown but the angle of the second photon and the energies of the two electrons allow the angle between the first and second photons to be calculated. Thus each event gives a cone of possible sources for the first photon. After many events are added the overlap of their cones gives the source direction.

== Astrophysics missions ==
The COMPTEL aboard the Compton Gamma Ray Observatory observed of the gamma-ray sky in the energy range between 0.75 and 30 MeV between its launch in April 1991 and intensional deorbit in June 2000. Among the results was a detailed study of the Crab pulsar.

A successor mission, the balloon-borne Nuclear Compton Telescope, flew a successful run in 2005. It provided a gamma-ray based image of the Crab pulsar.
