= Phonon noise =

Random energy exchange from thermal masses

Phonon noise, also known as thermal fluctuation noise, arises from the random exchange of energy between a thermal mass and its surrounding environment. This energy is quantized in the form of phonons. Each phonon has an energy of order $k_\text{B}T$, where $k_\text{B}$ is the Boltzmann constant and $T$ is the temperature. The random exchange of energy leads to fluctuations in temperature. This occurs even when the thermal mass and the environment are in thermal equilibrium, i.e. at the same time-average temperature. If a device has a temperature-dependent electrical resistance, then these fluctuations in temperature lead to fluctuations in resistance. Examples of devices where phonon noise is important include bolometers and calorimeters. The superconducting transition edge sensor (TES), which can be operated either as a bolometer or a calorimeter, is an example of a device for which phonon noise can significantly contribute to the total noise.

Although Johnson–Nyquist noise shares many similarities with phonon noise (e.g. the noise spectral density depends on the temperature and is white at low frequencies), these two noise sources are distinct. Johnson–Nyquist noise arises from the random thermal motion of electrons, whereas phonon noise arises from the random exchange of phonons. Johnson–Nyquist noise is easily modeled at thermal equilibrium, where all components of the circuit are held at the same temperature. A general equilibrium model for phonon noise is usually impossible because different components of the thermal circuit are nonuniform in temperature and also often not time invariant, as in the occasional energy deposition from particles incident on a detector. The transition edge sensor typically maintains the temperature through negative electrothermal feedback associated with changes in internal electrical power.

An approximate formula for the noise-equivalent power (NEP) due to phonon noise in a bolometer when all components are very close to a temperature T is

$$\ NEP = \sqrt{4 k_\text{B} T^2 G},$$

where G is the thermal conductance and the NEP is measured in $\mathrm{W/\sqrt{Hz}}$. In calorimetric detectors, the rms energy resolution $\delta E$ due to phonon noise near quasi-equilibrium is described using a similar formula,

$$\ \delta E = \sqrt{k_\text{B} T^2 C},$$

where C is the heat capacity.

A real bolometer or calorimeter is not at equilibrium because of a temperature gradient between the absorber and the bath. Since G and C are generally nonlinear functions of temperature, a more advanced model may include the temperature of both the absorber and the bath and treat G or C as a power law across this temperature range.

== See also ==
- Thermal fluctuations
