= Wilkinson Microwave Anisotropy Probe =

NASA satellite of the Explorer program (2001-2010)

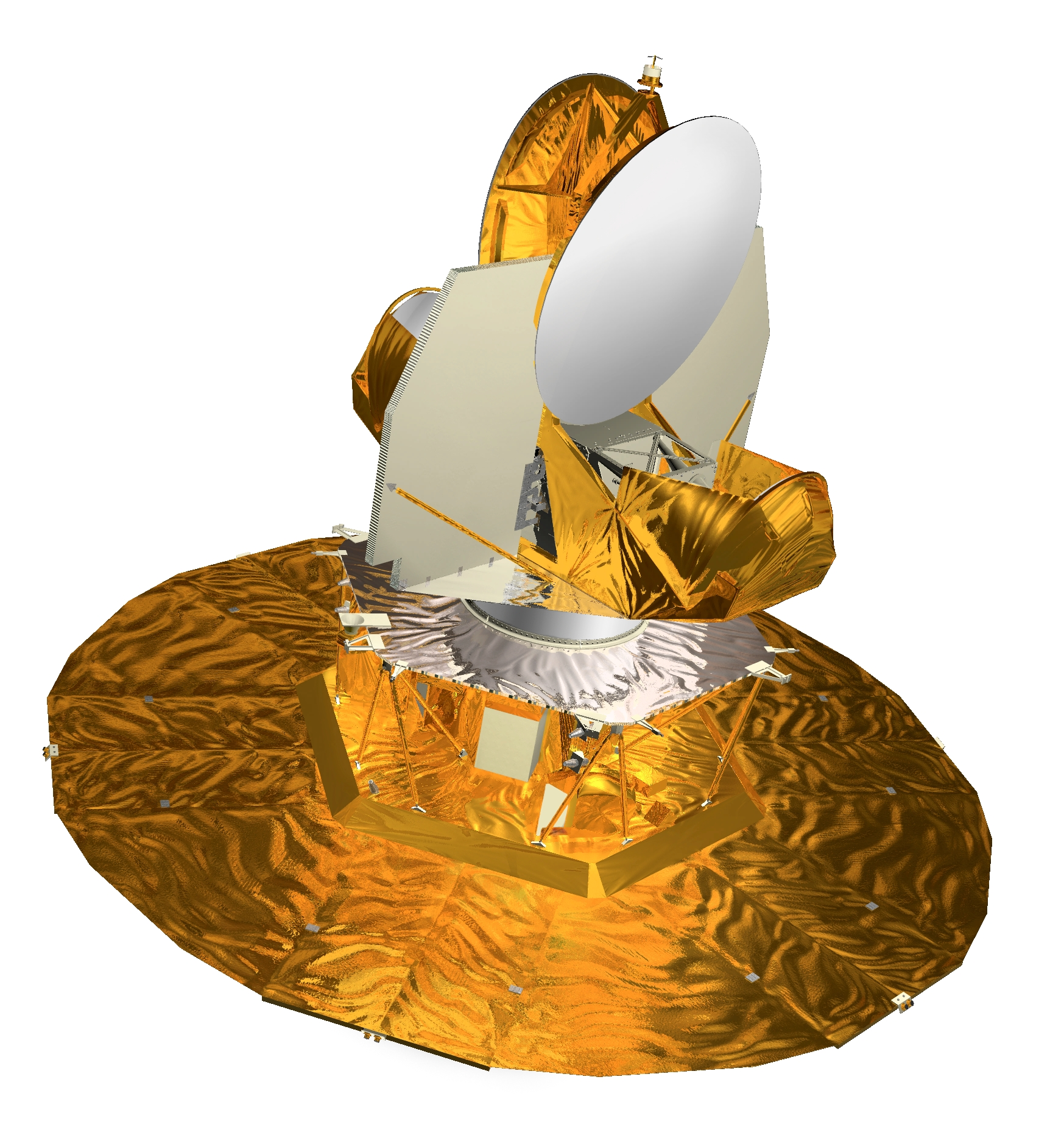
- Wilkinson Microwave Anisotropy Probe (WMAP) satellite
- Names: Explorer 80; MAP; Microwave Anisotropy Probe; MIDEX-2; WMAP
- Mission type: Cosmic microwave background Astronomy
- Operator: NASA
- COSPAR ID: 2001-027A
- SATCAT no.: 26859
- Website: http://map.gsfc.nasa.gov/
- Mission duration: 27 months (planned); 9 years (achieved)

Spacecraft properties
- Spacecraft: Explorer LXXX
- Spacecraft type: Wilkinson Microwave Anisotropy Probe
- Bus: WMAP
- Manufacturer: NRAO
- Launch mass: 840 kg (1,850 lb)
- Dry mass: 763 kg (1,682 lb)
- Dimensions: 3.6 × 5.1 m (12 × 17 ft)
- Power: 419 watts

Start of mission
- Launch date: 30 June 2001, 19:46:46 UTC
- Rocket: Delta II 7425-10 (Delta 246)
- Launch site: Cape Canaveral, SLC-17B
- Contractor: Boeing Launch Services
- Entered service: 1 October 2001

End of mission
- Disposal: Graveyard orbit
- Deactivated: 20 October 2010
- Last contact: 19 August 2010

Orbital parameters
- Reference system: Sun-Earth L_{2} orbit
- Regime: Lissajous orbit

Main telescope
- Type: Gregorian
- Diameter: 1.4 × 1.6 m (4 ft 7 in × 5 ft 3 in)
- Wavelengths: 23 GHz to 94 GHz

Instruments
- Pseudo-Correlation Radiometer
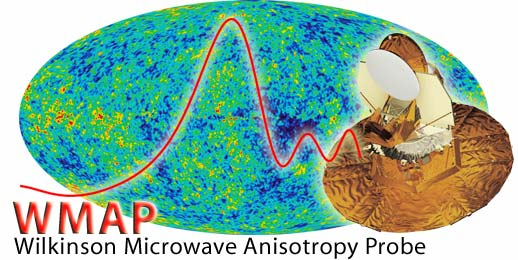
- Wilkinson Microwave Anisotropy Probe mission patch Explorer program

The Wilkinson Microwave Anisotropy Probe (WMAP), originally known as the Microwave Anisotropy Probe (MAP and Explorer 80), was a NASA spacecraft operating from 2001 to 2010 which measured temperature differences across the sky in the cosmic microwave background (CMB) – the radiant heat remaining from the Big Bang. Headed by Professor Charles L. Bennett of Johns Hopkins University, the mission was developed in a joint partnership between the NASA Goddard Space Flight Center and Princeton University. The WMAP spacecraft was launched on 30 June 2001 from Florida. The WMAP mission succeeded the COBE space mission and was the second medium-class (MIDEX) spacecraft in the NASA Explorers Program. In 2003, MAP was renamed WMAP in honor of cosmologist David Todd Wilkinson (1935–2002), who had been a member of the mission's science team. After nine years of operations, WMAP was switched off in 2010, following the launch of the more advanced Planck spacecraft by the European Space Agency (ESA) in 2009.

WMAP's measurements played a key role in establishing the current Standard Model of Cosmology: the Lambda-CDM model. The WMAP data are very well fit by a universe that is dominated by dark energy in the form of a cosmological constant. Other cosmological data are also consistent, and together tightly constrain the Model. In the Lambda-CDM model of the universe, the age of the universe is 13.772±0.059 billion years. The WMAP mission's determination of the age of the universe is to better than 1% precision. The current expansion rate of the universe is (see Hubble constant) 69.32±0.80 km·s^{−1}·Mpc^{−1}. The content of the universe currently consists of 4.628%±0.093% ordinary baryonic matter; 24.02%+0.88%
−0.87% cold dark matter (CDM) that neither emits nor absorbs light; and 71.35%+0.95%
−0.96% of dark energy in the form of a cosmological constant that accelerates the expansion of the universe. Less than 1% of the current content of the universe is in neutrinos, but WMAP's measurements have found, for the first time in 2008, that the data prefer the existence of a cosmic neutrino background with an effective number of neutrino species of 3.26±0.35. The contents point to a Euclidean flat geometry, with curvature ($\Omega_{k}$) of −0.0027+0.0039
−0.0038. The WMAP measurements also support the cosmic inflation paradigm in several ways, including the flatness measurement.

The mission has won various awards: according to Science magazine, the WMAP was the Breakthrough of the Year for 2003. This mission's results papers were first and second in the "Super Hot Papers in Science Since 2003" list. Of the all-time most referenced papers in physics and astronomy in the INSPIRE-HEP database, only three have been published since 2000, and all three are WMAP publications. Bennett, Lyman A. Page Jr., and David N. Spergel, the latter both of Princeton University, shared the 2010 Shaw Prize in astronomy for their work on WMAP. Bennett and the WMAP science team were awarded the 2012 Gruber Prize in cosmology. The 2018 Breakthrough Prize in Fundamental Physics was awarded to Bennett, Gary Hinshaw, Norman Jarosik, Page, Spergel, and the WMAP science team. The 2019 Cocconi Prize of the European Physical Society was awarded to the WMAP collaboration (jointly with the Plank Collaboration).

In October 2010, the WMAP spacecraft was derelict in a heliocentric graveyard orbit after completing nine years of operations. All WMAP data are released to the public and have been subject to careful scrutiny. The final official data release was the nine-year release in 2012.

Some aspects of the data are statistically unusual for the Standard Model of Cosmology. For example, the largest angular-scale measurement, the quadrupole moment, is somewhat smaller than the Model would predict, but this discrepancy is not highly significant. A large cold spot and other features of the data are more statistically significant, and research continues into these.

== Objectives ==
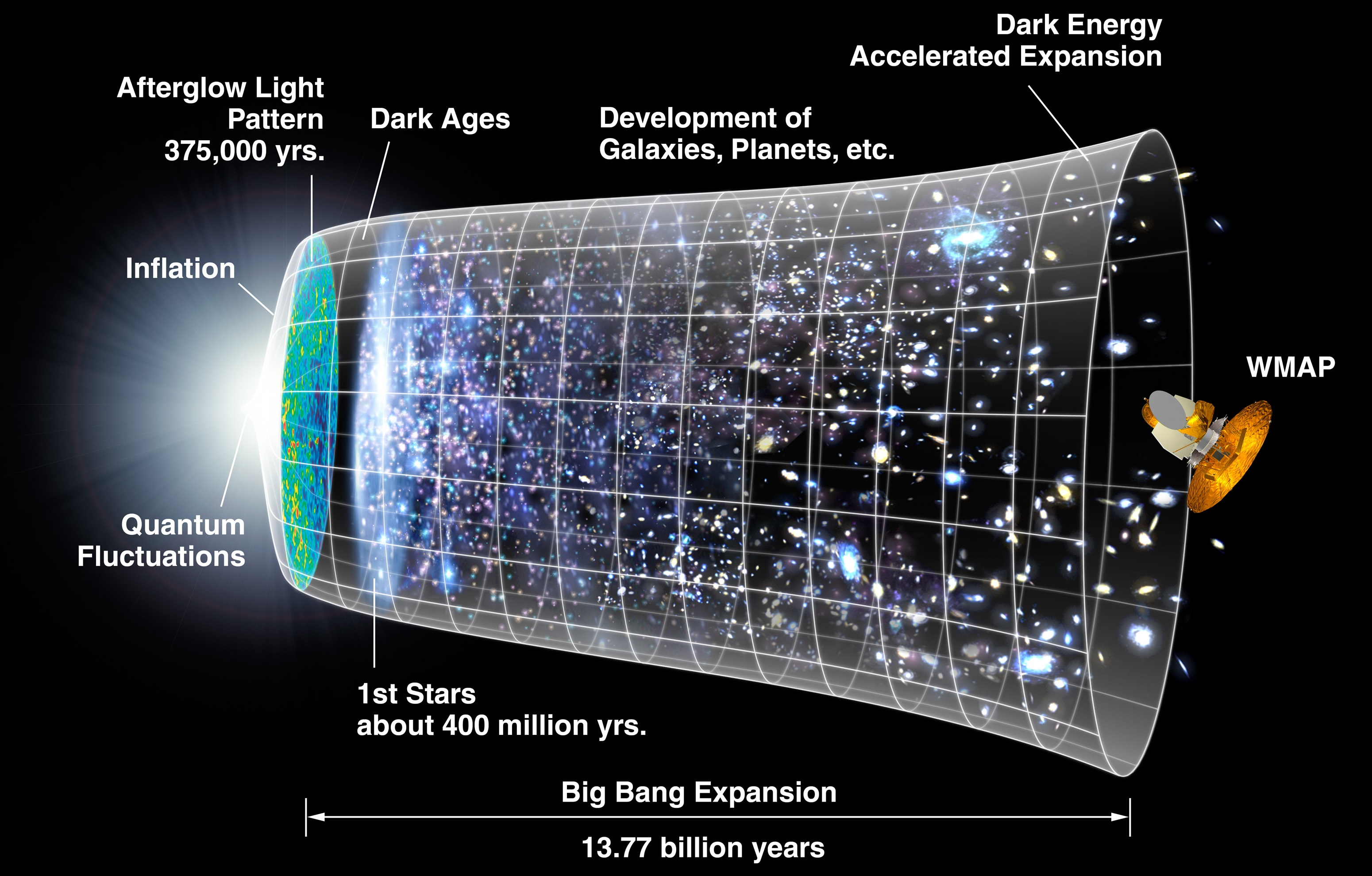
The universe's timeline, from the Big Bang to the WMAP

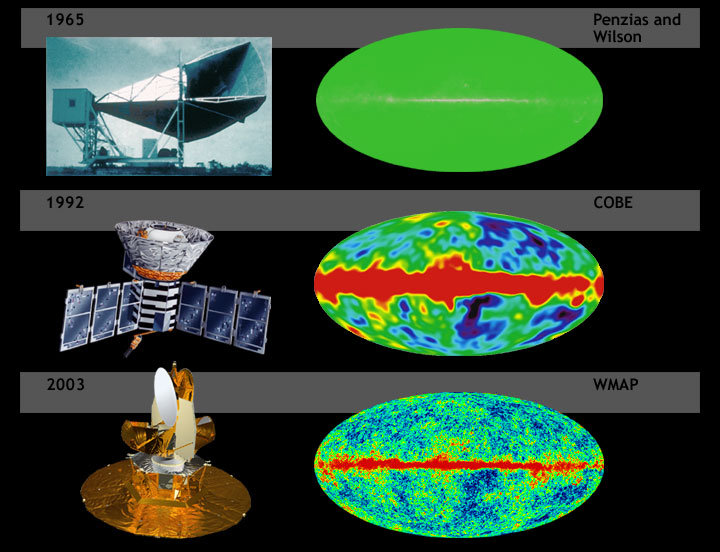
A comparison of the sensitivity of WMAP with COBE and Penzias and Wilson's telescope (simulated data)

The WMAP objective was to measure the temperature differences in the Cosmic Microwave Background (CMB) radiation. The anisotropies then were used to measure the universe's geometry, content, and evolution; and to test the Big Bang model, and the cosmic inflation theory. For that, the mission created a full-sky map of the CMB, with a 13 arcminutes resolution via multi-frequency observation. The map required the fewest systematic errors, no correlated pixel noise, and accurate calibration, to ensure angular-scale accuracy greater than its resolution. The map contains 3,145,728 pixels, and uses the HEALPix scheme to pixelize the sphere. The telescope also measured the CMB's E-mode polarization, and foreground polarization. Its service life expectation was set at 27 months: 3 to reach the L_{2} position, and 2 years of observation.

== Development ==
The MAP mission was proposed to NASA in 1995, selected for definition study in 1996, and approved for development in 1997.

The WMAP was preceded by two missions to observe the CMB; (i) the Soviet RELIKT-1 that reported the upper-limit measurements of CMB anisotropies, and (ii) the U.S. COBE satellite that first reported large-scale CMB fluctuations. The WMAP was 45 times more sensitive, with 33 times the angular resolution of its COBE satellite predecessor. The successor European Planck mission (operational 2009–2013) had a higher resolution and higher sensitivity than WMAP and observed in 9 frequency bands rather than WMAP's 5, allowing improved astrophysical foreground models.

== Spacecraft ==
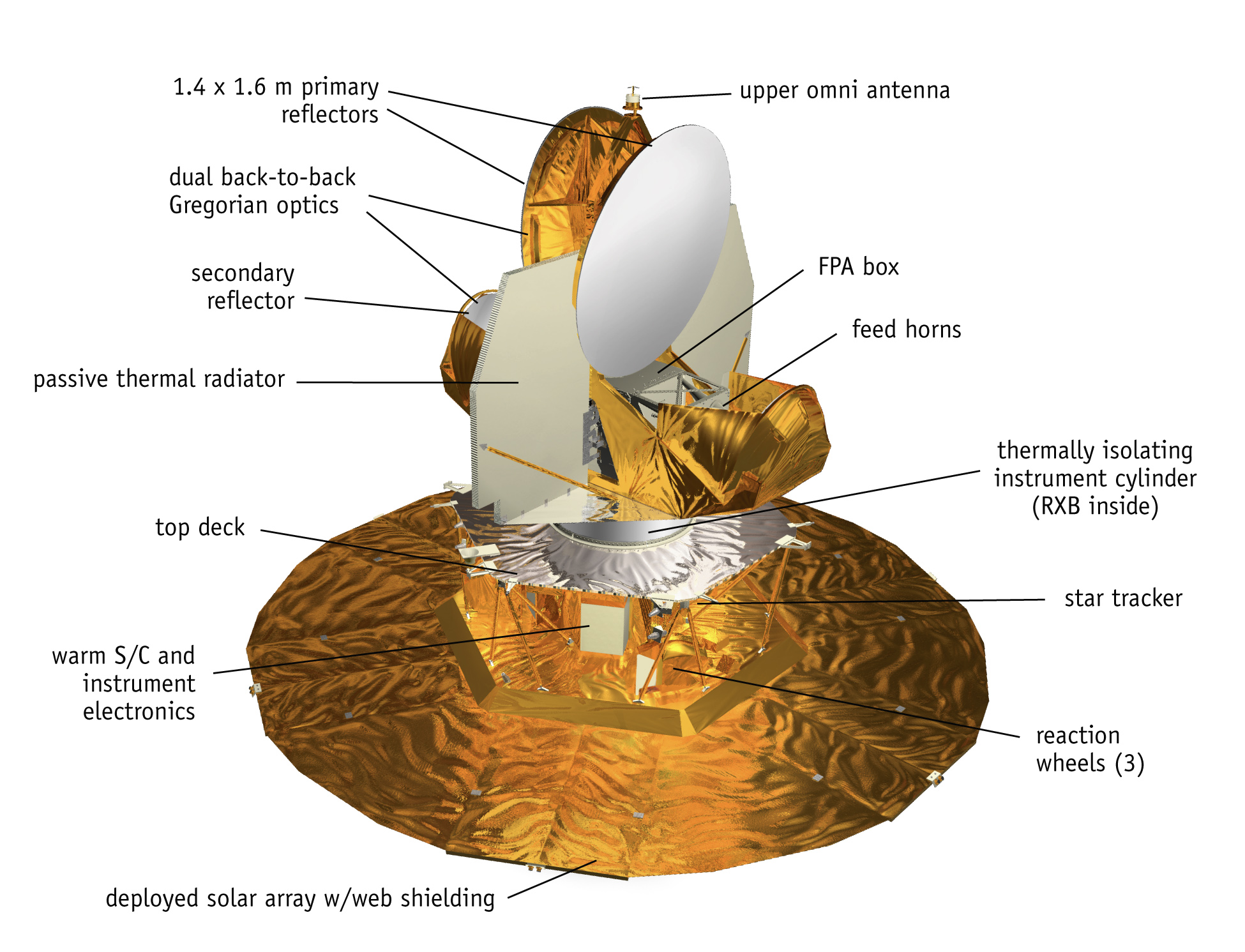
WMAP spacecraft diagram

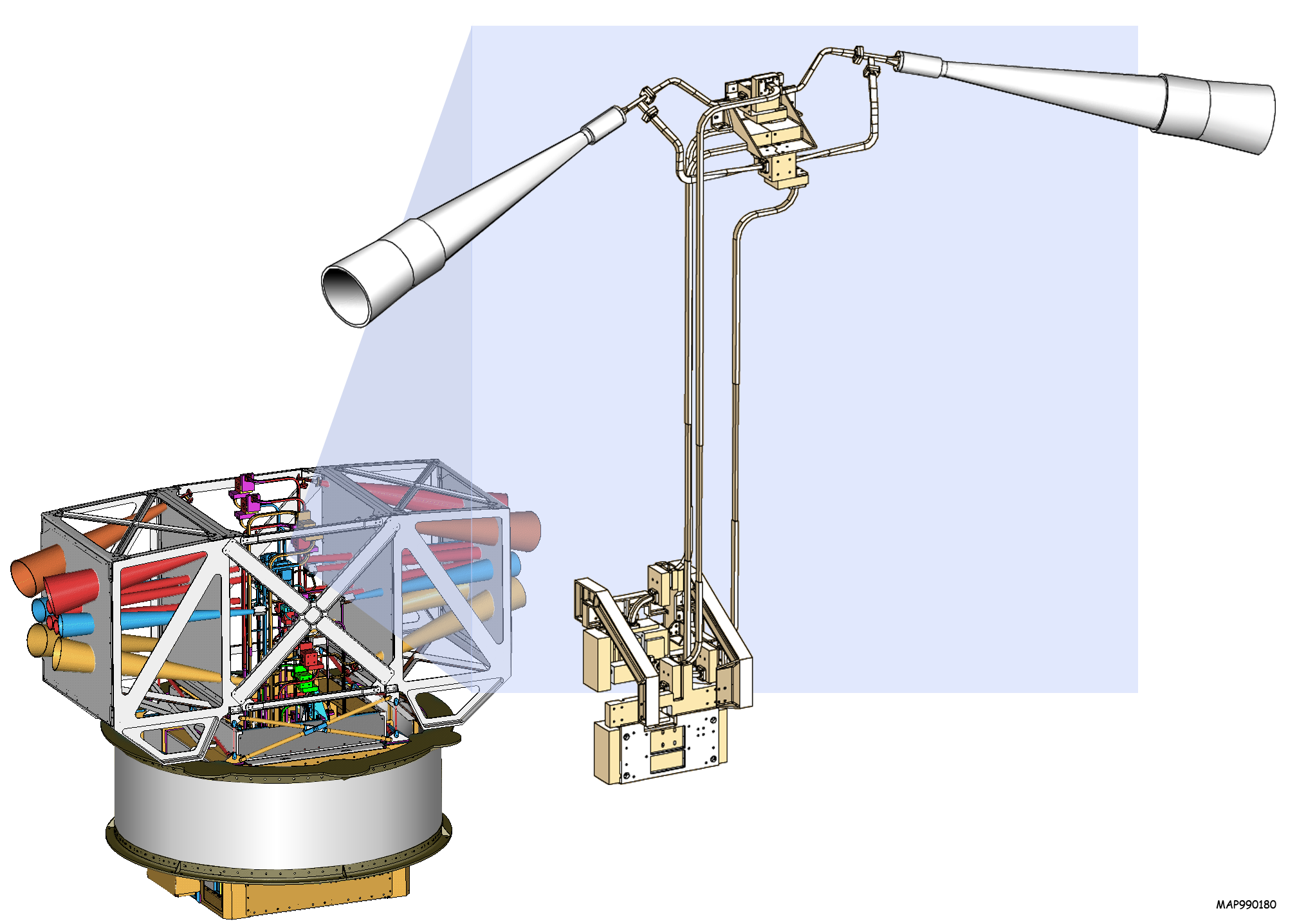
Illustration of WMAP's receivers

The telescope's primary reflecting mirrors are a pair of Gregorian 1.4 × 1.6 m (4 ft 7 in × 5 ft 3 in) dishes (facing opposite directions), that focus the signal onto a pair of 0.9 × 1.0 m (2 ft 11 in × 3 ft 3 in) secondary reflecting mirrors. They are shaped for optimal performance: a carbon fibre shell upon a Korex core, thinly-coated with aluminium and silicon oxide. The secondary reflectors transmit the signals to the corrugated feedhorns that sit on a focal plane array box beneath the primary reflectors.

The receivers are polarization-sensitive differential radiometers measuring the difference between two telescope beams. The signal is amplified with High-electron-mobility transistor (HEMT) low-noise amplifiers, built by the National Radio Astronomy Observatory (NRAO). There are 20 feeds, 10 in each direction, from which a radiometer collects a signal; the measure is the difference in the sky signal from opposite directions. The directional separation azimuth is 180°; the total angle is 141°. To improve subtraction of foreground signals from our Milky Way galaxy, the WMAP used five discrete radio frequency bands, from 23 GHz to 94 GHz.

Properties of WMAP at different frequencies
Property	K-band	Ka-band	Q-band	V-band	W-band
Central wavelength (mm)	13	9.1	7.3	4.9	3.2
Central frequency (GHz)	23	33	41	61	94
Bandwidth (GHz)	5.5	7.0	8.3	14.0	20.5
Beam size (arcminutes)	52.8	39.6	30.6	21	13.2
Number of radiometers	2	2	4	4	8
System temperature (K)	29	39	59	92	145
Sensitivity (mK s$^{1/2}$)	0.8	0.8	1.0	1.2	1.6

The WMAP's base is a 5.0 m (16.4 ft)-diameter solar panel array that keeps the instruments in shadow during CMB observations, (by keeping the craft constantly angled at 22°, relative to the Sun). Upon the array sit a bottom deck (supporting the warm components) and a top deck. The telescope's cold components: the focal-plane array and the mirrors, are separated from the warm components with a cylindrical, 33 cm (13 in)-long thermal isolation shell atop the deck.

Passive thermal radiators cool the WMAP to approximately 90 K (−183.2 °C; −297.7 °F); they are connected to the low-noise amplifiers. The telescope consumes 419 W of power. The available telescope heaters are emergency-survival heaters, and there is a transmitter heater, used to warm them when off. The WMAP spacecraft's temperature is monitored with platinum resistance thermometers.

The WMAP's calibration is effected with the CMB dipole and measurements of Jupiter; the beam patterns are measured against Jupiter. The telescope's data are relayed daily via a 2-GHz transponder providing a 667 kbit/s downlink to a 70 m (230 ft) Deep Space Network station. The spacecraft has two transponders, one a redundant backup; they are minimally active – about 40 minutes daily – to minimize radio frequency interference. The telescope's position is maintained, in its three axes, with three reaction wheels, gyroscopes, two star trackers and Sun sensors, and is steered with eight hydrazine thrusters.

== Launch, trajectory, and orbit ==
Animation of WMAP's trajectory

Oblique view

Viewed from Earth

Earth · WMAP

The WMAP spacecraft arrived at the Kennedy Space Center on 20 April 2001. After being tested for two months, it was launched via Delta II 7425 launch vehicle from the Cape Canaveral Space Force Station on 30 June 2001. It began operating on its internal power five minutes before its launching, and continued so operating until the solar panel array deployed. The WMAP was activated and monitored while it cooled. On 2 July 2001, it began working, first with in-flight testing (from launching until 17 August 2001), then began constant, formal work. Afterwards, it effected three Earth-Moon phase loops, measuring its sidelobes, then flew by the Moon on 30 July 2001, en route to the Sun-Earth L_{2} Lagrange point, arriving there on 1 October 2001, becoming the first CMB observation mission posted there.

Locating the spacecraft at Lagrange 2, (1,500,000 km (930,000 mi) from Earth) thermally stabilized it and minimized the contaminating solar, terrestrial, and lunar emissions registered. To view the entire sky, without looking to the Sun, the WMAP traced a path around L_{2} in a Lissajous orbit ca. 1.0° to 10°, with a 6-month period. The telescope rotated once every 2 minutes 9 seconds (0.464 rpm) and precesses at the rate of 1 revolution per hour. WMAP measured the entire sky every six months, and completed its first, full-sky observation in April 2002.

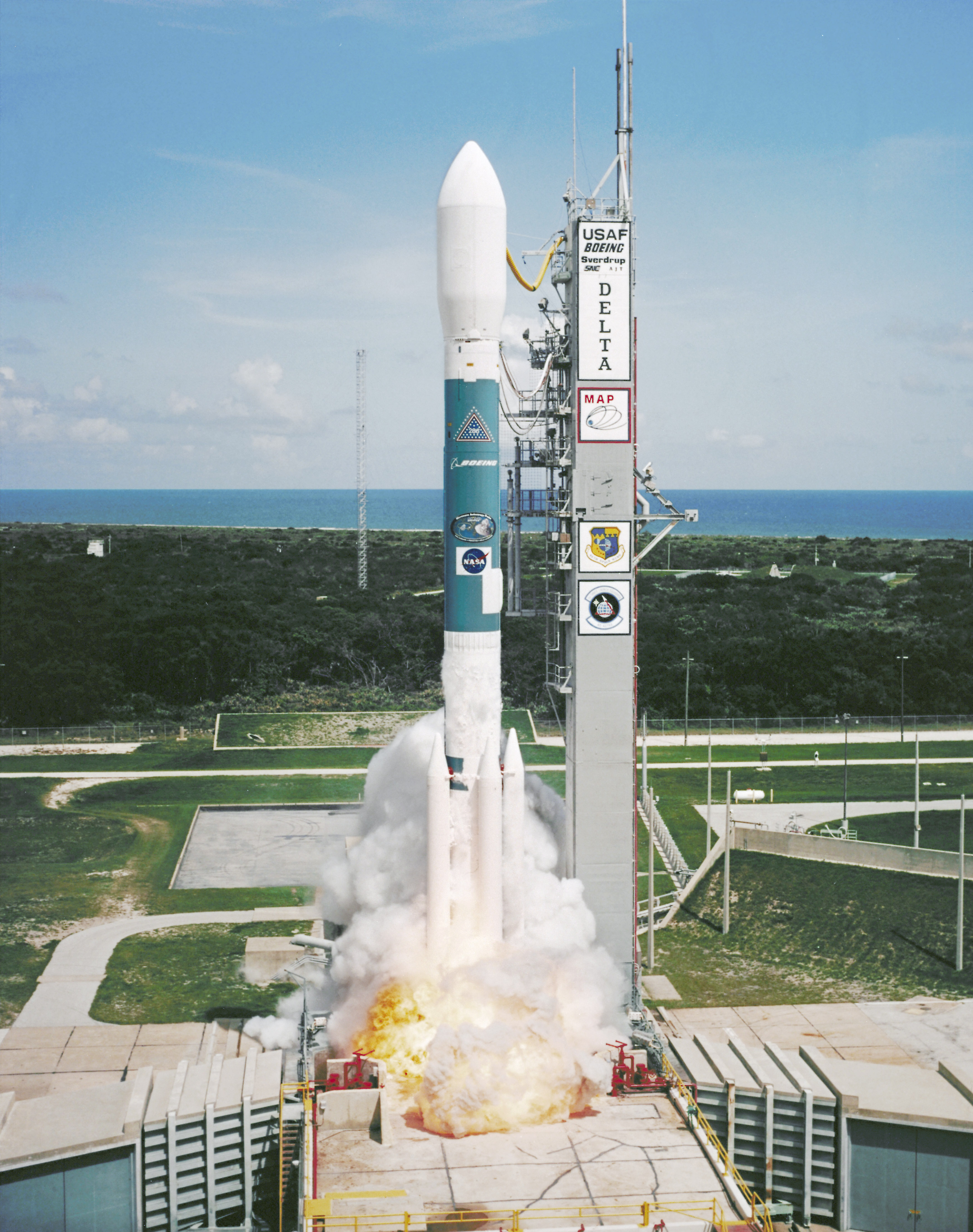
WMAP launches from Cape Canaveral Air Force Station, 30 June 2001

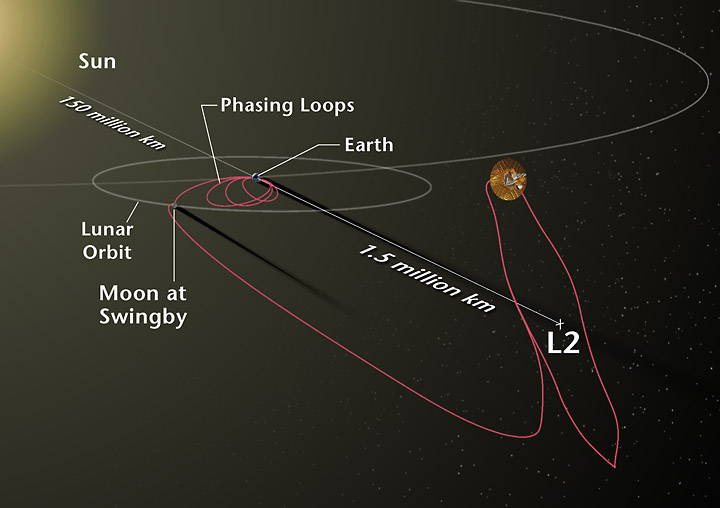
The WMAP's trajectory and orbit

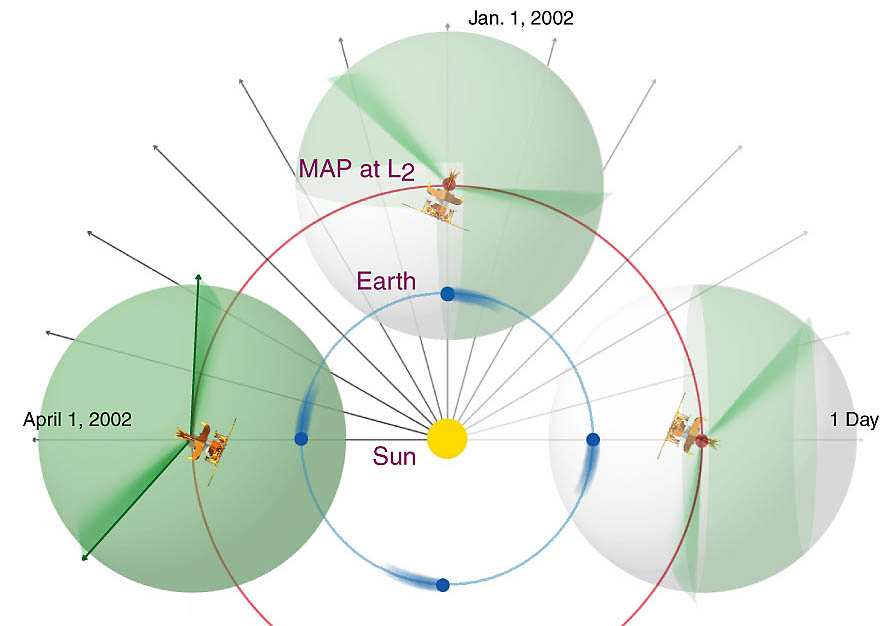
WMAP's orbit and sky scan strategy

== Experiment ==
=== Pseudo-correlation radiometer ===
The WMAP instrument consists of pseudo-correlation differential radiometers fed by two back-to-back 1.5 m (4 ft 11 in) primary Gregorian reflectors. This instrument uses five frequency bands from 22 GHz to 90 GHz to facilitate rejection of foreground signals from our own Galaxy. The WMAP instrument has a 3.5° × 3.5° field of view (FoV).

== Foreground radiation subtraction ==
The WMAP observed in five frequencies, permitting the measurement and subtraction of foreground contamination (from the Milky Way and extra-galactic sources) of the CMB. The main emission mechanisms are synchrotron radiation and free-free emission (dominating the lower frequencies), and astrophysical dust emissions (dominating the higher frequencies). The spectral properties of these emissions contribute different amounts to the five frequencies, thus permitting their identification and subtraction.

Foreground contamination is removed in several ways. First, subtract extant emission maps from the WMAP's measurements; second, use the components' known spectral values to identify them; third, simultaneously fit the position and spectra data of the foreground emission, using extra data sets. Foreground contamination was reduced by using only the full-sky map portions with the least foreground contamination, while masking the remaining map portions.

The five-year models of foreground emission, at different frequencies. Red = Synchrotron; Green = free-free; Blue = thermal dust.
23-GHz	33-GHz	41-GHz	61-GHz	94-GHz
23 GHz	33 GHz	41 GHz	61 GHz	94 GHz

== Measurements and discoveries ==
=== One-year data release ===
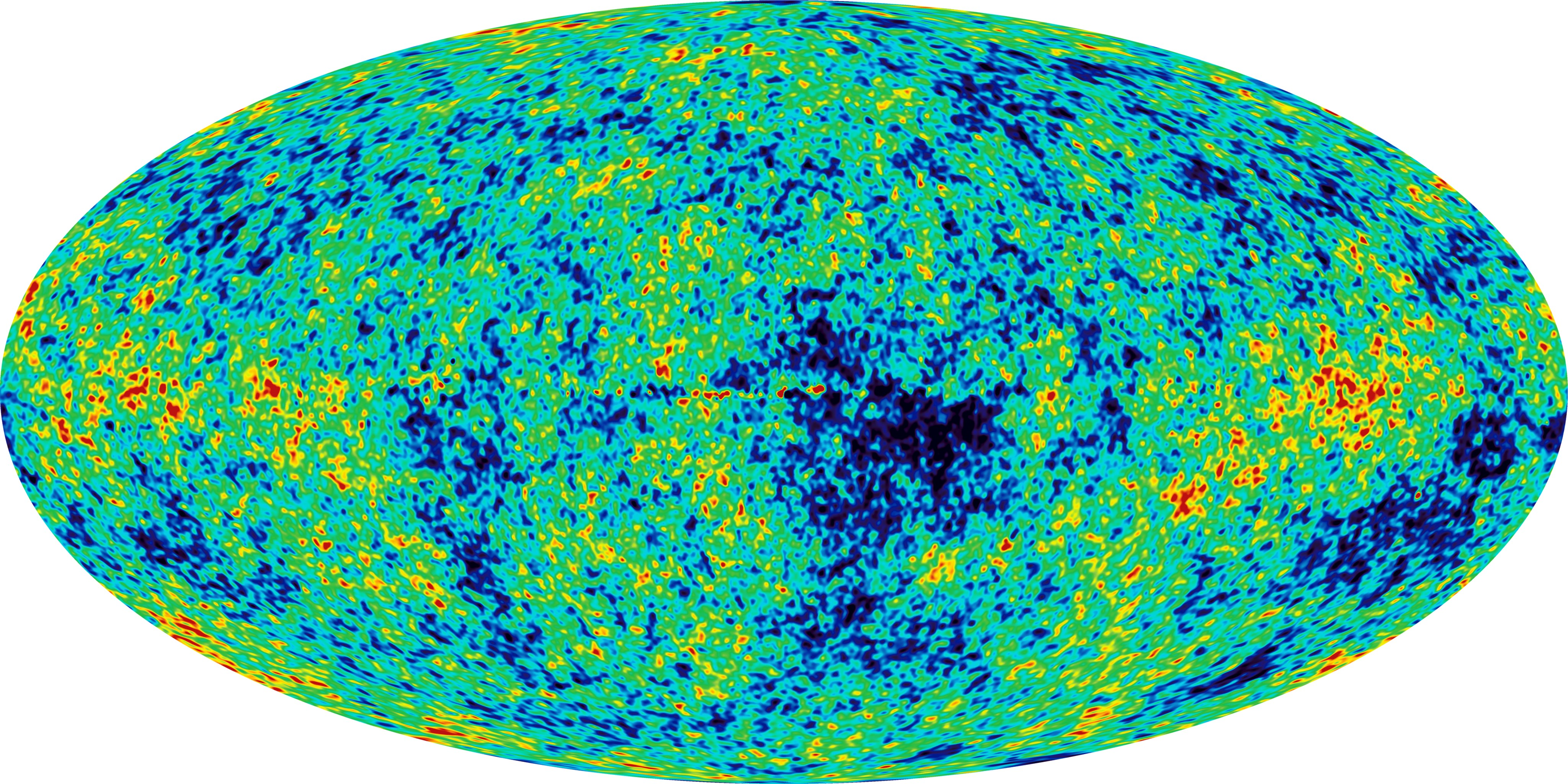
One-year WMAP image of background cosmic radiation (2003)

On 11 February 2003, NASA published the first-year's worth of WMAP data. The latest calculated age and composition of the early universe were presented. In addition, an image of the early universe, that "contains such stunning detail, that it may be one of the most important scientific results of recent years" was presented. The newly released data surpass previous CMB measurements.

Based upon the Lambda-CDM model, the WMAP team produced cosmological parameters from the WMAP's first-year results. Three sets are given below; the first and second sets are WMAP data; the difference is the addition of spectral indices, predictions of some inflationary models. The third data set combines the WMAP constraints with those from other CMB experiments (ACBAR and CBI), and constraints from the 2dF Galaxy Redshift Survey and Lyman alpha forest measurements. There are degenerations among the parameters, the most significant is between $n_s$ and $\tau$; the errors given are at 68% confidence.

Best-fit cosmological parameters from WMAP one-year results
Parameter	Symbol	Best fit (WMAP only)	Best fit (WMAP, extra parameter)	Best fit (all data)
Age of the universe (Ga)	$t_0$	13.4±0.3	–	13.7±0.2
Hubble's constant ( km/Mpc·s )	$H_0$	72±5	70±5	71+4 −3
Baryonic content	$\Omega_b h^2$	0.024±0.001	0.023±0.002	0.0224±0.0009
Matter content	$\Omega_m h^2$	0.14±0.02	0.14±0.02	0.135+0.008 −0.009
Optical depth to reionization	$\tau$	0.166+0.076 −0.071	0.20±0.07	0.17±0.06
Amplitude	A	0.9±0.1	0.92±0.12	0.83+0.09 −0.08
Scalar spectral index	$n_s$	0.99±0.04	0.93±0.07	0.93±0.03
Running of spectral index	$dn_s / dk$	—	−0.047±0.04	−0.031+0.016 −0.017
Fluctuation amplitude at 8h^{−1} Mpc	$\sigma_8$	0.9±0.1	—	0.84±0.04
Total density of the universe	$\Omega_{tot}$	–	–	1.02±0.02

Using the best-fit data and theoretical models, the WMAP team determined the times of important universal events, including the redshift of reionization, 17±4; the redshift of decoupling, 1089±1 (and the universe's age at decoupling, 379+8
−7 kyr); and the redshift of matter/radiation equality, 3233+194
−210. They determined the thickness of the surface of last scattering to be 195±2 in redshift, or 118+3
−2 kyr. They determined the current density of baryons, (2.5±0.1)×10^{−7} cm^{−1}, and the ratio of baryons to photons, 6.1+0.3
−0.2×10^{−10}. The WMAP's detection of an early reionization excluded warm dark matter.

The team also examined Milky Way emissions at the WMAP frequencies, producing a 208-point source catalogue.

=== Three-year data release ===
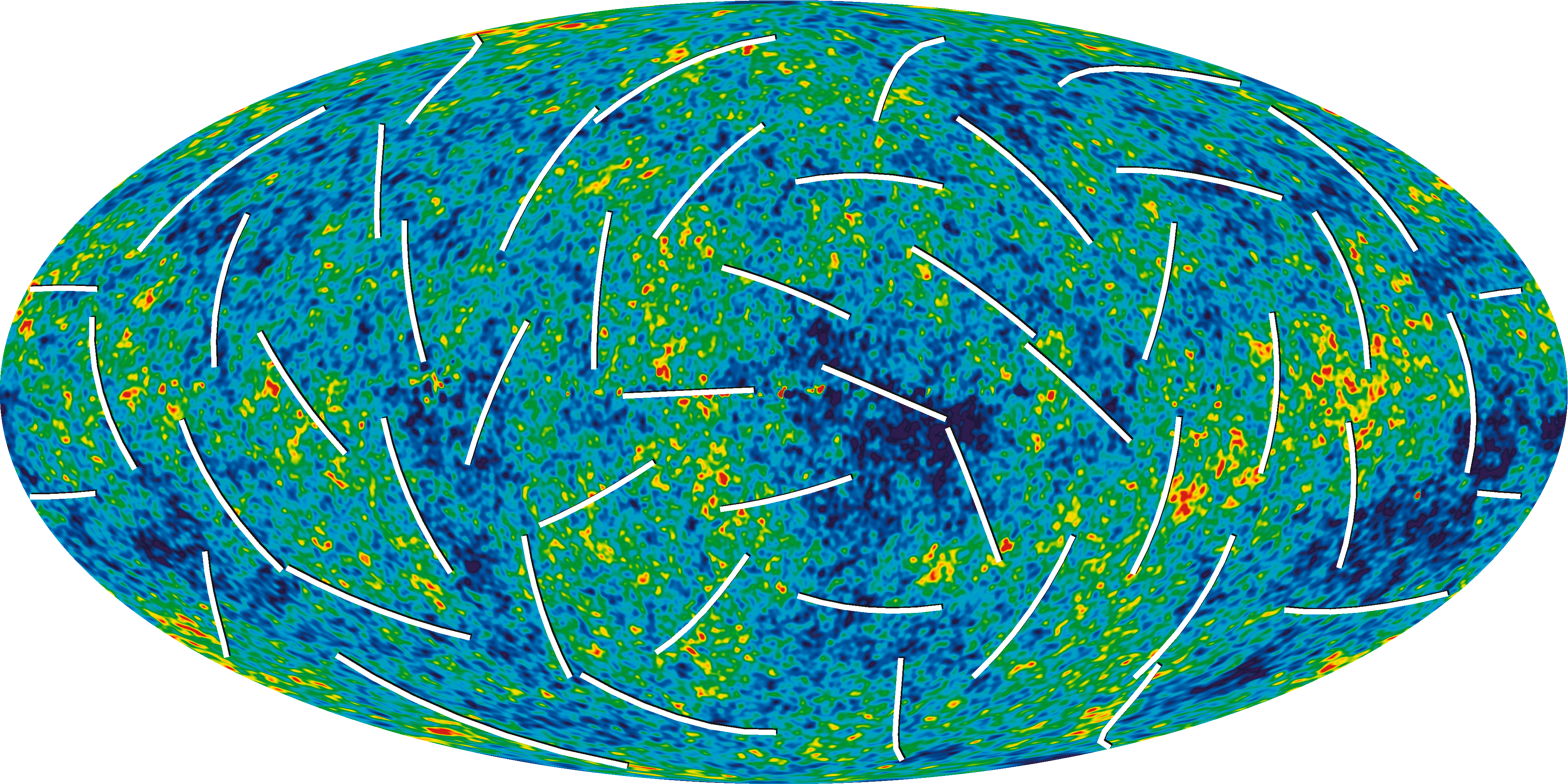
Three-year WMAP image of background cosmic radiation (2006)

The three-year WMAP data were released on 17 March 2006. The data included temperature and polarization measurements of the CMB, which provided further confirmation of the standard flat Lambda-CDM model and new evidence in support of inflation.

The 3-year WMAP data alone shows that the universe must have dark matter. Results were computed both only using WMAP data, and also with a mix of parameter constraints from other instruments, including other CMB experiments (Arcminute Cosmology Bolometer Array Receiver (ACBAR), Cosmic Background Imager (CBI) and BOOMERANG), Sloan Digital Sky Survey (SDSS), the 2dF Galaxy Redshift Survey, the Supernova Legacy Survey and constraints on the Hubble constant from the Hubble Space Telescope.

Best-fit cosmological parameters from WMAP three-year results
Parameter	Symbol	Best fit (WMAP only)
Age of the universe (Ga)	$t_0$	13.73+0.16 −0.15
Hubble's constant ( km/Mpc·s )	$H_0$	73.2+3.1 −3.2
Baryonic content	$\Omega_b h^2$	0.0229±0.00073
Matter content	$\Omega_m h^2$	0.1277+0.0080 −0.0079
Optical depth to reionization ^{^{[a]}}	$\tau$	0.089±0.030
Scalar spectral index	$n_s$	0.958±0.016
Fluctuation amplitude at 8h^{−1} Mpc	$\sigma_8$	0.761+0.049 −0.048
Tensor-to-scalar ratio ^{^{[b]}}	r	<0.65

[a] Optical depth to reionization improved due to polarization measurements.
[b] <0.30 when combined with SDSS data. No indication of non-gaussianity.

=== Five-year data release ===
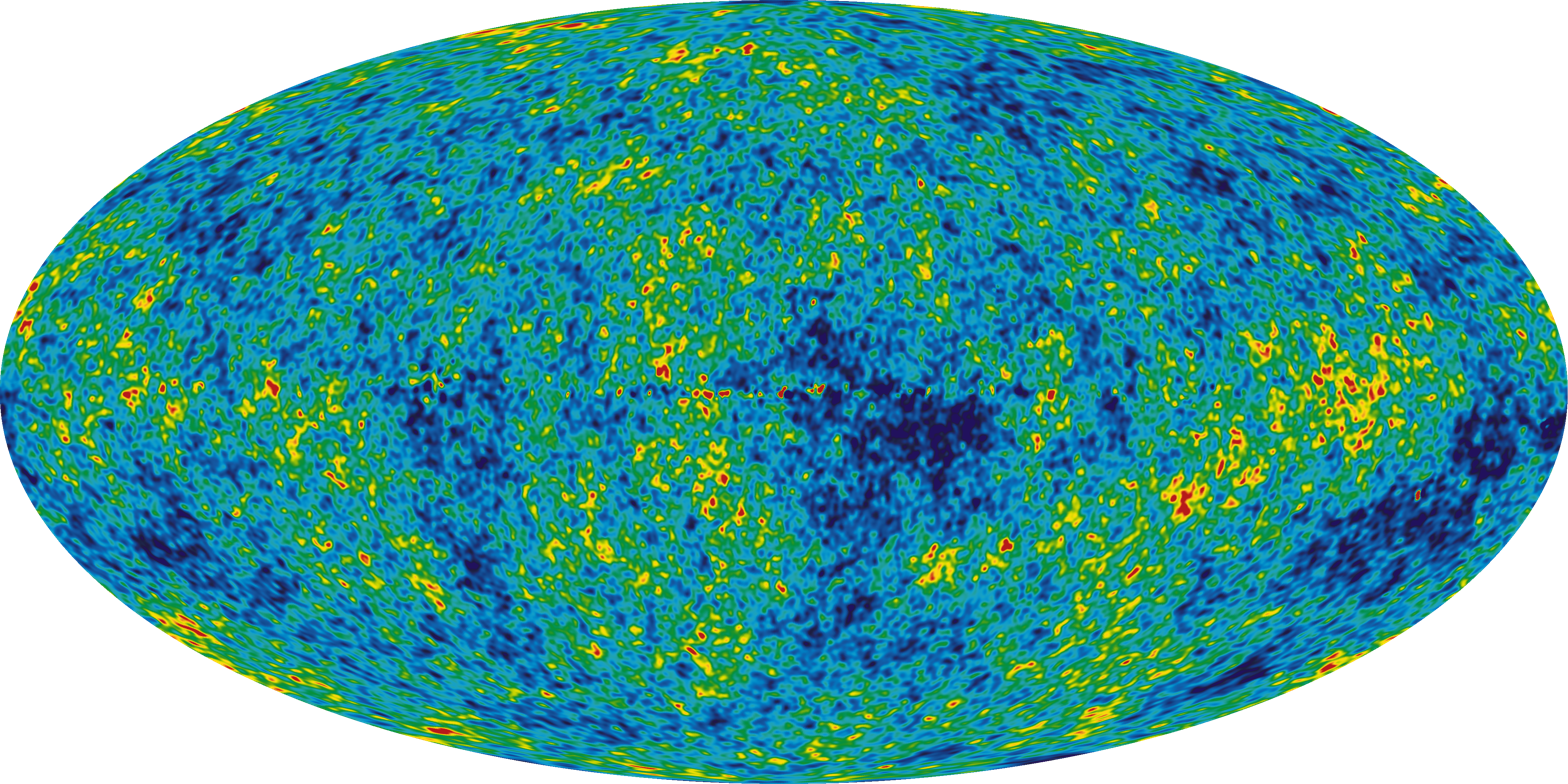
Five-year WMAP image of background cosmic radiation (2008)

The five-year WMAP data were released on 28 February 2008. The data included new evidence for the cosmic neutrino background, evidence that it took over half billion years for the first stars to reionize the universe, and new constraints on cosmic inflation.

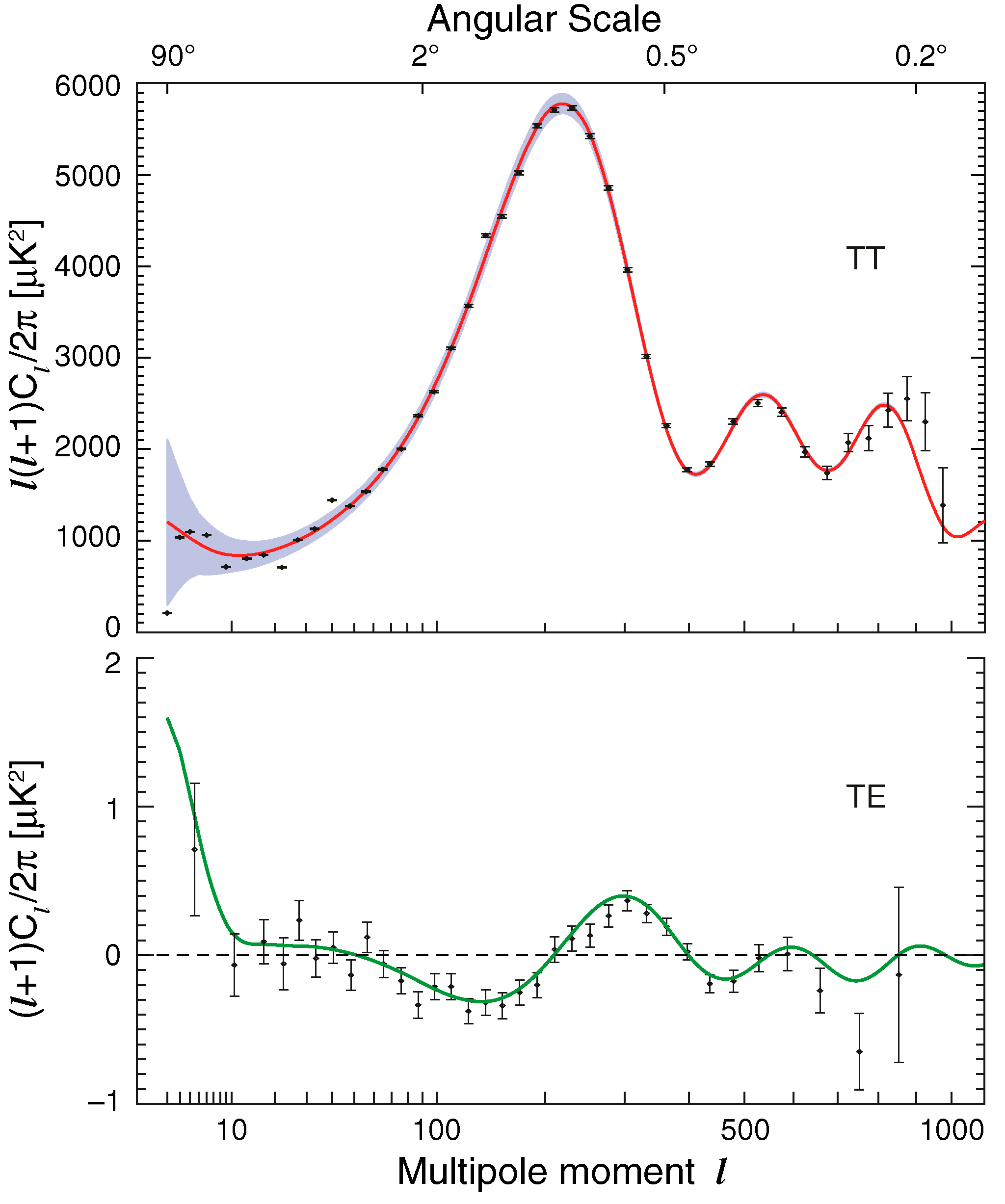
The five-year total-intensity and polarization spectra from WMAP

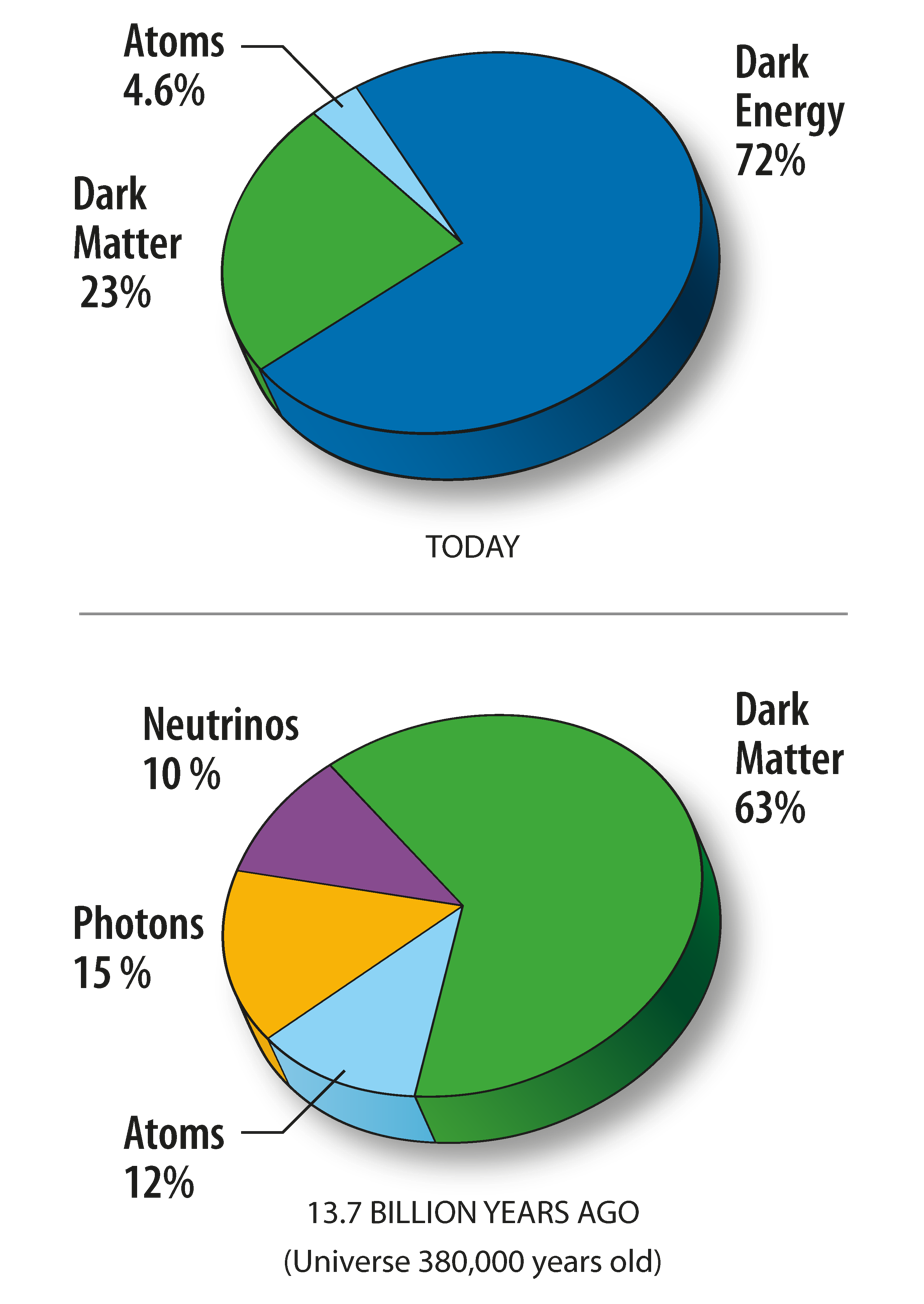
Matter/energy content in the current universe (top) and at the time of photon decoupling in the recombination epoch 380,000 years after the Big Bang (bottom)

The improvement in the results came from both having an extra two years of measurements (the data set runs between midnight on 10 August 2001 to midnight of 9 August 2006), as well as using improved data processing techniques and a better characterization of the instrument, most notably of the beam shapes. They also make use of the 33-GHz observations for estimating cosmological parameters; previously only the 41-GHz and 61-GHz channels had been used.

Improved masks were used to remove foregrounds. Improvements to the spectra were in the 3rd acoustic peak, and the polarization spectra.

The measurements put constraints on the content of the universe at the time that the CMB was emitted; at the time 10% of the universe was made up of neutrinos, 12% of atoms, 15% of photons and 63% dark matter. The contribution of dark energy at the time was negligible. It also constrained the content of the present-day universe; 4.6% atoms, 23% dark matter and 72% dark energy.

The WMAP five-year data was combined with measurements from Type Ia supernova (SNe) and Baryon acoustic oscillations (BAO).

The elliptical shape of the WMAP skymap is the result of a Mollweide projection.

Best-fit cosmological parameters from WMAP five-year results
Parameter	Symbol	Best fit (WMAP only)	Best fit (WMAP + SNe + BAO)
Age of the universe (Ga)	$t_0$	13.69±0.13	13.72±0.12
Hubble's constant ( km/Mpc·s )	$H_0$	71.9+2.6 −2.7	70.5±1.3
Baryonic content	$\Omega_b h^2$	0.02273±0.00062	0.02267+0.00058 −0.00059
Cold dark matter content	$\Omega_c h^2$	0.1099±0.0062	0.1131±0.0034
Dark energy content	$\Omega_\Lambda$	0.742±0.030	0.726±0.015
Optical depth to reionization	$\tau$	0.087±0.017	0.084±0.016
Scalar spectral index	$n_s$	0.963+0.014 −0.015	0.960±0.013
Running of spectral index	$dn_s / dlnk$	−0.037±0.028	−0.028±0.020
Fluctuation amplitude at 8h^{−1} Mpc	$\sigma_8$	0.796±0.036	0.812±0.026
Total density of the universe	$\Omega_{tot}$	1.099+0.100 −0.085	1.0050+0.0060 −0.0061
Tensor-to-scalar ratio	r	<0.43	<0.22

The data puts limits on the value of the tensor-to-scalar ratio, r <0.22 (95% certainty), which determines the level at which gravitational waves affect the polarization of the CMB, and also puts limits on the amount of primordial non-gaussianity. Improved constraints were put on the redshift of reionization, which is 10.9±1.4, the redshift of decoupling, 1090.88±0.72 (as well as age of universe at decoupling, 376.971+3.162
−3.167 kyr) and the redshift of matter/radiation equality, 3253+89
−87.

The extragalactic source catalogue was expanded to include 390 sources, and variability was detected in the emission from Mars and Saturn.

The five-year maps at different frequencies from WMAP with foregrounds (the red band)
23-GHz	33-GHz	41-GHz	61-GHz	94-GHz
23 GHz	33 GHz	41 GHz	61 GHz	94 GHz

=== Seven-year data release ===
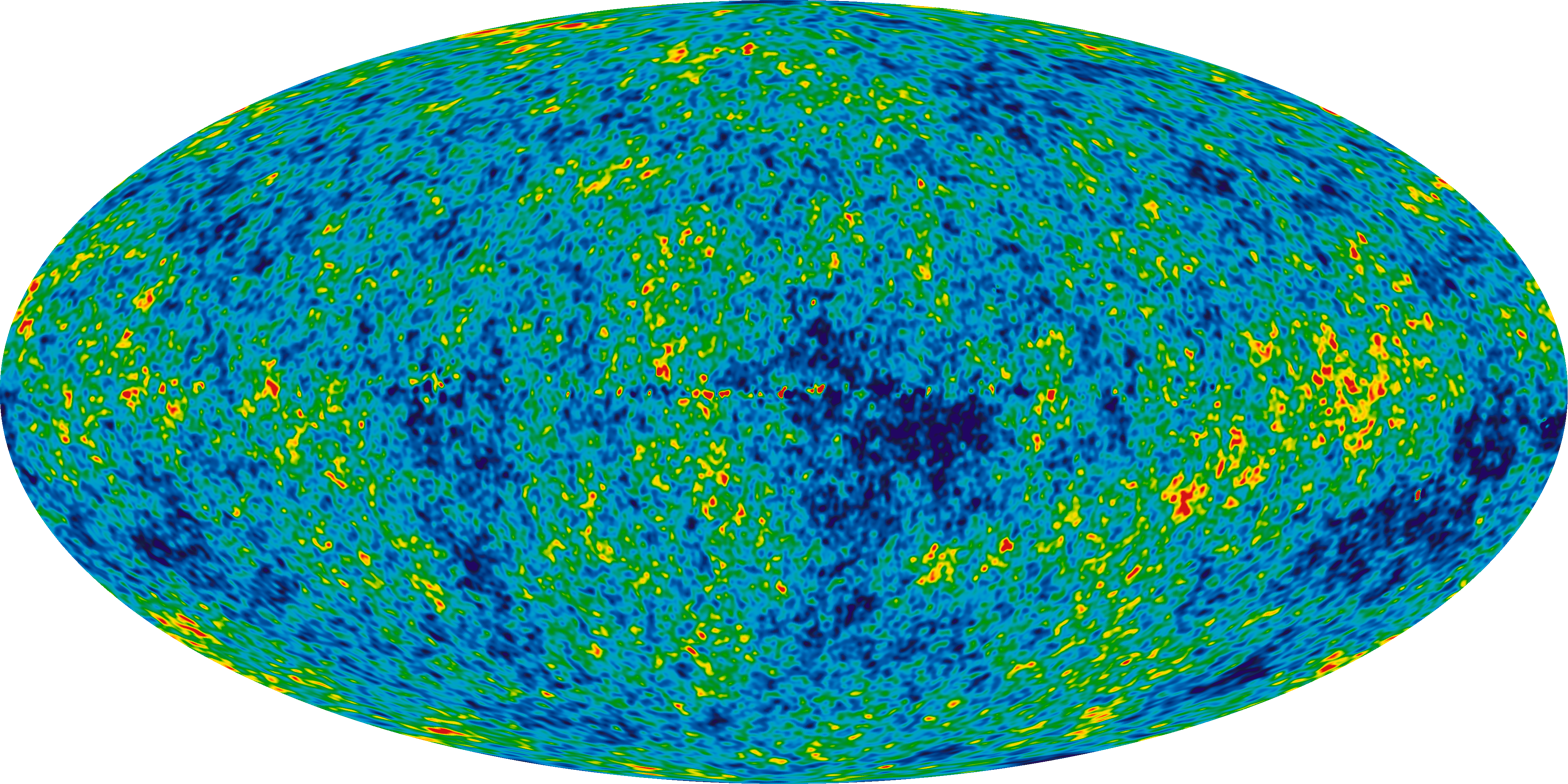
7-year WMAP image of background cosmic radiation (2010)

The seven-year WMAP data were released on 26 January 2010. As part of this release, claims for inconsistencies with the standard model were investigated. Most were shown not to be statistically significant, and likely due to a posteriori selection (where one sees a weird deviation, but fails to consider properly how hard one has been looking; a deviation with 1:1000 likelihood will typically be found if one tries one thousand times). For the deviations that do remain, there are no alternative cosmological ideas (for instance, there seem to be correlations with the ecliptic pole). It seems most likely these are due to other effects, with the report mentioning uncertainties in the precise beam shape and other possible small remaining instrumental and analysis issues.

The other confirmation of major significance is of the total amount of matter/energy in the universe in the form of dark energy – 72.8% (within 1.6%) as non 'particle' background, and dark matter – 22.7% (within 1.4%) of non baryonic (sub-atomic) 'particle' energy. This leaves matter, or baryonic particles (atoms) at only 4.56% (within 0.16%).

Best-fit cosmological parameters from WMAP seven-year results
Parameter	Symbol	Best fit (WMAP only)	Best fit (WMAP + BAO + H_{0})
Age of the universe (Ga)	$t_0$	13.75±0.13	13.75±0.11
Hubble's constant ( km/Mpc·s )	$H_0$	71.0±2.5	70.4+1.3 −1.4
Baryon density	$\Omega_b$	0.0449±0.0028	0.0456±0.0016
Physical baryon density	$\Omega_b h^2$	0.02258+0.00057 −0.00056	0.02260±0.00053
Dark matter density	$\Omega_c$	0.222±0.026	0.227±0.014
Physical dark matter density	$\Omega_c h^2$	0.1109±0.0056	0.1123±0.0035
Dark energy density	$\Omega_\Lambda$	0.734±0.029	0.728+0.015 −0.016
Fluctuation amplitude at 8h^{−1} Mpc	$\sigma_8$	0.801±0.030	0.809±0.024
Scalar spectral index	$n_s$	0.963±0.014	0.963±0.012
Reionization optical depth	$\tau$	0.088±0.015	0.087±0.014
*Total density of the universe	$\Omega_{tot}$	1.080+0.093 −0.071	1.0023+0.0056 −0.0054
*Tensor-to-scalar ratio, k_{0} = 0.002 Mpc^{−1}	r	< 0.36 (95% CL)	< 0.24 (95% CL)
*Running of spectral index, k_{0} = 0.002 Mpc^{−1}	$dn_s / d\ln k$	−0.034±0.026	−0.022±0.020
Note: * = Parameters for extended models (parameters place limits on deviations from the Lambda-CDM model)

The Seven-year maps at different frequencies from WMAP with foregrounds (the red band)
23-GHz	33-GHz	41-GHz	61-GHz	94-GHz
23-GHz	33-GHz	41-GHz	61-GHz	94-GHz

=== Nine-year data release ===
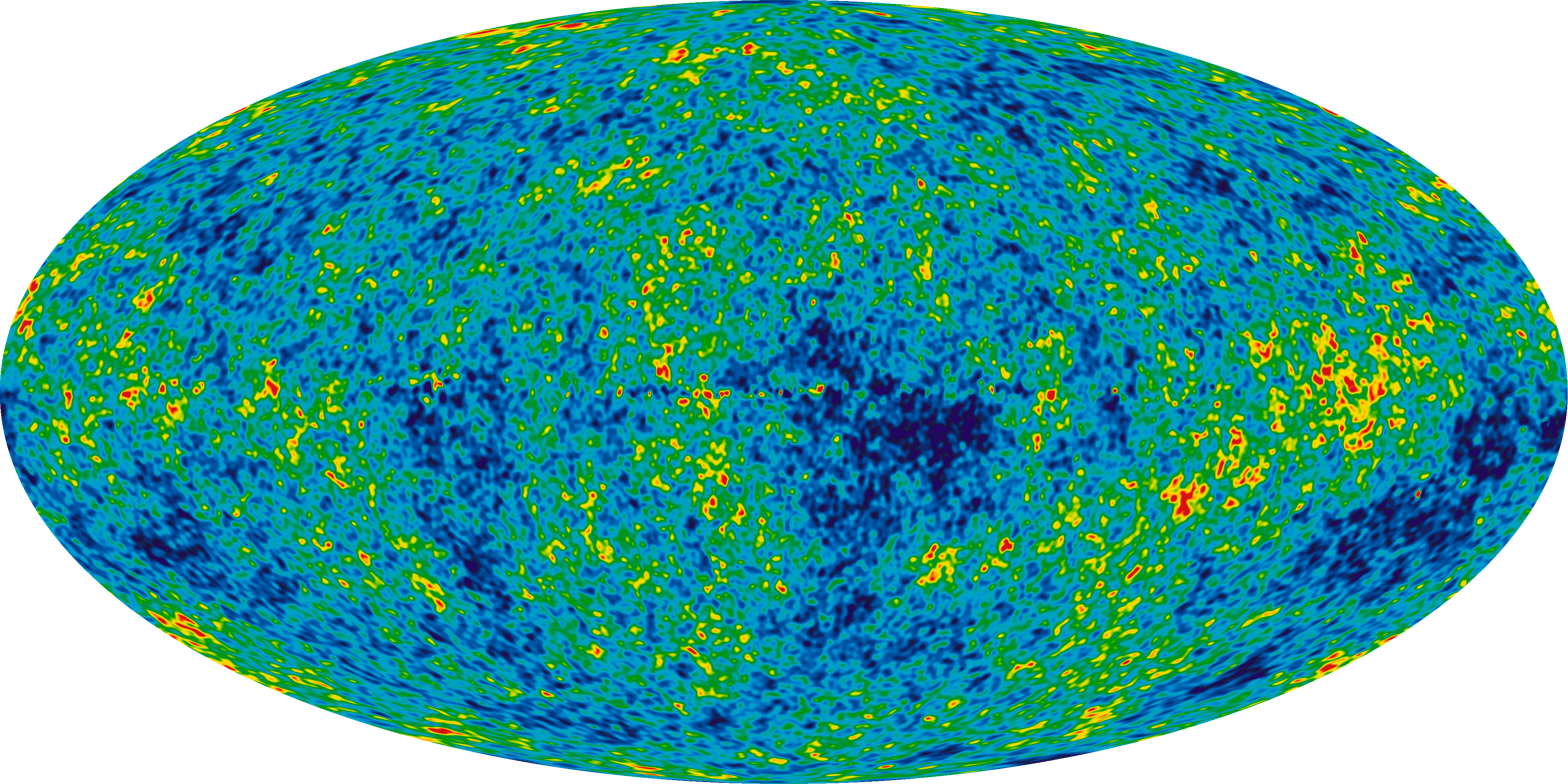
9-year WMAP image of background cosmic radiation (2012)

On 29 December 2012, the nine-year WMAP data and related images were released. 13.772±0.059 billion-year-old temperature fluctuations and a temperature range of ± 200 microkelvins are shown in the image. In addition, the study found that 95% of the early universe is composed of dark matter and dark energy, the curvature of space is less than 0.4% of "flat" and the universe emerged from the cosmic Dark Ages "about 400 million years" after the Big Bang.

Best-fit cosmological parameters from WMAP nine-year results
Parameter	Symbol	Best fit (WMAP only)	Best fit (WMAP + eCMB + BAO + H_{0})
Age of the universe (Ga)	$t_0$	13.74±0.11	13.772±0.059
Hubble's constant ( km/Mpc·s )	$H_0$	70.0±2.2	69.32±0.80
Baryon density	$\Omega_b$	0.0463±0.0024	0.04628±0.00093
Physical baryon density	$\Omega_b h^2$	0.02264±0.00050	0.02223±0.00033
Cold dark matter density	$\Omega_c$	0.233±0.023	0.2402+0.0088 −0.0087
Physical cold dark matter density	$\Omega_c h^2$	0.1138±0.0045	0.1153±0.0019
Dark energy density	$\Omega_\Lambda$	0.721±0.025	0.7135+0.0095 −0.0096
Density fluctuations at 8h^{−1} Mpc	$\sigma_8$	0.821±0.023	0.820+0.013 −0.014
Scalar spectral index	$n_s$	0.972±0.013	0.9608±0.0080
Reionization optical depth	$\tau$	0.089±0.014	0.081±0.012
Curvature	1 $-$ $\Omega_{\rm tot}$	−0.037+0.044 −0.042	−0.0027+0.0039 −0.0038
Tensor-to-scalar ratio (k_{0} = 0.002 Mpc^{−1})	r	< 0.38 (95% CL)	< 0.13 (95% CL)
Running scalar spectral index	$dn_s / d\ln k$	−0.019±0.025	−0.023±0.011

== Main result ==
Interviews with Charles Bennett and Lyman Page about WMAP

The main result of the mission is contained in the various oval maps of the CMB temperature differences. These oval images present the temperature distribution derived by the WMAP team from the observations by the telescope during the mission. Measured is the temperature obtained from a Planck's law interpretation of the microwave background. The oval map covers the whole sky. The results are a snapshot of the universe around 300,000 years after the Big Bang, which happened about 13.8 billion years ago. The microwave background is very homogeneous in temperature (the relative variations from the mean, which presently is still 2.7 kelvins, are only of the order of 5×10^{−5}). The temperature variations corresponding to the local directions are presented through different colors (the "red" directions are hotter, the "blue" directions cooler than the average).

== Follow-on missions and future measurements ==
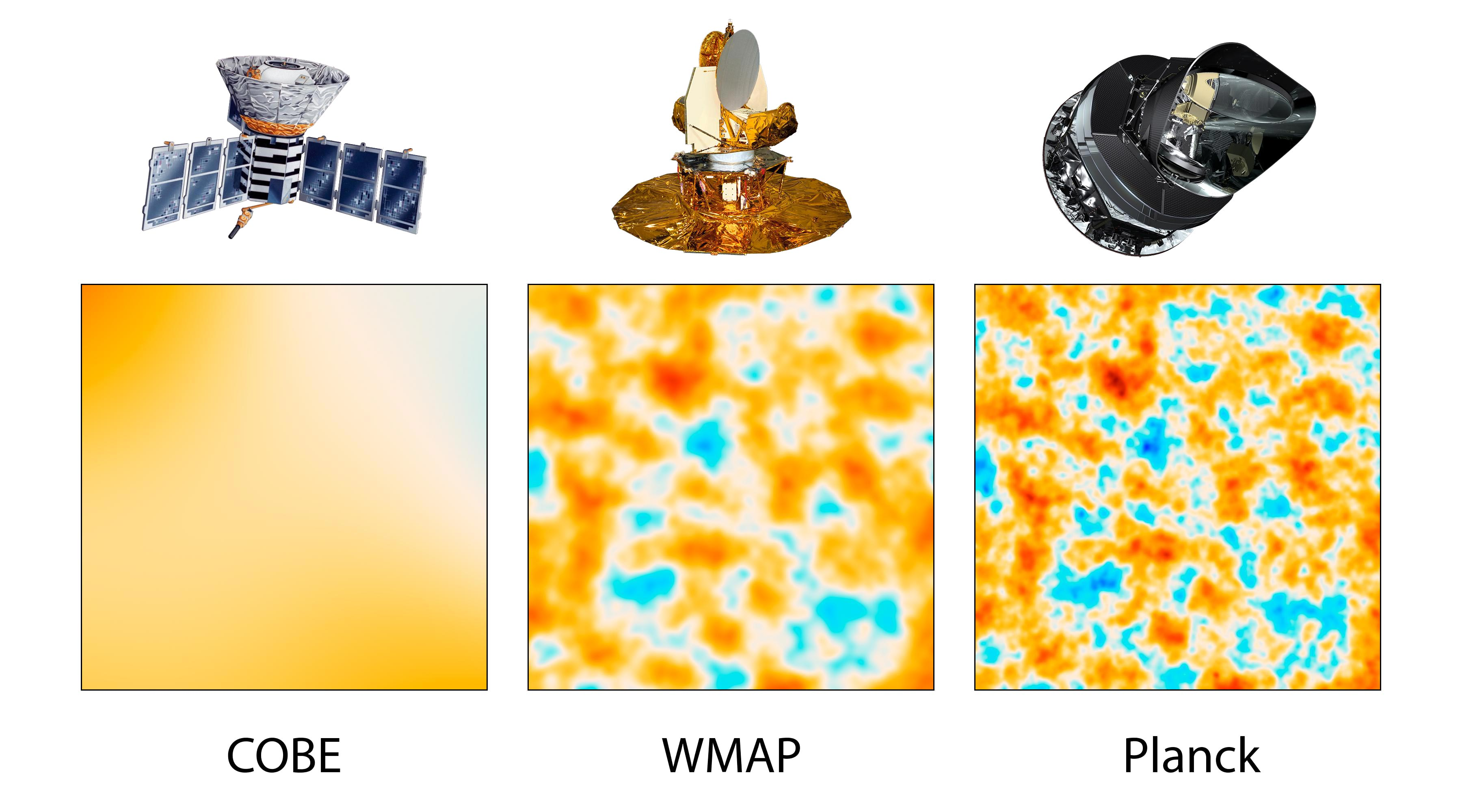
Comparison of CMB results from COBE, WMAP and Planck – 21 March 2013

The original timeline for WMAP gave it two years of observations; these were completed by September 2003. Mission extensions were granted in 2002, 2004, 2006, and 2008 giving the spacecraft a total of 9 observing years, which ended August 2010 and in October 2010 the spacecraft was moved to a heliocentric "graveyard" orbit.

The Planck spacecraft also measured the CMB from 2009 to 2013 and aims to refine the measurements made by WMAP, both in total intensity and polarization. Various ground- and balloon-based instruments have also made CMB contributions, and others are being constructed to do so. Many are aimed at searching for the B-mode polarization expected from the simplest models of inflation, including The E and B Experiment (EBEX), Spider, BICEP and Keck Array (BICEP2), Keck, QUIET, Cosmology Large Angular Scale Surveyor (CLASS), South Pole Telescope (SPTpol) and others.

On 21 March 2013, the European-led research team behind the Planck spacecraft released the mission's all-sky map of the cosmic microwave background. The map suggests the universe is slightly older than previously thought. According to the map, subtle fluctuations in temperature were imprinted on the deep sky when the cosmos was about 370,000 years old. The imprint reflects ripples that arose as early, in the existence of the universe, as the first nonillionth (10^{−30}) of a second. Apparently, these ripples gave rise to the present vast cosmic web of galaxy clusters and dark matter. Based on the 2013 data, the universe contains 4.9% ordinary matter, 26.8% dark matter and 68.3% dark energy. On 5 February 2015, new data was released by the Planck mission, according to which the age of the universe is 13.799 ± 0.021 billion years and the Hubble constant is 67.74 ± 0.46 (km/s)/Mpc.

== See also ==
- Explorers Program
- Illustris project
- List of cosmic microwave background experiments
- List of cosmological computation software
- S150 Galactic X-Ray Mapping
