= Kinetic inductance detector =

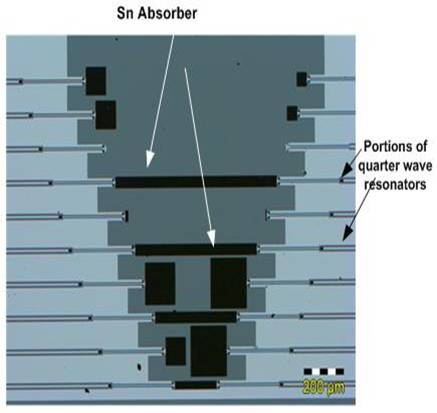
Chip containing aluminum kinetic inductance detectors with tin absorbers. Image credit: Argonne National Lab.

The kinetic inductance detector (KID) — also known as a microwave kinetic inductance detector (MKID) — is a type of superconducting photon detector capable of counting single photons whilst simultaneously measuring their energy and arrival time to high precision. They were first developed by scientists at the California Institute of Technology and the Jet Propulsion Laboratory in 2003. These devices operate at cryogenic temperatures, typically below 1 kelvin. They are being developed for high-sensitivity astronomical detection for frequencies ranging from the far-infrared to X-rays. KIDs are notable as photosensors that can differentiate incident photon energies, though they are limited by quantum uncertainty to an approximate spectral resolution of R≈100.

== Principle of operation ==
Photons incident on a strip of superconducting material break Cooper pairs and create excess quasiparticles. The kinetic inductance of the superconducting strip is inversely proportional to the density of Cooper pairs, and thus the kinetic inductance increases upon photon absorption. This inductance is combined with a capacitor to form a microwave resonator whose resonant frequency changes with the absorption of photons. This resonator-based readout is useful for developing large-format detector arrays, as each KID can be addressed by a single microwave tone and many detectors can be measured using a single broadband microwave channel, a technique known as frequency-division multiplexing. This shift in resonant frequency also causes a phase shift proportional to the incident photon energy which is the primary way in which detections are identified.

== Applications ==
KIDs are being developed for a range of astronomy applications, including millimeter and submillimeter wavelength detection at the Caltech Submillimeter Observatory, the Atacama Pathfinder Experiment (APEX) on the Llano de Chajnantor Observatory, the CCAT Observatory, the Large Millimeter Telescope, and the IRAM 30-m telescope. They are also being developed for optical and near-infrared detection at the Palomar Observatory. KIDs have also flown on two balloon-borne telescopes, OLIMPO in 2018 and BLAST-TNG in 2020. They are also foreseen for the spectrometers of the planned PRobe far-Infrared Mission for Astrophysics (PRIMA) telescope, which NASA has selected for launch no earlier than 2033. They are also the basis for a new class of multi object high resolution spectrometer which would replace the second dispersive element of an echelle spectrograph and the photosensor with a linear KID array. KIDs have also gained popularity as a more compact, lower cost, and less complex alternative to transition edge sensors.

== See also ==
- Kinetic inductance
- Cryogenic particle detectors
