= Electrothermal feedback =

In electronics, electrothermal feedback is the interaction of the electric current and the temperature in a device with a temperature-dependent electrical resistance. This interaction arises from Joule heating.

The temperature-dependence of the electrical resistance is described by the derivative of the resistance with respect to temperature dR/dT. Semiconductors typically exhibit a negative dR/dT. Superconductors exhibit a large positive dR/dT on the superconducting phase transition. Normal (non-superconducting) metals typically exhibit a positive dR/dT that decreases to zero at very low temperatures.

If a device has a positive dR/dT, an increase in temperature (for example, due to thermal fluctuations or the absorption of a photon) will increase the electrical resistance R. If the device is biased with a constant voltage V, this increase in resistance will decrease the Joule power P = V^{2}/R. The decrease in Joule heating will cause the device to return to its equilibrium temperature. This is known as negative electrothermal feedback, as the change in Joule heating opposes the change in temperature. If the device is instead biased with a constant current I, the Joule power P = I^{2}R will increase if the temperature increases. Thus the Joule heating amplifies a change in temperature, an effect known as positive electrothermal feedback. The situation is reversed for the case of a negative dR/dT.

Electrothermal feedback is important for describing the performance of several types of photodetectors such as the bolometer, the transition edge sensor, and the superconducting nanowire single-photon detector.
