= The E and B Experiment =

Astronomical experiment

- Location(s): Antarctica
- Website: groups.physics.umn.edu/cosmology/ebex/

The E and B Experiment (EBEX) was an experiment that measured the cosmic microwave background radiation of a part of the sky during two sub-orbital (high-altitude) balloon flights and took large, high-fidelity images of the CMB polarization anisotropies using a telescope which flew at over 42,000 metres (138,000 ft) high. The altitude of the telescope made it possible to reduce the atmospheric absorption of microwaves, which allowed massive cost reduction compared to a satellite probe, however, only a small part of the sky can be scanned and for a shorter duration than a typical satellite mission such as WMAP.

The first flight was an engineering flight over North America in 2009. For the science flight, EBEX was launched on 29 December 2012, near McMurdo Station in Antarctica. It circled around the South Pole using the polar vortex winds before landing on 24 January 2013 about 400 miles (640 km) from McMurdo.

== Instrumentation ==
EBEX consists of a 1.5 m Dragone-type telescope that provides a resolution of 8 arcminutes in frequency bands centered on 150, 250, and 410 GHz. Polarimetry is achieved with a continuously-rotating achromatic half-wave plate supported by a superconducting magnetic bearing and a fixed wire grid polarizer. The wire grid is mounted at 45 degrees to the incoming light beam and transmits one polarization state while reflecting the other. Each polarization state is subsequently detected by its own focal plane with a 6 degree instantaneous field-of-view on the sky. Each of the focal planes contains up to 960 transition-edge sensors read out with frequency-domain SQUID multiplexing.

== Temporary disappearance ==
The EBEX telescope was reported missing in May 2012, while in transit from the University of Minnesota to the NASA Columbia Scientific Balloon Facility in Palestine, Texas. The driver of the truck said that the trailer had been stolen while parked at a motel in Dallas. Scientists and employees of the trucking company searched the area and found the missing trailer parked at a truck wash near Hutchins, Texas. The trailer had been opened, but no scientific equipment had been stolen and the telescope was undamaged.

== Flight ==
EBEX launched from Williams Field on the Antarctic coast on 29 December 2012.

== See also ==
- Cosmic microwave background experiments
- Observational cosmology
