= Cryogenic particle detector =

Class of scientific instruments

Cryogenic particle detectors operate at very low temperature, typically only a few degrees above absolute zero. These sensors interact with an energetic elementary particle (such as a photon) and deliver a signal that can be related to the type of particle and the nature of the interaction. While many types of particle detectors might be operated with improved performance at cryogenic temperatures, this term generally refers to types that take advantage of special effects or properties occurring only at low temperature.

== Introduction ==
The most commonly cited reason for operating any sensor at low temperature is the reduction in thermal noise, which is proportional to the square root of the absolute temperature. However, at very low temperature, certain material properties become very sensitive to energy deposited by particles in their passage through the sensor, and the gain from these changes may be even more than that from reduction in thermal noise. Two such commonly used properties are heat capacity and electrical resistivity, particularly superconductivity; other designs are based on superconducting tunnel junctions, quasiparticle trapping, rotons in superfluids, magnetic bolometers, and other principles.

Originally, astronomy pushed the development of cryogenic detectors for optical and infrared radiation.^{[1]} Later, particle physics and cosmology motivated cryogenic detector development for sensing known and predicted particles such as neutrinos, axions, and weakly interacting massive particles (WIMPs).^{[2]}^{[3]}

== Types of cryogenic particle detectors ==
=== Calorimetric particle detection ===
A calorimeter is a device that measures the amount of heat deposited in a sample of material. A calorimeter differs from a bolometer in that a calorimeter measures energy, while a bolometer measures power.

Below the Debye temperature of a crystalline dielectric material (such as silicon), the heat capacity decreases inversely as the cube of the absolute temperature. It becomes very small, so that the sample's increase in temperature for a given heat input may be relatively large. This makes it practical to make a calorimeter that has a very large temperature excursion for a small amount of heat input, such as that deposited by a passing particle. The temperature rise can be measured with a standard type of thermistor, as in a classical calorimeter. In general, small sample size and very sensitive thermistors are required to make a sensitive particle detector by this method.

In principle, several types of resistance thermometers can be used. The limit of sensitivity to energy deposition is determined by the magnitude of resistance fluctuations, which are in turn determined by thermal fluctuations. Since all resistors exhibit voltage fluctuations that are proportional to their temperature, an effect known as Johnson noise, a reduction of temperature is often the only way to achieve the required sensitivity.

==== Superconducting transition-edge sensors ====
A very sensitive calorimetric sensor known as a transition-edge sensor (TES) takes advantage of superconductivity. Most pure superconductors have a very sharp transition from normal resistivity to superconductivity at some low temperature. By operating on the superconducting phase transition, a very small change in temperature resulting from interaction with a particle results in a significant change in resistance.

==== Superconducting tunnel junctions ====
The superconducting tunnel junction (STJ) consists of two pieces of superconducting material separated by a very thin (~nanometer) insulating layer. It is also known as a superconductor-insulator-superconductor tunnel junction (SIS) and is a type of a Josephson junction. Cooper pairs can tunnel across the insulating barrier, a phenomenon known as the Josephson effect. Quasiparticles can also tunnel across the barrier, although the quasiparticle current is suppressed for voltages less than twice the superconducting energy gap. A photon absorbed on one side of a STJ breaks Cooper pairs and creates quasiparticles. In the presence of an applied voltage across the junction, the quasiparticles tunnel across the junction, and the resulting tunneling current is proportional to the photon energy. The STJ can also be used as a heterodyne detector by exploiting the change in the nonlinear current–voltage characteristic that results from photon-assisted tunneling. STJs are the most sensitive heterodyne detectors available for the 100 GHz – 1 THz frequency range and are employed for astronomical observation at these frequencies.

==== Kinetic inductance detectors ====
The kinetic inductance detector (KID) is based on measuring the change in kinetic inductance caused by the absorption of photons in a thin strip of superconducting material. The change in inductance is typically measured as the change in the resonant frequency of a microwave resonator, and hence these detectors are also known as microwave kinetic inductance detectors (MKIDs).

==== Superconducting granules ====
The superconducting transition alone can be used to directly measure the heating caused by a passing particle. A type-I superconducting grain in a magnetic field exhibits perfect diamagnetism and excludes the field completely from its interior. If it is held slightly below the transition temperature, the superconductivity vanishes on heating by particle radiation, and the field suddenly penetrates the interior. This field change can be detected by a surrounding coil. The change is reversible when the grain cools again. In practice the grains must be very small and carefully made, and carefully coupled to the coil.

==== Magnetic calorimeters ====
Paramagnetic rare-earth ions are being used as particle sensors by sensing the spin flips of the paramagnetic atoms induced by heat absorbed in a low-heat-capacity material. The ions are used as a magnetic thermometer.

== Other methods ==
=== Phonon particle detection ===
Calorimeters assume the sample is in thermal equilibrium or nearly so. In crystalline materials at very low temperature this is not necessarily the case. A good deal more information can be found by measuring the elementary excitations of the crystal lattice, or phonons, caused by the interacting particle. This can be done by several methods including superconducting transition edge sensors.

=== Superconducting nanowire single-photon detectors ===
The superconducting nanowire single-photon detector (SNSPD) is based on a superconducting wire cooled well below the superconducting transition temperature and biased with a dc current that is close to but less than the superconducting critical current. The SNSPD is typically made from ≈ 5 nm thick niobium nitride films which are patterned as narrow nanowires (with a typical width of 100 nm). Absorption of a photon breaks Cooper pairs and reduces the critical current below the bias current. A small non-superconducting section across the width of the nanowire is formed.^{[4]}^{[5]} This resistive non-superconducting section then leads to a detectable voltage pulse of a duration of about 1 nanosecond. The main advantages of this type of photon detector are its high speed (a maximal count rate of 2 GHz makes them the fastest available) and its low dark count rate. The main disadvantage is the lack of intrinsic energy resolution.

=== Roton detectors ===
In superfluid ^{4}He the elementary collective excitations are phonons and rotons. A particle striking an electron or nucleus in this superfluid can produce rotons, which may be detected bolometrically or by the evaporation of helium atoms when they reach a free surface. ^{4}He is intrinsically very pure so the rotons travel ballistically and are stable, so that large volumes of fluid can be used.

=== Quasiparticles in superfluid ^{3}He ===
In the B phase, below 0.001 K, superfluid ^{3}He acts similarly to a superconductor. Pairs of atoms are bound as quasiparticles similar to Cooper pairs with a very small energy gap of the order of 100 nanoelectronvolts. This allows building a detector analogous to a superconducting tunnel detector. The advantage is that many (~10^{9}) pairs could be produced by a single interaction, but the difficulties are that it is difficult to measure the excess of normal ^{3}He atoms produced and to prepare and maintain much superfluid at such low temperature.

== See also ==
- Bolometer – Device for measuring incident electromagnetic radiation
- Cryogenic Dark Matter Search – Physics exploration experiment
- Detector – Converter that measures a physical quantity and converts it into a signal
- Domain wall (magnetism) – Interface between magnetic domains
- Flux pinning – Phenomenon related to superconductivity
- Ginzburg–Landau theory – Superconductivity theory
- Husimi Q representation – Computational physics simulation tool
- Josephson effect – Quantum physical phenomenon
- Meissner effect – Expulsion of a magnetic field from a superconductor
- Microbolometer – Microscopic device for detecting infrared radiation
- Superconductors – Electrical conductivity with exactly zero resistance
