= South Pole Telescope =

Radio Telescope at the South Pole

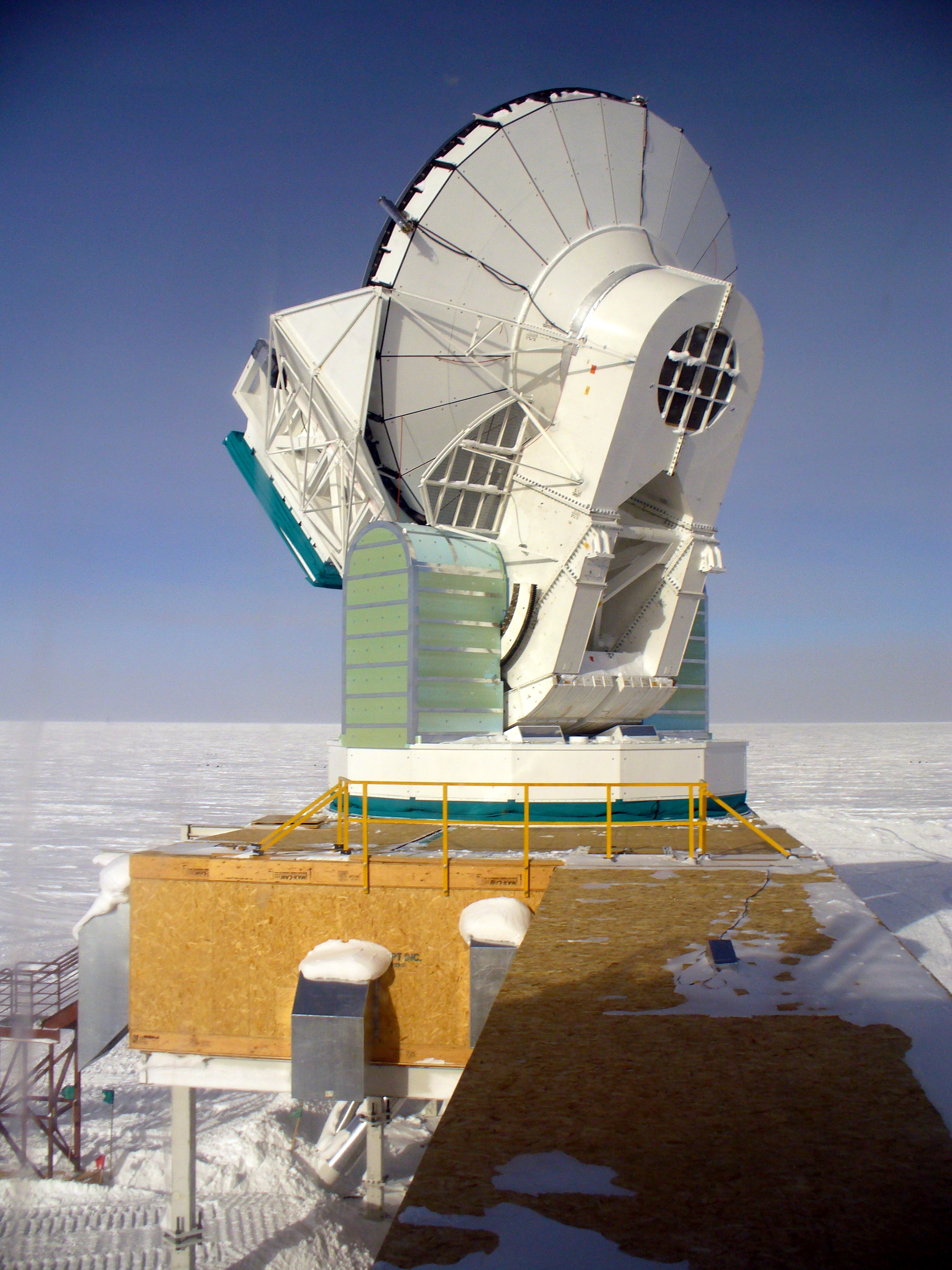
- The South Pole Telescope in November 2009
- Alternative names: SPT
- Location: South Pole, Antarctic Treaty area
- Coordinates: 89°59′22″S 45°00′00″W
- Altitude: 2.8 km (9,200 ft)
- Built: November 2006–February 2007
- Telescope style: Gregorian telescope radio telescope
- Diameter: 10.0 m (32 ft 10 in)
- Secondary diameter: 1 m (3 ft 3 in)
- Mass: 280 t (280,000 kg)
- Collecting area: 78.5 m^{2} (845 sq ft)
- Mounting: altazimuth mount
- Website: pole.uchicago.edu
- Location within Antarctica
- Related media on Commons

The South Pole Telescope (SPT) is a 10-metre (390 in) diameter telescope located at the Amundsen–Scott South Pole Station, Antarctica. The telescope is designed for observations in the microwave, millimeter-wave, and submillimeter-wave regions of the electromagnetic spectrum, with the particular design goal of measuring the faint, diffuse emission from the cosmic microwave background (CMB). Key results include the first detection of B-mode polarization in the CMB, the discovery of over 1000 clusters of galaxies using the Sunyaev–Zel'dovich effect, the discovery of a population of high-redshift, strongly lensed dusty galaxies, and unprecedentedly sensitive measurements of the primary temperature and polarization power spectra of the CMB at small angular scales.

The first major survey with the SPT—designed to find distant, massive, clusters of galaxies through their interaction with the CMB, with the goal of constraining the dark energy equation of state—was completed in October 2011. In early 2012, a new camera (SPTpol) was installed on the SPT with even greater sensitivity and the capability to measure the polarization of incoming light. This camera operated from 2012–2016 and was used to make deep, high-resolution maps of hundreds of square degrees of the Southern sky. In 2017, the third-generation camera SPT-3G was installed on the telescope, providing nearly an order-of-magnitude increase in detectors in the focal plane.

The SPT collaboration is made up of over a dozen (mostly North American) institutions. It is led out of the University of Chicago by project director John Carlstrom. The SPT program is funded primarily by the National Science Foundation and the United States Department of Energy.

== Microwave and millimeter-wave observations at the South Pole ==
The South Pole region is among the premier observing sites in the world for millimeter-wavelength observations. The Pole's high altitude of 2.8 km (9,200 ft) above sea level means the atmosphere is thin, and the extreme cold keeps the amount of water vapor in the air low. This is particularly important for observing at millimeter wavelengths, where incoming signals can be absorbed by water vapor, and where water vapor emits radiation that can be confused with astronomical signals. Since the sun does not rise and set daily, the atmosphere at the pole is particularly stable. In addition, no interference exists from the sun in the millimeter range during the months of polar night.

== The telescope ==
The telescope is a 10-metre (394 in) diameter off-axis Gregorian telescope in an altazimuth mount (at the poles, an altazimuth mount is effectively identical to an equatorial mount). It was designed to allow a large field of view (over 1 square degree) while minimizing systematic uncertainties from ground spill-over and scattering off the telescope optics. The surface of the telescope mirror is smooth down to roughly 25 micrometres (0.98 thou), which allows sub-millimeter wavelength observations. A key feature of the SPT design (now standard among modern CMB telescopes) is that the entire telescope is scanned, so the beam does not move relative to the telescope mirrors. The fast scanning of the telescope and the large field of view make SPT efficient for surveying large areas of sky, which is required to achieve the SPT science goals.

== The SPT-SZ camera ==
The first camera installed on the SPT contained a 960-element bolometer array of superconducting transition edge sensors (TES), which made it one of the largest TES bolometer arrays ever built. The focal plane for this camera (referred to as the SPT-SZ camera because it was designed to conduct a survey of galaxy clusters through their Sunyaev–Zel'dovich effect signature) was split into six pie-shaped wedges, each with 160 detectors. These wedges observed at three different frequencies: 95 GHz, 150 GHz, and 220 GHz. The modularity of the focal plane allowed it to be broken into many different frequency configurations. For the majority of the life of the camera, the SPT-SZ focal plane had one wedge at 95 GHz, four at 150 GHz, and one at 220 GHz. The SPT-SZ camera was used primarily to conduct a survey of 2500 square degrees of the Southern sky (20h to 7h in right ascension, −65d to −40d declination) to a noise level of roughly 15 micro-Kelvin in a 1-arcminute pixel at 150 GHz.

== The SPTpol camera ==
The second camera installed on the SPT–also designed with superconducting TES arrays–was even more sensitive than the SPT-SZ camera and, crucially, had the ability to measure the polarization of the incoming light (hence the name SPTpol). The 780 polarization-sensitive pixels (each with two separate TES bolometers, each sensitive to one linear polarization direction) were divided between observing frequencies of 90 GHz and 150 GHz, and pixels at the two frequencies were designed with different detector architectures. The 150 GHz pixels were corrugated-feedhorn-coupled TES polarimeters fabricated in monolithic arrays at the National Institute of Standards and Technology. The 90 GHz pixels were individually packaged dual-polarization absorber-coupled polarimeters developed at Argonne National Laboratory. The 90 GHz pixels were coupled to the telescope optics through individually machined contoured feedhorns. The first year of SPTpol observing was used to survey a 100-square-degree field centered at R.A. 23h30m declination −55d. The next four years were primarily spent surveying a 500-square-degree region of which the original 100 square degrees is a subset.

== The SPT-3G camera ==
In January 2017, the third-generation camera SPT-3G was installed on the SPT. Taking advantage of a combination of improvements to the optical system (providing a significantly larger diffraction-limited field of view) and new detector technology (enabling detectors in multiple observing bands in a single pixel), the SPT-3G detector array contains over ten times more sensors than SPTpol, translating almost directly into a tenfold increase in the speed with which the telescope and camera can map a patch of sky to a given noise level. The camera consists of over 16,000 detectors, split evenly between 90, 150, and 220 GHz.

Since 2019, the SPT-3G camera has been used to survey nearly 10,000 square degrees of the Southern Sky to very low noise levels. The SPT-3G Main, or Winter, Field is a 1500-square-degree patch of sky that overlaps with the BICEP Array observing field, enabling joint analyses of SPT and BICEP data which will deliver significantly better constraints on a potential signal from primordial gravitational waves than either instrument can provide alone. As of the end of 2025, SPT-3G has been used to survey this field eight months out of the year for six years. When not observing the Main field, the SPT-3G camera has been used to survey the rest of the sky available from the South Pole at reasonable observing elevation and low Galactic contamination, totaling roughly another 8500 square degrees.

== Science goals and results ==
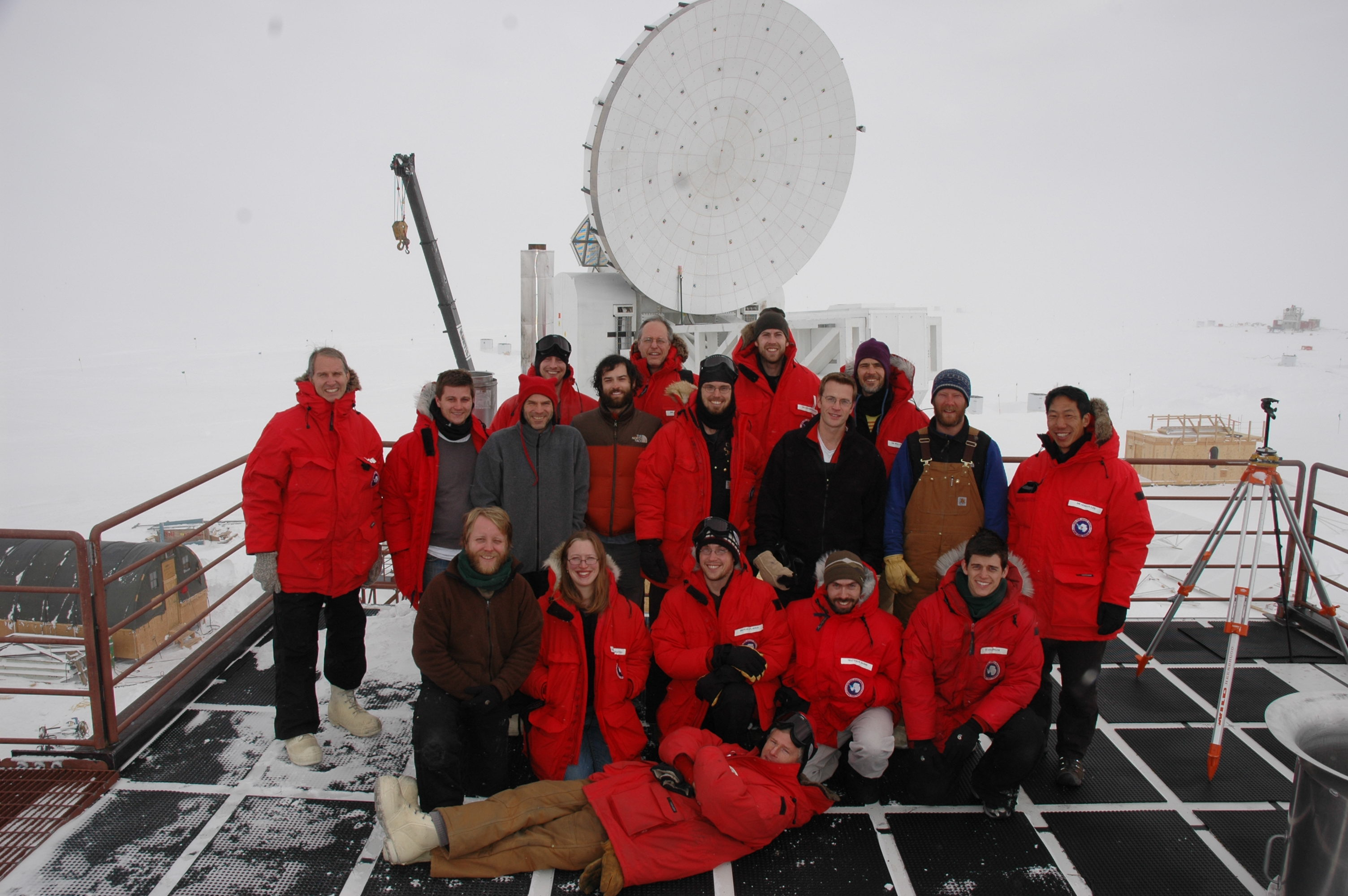
The original South Pole Telescope deployment team in front of the telescope (early 2007).

The first key project for the SPT, completed in October 2011, was a 2500-square degree survey to search for clusters of galaxies using the Sunyaev–Zel'dovich effect, a distortion of the cosmic microwave background radiation (CMB) due to interactions between CMB photons and the Intracluster medium in galaxy clusters. The survey has found hundreds of clusters of galaxies over an extremely wide redshift range. When combined with accurate redshifts and mass estimates for the clusters, this survey will place interesting constraints on the dark energy equation of state. Data from the SPT-SZ survey have also been used to make the most sensitive existing measurements of the CMB power spectrum at angular scales smaller than roughly 5 arcminutes (multipole number larger than 2000) and to discover a population of distant, gravitationally lensed dusty, star-forming galaxies.

Data from the SPTpol camera was used to make several groundbreaking measurements, including the first detection of the so-called "B-mode" or "curl" component of the polarized CMB. This B-mode signal is generated at small angular scales by the gravitational lensing of the much larger primordial "E-mode" polarization signal (generated by scalar density perturbations at the time the CMB was emitted) and at large angular scales by the interaction of the CMB with a background of gravitational waves produced during the epoch of inflation. Measurements of the large-scale B-mode signal have the potential to constrain the energy scale of inflation, thus probing the physics of the universe at the earliest times and highest energy scales imaginable, but these measurements are limited by contamination from the lensing B modes. Using the larger E-mode component of the polarization and measurements of the CMB lensing potential, an estimate can be made of the lensing B modes and used to clean the large-scale measurements. This B-mode delensing was first demonstrated using SPTpol data. SPTpol data also has been used to make the most precise measurements of the E-mode power spectrum and temperature-E-mode correlation spectrum of the CMB and to make high-signal-to-noise maps of the projected matter density using reconstructions of the CMB lensing potential.

The 10000-square-degree SPT-3G survey will be used to achieve multiple science goals, including unprecedented constraints on a background of primordial gravitational waves joint analysis of B-mode polarization with the BICEP Array, a unique sample of distant galaxy clusters for cosmological and cluster evolution studies, and constraints on fundamental physics such as the mass of the neutrinos and the existence of light relic particles in the early Universe.

The Atacama Cosmology Telescope has similar, but complementary, science objectives.

== Funding ==
The South Pole Telescope is funded through the National Science Foundation Office of Polar Programs and the United States Department of Energy, with additional support from the Kavli Foundation and the Gordon and Betty Moore Foundation. Funding for the SPTpol and SPT-3G instruments and operations are also provided by the United States Department of Energy Office of Science, Office of High Energy Physics.

== Operations ==
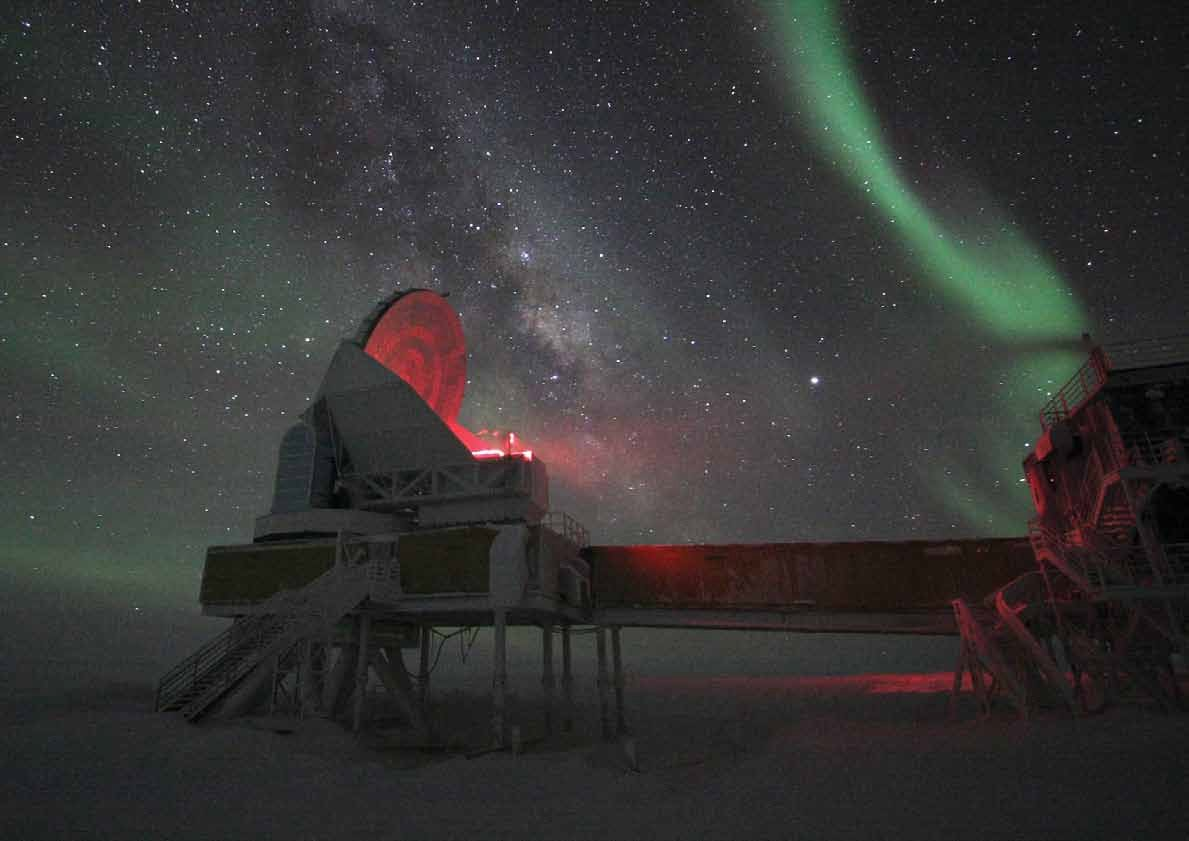
Telescope seen during polar night

On February 16, 2007 (19 years ago), the South Pole Telescope achieved first light. Formal science observations began in March 2007. Commissioning observations and an initial small survey were completed during austral winter 2007 with winter-overs Stephen Padin and Zak Staniszewski at its helm.

In 2008, larger survey fields were completed with winter-overs Keith Vanderlinde and Dana Hrubes, and in 2009 with winter-overs Erik Shirokoff and Ross Williamson.

In December 2009, the camera was upgraded again for the 2010 observing season. The full 2500 square-degree SPT-SZ survey was completed during the 2010 and 2011 observing seasons with winter-overs Dana Hrubes and Daniel Luong-Van.

First light (the first observation) with the SPTpol camera was achieved on January 27, 2012. During the first season of observations, the winterover crew, Cynthia Chiang and Nicholas Huang, took data on a 100 square degree survey field. 2013 winterovers Dana Hrubes and Jason Gallicchio surveyed a larger field as part of the full SPTpol survey. This larger survey was completed by 2014 winterovers Robert Citron and Nicholas Huang, 2015 winterovers Charlie Sievers and Todd Veach, and 2016 winterovers Christine Corbett Moran and Amy Lowitz. The first winter of SPT-3G observing was conducted by winterovers Daniel Michalik and Andrew Nadolski. Adam Jones and Joshua Montgomery followed in 2018, with Douglas Howe and David Riebel wintering in 2019, Geoff Chen and Allen Foster in 2020, Sasha Rahlin and Matt Young in 2021, Aman Chokshi and Allen Foster in 2022, Kyle Ferguson and Alex Pollak in 2023, Josh Veitch-Michaelis and Kevin Zagorski in 2024, Simeon Bash and Karia Dibert in 2025, and Michel Adamič and Anjali Sehrawat in 2026.

== See also ==
- BICEP and Keck Array
- Cosmological constant
- List of astronomical observatories
- Lists of telescopes
