= Bolometer =

Device for measuring incident electromagnetic radiation

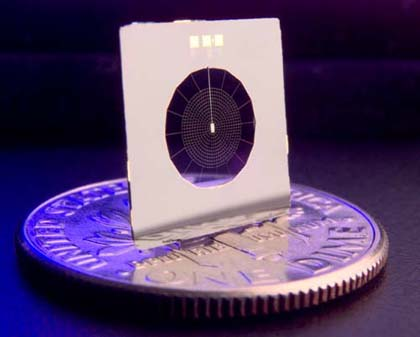
Spiderweb bolometer for measurements of the cosmic microwave background radiation. Image credit: NASA/JPL-Caltech.

A bolometer is a device for measuring radiant heat by means of a material having a temperature-dependent electrical resistance. It was invented in 1878 by the American astronomer Samuel Pierpont Langley.

== Principle of operation ==
Conceptual schematic of a bolometer. Power, P, from an incident signal is absorbed and heats up a thermal mass with heat capacity, C, and temperature, T. The thermal mass is connected to a reservoir of constant temperature through a link with thermal conductance, G. The temperature increase is ΔT = P/G and is measured with a resistive thermometer, allowing the determination of P. The intrinsic thermal time constant is τ = C/G.

A bolometer consists of an absorptive element, such as a thin layer of metal, connected to a thermal reservoir (a body of constant temperature) through a thermal link. The result is that any radiation impinging on the absorptive element raises its temperature above that of the reservoir – the greater the absorbed power, the higher the temperature. The intrinsic thermal time constant, which sets the speed of the detector, is equal to the ratio of the heat capacity of the absorptive element to the thermal conductance between the absorptive element and the reservoir. The temperature change can be measured directly with an attached resistive thermometer, or the resistance of the absorptive element itself can be used as a thermometer. Metal bolometers usually work without cooling. They are produced from thin foils or metal films. Today, most bolometers use semiconductor or superconductor absorptive elements rather than metals. These devices can be operated at cryogenic temperatures, enabling significantly greater sensitivity.

Bolometers are directly sensitive to the energy left inside the absorber. For this reason they can be used not only for ionizing particles and photons, but also for non-ionizing particles, any sort of radiation, and even to search for unknown forms of mass or energy (like dark matter); this lack of discrimination can also be a shortcoming. The most sensitive bolometers are very slow to reset (i.e., return to thermal equilibrium with the environment). On the other hand, compared to more conventional particle detectors, they are extremely efficient in energy resolution and in sensitivity. They are also known as thermal detectors. When coupled using quasi-optical or lithographic orthogonal mode transformers, they can be used to characterize the polarization state of light.

== Langley's bolometer ==
The first bolometers made by Langley consisted of two steel, platinum, or palladium foil strips covered with lampblack. One strip was shielded from radiation and one exposed to it. The strips formed two branches of a Wheatstone bridge which was fitted with a sensitive galvanometer and connected to a battery. Electromagnetic radiation falling on the exposed strip would heat it and change its resistance. By 1880, Langley's bolometer was refined enough to detect thermal radiation from a cow a quarter of a mile (400 m) away. This radiant-heat detector is sensitive to differences in temperature of one hundred-thousandth of a degree Celsius (0.00001 °C). This instrument enabled him to thermally detect across a broad spectrum, noting all the chief Fraunhofer lines. He also discovered new atomic and molecular absorption lines in the invisible infrared portion of the electromagnetic spectrum. Nikola Tesla personally asked Dr. Langley whether he could use his bolometer for his power transmission experiments in 1892. Thanks to that first use, he succeeded in making the first demonstration between West Point and his laboratory on Houston Street.

== Applications in astronomy ==
While bolometers can be used to measure radiation of any frequency, for most wavelength ranges there are other methods of detection that are more sensitive. For sub-millimeter wavelengths through millimeter wavelengths (from around 200 μm to a few mm wavelength, also known as the far-infrared, terahertz) bolometers are among the most sensitive available detectors, and are therefore used for astronomy at these wavelengths. To achieve the best sensitivity, they must be cooled to a fraction of a degree above absolute zero (typically from 50 mK to 300 mK). Notable examples of bolometers employed in submillimeter astronomy include the Boomerang experiment, the Herschel Space Observatory, the James Clerk Maxwell Telescope, and the Stratospheric Observatory for Infrared Astronomy (SOFIA). Recent examples of bolometers employed in millimeter-wavelength astronomy are AdvACT, BICEP array, the Spider sub-orbital experiment, SPT-3G and the HFI camera on the Planck satellite, as well as the planned Simons Observatory, CMB-S4 experiment, and LiteBIRD satellite.

== Applications in particle physics ==
The term bolometer is also used in particle physics to designate an unconventional particle detector. They use the same principle described above. The bolometers are sensitive not only to light but to every form of energy. The operating principle is similar to that of a calorimeter in thermodynamics. However, the approximations, ultra low temperature, and the different purpose of the device make the operational use rather different. In the jargon of high energy physics, these devices are not called "calorimeters", since this term is already used for a different type of detector (see Calorimeter). Their use as particle detectors was proposed from the beginning of the 20th century, but the first regular, though pioneering, use was only in the 1980s because of the difficulty associated with cooling and operating a system at cryogenic temperature. They can still be considered to be at the developmental stage.

== Applications in plasma physics ==
Bolometers play a pivotal role in monitoring radiation in fusion plasmas. The Wendelstein 7-X (W7-X) stellarator employs a two-camera bolometer system to capture plasma radiation. This setup is optimized to identify 2D radiation distributions within a symmetrical triangular plasma cross-section. Recent progress includes the refinement of a tomographic reconstruction algorithm, which leans on the principle of relative gradient smoothing (RGS) of emission profiles. This has been effectively applied to the W7-X hydrogen discharges powered by electron cyclotron resonance heating (ECRH). In terms of hardware, the W7-X bolometers are equipped with metal-resistive detectors. These are distinguished by a 5 μm thick gold absorber, sized 1.3 mm in the poloidal direction and 3.8 mm toroidally, mounted on a ceramic (silicon nitride Si3N4) substrate. The inclusion of a 50 nm carbon layer is strategic, enhancing the detection efficiency for low-energy photons. These detectors are notably attuned to impurity line radiation, covering a spectrum from the very ultraviolet (VUV) to soft x-rays (SXR). Given their resilience and innovative design, they are being considered as prototypes for the upcoming ITER bolometer detectors.

== Microbolometers ==
A microbolometer is a specific type of bolometer used as a detector in a thermal camera. It is a grid of vanadium oxide or amorphous silicon heat sensors atop a corresponding grid of silicon. Infrared radiation from a specific range of wavelengths strikes the vanadium oxide or amorphous silicon, and changes its electrical resistance. This resistance change is measured and processed into temperatures which can be represented graphically. The microbolometer grid is commonly found in three sizes, a 640×480 array, a 320×240 array (384×288 amorphous silicon) or less expensive 160×120 or 80×60 array. 640x512 VOx arrays are commonly used in static security camera applications with low shock resistance requirements. Different arrays provide the same resolution with larger array providing a wider field of view. Larger, 1024×768 arrays were announced in 2008.

== Hot electron bolometer ==
The hot electron bolometer (HEB) operates at cryogenic temperatures, typically within a few degrees of absolute zero. At these very low temperatures, the electron system in a metal is weakly coupled to the phonon system. Power coupled to the electron system drives it out of thermal equilibrium with the phonon system, creating hot electrons. Phonons in the metal are typically well-coupled to substrate phonons and act as a thermal reservoir. In describing the performance of the HEB, the relevant heat capacity is the electronic heat capacity and the relevant thermal conductance is the electron-phonon thermal conductance.

If the resistance of the absorbing element depends on the electron temperature, then the resistance can be used as a thermometer of the electron system. This is the case for both semiconducting and superconducting materials at low temperature. If the absorbing element does not have a temperature-dependent resistance, as is typical of normal (non-superconducting) metals at very low temperature, then an attached resistive thermometer can be used to measure the electron temperature.

== Microwave measurement ==
A bolometer can be used to measure power at microwave frequencies. In this application, a resistive element is exposed to microwave power. A DC bias current is applied to the resistor to raise its temperature via Joule heating, such that the resistance is matched to the waveguide characteristic impedance. After applying microwave power, the bias current is reduced to return the bolometer to its resistance in the absence of microwave power. The change in the dc power is then equal to the absorbed microwave power. To reject the effect of ambient temperature changes, the active (measuring) element is in a bridge circuit with an identical element not exposed to microwaves; variations in temperature common to both elements do not affect the accuracy of the reading. The average response time of the bolometer allows convenient measurement of the power of a pulsed source.

In 2020, two groups reported microwave bolometers based on graphene-based materials capable of microwave detection at the single-photon level.

== See also ==
- Thermocouple
- Scintillating bolometer
- Pyrometer
- Radiometer
- Tasimeter
- Thermistor
- Pyrheliometer
- Infrared sensing in snakes The structure and function of a pit organ has similarities to a bolometer.
