= Spider (polarimeter) =

Balloon-borne astronomical experiment

- Altitude: 36 km (118,000 ft)
- Wavelength: 3, 2, 1.1 mm (100, 150, 273 GHz)
- Mass: 3.5 t (3,500 kg)
- Website: spider.princeton.edu

Spider is a balloon-borne experiment designed to search for primordial gravitational waves imprinted on the cosmic microwave background (CMB). Measuring the strength of this signal puts limits on inflationary theory.

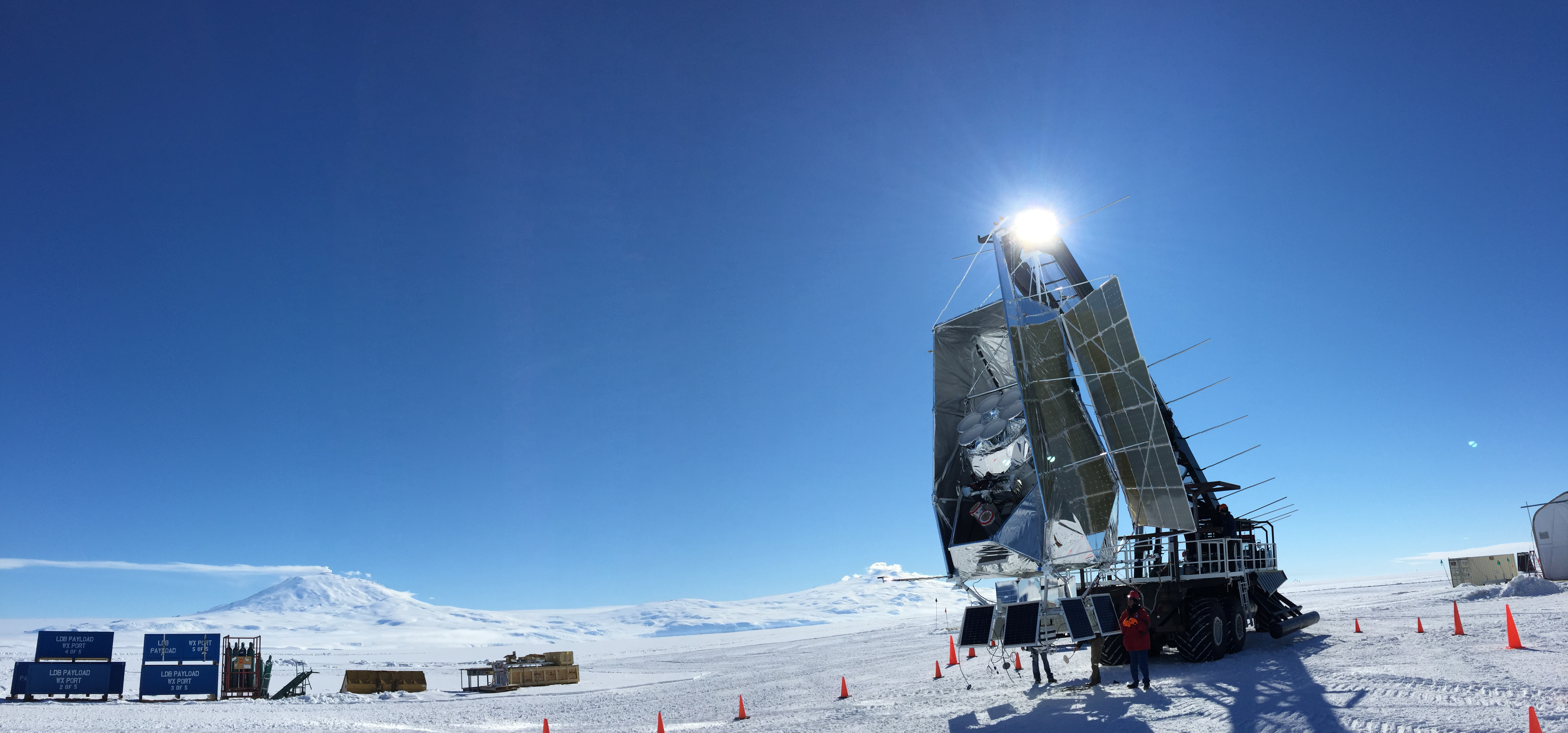
The Spider experiment hanging from the launch vehicle prior to its first flight over Antarctica on January 1, 2015.

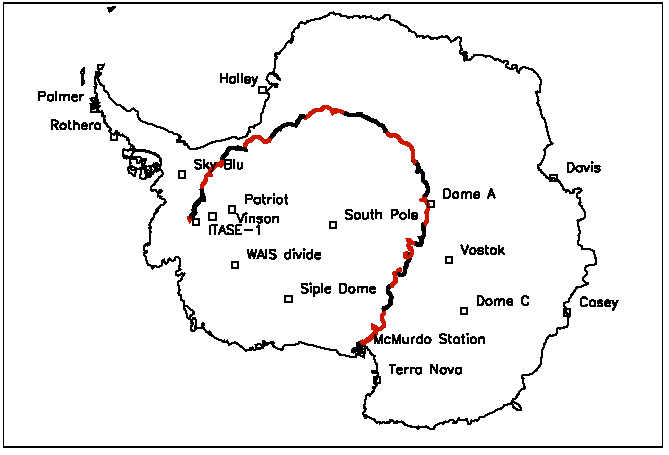
Map of SPIDER’s flight (Jan 1-17, 2015) - originated from McMurdo Station

The Spider instrument consists of six half degree-resolution telescopes cooled to liquid Helium temperature (4 K) which observe at frequencies of 100 GHz, 150 GHz, and 280 GHz (corresponding to wavelengths of 3 mm, 2 mm, and 1.1 mm). Each telescope is coupled to a polarisation-sensitive transition-edge bolometer (TES) array cooled to 300 mK. Spider was the first instrument to successfully demonstrate time-domain multiplexed TES detectors in a space-like environment. At the time of the first flight over Antarctica in 2015, Spider was the most sensitive microwave instrument ever made.

The primary science goals include:

1. characterization of the curl-free component of the CMB polarization on the largest scales
2. searching for the signature of inflationary gravitational waves in the CMB polarization
3. characterization of the polarization properties of the emission from our own Milky Way Galaxy

The first balloon flight of the experiment launched on January 1, 2015 at 16:59 local time (03:59 GMT) from McMurdo Station, Antarctica, with support from NASA's Columbia Scientific Balloon Facility. This Long Duration Balloon flight lasted for about 17 days, mapping about 10% of the full sky. The flight computers containing data from SPIDER's 1st flight could be recovered from the landing site, some 2,300 km (1,500 miles) from McMurdo Station with help of British Antarctic Survey (BAS) based out of Rothera Station, nearly 1000 miles from the landing site, after nearly three weeks of SPIDER'S landing.

The instrument was upgraded with 280 GHz cameras developed by NIST, and flew a second mission in December 2022. The data from these flight produced high signal-to-noise images of the intensity and linear polarization of the Cosmic Microwave Background, with noise levels 3—5 times lower than the Planck spacecraft in the same region of the sky, resulting in precise measurements of the CMB and Galactic foreground radiation, as well as a robust limit on the cosmological tensor-to-scalar ratio. The data provided the first detection of spatial variation in the spectral energy density of polarized Galactic dust emission.
