= CU Spaceflight =

Student-run society at Cambridge University

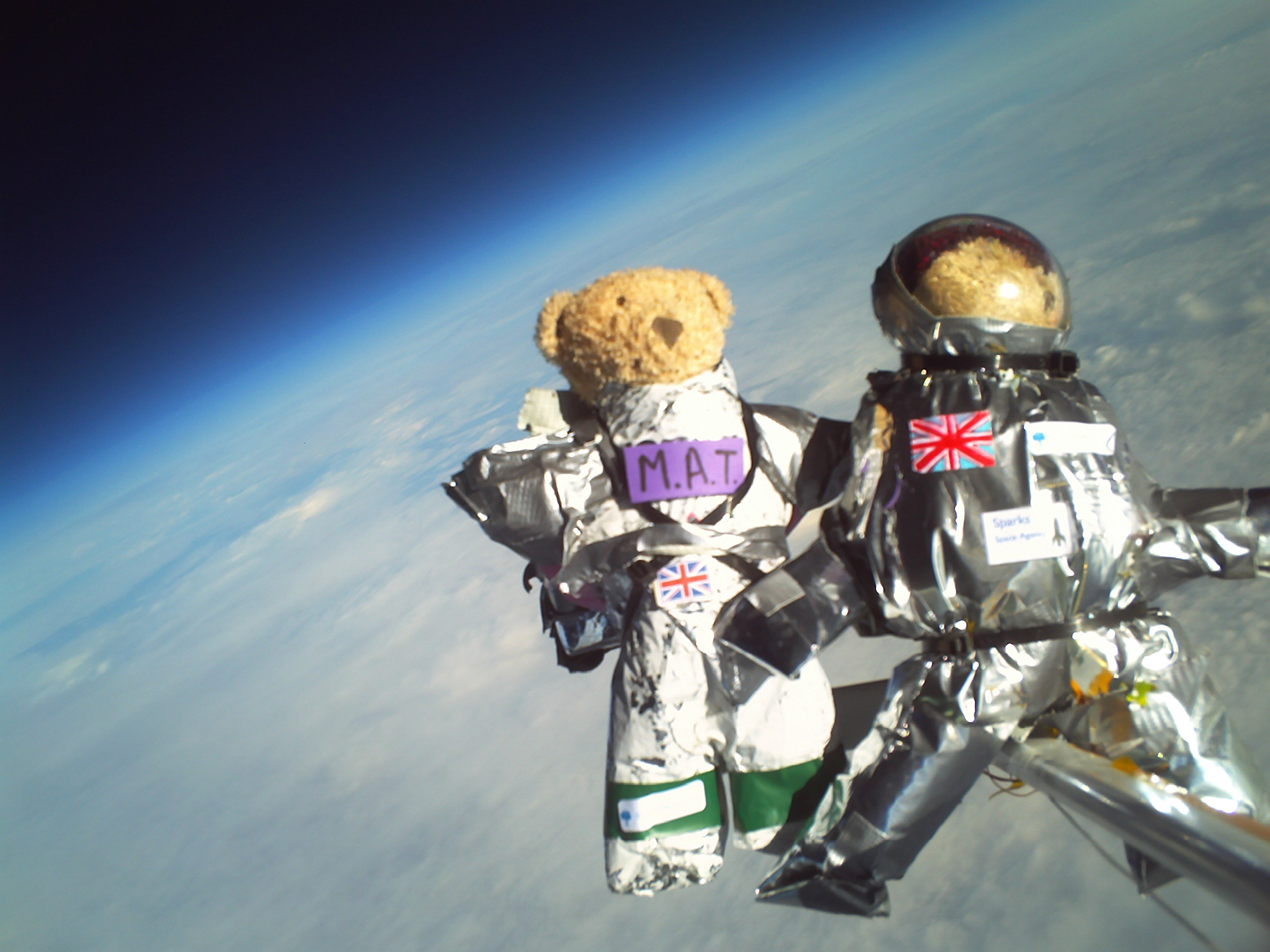
Teddy bears lifted to 30,085 metres above sea level on a helium balloon in a materials experiment by CU Spaceflight and SPARKS science club. Each of the bears wore a different space suit designed by 11- to 13-year-olds from SPARKS.

CU Spaceflight is a student-run society at the University of Cambridge. It is founded with the aim of achieving access to space, with minimal financial expenses. The society is supported by the Cambridge-MIT Institute.

== History ==
The society was founded in the summer of 2006, with the specific goal of launching a rocket into space for less than GBP£1000.

As of November, 2007, CU Spaceflight has launched five non-crewed high-altitude balloons, of which two were not successful: Nova 2 was blown into the North Sea and Nova 5 failed to ignite the Martlet 1 solid rocket motor, but landed in a reusable state.

CU Spaceflight is a participant of the UK High Altitude Society.

=== Owlstone Photography Prize ===
This photo from the Nova 1 flight, entitled "Earth from 32 km", won the Owlstone Photography Prize for 2007

On 27 June 2007, CU Spaceflight won the Owlstone Photography Prize, having submitted an unenhanced photograph from the Nova 1 flight, displaying the curvature of the Earth as seen from Near space. The entry was entitled "Earth from 32 km". CU Spaceflight won a cash prize and 25-hours of workshop time.

== Projects ==
As of 2007, Cambridge University Spaceflight has three projects which it is pursuing; all three are critical to the long-term goal of successfully launching a rocket into space and retrieving it.

=== Nova ===
Nova is CU Spaceflight's first project and has the objective of launching high-altitude balloons on test flights to near space. The lifting gas used is helium.

Mission Name	Launch Date	Notes
Nova 0	N/A	Prototype for the Nova programme, and never flew, despite being capable of doing so.
Nova 1	9 November 2006	Launched from Cambridge, UK. It reached a maximum altitude of 32 kilometres (105,000 feet) and landed by parachute 3 hours later. Following recovery, 857 still images were downloaded from the on-board cameras.
Nova 2	19 November 2006	The near spacecraft suffered a mechanical failure and was blown off into the North Sea by high winds. All contact was lost and it has yet to be recovered. Nova 2 was the first unsuccessful mission in the Nova programme.
Nova 3	21 January 2007	It was originally intended to carry a UK High Altitude Society payload consisting of several modules, but electronic failures prevented this from being the case. Nova 3 served as a test flight for a cutdown mechanism, and was located in Germany on 23 January 2007. The payload was arranged to be sent back to CU Spaceflight.
Nova 4	7 March 2007	Concept demonstrator for a launch platform for the Martlet 1 rocket. The payload carried included all components necessary to fire a rocket except the rocket itself. The mission reached 20 kilometres, and landed at 8 m/s.
Nova 5	24 March 2007	Launched from the Cavendish Laboratory at the University of Cambridge, into overcast cloud. It was launched in front of a crowd at the Cambridge Science Week (as part of CU Spaceflight's outreach programme). It was intended to fire the Martlet 1 rocket, but the igniter failed and the rocket never left the balloon. Both vehicles were recovered on 12 April 2007, in a fully reusable state. Following the unsuccessful mission, CU Spaceflight announced they would be working towards their next Martlet launch with the MIT Rocket Team, an MIT student society also aimed at cheap space access.
Nova 6	24 July 2008	After an extended period of not launching due to insurance difficulties, CU Spaceflight returned the Nova programme to flight with the launch of Nova 6. After analysis of GPS data logs after a successful landing, it was officially confirmed that Nova 6 had broken Nova 1's altitude record, thus setting a new British record (Nova 1 was the prior record holder), about 260 metres higher than that of the first flight.
Nova 7	25 July 2008	The high-altitude balloon was launched shortly after 3:30 AM BST. The near spacecraft was successfully recovered.
Nova 8	28 August 2008	Launched 4:07 AM BST; dawn launch. Successfully videoed and photographed sunrise from high altitude, a major mission objective. Recovered less than a kilometre from software-predicted landing site.
Nova 9	1 December 2008	Launched in collaboration with Parkside School carrying 4 teddies wearing spacesuits designed by students up to 30 kilometres. This launch received significant press coverage around the world.

=== Meteor ===
Meteor is a project designed to provide a landing system for falling body to a 100-metre accuracy, from any point within the Earth's atmosphere. The Meteor project will use a paraglider to land objects.

=== Martlet ===
Martlet is the project aimed at the development of a small rocket and launch system which can be launched from a Nova balloon in the upper atmosphere.

CU Spaceflight aim the final Martlet rocket to be less than 1 metre long, weigh 3.5 kilograms, and carry a 0.5 kg payload. The intended cost per launch is less than GBP£1000. The rocket will be a solid-fuel rocket. Its objective is to reach suborbital space – i.e. reaching altitudes in excess of 100 km (the boundary of space).

The idea of a balloon-launched rocket – a rockoon – is not new, but is rarely practiced. The incentives for air-based launch are that the altitude the balloons reach are in the near space region – which is above 99% of the atmosphere – thus resulting in significantly less atmospheric drag, requiring far less rocket fuel.

Mission Name	Launch Date	Notes
Martlet 0	1 March 2009	A successful ground launch of a prototype for the final Martlet rocket. It was launched at the EARS rocketry site reaching a height just under 9,000 ft and a speed of around the speed of sound. The rocket motor used was a commercial J-class motor, however the rocket casing is designed for a motor with three times the power.

== Press coverage ==
Since its inception, Cambridge University Spaceflight has been covered by several major news sources, including The Guardian and BBC News.

Photos from the Nova 9 launch were printed in many national newspapers including The Times, The Daily Telegraph and The Daily Mail. Members of the team also gave interviews to the Discovery Channel, Sky News and the BBC World Service.

== Recognition ==
Following the success of Nova 1 and the announcement of the Martlet and Meteor projects, CU Spaceflight has received interest from the university's Department for Atmospheric Chemistry and the British Antarctic Survey on the results of its work.

== Outreach ==
CU Spaceflight has performed talks in secondary schools in and around Cambridge, UK, and continues to offer to do so, hoping to raise the profile of engineering and aerospace in particular.

During the 2007 Cambridge Science Festival, CU Spaceflight launched their Nova 5 balloon in front of a large crowd.

== See also ==
- High-altitude balloon
- Amateur rocketry
- Spaceflight
