= Paragon Space Development Corporation =

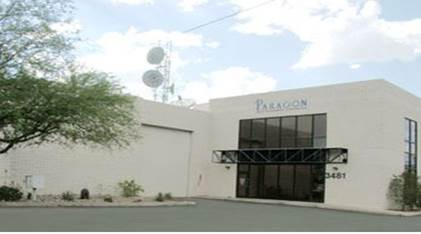
Paragon Facility, Tucson, AZ

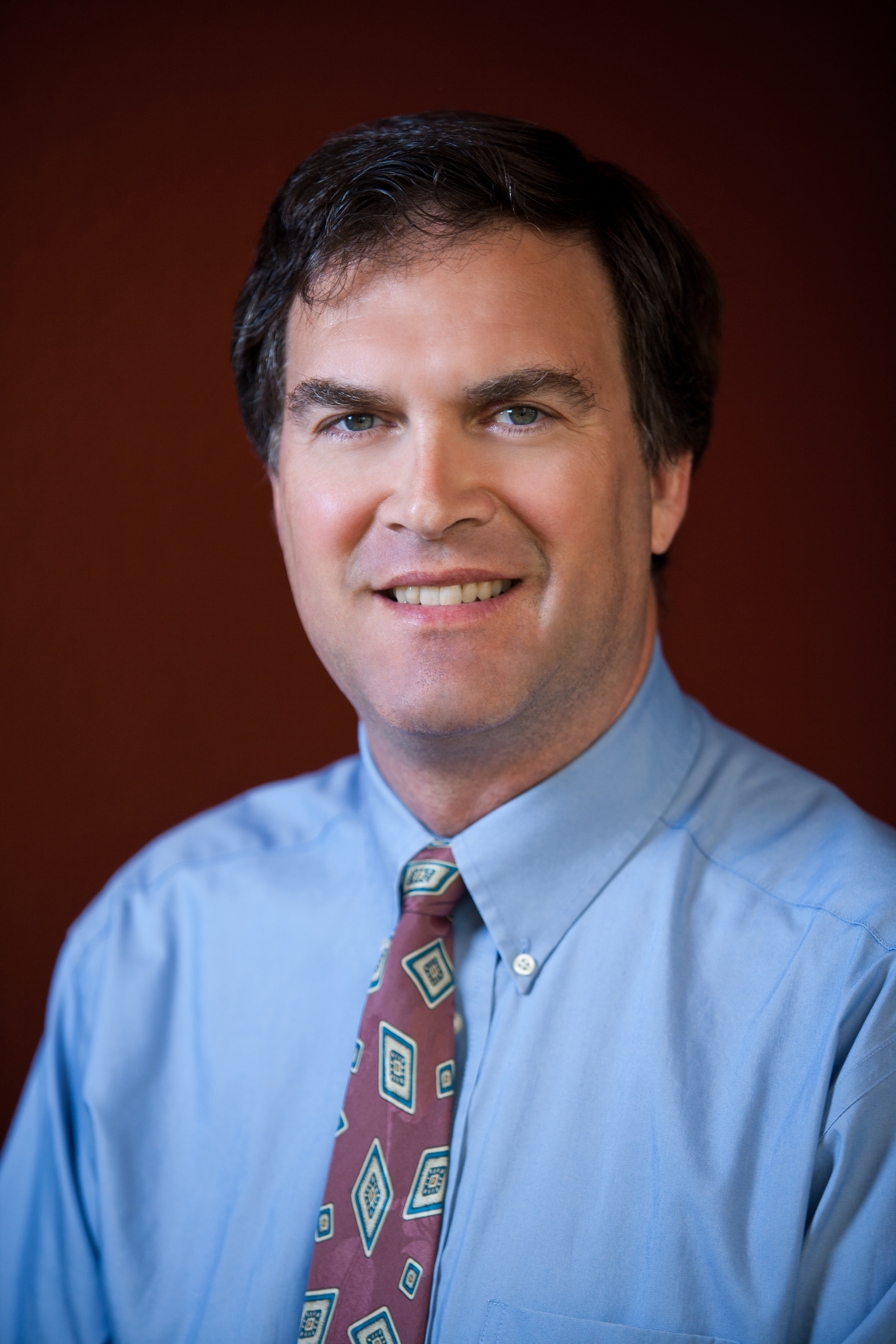
Grant Anderson, President and CEO, Paragon Space Development Corporation

Paragon Space Development Corporation is an American company headquartered in Tucson, Arizona. Paragon is a provider of environmental controls for extreme and hazardous environments. They design, build, test and operate life-support systems and leading thermal-control products for astronauts, contaminated water divers, and other extreme environment explorers, as well as for uncrewed space and terrestrial applications.

== History ==
Paragon was conceived to combine the expertise of biology, chemistry and aerospace engineering to develop technical solutions to life support and thermal control problems related to human and biological spaceflight.

Paragon was founded by six principal partners including Grant Anderson, Taber MacCallum, Jane Poynter, Dave Bearden, Max Nelson, and Alicia (Cesa) Pederson.

Prior to co-founding Paragon, Anderson was employed at Lockheed Martin, Sunnyvale, California, MacCallum and Poynter were members of Biosphere 2 in Oracle, Arizona, David was at The Aerospace Corporation, El Segundo, California, (where he is still employed), Max was at the RAND Corporation, and Cesa was a manager at Lockheed Martin. MacCallum served as CEO of Paragon from its inception until his move to serve as chief technology officer of World View Enterprises, Inc., a company incubated by Paragon. Jane, formerly president and chairman of the Board of Paragon and Former World View CEO, and Taber are now co-CEO's of Space Perspective. Taber, Max, David and Grant had all previously attended International Space University Summer Sessions, through which they became connected.

== Current projects ==
- Paragon is providing the CST-100 Humidity Control Subassembly (HCS) for cabin atmospheric humidity control of the Boeing Crew Space Transportation System (CCTS) and Crew Space Transportation (CST)-100 spacecraft.
- Paragon, a Lockheed Martin subcontractor on the NASA Orion program, provided the tubing for life-support systems including oxygen, heating and cooling and critical sensor packages for the EFT-1 flight.
- Paragon is partnered with Oceaneering Space Systems to build an exploration EVA space suit which will be demonstrated at ISS and will enable NASA's future exploration missions. Paragon is leading the thermal design and analysis effort, and is providing components for the portable life support system.
- Paragon is under contract with Mars One to develop concepts for life support and spacesuits, with the goal of a human colony on Mars.

== History ==
=== 2012 ===
- In March 2012, Paragon announced that its NASA-funded air revitalization technology would be used in mine refuge chambers.

=== 2013 ===
- In February 2013, Paragon announced its involvement with the Inspiration Mars foundation and their mission to launch an historic journey to Mars and back in 501 days.
- In March 2013, Paragon announced that it had entered into a Space Act Agreement with NASA for Inspiration Mars Evaluation
- In March 2013, Paragon announced that it had contracted with Mars One to perform an initial conceptual design of the Environmental Control and Life Support System (ECLSS) and Mars Surface Exploration Spacesuit System.

=== 2014 ===
- In June 2014, Paragon announced that its offshoot company, World View Enterprises, Inc., successfully completed a scaled systems test of the proposed nominal tourist flight profile to nearspace. World View uses a high-altitude balloon to rise to 32 km (20 miles) above the earth, after which it returns gently back down to earth beneath a remotely guided parafoil. Although not reaching space, the curvature of the Earth and the blackness of space can be seen. Commercial flights are expected to cost $75,000.
- In September 2014, Paragon was selected by NASA to integrate and fly technology payloads on commercial suborbital reusable platforms that carry payloads near the boundary of space.
- On October 24, 2014, Paragon along with Alan Eustace and the Paragon StratEx team completed a record-breaking near-space dive from an altitude of over 135,000 feet.
- On November 3, 2014, Paragon announced that Grant Anderson was named president and CEO and Ron Sable was named chairman of the board while Jane Poynter and Taber MacCallum had fully transitioned to World View Enterprises, Inc.

=== 2022 ===
- In January 2022, Paragon announces its agreement to acquire Final Frontier Designs and enter the spacesuit market.
- In June 2022, Paragon is recognized as a partner under Axiom Space to develop spacesuit technology under the xEVAS contract.

== See also ==
- Commercial Crew Development
- Environmental Control and Life Support Systems
- Mars One
- NASA
