= Station keeping =

Station keeping may refer to:

- Orbital station-keeping, maneuvers used to keep a spacecraft in an assigned orbit
- Nautical stationkeeping, maintaining a seagoing vessel in a position relative to other vessels or a fixed point
- Atmospheric station-keeping, maintaining an airborne vehicle, in a certain region in the sky relative to the earth
