= PongSat =

PongSats are high-altitude near space missions that hold a probe or other project that can fit inside a ping-pong (table tennis) ball. The launch program is run by a volunteer organization, JP Aerospace (which also provided balloon launch services for the Space Chair.)

JP Aerospace succeeded in its first launch of PongSat missions, with a balloon-launched rocket (AKA a rockoon), at the West Texas Spaceport near Fort Stockton, in October 2002. The launcher reached 100,000 ft (30 km) with 64 hosted PongSats.

Many of the flights have been funded through a KickStarter crowdfunding campaign. Although many PongSats contain things like food items, simply because schoolchildren are curious about the result, other missions include "multiple sensors and complex mini-computers". It's been described by its founder as part of "America's Other Space Program," but also as one that relies "primarily on volunteers and helium." SpaceHub Southeast has organized several PongSat flights from Atlanta.

According to founder John Powell, the PongSat launch program is very global, with payloads delivered to JP Aerospace from "Poland, India, Japan, Slovenia, Germany, Belgium, Turkey, China, Australia, Indonesia."
