= SpaceHub Southeast =

American non-profit organization

Space Hub Southeast
- Company type: Not-for-profit Organization
- Founder: Meryl Mccurry, Beau Martin
- Headquarters: Atlanta, Ga, United States
- Area served: International
- Website: spacehubsoutheast.com

SpaceHub Southeast (SHSE) is a not for profit organization based in Atlanta, GA. The organization sends experiments to the upper atmosphere via high altitude weather balloon on a semi-regular basis. Most notably, the organization's STEM (Science, Technology, Engineering, Mathematics) outreach program allows students and the general public to send PongSat experiments to the upper atmosphere free of charge.

== Overview & History ==
SpaceHub Southeast was cofounded in Atlanta, Georgia, in 2012 by Beau Martin and Meryl Mccurry with the mission to provide access to the upper atmosphere to the general public.

=== PongSat Program ===
PongSat stands for ping-pong satellite and consists of any experiment that can be contained within a ping-pong ball. Projects range from things as simple as a marshmallow to programmed circuit boards. Not all PongSats are scientific, some are purely artistic. The program does have restrictions:

- Anything that sticks out of a PongSat must be pre-approved
- No volatile chemicals
- No combustion reactions etc.
- May not be heavier than 3 oz.
- Any device that emits a radio signal must be pre-approved

== Partnerships ==
=== ZPM Espresso ===
Space Hub Southeast and ZPM Espresso partnered in 2013 to send the first whole bean espresso coffee into space. The partnership resulted in special balloon launch carrying one pound of whole bean coffee to the upper stratosphere, which was then brewed and consumed. ZPM commented that the espresso tasted 'Gross' and lacked flavor.

=== The Westminster Schools ===
The Westminster Schools has served as the launch venue for the PongSat launches since 2012.

=== TinyCircuits ===
TinyCircuits produced the 'TinyDuino' Board, "an Arduino compatible board in an ultra compact package". Space Hub Southeast has worked with TinyCircuits in making these board available for free to select PongSat students. The Space Hub Southeast TinyDuino Scholarship provides students with the opportunity to apply for a TinyCircuits TinyDuino, free of charge.

=== Omnilink ===
Since 2013 Omnilink has provided Space Hub Southeast with an OM210™ system that they use to track the high altitude payload. The device is extremely durable and has been unaffected by the harsh environment. Space Hub Southeast has been featured on Omnilink's home page.
