= Taber MacCallum =

American entrepreneur

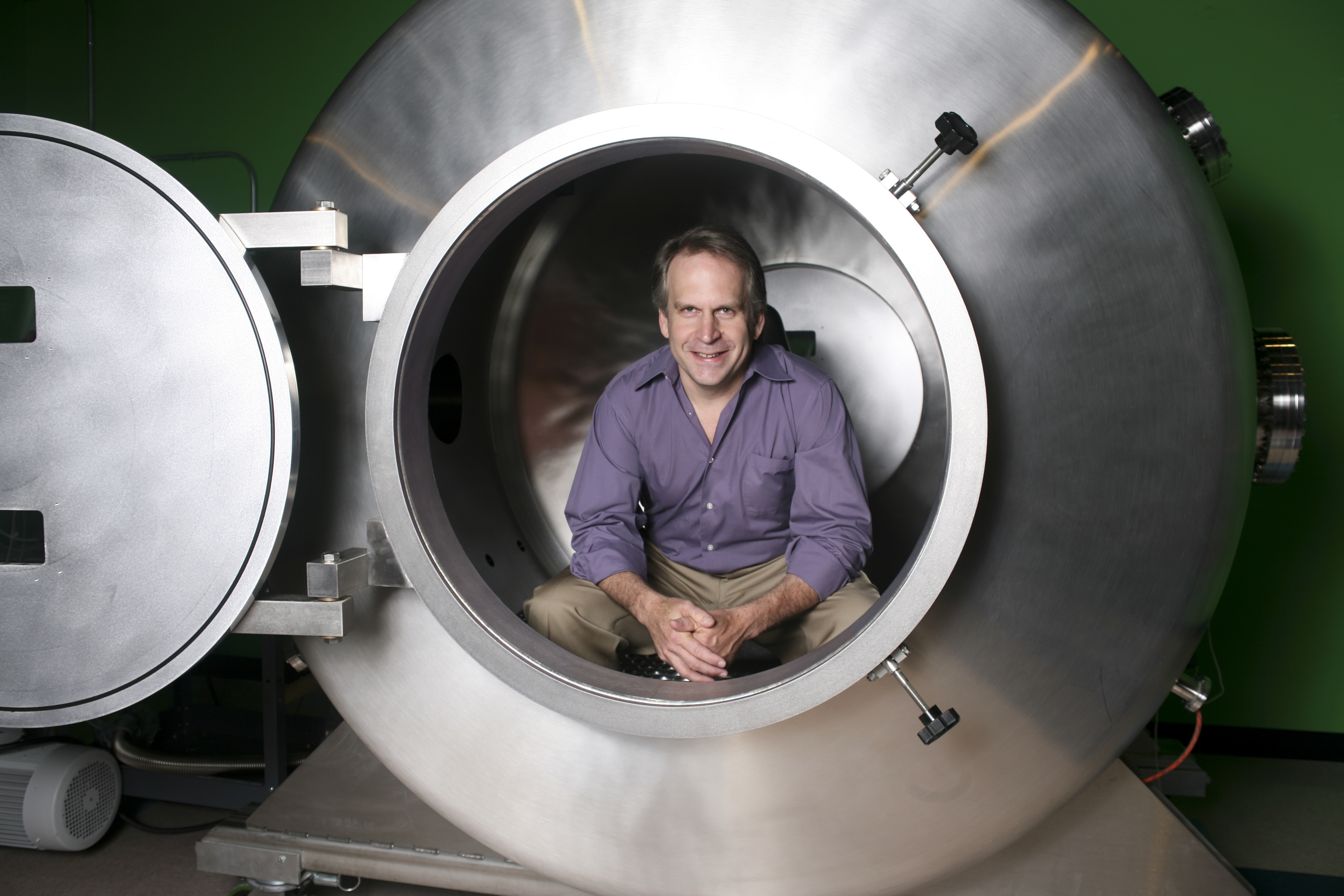
Taber MacCallum

Taber MacCallum is an American entrepreneur who is the co-founder and co-CEO of Space Perspective, a human spaceflight company planning to take people and payloads to the edge of space by balloon, and the former chairman of the Commercial Spaceflight Federation (CSF). He is co-founder and former CTO of World View Enterprises, a stratospheric balloon company using its uncrewed Stratollite for remote communications and sensing. MacCallum was also a founding member of the Biosphere 2 design team and a crew member of the original two-year mission inside the materially closed ecological system.

Prior to World View, MacCallum served as co-founder, CEO and CTO of Paragon Space Development Corporation, a designer and manufacturer of hazardous environment life support equipment. During his tenure at Paragon, MacCallum served as the CTO and safety officer for Alan Eustace's world record altitude skydive, a project that launched Eustace to 135,899 ft (25.74 mi; 41.42 km) under a helium balloon in 2014. He also served as Chief Technology Officer for Inspiration Mars Foundation, which detailed plans for an almost two-year fly-by mission around Mars with two crew members, and published performance data from a complete life support system hardware demonstration, demonstrating recycling of wastewater and oxygen.

== Career ==
=== Space Perspective ===
Space Perspective is a high-altitude flight tourism company, founded and incorporated in 2019 by Taber MacCallum and Jane Poynter with plans to launch its nine-person "Spaceship Neptune" crewed balloon from the MS Voyager.

On June 18, 2020, Space Perspective announced plans to balloon passengers to nearly 100,000 feet (30,000 m) or around 19 miles (31 km) above the surface of the Earth for roughly US$125,000 per ticket.

On December 2, 2020, Space Perspective closed its seed funding round with US$7 million gathered. The company planned an uncrewed test flight in the first half of 2021 and crewed operational flights by the end of 2024.

=== World View ===
World View Enterprises, doing business as World View, is a private American near-space exploration and technology company headquartered in Tucson, Arizona, and was co-founded by MacCallum and Jane Poynter in 2012. The goal being to increase access to and the utilization of the stratosphere for scientific, commercial, and economic purposes.

==== The Stratollite ====
The Stratollite is a remotely operated, navigable, uncrewed stratospheric flight vehicle designed and engineered to station-keep over customer-specified areas of interest for long periods of time (days, weeks, and months). The Stratollite uses proprietary altitude control technology to rise and lower in the stratosphere, harnessing natural stratospheric winds to provide point-to-point navigation and loitering. The Stratollite operates at altitudes up to 95,000 feet (29 km; 18.0 mi) with a payload capacity of 50 kilograms (110 lb) and 250 watts (0.34 hp) of continuous power to payloads. The Stratollite is primarily used for applications including remote sensing, communications, and weather.

=== Paragon Space Development Corporation ===
Taber co-founded Paragon in 1993 and served as CEO for over 20 years. He was the Principal Investigator on four microgravity experiments on the Space Shuttle, Mir Space Station, and International Space Station using Paragon's patented Autonomous Biological System, a long-duration plant and aquatic animal life support system, and has supported numerous other biological experiments on the Space Shuttle and International Space Station. He conceived and was involved in the design of a Mars space suit portable life support system technology funded by NASA, life support and thermal control systems for commercial crewed orbital and suborbital spacecraft, as well as hazardous environment life support technology for U.S. Navy divers. In 2008, Popular Science named MacCallum Inventor of the Year.

=== Biosphere 2 ===
Prior to Paragon, MacCallum was a founding member of the Biosphere 2 Design, Development, Test, and Operations team, and a crew member in the first two-year mission.

MacCallum's training for Biosphere 2 led him to work on a research vessel, eventually holding every level of command, sailing to over 40 ports and over 30,000 nautical miles (56,000 km; 35,000 mi) around the world. Training in Singapore, he became certified as a dive controller and Advanced Open Water Diving Instructor. He served as dive master for a project to reintroduce two captive dolphins to the wild.
