= Space Perspective =

American private high-altitude balloons tourism company

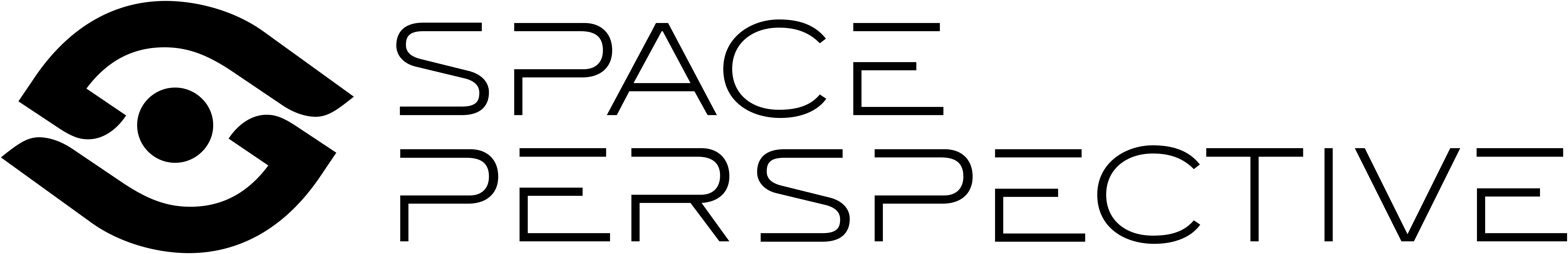
- Type: Subsidiary
- Industry: Aerospace
- Founded: 2021
- Founder: Jane Poynter and Taber MacCallum
- Headquarters: Titusville, Florida, United States
- Number of employees: 140 (2024)
- Parent: Eos X Space
- Website: spacevip.com/space-perspective-space-experiences-spaceship-neptune

Space Perspective is a private American aerospace manufacturer and subsidiary which is building crewed high-altitude balloons for near space tourism. The company, headquartered in Titusville, Florida, is developing Spaceship Neptune, a pressurized gondola lofted by a SpaceBalloon, a large hydrogen high-altitude balloon.

The company was in financial turmoil from January 2025, resulting in the organization being acquired in July 2025 by competitor Eos X Space, a balloon flight company based in Spain.

== History ==
Space Perspective was founded by married couple Jane Poynter and Taber MacCallum in 2018. Poynter and MacCallum who had met on the first Biosphere 2 mission and had previously founded the Paragon Space Development Corporation and World View Enterprises, a company which similarly to Space Perspective planned to take tourists to the stratosphere in high altitude balloons. Nevertheless, as World Views Enterprises' focus shifted from tourism to building uncrewed stratostats, Poynter and MacCallum spun off Space Perspective as a separate company.

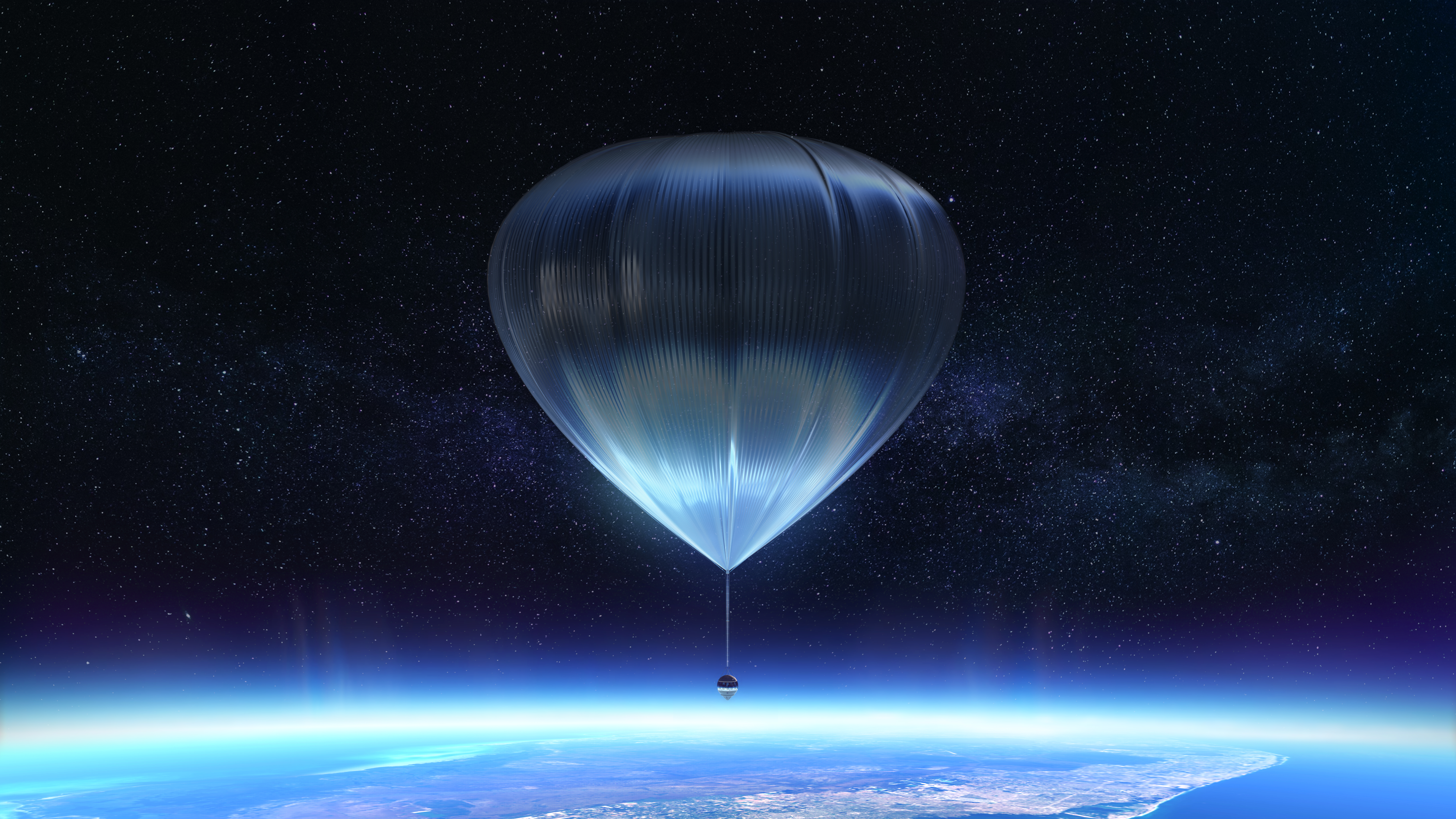
Rendered image of Spaceship Neptune in 2022

In 2021, the company flew an uncrewed test flight of their high altitude balloon, including a mass simulator of their pressurized gondola, Spaceship Neptune, and announced initial ticket prices of US$125,000. In October 2021, the company announced it had raised 40 million dollars in its Series A round of financing. In 2023, the company announced it had booked 1,600 tickets, and began construction on its first Spaceship Neptune gondola.

After finishing construction of the first Spaceship Neptune gondola in February 2024, the company flew the gondola for the first time in September 2024 on an uncrewed test flight, launching and recovering the gondola on the company's leased platform supply vessel MS Voyager. In October 2024, Richard Branson had invested and it was announced he would co-pilot the first crewed launch in 2025.

=== Financial turmoil and acquisition ===
In January 2025, the future of the company was thrown into doubt after it was revealed that the company owes US$90,295 in unpaid rent to Space Coast Regional Airport. Later, CEO Michael Savage confirmed that the company was experiencing financial difficulties and had furloughed 75% of its employees while seeking new investors. The company was served an eviction notice by the Space Coast Regional Airport on 17 January 2025. Space Perspectives' financial issues has been attributed by former employees to both the decision to spend equal amounts of money on marketing and development and the mismanagement of funds.

By April 2025, observers including Travel Weekly had assessed the company as having effectively ceased operations, with travel agencies having not heard from the company since January. Nevertheless, in July 2025 the company was purchased by Spanish aerospace manufacturer Eos X Space, who planned to build stratospheric tourism balloons of their own. Eos X Space has said that Space Perspective will "operate with full autonomy, under U.S. leadership and corporate structure".

== Hardware ==
=== Spaceship Neptune ===
Spaceship Neptune is the company's crewed pressurized gondola designed for near space tourism. The spherical carbon-composite gondola measures 16 ft (4.9 m) in diameter and provides 2,000 ft^{2} (190 m^{2}) of pressurized volume for up to eight passengers and one captain. The gondola is lined with a thin transparent vacuum deposited UV-reflective coating, and features an array of fifteen 52 in (130 cm) windows. The interior of the gondola includes a washroom named the "Space Spa" by the company, eight seats and a bar within what the company calls a "Space Lounge". The gondola includes four reverse parachutes in case the balloon is unable to descend, and a device named the Splashcone designed to both soften the impact of the planned water landings as well as flood to provide ballast.

Spaceship Neptune is lofted into the stratosphere by a high-altitude balloon called SpaceBalloon. When inflated, the SpaceBalloon is filled with over 24×10^{6} ft^{3} (680,000 m^{3}) of hydrogen and stands approximately 550 ft (170 m) tall. The company plans to launch and recover the gondola and balloon at sea, using the MS Voyager platform supply vessel.

Despite being marketed as a spacecraft and being considered as such by the Federal Aviation Administration, the vehicle's apogee of 30 km (19 mi) only reaches the stratosphere and falls short of the 100 km (62 mi) Kármán line, the conventional definition of space.

==== Excelsior ====
The first Spaceship Neptune, the prototype balloon gondola Excelsior was launched in September 2024 on a successful uncrewed high altitude test flight to 100,000 feet (30,000 m).

=== Marine Spaceports ===
Space Perspective plans to use a ship to launch and recover the balloon at sea. These mothership balloon tenders are called marine spaceports.

==== MS Voyager ====
The Marine Spaceport Voyager, the first marine spaceport, is a converted platform supply vessel. The 294 by 56 feet (90 by 17 m) Voyager was built by Edison Chouest Offshore and is operated by Guice Offshore (GO), the former operator of SpaceX capsule recovery vessels MV Megan and MV Shannon. The ship acts as both the launch and recovery platform for the Spaceship Neptune gondola. In September 2024, the inaugural test launch of Excelsior was successfully performed from MS Voyager.
