= World View Enterprises =

Private American near-space exploration and technology company

World View Enterprises Inc.
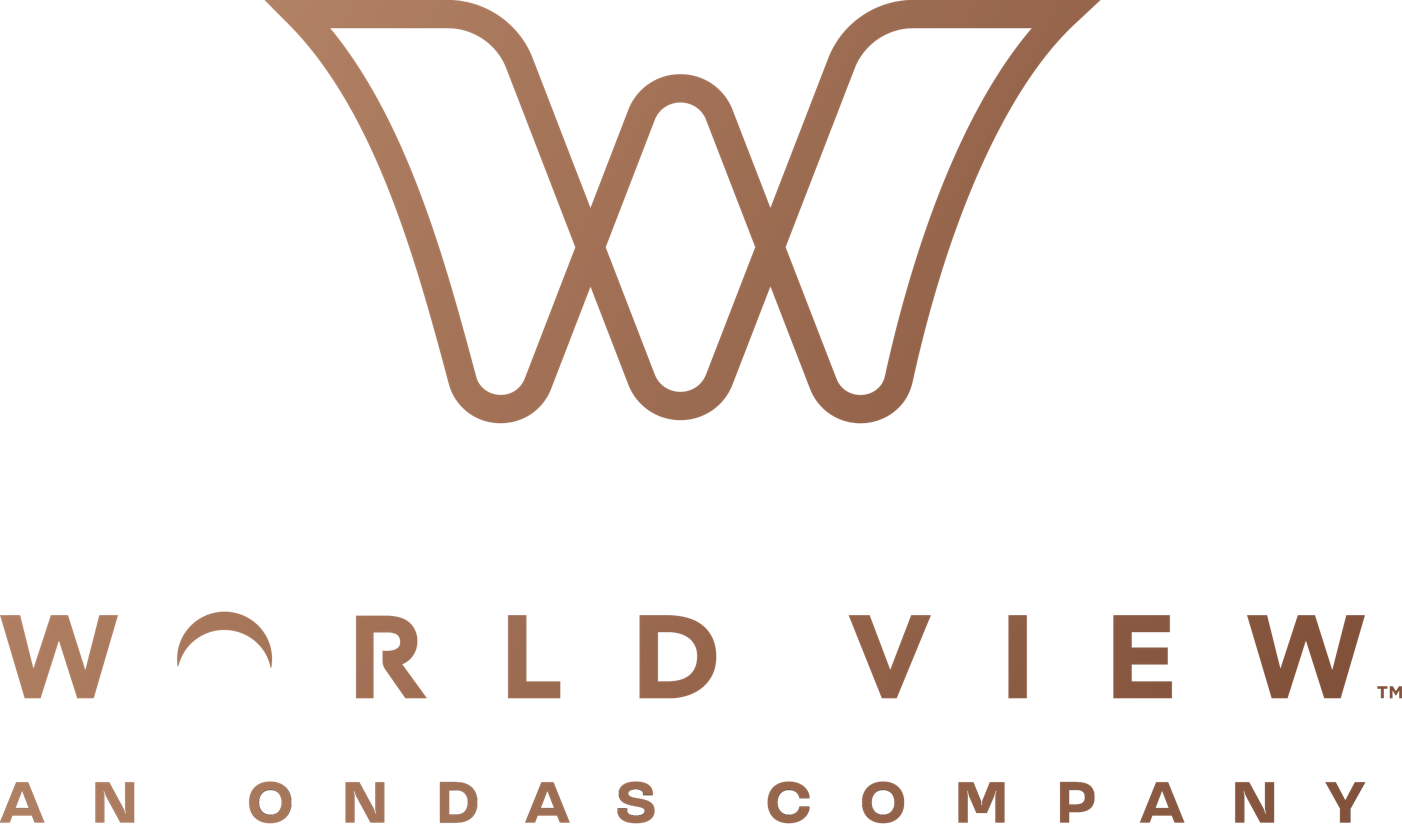

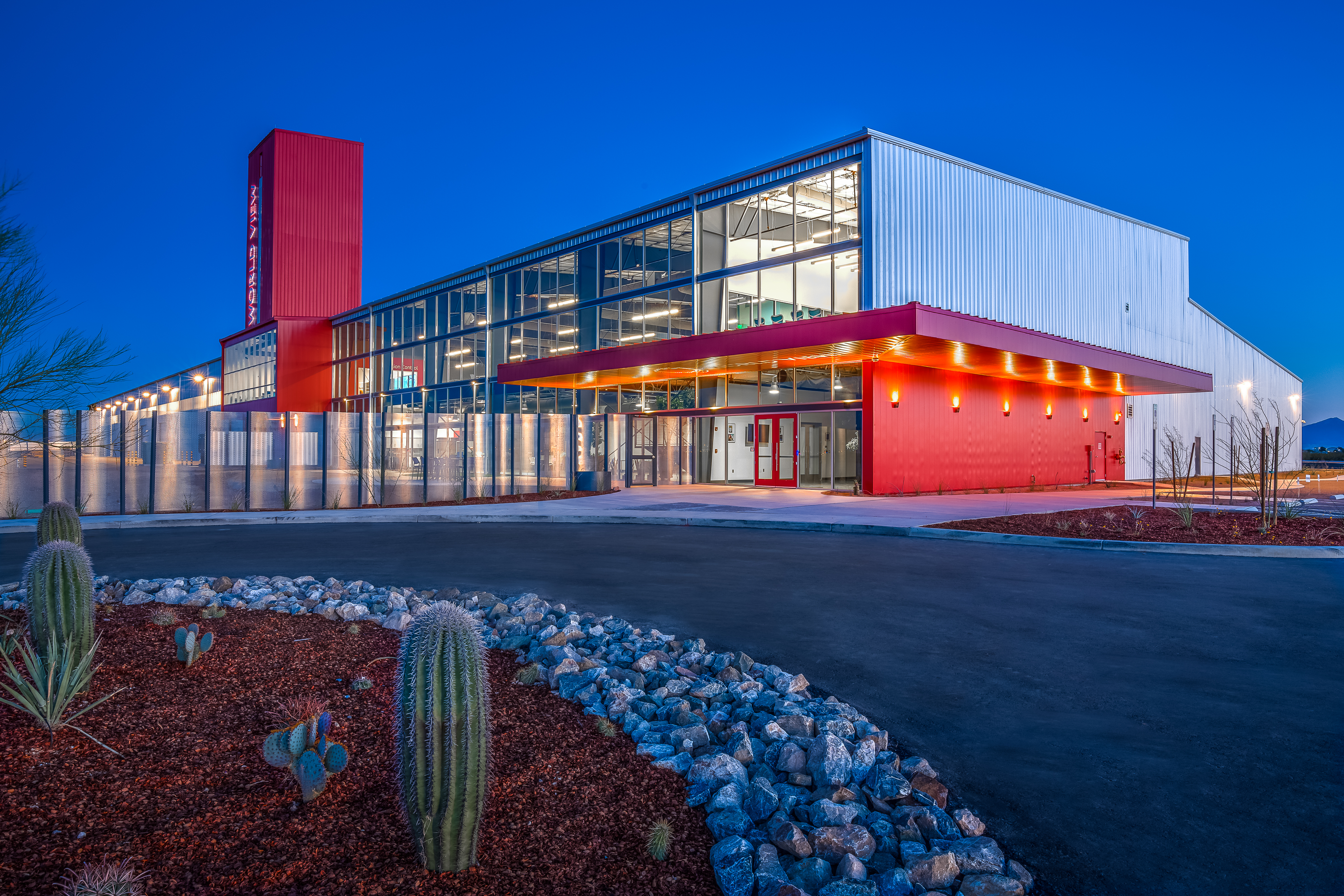
- Type: Public
- Traded as: Nasdaq: ONDS
- Industry: Aerospace
- Founded: August 2012
- Headquarters: Tucson, Arizona
- Key people: Ryan Hartman (President, CEO)
- Parent: Ondas, Inc.
- Website: worldview.space

World View Enterprises, Inc., doing business as World View, is an American near space exploration and technology company acquired by Ondas, Inc. in April 2026. The company is headquartered in Tucson, Arizona and was founded with the goal of increasing access to and the utilization of the stratosphere for scientific, commercial, economic, and military purposes.

World View was founded and incorporated in 2012 by a team of aerospace and life support veterans and designs, manufactures and operates stratospheric balloon flight technology and services for a variety of customers and applications, most notably space tourism and stratospheric observation services.

== Stratollite and Z-Class vehicle ==
The Stratollite is a remotely operated, navigable, uncrewed stratospheric flight vehicle designed and engineered to station-keep over customer-specified areas of interest for long periods of time (days, weeks, and months). The Stratollite uses proprietary altitude control technology to rise and lower in the stratosphere, harnessing the natural currents of varying stratospheric winds to provide point-to-point navigation and loitering. The Stratollite operates at altitudes up to 95,000 ft. (30 km) with a payload capacity of 50 kg (110 lb) and 250W of continuous power to payloads. The Stratollite is primarily used for applications including remote sensing, communications, and weather.

The Stratollite consists of a high-altitude balloon which lofts up a large solar panel and a payload gondola. The Stratollite also has a steerable parachute for soft return to ground after mission, enabling payload recovery. The main innovation of the Stratollite is its steerability enabling point-to-point navigation and persistent flight over selected area. The Stratollite relies on the natural winds in the atmosphere for its propulsion; it steerability is based on its ability to control its altitude, thus harnessing winds of different directions, enabling the Stratollite to move in the direction it wants to.

World view also offer traditional, uncontrolled high-altitude balloon flights (which just drift freely, without any control of direction of travel, in the winds of the high atmosphere) with their so-called Z-Class flight vehicle. The Z-Class vehicle has much larger payload capability and higher operating altitude compared to the Stratollite. The Z-Class flight vehicle also offers a possibility for payload recovery.

World View has conducted Z-Class flights for NASA's Flight Opportunities Program (FOP), for example on March 29, 2018 when two NASA radiation detection experiments, Automated Radiation Measurements for Aerospace Safety (ARMAS) and a chip-based radiation sensor were flown out of Spaceport Tucson.

== Explorer human spaceflight experience ==
The Explorer human spaceflight experience (so called by World View, even though the flight would not reach space by any standards) is under development with the goal of carrying private individuals to approximately 100,000 ft (30.48 km) above Earth inside a pressurized capsule lofted by a helium-filled high-altitude balloon. The flight vehicle will carry eight passengers and two crew on an approximately 6-8 hour flight (from liftoff to touchdown). Once the pilot nears the target landing zone, the capsule will deploy a patented parafoil system and separate from the balloon. The parafoil system is navigated to steer the capsule to a pre-determined landing zone. The flight experience is intended to give passengers a wide-angle and long-duration view of the curvature of the Earth against the blackness of space. The pressurized capsule is planned to include a restroom, minibar, and communications capabilities for communicating with family and friends below in real-time. In 2018, tickets were being offered for $75,000 with a $7,500 deposit.

As of December 2019, World View saw the first flights taking place "in few short years". However, a precise date for the first flight was not announced. Technology development and systems testing are on-going, and the company stated that the "most recent major test flight [had taken] place in June of 2014" when a 10% scale model was flown into stratosphere and successfully recovered, demonstrating the targeted flight profile.

In April 2020, the company delayed development plans of a robust "stratospheric racetrack" due to the COVID-19 pandemic, instead continuing to work with customers on scientific payloads and data collection.

On 3 May 2021, the following text was in the World View company's website: "Our full, flight services portfolio, including the very unique experience we call Explorer, will continue to be a part of the future planning within World View while we focus our near-term attention on our unmanned, stratospheric data and information services."

On 4 October 2021, World View announced that commercial flights will begin in 2024 out of Spaceport Grand Canyon. In total, seven spaceports (which, though called spaceports by the company, are only planned to support high-altitude ballooning) are planned to open between 2024-2027 across the world as part of the Seven Wonders of the World, Stratospheric Edition. Spaceports will be located at Amazonia in Brazil, Aurora Borealis in Norway, Pyramids of Giza in Egypt, Grand Canyon in the United States, Great Barrier Reef in Australia, Great Wall of China in Mongolia, and Serengeti in Kenya. Interested participants can place a $1000 refundable deposit to secure their place in line for a flight out of any of these seven spaceports, known as the Seven Wonders of the World: Stratospheric Edition. Explorer-class flights, which begin with Flight #21, cost $50,000 per seat. Participants will spend 5 days at the spaceport location experiencing, exploring and learning about the local area with local guides and then float up to see these world wonders from 100,000 feet.

== Spaceport Tucson ==
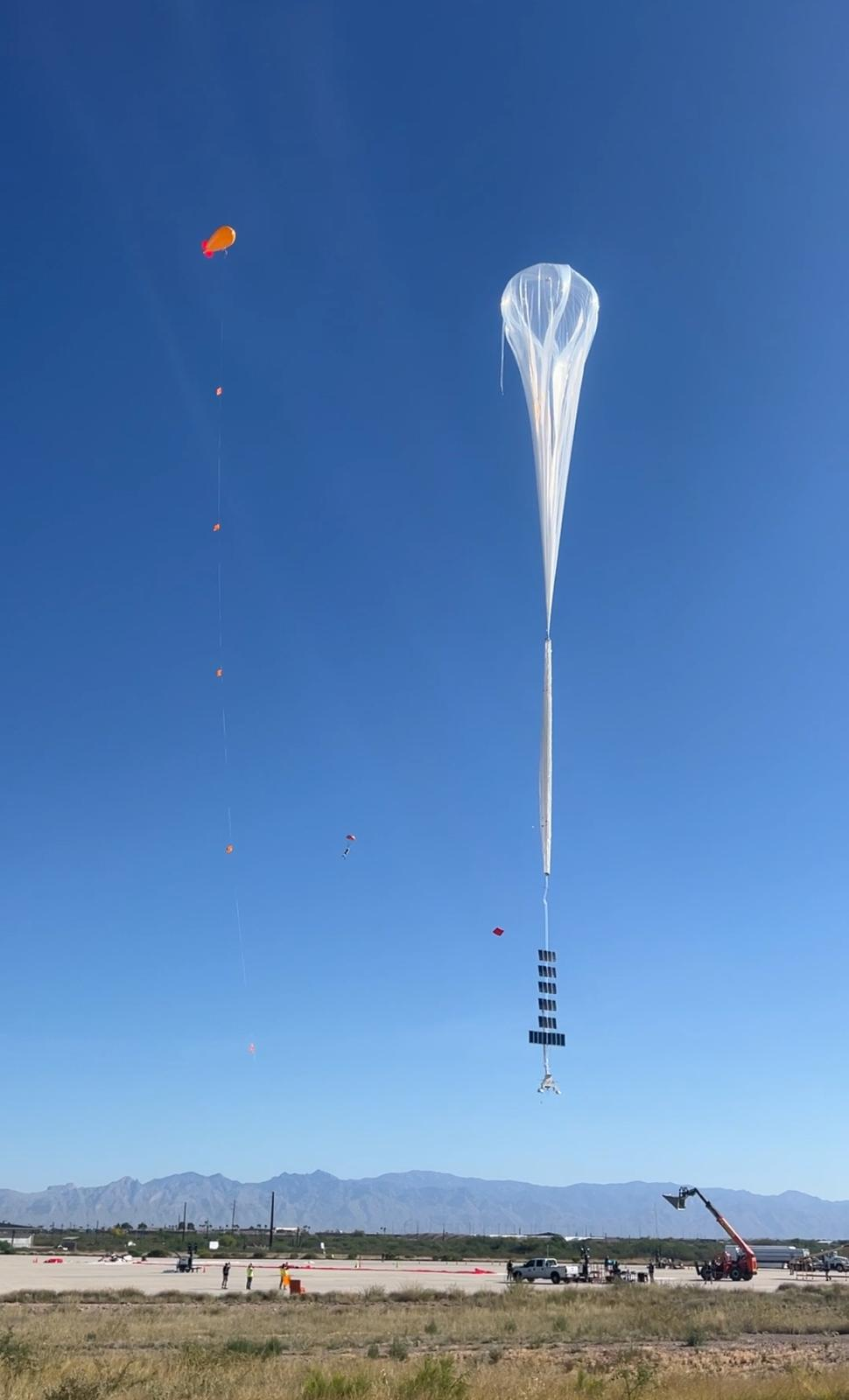
Worldview launch from Spaceport Tucson

World View (usually; a stratospheric balloon can be launched basically anywhere on Earth) launches its stratospheric balloons from a facility called Spaceport Tucson, a purpose-built facility for stratospheric ballooning. The spaceport and the headquarters of World View are located in Tucson, Arizona. The spaceport is owned by Pima County (where the spaceport is located) and operated by World View. World View is the anchor tenant of the spaceport with a 20-year lease contract. The spaceport in practice consists of a circular, 200-meter-diameter concrete launch pad for stratospheric balloons, and the World View facility located at the edge of said launch pad. Pima County used $15 million to build Spaceport Tucson. County officials approved construction on 19 January 2016. The first launch for the spaceport took place 30 September 2017.

Spaceport Tucson is planned as a special-purpose, high-altitude ballooning facility, even if it is named a spaceport.

== History ==
World View incorporated on August 30, 2012.

During a test flight in June 2014 World View successfully deployed and remotely navigated a parafoil back down to Earth from an altitude of 50,000 feet (15 km).

An October 2015 test flight brought a 10-percent scale passenger capsule to over 100,000 feet (30 km) altitude; a full-scale test is anticipated to follow.

A September 2016 flight carried a small, uncrewed, scientific payload to an altitude of over 100,000 feet (30 km) on behalf of the Southwest Research Institute through NASA's Flight Opportunities Program.

By January 2016, World View was planning to operate commercial flights from Spaceport Tucson beginning in 2017.

In April 2016, World View announced that, following $7 million in "Series A" financing, it had raised an additional $15 million in "Series B" funding.

In June 2017, World View completed a 17-hour flight featuring a KFC product; though a balloon leak cut it short from the intended four-day duration, it was World View's first flight in which a solar array was "properly pointing at the sun".

In July 2017, World View completed a 27-hour flight.

In October 2017, World View completed a first flight from Tucson, Arizona, staying aloft for five days: the longest duration of any World View flight to date.

On December 19, 2017, a hydrogen balloon exploded on site causing tremors in the Tucson area that shook for over half a mile and caused $200,000 in damage to a nearby building. According to an Independent Incident Review Team report, the explosion occurred when deflating the hydrogen balloon: interaction between the plastic balloon shell and/or inflation tube, built up electrostatic charge which then discharged and caused the hydrogen gas, which mixed with atmospheric oxygen, to ignite. Jane Poynter (then CEO) later said about the accident: "we don't use hydrogen with our Stratollites, this was different from our core business. And we now know exactly how it occurred, why, and how to stop it from ever happening again."

In March, 2018, World View announced that it had raised an additional $26.5 million in "Series C" funding.

In August 2018, Matteo Genna joined World View as senior vice president.

In February 2019, Ryan Hartman was named World View CEO.

On June 5, 2019, a 16-day Stratollite Mission Milestone was achieved.

On October 1, 2019, a 32-day Stratollite Mission Milestone was achieved.

On 13 April 2020, Ryan Hartman said in an interview that World View would delay market-entry plans for their products (mainly the Stratollite) and furlough staff because of the COVID-19 pandemic.

On 4 October 2021, World View announced their commercial flights will begin in 2024 out of Spaceport Grand Canyon. Explorer-class flights, which begin with Flight #21, cost $50,000 per seat.

In February 2022, Dale Hipsh joined World View as president of tourism and exploration.

In October 2022, the Arizona Court of Appeals found a contract provision to sell $14 million of Pima County land to World View for $10 unconstitutional.

On 13 January 2023, World View announced that it had agreed to go public through a SPAC merger later that year. The company would be listed at New York Stock Exchange. The merger would value the company at $350 million. At the time of the announcement, the company had conducted more than 120 stratospheric flights, working with a variety of companies and government agencies.

On 1 April 2026, Ondas, Inc. announced that it had completed its acquisition of World View. It was announced that World View would continue to operate as a wholly owned subsidiary of Ondas, Inc.

== Key people ==
World View was founded and incorporated in 2012 by a team of aerospace and life support veterans, including Biosphere 2 crew-members Jane Poynter and Taber MacCallum, Alan Stern, and former NASA astronaut Mark Kelly. Poynter and MacCallum later left World View and founded their own near-space-balloon-tourism company Space Perspective in 2019.

Ryan M Hartman, president and CEO, joined World View in February 2019. Prior to World View, Hartman served as president and chief executive officer of Insitu (acquired by Boeing), a pioneer in the design, development and manufacturing of unmanned aircraft.

Matteo Genna, SVP remote sensing, joined World View in August 2018. Prior to World View, Matteo served as chief technology officer of Space Systems Loral (SSL), a leading provider of commercial satellites. Genna departed World View May 2023.

Dale Hipsh, president of tourism and exploration, joined World View in February 2022. Dale has spent the last 35 years in the hospitality industry and crafting bespoke guest experiences across the globe for renowned hospitality brands as Hard Rock Hotels and The Ritz Carlton. Hipsh departed World View January 2023.

Alan Stern, chief scientist, was appointed NASA's associate administrator for the Science Mission Directorate, essentially NASA's top-ranking official for science, in April 2007. In this position Stern directed a US$4.4 billion organization with 93 flight missions and a program of over 3,000 research grants. He is also the principal investigator of the New Horizons mission to Pluto and the chief scientist at Moon Express.

== See also ==
- Commercial Spaceflight Federation
- Inspiration Mars
- Zero 2 Infinity, another near-space-balloon-tourism company
- Deimos-One, another near-space-balloon-tourism company
