= Jane Poynter =

American aerospace executive, author and speaker

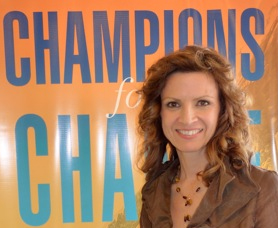
Jane Poynter

Jane Poynter is an American aerospace executive, author and speaker. She is founder, co-CEO and CXO of Space Perspective, a luxury space travel company. She was co-founder and former CEO of World View Enterprises, a private near-space exploration and technology company headquartered in Tucson, Arizona. Poynter was also a founding member of the Biosphere 2 design team and a crew member from the original two-year mission inside the materially closed ecological system.

Prior to World View, Poynter served as co-founder, Chairwoman and President of Paragon Space Development Corporation, a designer and manufacturer of hazardous environment life support equipment.

== Business ventures ==
=== Space Perspective ===
Space Perspective is a high-altitude flight tourism company, founded and incorporated in 2019 by Poynter and Taber MacCallum, with plans to launch its nine-person Spaceship Neptune crewed balloon from NASA Kennedy Space Center.

On June 18, 2020, Space Perspective announced plans to balloon passengers to nearly 100,000 feet (30,000 m; 30 km) above the Earth. The tickets are US$125,000 per seat.

On 2 December 2020, Space Perspective closed its seed funding round. US$7 million of funding had been gathered. The company planned the first uncrewed test flight in the first half of 2021 and crewed operational flights by end of 2024. By October 2024, Richard Branson had invested and it was announced he would co-pilot the first crewed launch in 2025.

=== World View Enterprises ===
World View Enterprises, doing business as World View, is a private American near-space exploration and technology company headquartered in Tucson, Arizona, founded with the goal of increasing access to and the utilization of the stratosphere for scientific, commercial, and economic purposes.

World View was founded and incorporated in 2012 by a team of aerospace and life support veterans, including Biosphere 2 crew-members Poynter and Taber MacCallum, Alan Stern (the principal investigator of the New Horizons mission to Pluto), and former NASA astronaut Mark Kelly. The company designs, manufactures and operates stratospheric flight technology for a variety of customers and applications.

==== The Stratollite ====
The Stratollite is a remotely operated, navigable, un-crewed stratospheric flight vehicle designed and engineered to station-keep over customer-specified areas of interest for long periods of time (days, weeks, and months). The Stratollite uses proprietary altitude control technology to rise and lower in the stratosphere, harnessing the natural currents of varying stratospheric winds to provide point-to-point navigation and loitering. The Stratollite operates at altitudes up to 95,000 ft. (30 km) with a payload capacity of 50 kg and 250W of continuous power to payloads. The Stratollite is primarily used for applications including remote sensing, communications, and weather.

=== Paragon Space Development Corporation ===
Poynter was a founder of Paragon Space Development Corporation, which develops technologies for extreme environments (like outer space and under water). While inside Biosphere 2, she co-founded the firm with fellow biospherian, Taber MacCallum, whom she later married, Grant Anderson, Paragon's President and CEO and several other aerospace engineers. In 2009 the National Association for Female Executives awarded Poynter its Entrepreneur of the Year award.

=== Inspiration Mars ===
Poynter was a developer of the crew and life-support systems for the Inspiration Mars free-return mission to Mars planned for launch in January 2018. The two person spaceflight mission was originally to be a private, nonprofit venture of 501 days duration which will allow a small human-carrying spacecraft to use the smallest possible amount of fuel to get it to Mars and back to Earth. However, this plan proved unworkable without significant funding and assistance from NASA.

The life support system is critical:

"If anything goes wrong, the spacecraft should make its own way back to Earth — but with no possibility of any short-cuts home."

== Former ventures ==
=== Biosphere 2 ===
Poynter was one of eight people who agreed to live in a sealed artificial world for two years from September 1991 to September 1993. Just twelve days into the mission, she was injured in a rice-threshing machine, and had to leave the Biosphere for medical treatment. She was out for less than seven hours. The project came under media criticism after it was revealed that some spare parts were placed in the airlock with her when she went back in.

Poynter reported that low morale and psychological problems plagued the two-year mission. The eight crew members eventually split into two factions of four who hated each other.

== Other work ==
Poynter also worked with the World Bank on projects to mitigate global climate change and grow crops in drought-stricken Africa and Central America. She is president of Blue Marble Institute, a 501(c)(3) non profit dedicated to leadership in science, sustainability and exploration. She serves on the City of Tucson's Climate Change Committee. Her second book, Champions for Change: Athletes Making A World of Difference is now a middle school program.

Poynter has been an invited speaker at events hosted by groups such as the United Nations Environment Programme, the US Environmental Protection Agency, TEDx, National Space Symposium, NASA, MIT, and Microsoft.

== Bibliography ==
- Poynter, Jane (2006). The Human Experiment: Two Years and Twenty Minutes Inside Biosphere 2. Basic Books. ISBN 978-1-56025-775-2.
- Poynter, Jane (2009). Champions for Change: Athletes Making a World of Difference. Global Sports Alliance USA. ISBN 978-0-615-30479-3.
