= Deimos-One =

American spaceflight technology development company

- Company type: Private
- Industry: Aerospace
- Headquarters: 5940 S Rainbow Blvd, Las Vegas, Nevada, United States
- Key people: Jamin Thompson, CEO
- Website: www.deimosone.com
- Footnotes / references Nevada Secretary of State,

Deimos-One is an American spaceflight technology development company working on an AI powered, autonomous UAV rocket system to move payloads to space. As of January 2021, the company has completed a successful prototype test flight, reaching an altitude of 30 km (19 mi).

== History ==
Deimos-One was founded in 2020 by Jamin Thompson in Las Vegas, Nevada. The company's current headquarters are in Summerlin, Nevada. In 2021, Deimos-One continued development of its 150,000 square-foot corporate headquarters in southern Nevada and test flight facility.

== Technology ==
Deimos-One is developing a stratospheric UAV powered space launch system that intends to reduce dependency on traditional chemical rockets, with the goal of lowering the cost of access to space while increasing the frequency of launch. The technology uses a first-stage balloon to lift the launch vehicle to a pre-programmed altitude. The rocket ignites its engines once the launch craft reaches a 100,000 foot (30 km) altitude and then inserts the payload into orbit. The launcher aims to be capable of firing rockets from high altitudes and autonomously returning to the ground after firing for collection of mission assets and reuse. If successful, the launch concept is projected to both reduce cost and increase mission efficiency, with the price of a single space launch reduced nearly 20 times to a cost of under US$500,000.

== Products ==
It currently focuses on technologies in the following three focus areas:

- Vulcan: an autonomous, rockoon based, AI powered launcher designed to carry payloads such as small, micro, and nanosatellites to orbit.
- Heaven: a zero-emission spacecraft designed to carry humans and cargo to and from Earth orbit for the purposes of space tourism and scientific research.
- Robotics and AI: multiple technologies designed for environmental purification, smarter workplaces, and defense purposes.

Vulcan is a multi-stage, stratospheric launch vehicle currently in development, intended to compete in the small satellite launch market. Based on the rockoon concept, the vehicle's primary function will be to fire rockets from high altitudes and autonomously return to the ground after firing for collection of mission assets and reuse. The two-stage craft consists of a stratospheric balloon and a rocket capable UAV. A first-stage balloon system which will carry the launch vehicle to a designated altitude of roughly 100,000 feet (30,000 meters; 19 miles) altitude above the Earth's surface. Once there, the launch vehicle aligns itself and the rocket system inserts the payload into orbit. The design is intended to be multi-mission capable for civil, commercial, and military objectives such as spacecraft component testing, celestial observation, recon, communications, data analysis, and scientific research missions. As of December 2025, their website has no mention of a orbital rockoon system.

Heaven is a zero-emission spacecraft in development, designed to carry humans and cargo to and from Earth orbit. The craft, which consists of a high-performance, balloon-borne, pressurized space capsule, would perform crewed flights to near space and autonomously return to Earth. The technology would carry up to 7 passengers and one pilot (8 total crew) to an altitude as high as 40 km (25 mi; 130,000 ft) without the need of a spacesuit. The flight involves a two-hour ascent phase and a two-hour cruise altitude, before returning to Earth using a custom guidance system and steerable parachute.

== See also ==
- Launch service provider
- Zero 2 Infinity, a similar rockoon-technology company
- Outline of space technology
- Reusable launch system
- Spaceplane
- SpaceX
- World View Enterprises, another near-space-balloon-tourism company
