= Commercial Spaceflight Federation =

Private spaceflight industry group

Commercial Space Federation
- Founded: 2005
- Type: Non-profit Trade Association
- Location: Washington D.C.
- Region served: United States
- Members: 85+
- Key people: Dave Cavossa (President)
- Website: commercialspace.org

The Commercial Space Federation is the leading trade association representing the commercial space industry in Washington, D.C. They serve as the industry's voice to the Executive and Legislative Branches of government, advocating for policies that support growth and innovation, and engaging with the media to promote the value of commercial space. CSF member companies come from all the key aspects of the commercial industrial base to include launch and reentry providers, commercial LEO services, remote sensing and analytics, satellite service providers, spaceports and infrastructure, commercial lunar and space exploration, space situational awareness, and space solar power.

Issues that the Commercial Space Federation works on include, but are not limited to, airspace issues, FAA regulations and permits, industry safety standards, public outreach, and public advocacy for the commercial space sector.

== History ==
In 2005, Peter Diamandis and John Gedmark from the X Prize Foundation convened a group of leaders in the emerging personal spaceflight industry, held at SpaceX's headquarters in El Segundo, California. Attendees at the meeting included SpaceX CEO Elon Musk, Virgin Galactic's Alex Tai, aviation pioneer Burt Rutan, businessman Robert Bigelow, and entrepreneur John Carmack. The goal of what was then called the Personal Spaceflight Federation was to "design and uphold the standards and processes necessary to ensure public safety and promote growth of the personal spaceflight industry."

On August 22, 2006, the PSF laid out their priorities as:

- Member Coordination
- Government Interface
  - Both with Congress and other federal agencies in order "to develop a legal and regulatory environment supportive of the growth of the human spaceflight industry."
- Safety in spaceport operations, crew and passenger training, and vehicle manufacture, operations, and maintenance
  - Safety was highlighted as the most important concern for the PSF because safety was the common link between all the member companies
- Insurance
- Public Relations

On June 15, 2008, the Personal Spaceflight Federation announced a new website and a new name—the Commercial Spaceflight Federation—to emphasize "the diverse business activities of the commercial human spaceflight industry." The areas the CSF now represented include:

- Cargo and crew to the International Space Station
- Flight of private individuals (space tourism)
- Science Research Missions
- Technology Research and Development
- Astronaut training
- Education and Outreach Activities
- National Security Applications

On August 10, 2009, CSF announced the creation of the Suborbital Applications Research Group (SARG). On February 18, 2010, the CSF announced a new research and education affiliates program.

United Launch Alliance joined in 2010, followed by Boeing's membership in 2013, but both left by 2014. The X Prize Foundation left by around 2016.

CSF has hosted the CST Commercial Space Transportation Conference in partnership with the FAA since 2017.

== Lobbying efforts ==
- The Commercial Spaceflight Federation lobbied for passage of the 2015 Commercial Space Bill.
- Former Commercial Spaceflight Federation President Eric Stallmer testified before the Senate Subcommittee on Science, Space, and Competitiveness on February 24, 2015
- Former CSF President Eric Stallmer testified alongside Elliot Pullham, CEO of the Space Foundation at a House Science, Space and Technology hearing on April 19, 2016
- CSF opposed the sale of excess ICBMs for use in space launch.
- Eric Stallmer testified for the House's Science, Space, and Technology Subcommittee in a hearing titled "The ISS After 2024: Options and Impacts." on March 22, 2017
- The Commercial Spaceflight Federation hosted a cocktail party for members of the National Space Council, including Vice President Pence, in February 2018.
- A week before the 50th anniversary of Apollo 11, Eric Stallmer testified before the Senate Commerce, Science, and Transportation Committee with Apollo 11 & 13 flight director Gene Kranz, former NASA engineer and author of Rocket Boys, Homer Hickam, former NASA mathematician Christine Darden, and CEO of the Coalition for Deep Space Exploration Mary Lynne Dittmar on July 9, 2019
- Eric Stallmer testified before the House Science, Space, and Technology Subcommittee in a hearing on NASA's ISS plans on July 10, 2019
- Karina Drees testified before the Senate Commerce, Science, and Transportation Committee titled "Space Situational Awareness, Space Traffic Management, and Orbital Debris: Examining Solutions for Emerging Threats" on July 22, 2021.
- Karina Drees testified before the House Science, Space, and Technology Subcommittee in a hearing titled "Continuing U.S. Leadership in Commercial Space at Home and Abroad" on July 13, 2023.

== Committees and Working Groups ==
The Commercial Spaceflight Federation has two organizing committees as well as several working groups composed of their members and staff that are working to address the most pressing issues facing the industry. Participation in these committees is open to Executive and Associate members.

=== Legislative ===
The Legislative Committee works to secure funding for civil space activities, NASA, the Office of Space Commerce, and FAA's Office of Commercial Space Transportation (AST). Additionally, it seeks to work with congressional offices and committees to implement programmatic and language requests that establish and benefit programs that utilize commercial industry.

=== Regulatory ===
CSF's Regulatory Committee collaborates to prepare information for and present a united position to regulators across the USG, ensuring that regulation does not needlessly hinder the advancement of the commercial space industry. To this end, the Regulatory Committee ensures that commercial perspectives are included in the regulation and standards development process to ensure the safety of spaceflight participants and provide the FAA and FCC with means of compliance.

The Committee also works with industry experts from a variety of government agencies (including The Departments of State and Commerce) to promote modernization of Export Control policy and procedures in regards to the commercial space industry. The committee aims to assist American companies to remain competitive leaders in the global market and to advance innovation and technology overall. The committee also serves as a point of reference for adherence to current legislation and policy.

=== Spaceports ===
The Commercial Spaceflight Federation's Spaceports Working Group focuses on a wide variety of issues facing the spaceport community including environmental, infrastructure, and regulatory topics, as well as seeking to encourage and fund programs to support spaceports.

== Membership ==
CSF members are responsible for the creation of thousands of high-tech jobs. Members include over 85 industry organizations involved in commercial spaceflight and private spaceflight, often referred to as new space.

There are four tiers of CSF membership, with each having different requirements and perks. The highest tier is Executive Membership, which is generally reserved for commercial spaceflight developers, operators, and spaceports. Below Executive members are Associate Members, which is composed of suppliers supporting commercial spaceflight, with recent members including suppliers of mission support services and suppliers of training, medical and life-support products and services. The third tier of membership is called Research and Education Affiliates (REM for short), and this tier is occupied by Universities, educational and student nonprofits, and other research and education institutions. The fourth tier of CSF membership is the Patrons Program. This tier is distinct from the rest in the sense that it is composed of individuals rather than corporate entities.

=== Executive Members ===
Executive Membership is the highest level of membership offered at the Commercial Spaceflight Federation. At this level, members have an exclusive seat on the CSF Board of Directors.

==== Current List of Executive Members ====
(Updated November 30, 2024):

- Arizona State University
- Axiom Space
- Blue Origin
- Cecil Field Spaceport (Jacksonville)
- ISS National Laboratory
- Maxar Technologies
- Midland International Air & Space Port
- Planet
- Redwire
- Relativity Space
- Rocket Lab
- Sierra Space
- Southwest Research Institute
- Space Florida
- Stoke Space
- SpaceX
- Virgin Galactic
- Voyager Space Holdings
- World View Enterprises

=== Associate Members ===
The second highest tier, Associate members are invited to participate on CSF committees and working groups.

==== Current List of Associate Members ====
(Updated November 30, 2024):

- Advanced Space
- Aerostar
- Aetherflux
- Alaska Aerospace Corporation
- Amazon (Kuiper Systems)
- Astranis Space Technologies
- Arctos
- AST Space Mobile
- Barrios Technology
- Cesium Astro
- Colorado Air and Space Port
- COMSPOC
- Firefly Aerospace
- Gravitics
- HawkEye 360
- Houston Airport System
- Interlune
- ispace Inc.
- Johns Hopkins University Applied Physics Laboratory
- LeoLabs
- Mead and Hunt
- RS&H
- Space Tango
- Spaceport America
- Titusville-Cocoa Airport Authority
- Varda Space Industries
- Vast

=== Research and Education Affiliates ===
The Research and Education Affiliates is primarily for "Researchers, engineers, and educators."

==== Current list of research and education affiliates ====
(Updated November 30, 2024):

- American Society for Gravitational and Space Research
- Association of Spaceflight Professionals
- Baylor College of Medicine
- Burrell College of Osteopathic Medicine
- Embry-Riddle Aeronautical University
- Florida Institute of Technology
- Florida State University
- The Museum of Flight
- High Speed Flight
- National Institute for Aviation Research
- New Mexico Institute of Mining and Technology
- New Mexico State University
- Purdue University
- Silicon Valley Space Center
- Sovaris Aerospace, LLC
- Stanford Aeronautics & Astronautics
- STARS at Carnegie Mellon
- University of Arizona
- University of Central Florida
- University of Florida
- University of North Dakota
- University of Texas Medical Branch

=== Patrons Program ===
The Patron Program is unique in that it allows for individual membership, unlike other membership categories, which are reserved for corporations, and organizations.

== Suborbital Applications Researchers Group ==
The Suborbital Applications Researchers Group (SARG) was created on August 10, 2009, to "increase awareness of commercial suborbital vehicles in the science and R&D communities, to work with policymakers to ensure that payloads can have easy access to these vehicles, and to further develop ideas for the uses of these vehicles for science, engineering, and education missions."

Members of SARG (Updated August 7, 2019)
Member	Affiliation
Michael Banish	University of Alabama in Huntsville
Steven Collicott	Purdue University
Marsh Cuttino	Orbital Medicine
Adrienne Dove	University of Central Florida
Steve Heck	The Arete STEM Project and Foundation
Anna-Lisa Paul	University of Florida
Bobby M. Russell	Quest for Stars, Global STEM Outreach
Mark Shelhamer	Johns Hopkins University
H. Todd Smith	JHU Applied Physics Laboratory
Constantine Tsang	Southwest Research Institute
Charlie Walker	Independent Consultant & Speaker

== See also ==
- NewSpace
