= Near space =

Region of Earth's atmosphere

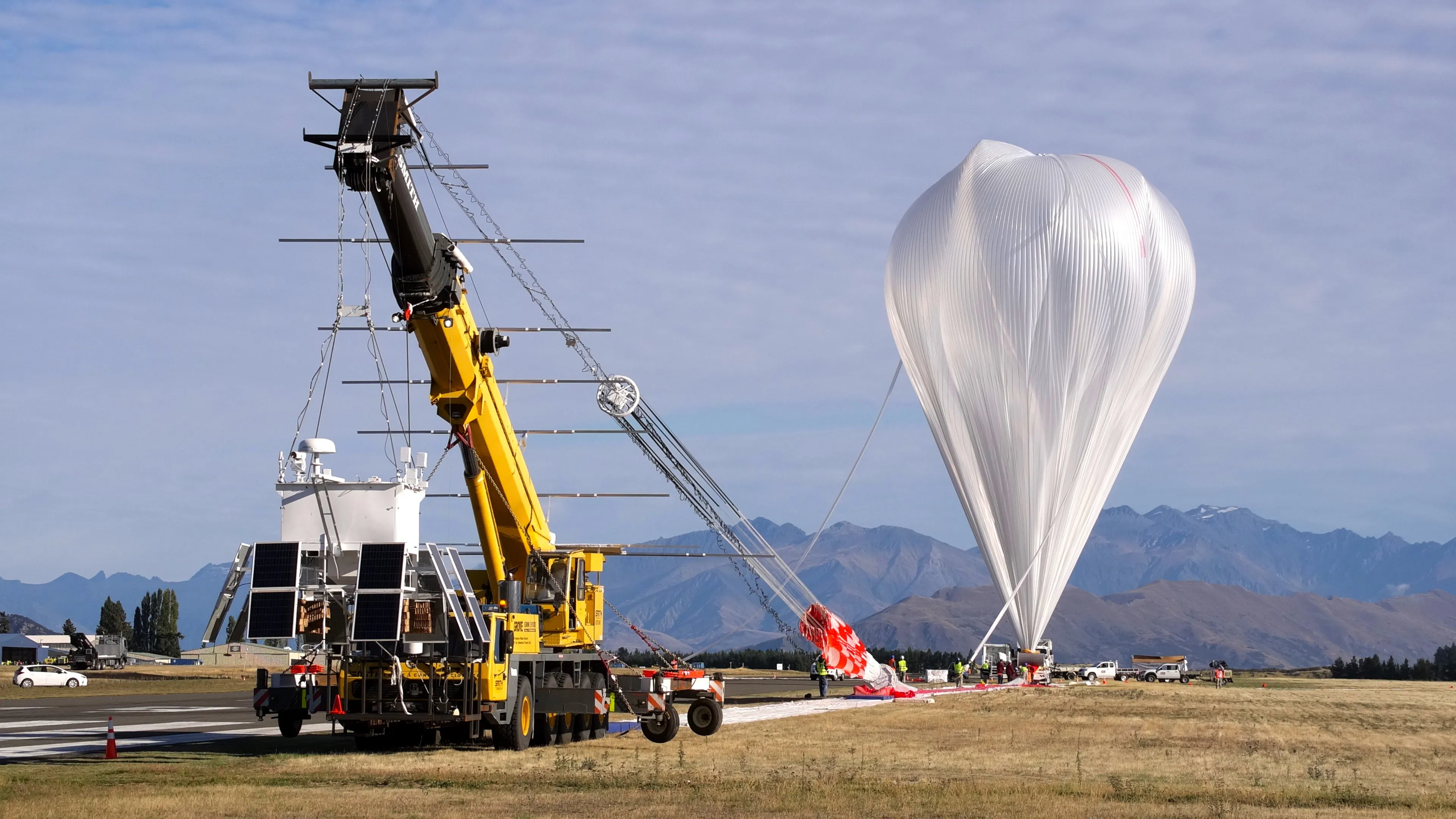
NASA superpressure balloon preparing for a mission to near space in 2015

Near space is the upper region of the Earth's atmosphere between airspace and outer space. It is sometimes referred to as the "edge of space". There is no legal definition for this extent, but typically this is the altitude range from 20 to 100 km (12 to 62 mi).

== Range ==
The lower limit of this region is set by the flight envelope of normal aircraft. For safety reasons, commercial aircraft are normally limited to altitudes of 12 km (7.5 mi), and air navigation services only extend to 18 to 20 km (11 to 12 mi). The upper limit of the near space range is the Kármán line at 100 km (62 mi), where astrodynamics must take over from aerodynamics in order to achieve flight. This range includes the stratosphere, mesosphere and lower thermosphere layers of the Earth's atmosphere.

Larger ranges for near space are used by some authors, such as 18 to 160 km (11 to 99 mi). These extend from the Armstrong limit to the altitudes where orbital flight in very low Earth orbits becomes practical. Spacecraft have entered into a highly elliptical orbit with a perigee as low as 80 to 90 km (50 to 56 mi), surviving for multiple orbits. At an altitude of 120 km (75 mi), descending spacecraft begin atmospheric entry as atmospheric drag becomes noticeable. For spaceplanes such as NASA's Space Shuttle, this begins the process of switching from steering with thrusters to maneuvering with aerodynamic control surfaces.

== Applications ==
Craft that fly in near space include high-altitude balloons, non-rigid airships, rockoons, sounding rockets, and the Lockheed U-2 aircraft. It is of growing interest for the use of various high-altitude platform stations. This region can provide long-term sensing of a duration and quality that is unavailable via satellites. The potential uses for unmanned near–space vehicles include persistent ground surveillance and communications (including relays), both for military and commercial uses. Near-space is a level flight operating region for hypersonic vehicles.

Although there are no clouds or storms in near space, wind is still a significant factor that can require station-keeping of a long-term vehicle. This region is located below the ionosphere, which can impact electrical signals that pass through it. The ionosphere can significantly degrade microwave signals from orbiting satellites, a disadvantage that near-earth vehicles lack.

Near space has been used for scientific ballooning for over two centuries, for applications such as submillimetre astronomy. High-altitude balloons are flown by students and by amateur groups, for both scientific and educational purposes. One example are so-called PongSats. Near space is also a potential market for tourism balloon flights.

== Natural phenomena ==
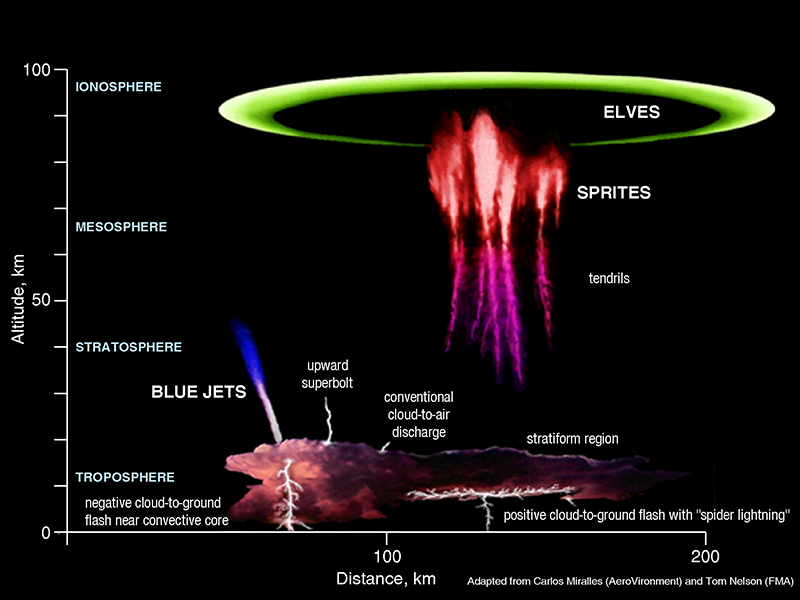
Upper atmospheric lightning

The stratosphere is a layer of the atmosphere that extends from below near space up to an altitude of 50 km (31 mi), although this can vary with latitude and seasons. The air here is very dry, but icy nacreous clouds can appear near the poles in the lower stratosphere during the winter. Temperature rises with increasing altitude and thus there is very little vertical convection, allowing compounds such as chlorofluorocarbons to remain in the stratosphere for a long duration. Ozone is relatively abundant in this layer, forming an ozone layer that absorbs ultraviolet radiation.

Above the stratosphere is the mesosphere, which ranges up to 85 km (53 mi) in altitude. Near the base of this region, the temperature is about −15 °C (5 °F), and it declines with increasing height. The air pressure is sufficiently dense to decelerate meteors, causing them to burn up. During the summer months at high latitudes, noctilucent clouds form from ice crystals at these altitudes. The ionosphere is a layer of ionized atoms and molecules that spans altitudes of 80 to 600 km (50 to 373 mi). These ions can reflect and modify radio waves passing through the upper atmosphere.

Airglow is a faint energy emission of solar radiation from atmospheric components in the upper part of Earth's atmosphere, starting at around 80 km (50 mi) in altitude. Molecules including NO, OH, and O_{2} undergo excitation, dissociation, recombination, and ionization from solar energy, causing the release of radiation. Aurora is an emission caused by interaction between the Earth's magnetic field and particles carried by the solar wind. These interact with molecular nitrogen and oxygen at altitudes from 90 to 130 km (56 to 81 mi), producing the auroral light. Other sources of energy in the atmosphere include galactic cosmic rays, zodiacal light, moonlight, and lightning discharge.

Atmospheric tides are large-scale oscillations created by cycles of solar radiation absorption. These propagate from the lower atmosphere up into the thermosphere, transporting energy and momentum. They couple together the different atmospheric layers through their dynamic behavior and interactions. Temperature variations created by atmospheric tides can control the appearance of ice particles in the mesosphere. Smaller scale oscillations in the atmosphere are caused by lunar tides.

== See also ==
- Effects of high altitude on humans
- Flight altitude record
- Sub-orbital spaceflight
- Upper atmosphere
