= Rockoon =

Sounding rocket carried by balloon to the upper atmosphere

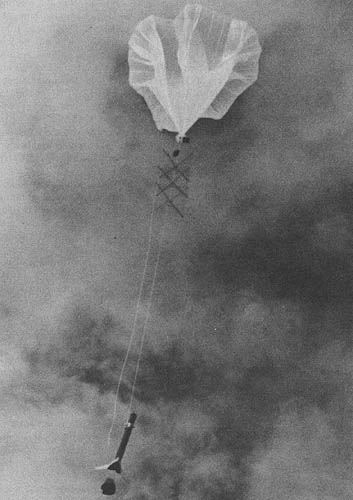
A Deacon rockoon just after shipboard launch.

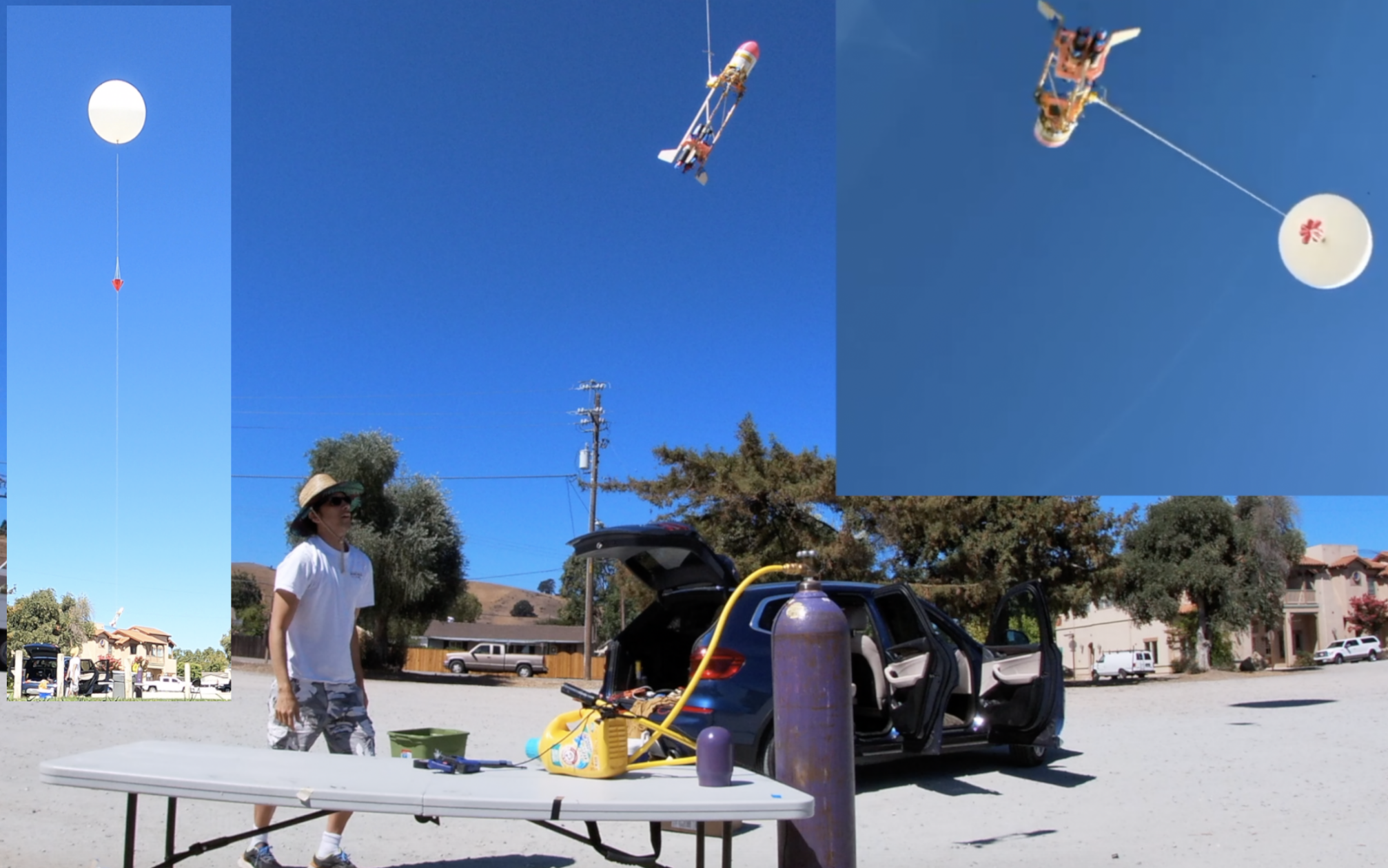
A rockoon at liftoff, August 2022.

A rockoon (from rocket and balloon) is a sounding rocket that, rather than being lit immediately while still on the ground, is first carried into the upper atmosphere by a gas-filled balloon, then separated from the balloon and ignited. This allows the rocket to achieve a higher altitude, as the rocket does not have to move under power through the lower and thicker layers of the atmosphere. A 2016 study by Acta Astronautica concluded that low-mass and high-altitude launches give the best results.

The original concept was developed by Cmdr. Lee Lewis, Cmdr. G. Halvorson, S. F. Singer, and James A. Van Allen during the Aerobee rocket firing cruise of the U.S.S. Norton Sound on March 1, 1949.

A serious disadvantage is that unpiloted balloons cannot be steered and consequently, the location from which the rocket is launched can be uncertain. Therefore, a large area for the fall of the rocket is required for safety reasons. The rockoons that Robert Ellis worked with cost around a tenth of the cost of rockets.

== Early atmospheric research ==
Time magazine reported in 1959: "Van Allen's 'Rockoons' could not be fired in Iowa for fear that the spent rockets would strike an Iowan or his house." Van Allen convinced the U.S. Coast Guard to let him fire his rockoons from the icebreaker Eastwind that was bound for Greenland. "The first balloon rose properly to 70,000 ft. [21,000 m], but the rocket hanging under it did not fire. The second Rockoon behaved in the same maddening way. On the theory that extreme cold at high altitude might have stopped the clockwork supposed to ignite the rockets, Van Allen heated cans of orange juice, snuggled them into the third Rockoon's gondola, and wrapped the whole business in insulation. The rocket fired."

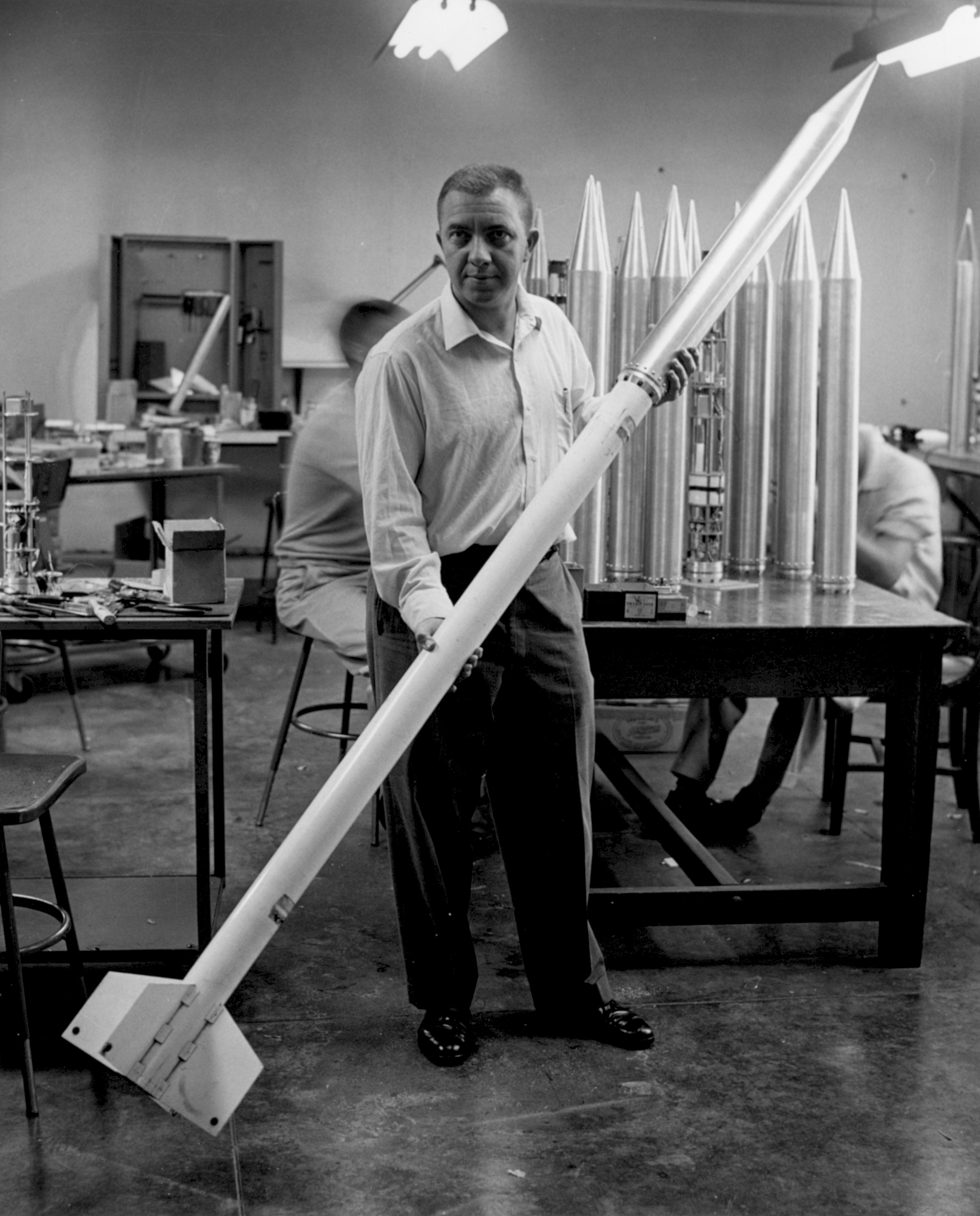
James Van Allen holding (Loki) instrumented Rockoon, Credit: JPL

The Office of Naval Research (USA ONR) used the Loki in some of its Rockoon launches, lofting the Loki to high altitudes on a helium balloon before firing, for upper atmosphere research. The first Rockoon launch of the Loki I occurred on Jul 1, 1955, from shipboard off the coast of Greenland.

During July–October 1955, instrumented Loki I and Deacon rockets were successfully balloon-launched (Rockoons) from shipboard off the coast of Greenland in cosmic-ray studies by the University of Iowa research group. Army Ordnance supplied JPL-developed Loki rockets, and ONR sponsored the project.

The first attempt of the Deacon Rockoon on Aug 21, 1952, 06:25 GMT from the Arctic Ocean 80.1 N x 68.5 W was a failure. However, success came on Aug 9, 1953, in the Atlantic Ocean, Launch Site 11, Launch Point 10 74.38 N x 71.93 W, at 05:54 GMT. This was quickly followed by another success on Aug 30, 1953, 20:46 GMT, at Atlantic Ocean Launch Site 11 Launch Point 13 53.13 N, 54.75 W.

In September 1957, as part of the U.S. contributions for the International Geophysical Year, thirty-six rockoons were launched from the Navy icebreaker USS Glacier (AGB-4) in Atlantic, Pacific, and Antarctic areas ranging from 75° N. to 72° S. latitude, as part of the scientific program headed by Van Allen together with Lawrence J. Cahill of the University of Iowa. These were the first known upper atmosphere rocket soundings in the Antarctic area. Launched from IGY Rockoon Launch Site 2, Atlantic Ocean; Latitude: 0.83° N, Longitude: 0.99° W.

== Recent usage ==
More recently, the JP Aerospace company has developed and used rockoons as part of its space access plans. Additionally, Iowa State University, the University of Alabama in Huntsville, and Purdue University (Purdue Orbital) have started programs to develop rockoons and significant work has been recently done by Leo Aerospace, based in Los Angeles, and a Romanian space company, ARCASPACE. The Spanish company Zero2infinity plans to launch a toroid-shaped rocket from a balloon called Bloostar in 2018 to carry micro satellites to low Earth orbit. UK-based company, B2Space, is developing the concept to launch small satellites into low Earth orbit. The American company Deimos-One is developing an AI-assisted concept to launch rockets and carry satellites to low Earth orbit.

The University of Washington investigated Rockoon launches between 2006 and 2014.

== See also ==
- Air launch to orbit
- CU Spaceflight
- Da Vinci Project
- JP Aerospace
- Low-Density Supersonic Decelerator
- Non-rocket spacelaunch
- Zero2infinity's Bloostar
- Deimos-One's Vulcan

== Sources ==
- "Encyclopedia Astronautica - Rockoon". Archived from the original on 2013-11-08.
- Leland Goodwin, Harold (1963). The Flying Stingaree. Rick Brant Science-Adventure Series.
