= Atmospheric station-keeping =

Maneuvers made to maintain a particular location in relation to the earth

In aeronautics, atmospheric station-keeping is keeping an aircraft in a specified region about the Earth. For an aerostat such as a balloon this could be achieved either by propelling the craft laterally against the wind or by utilizing altitude control mechanisms causing the balloon to go up and down in the sky where it can access different wind layers where the wind is blowing in different directions allowing the system to continually turn into or return to the region of interest allowing it to functionally stay still.

In some cases, such as the flight of Loon LLC balloons, machine learning models were employed alongside altitude control systems with superpressure balloon technology to keep balloons floating in specified regions for as long as 39 days.

Because high-altitude balloon systems float in the sky without consuming any energy, and can employ solar power for any auxiliary power needs, there is no fundamental reason they cannot persist indefinitely at float in the sky. Combining the long duration capability of high altitude flight vehicles with an ability to use altitude control for atmospheric station-keeping allows some high altitude vehicles, including high-altitude balloon systems and high-altitude platform station systems, to function like satellite systems in geostationary orbit while being much closer to the Earth.

== History ==
References to aeronauts attempting to keep aircraft from flying away by propelling or guiding them to favorable winds perpetually back towards an area of interest (the earliest version of something that resemble atmospheric station-keeping) date back well over a hundred years to the first balloonists attempting to turn balloons around and steer them back towards their launch sites by venting gas out a valve on the top of the balloon to make them go down into different winds than those at higher altitudes. The modern hot air balloon can perform control maneuvers in both directions by either heating the gas inside the balloon to go up, or venting air out of the balloon to go down (which can also be achieved by simply waiting, and allowing the gas inside the balloon to cool, which will also cause the balloon to go down). Through this process, it is regular practice for balloon pilots to use variable winds at different altitudes to keep balloons within a target station, often near the launch site.

== See also ==
- Orbital station keeping
