= Inspiration Mars Foundation =

Defunct, proposed a crewed flyby mission

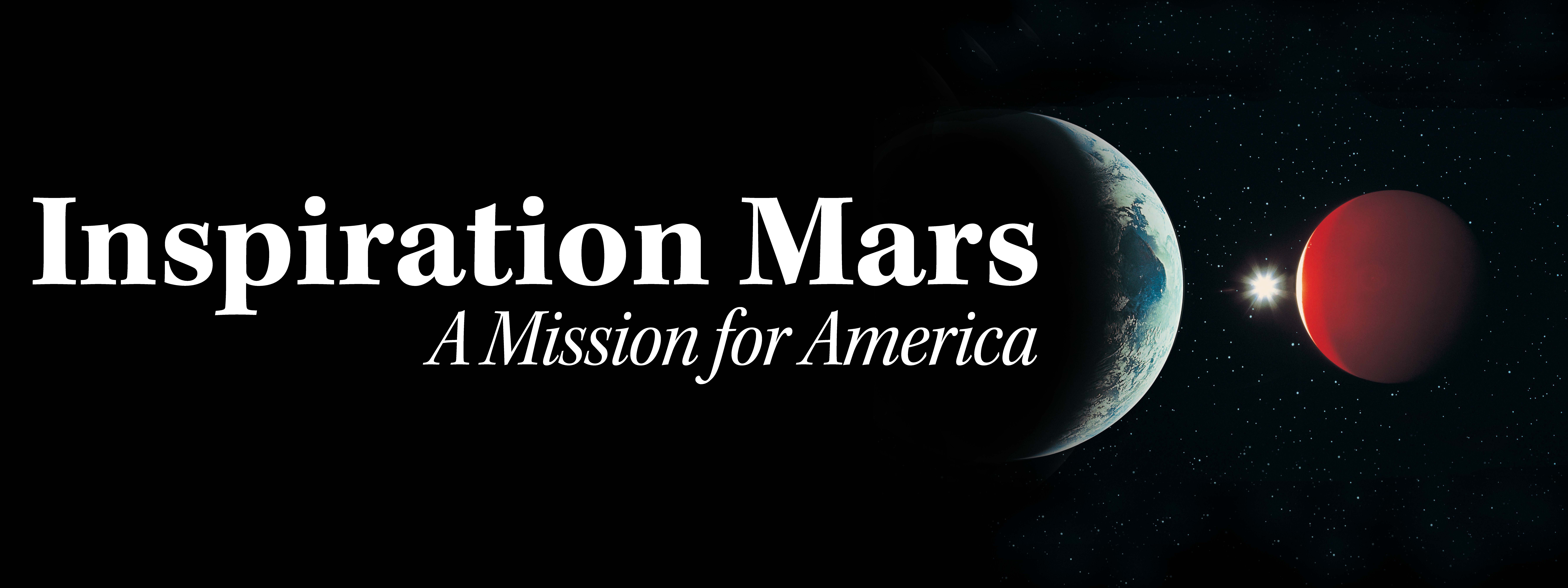
- "Send Two People, Take Everyone"
- Founded: 25 January 2013; 13 years ago
- Founder: Dennis Tito
- Type: 501(c)(3) (pending, as of April 2013)
- Purpose: 2018 crewed Mars Flyby, or alternatively a 2021 Venus flyby followed by a Mars flyby
- Location: Delaware, U.S.
- Region served: Earth/Mars/Venus
- Key people: Dennis Tito; Jane Poynter; Taber MacCallum; Joe Rothenberg; Miles O'Brien; Jonathan Clark; Thomas Squire

Inspiration Mars Foundation was an American nonprofit organization founded by Dennis Tito that in 2013 proposed to launch a crewed mission to flyby Mars in January 2018, or 2021 if they missed the first synodic opportunity in 2018.

Their website became defunct by late 2015. They are no longer operating.

== Plans ==
On 27 February 2013, the Inspiration Mars Foundation held a press conference in the National Press Club. They announce plans to procure space hardware, launch vehicle services, and select a two-person married couple as crew, and then raise the funding necessary to launch a mission to Mars in 2018. Dennis Tito said he would fund the foundation with $100 million for the first years of operation.

At the 2013 conference, however, Dennis Tito admitted that his plan was impossible without investment from NASA and the use of NASA spacecraft. NASA, however, was not willing to become a partner.

=== Funding ===
They projected costs of the mission between US$1–2 billion. Tito said he would fund the foundation's cost for the first two years and planned to raise funds from industry and individuals for the mission.

But in testimony before Congress in November 2013, Tito said that he expected private donors would only provide around $300 million, leaving the need for an additional investment of $700 million from the US government. NASA responded that while they were willing to share technical and programmatic expertise, they would not commit to sharing expenses with the organization. The foundation's funding model, dependent on a non-existent partner, never took form.

In March 2014, SpaceX said that they also had been contacted by Inspiration Mars, but that accommodating such requirements would require some additional work and that such work was not the current focus of SpaceX.

== Mission trajectory as proposed ==
Approximate Inspiration Mars Trajectory (not to scale)

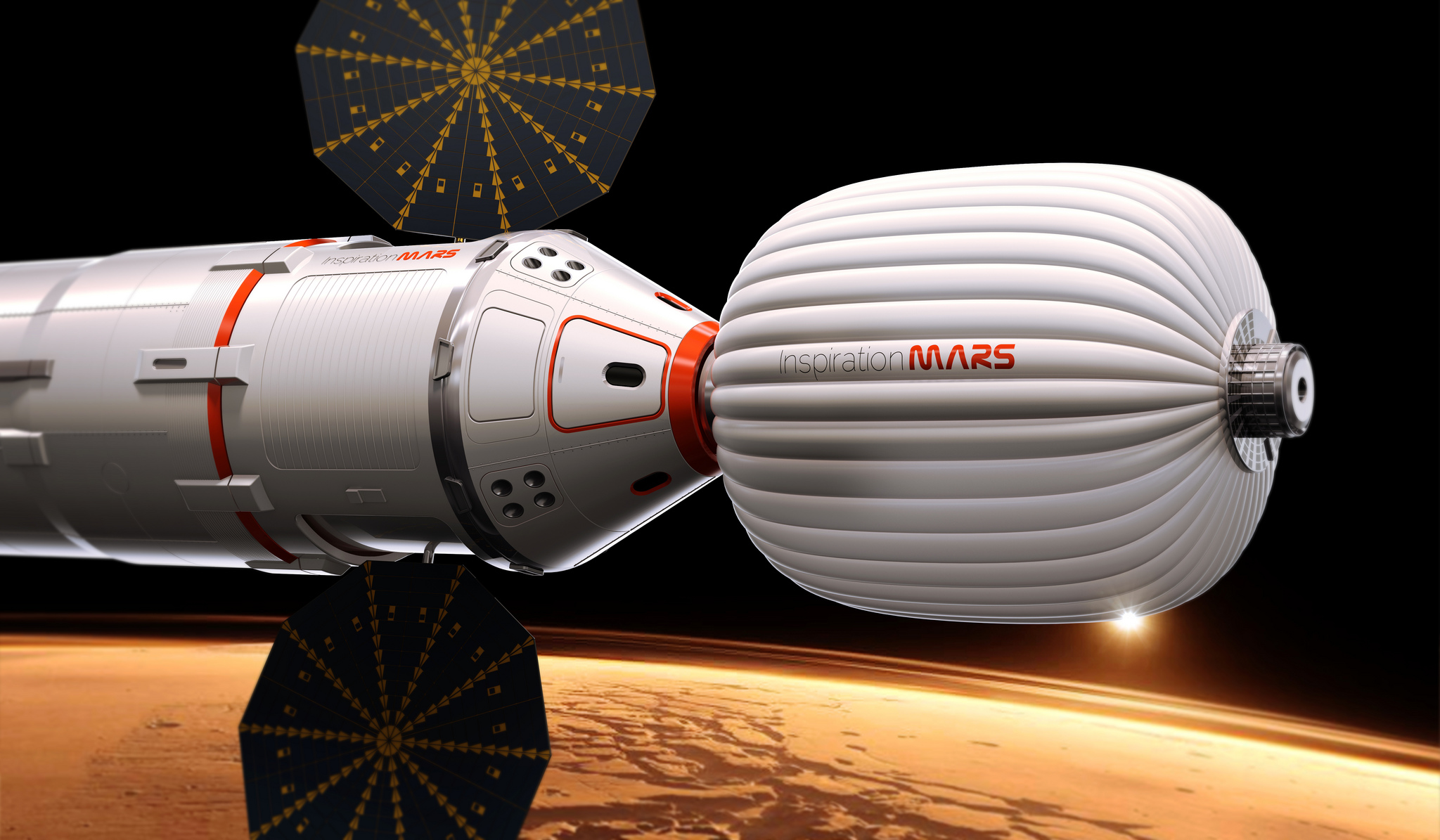
Artist's Concept of Inspiration Mars Capsule and Hab

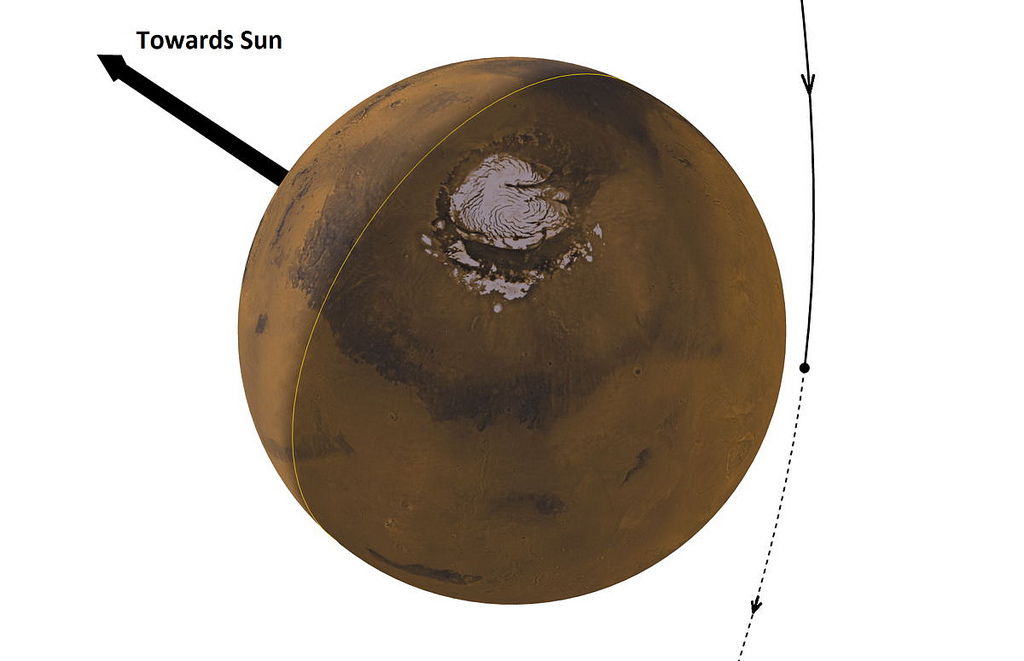
Inspiration Mars Periapsis

They proposed a free return trajectory to allow the spacecraft to use the smallest possible amount of propellant to flyby Mars and return to Earth. They stated that the January 2018 launch window offered a rare orbit opportunity to travel to Mars and return to Earth in 501 days.

Their stated backup plan involved a mission beginning in 2021 but it would be 88 days longer. They stated it would require both a flyby of Venus and Mars. The flight would take the spacecraft within 800 kilometres of the surface of Venus, using the planet for a gravity assist to speed the travel to Mars.

According to a paper written by Tito, "the mission would require no maneuvers except small course corrections after a trans-Martian injection burn, [and] would allow no aborts. ... [It will] use low Earth orbit launch and crewed-spacecraft technology, outfitted for the long duration of a flight to Mars." They speculated that when the spacecraft returned to Earth it would reenter the atmosphere at 50 000 km per hour (ca 13.9 km/s), faster than any previous return.

=== Student design competition ===
During the 16th Annual International Mars Society Convention in 2013, the Mars Society announced an international engineering competition for student teams to propose designs for the architecture of the mission. The contest was open to university engineering student teams. The design contest took place on 9 August 2014, and was won by an international team from Purdue University in US and Keio University in Japan.

== Criticism ==
A spokesman for NASA stated in February 2013 that "Inspiration Mars's proposed schedule is a significant challenge due to life support systems, space radiation response, habitats and the human psychology of being in a small spacecraft for over 500 days", but that "we remain open to further collaboration as their proposal and plans for a later mission develop".

John Logsdon, professor emeritus at George Washington University's Space Policy Institute, said the timeline was "totally implausible" for a mission to be launched in 2018, although the"Plan B" mission might be possible "if the stars align".

Their website became defunct in late 2015.

== See also ==
- Colonization of Mars
- Deep Space Industries – Former aerospace company
- Effect of spaceflight on the human body – Medical issues associated with spaceflight
- Human mission to Mars – Proposed concepts
- List of crewed Mars mission plans
- Mars Direct – Proposal for a crewed Mars mission
- Mars to Stay – Mars colonization architecture proposing no return vehicles
- Private spaceflight – Spaceflight not by a government
- The Case for Mars – Robert Zubrin book on potential colonization
