= Upper atmosphere =

Multiple regions of Earth's atmosphere

Upper atmosphere is the portion of the atmosphere of Earth above the troposphere and corresponding regions of the atmospheres of other planets. It includes various layers, such as the following:

- The mesosphere, which on Earth lies between the altitudes of about 50 and 80 km (31 and 50 mi), sometimes considered part of the "middle atmosphere" rather than the upper atmosphere.
- The thermosphere, which on Earth lies between the altitudes of about 80 and 700 km (50 and 435 mi).
- The exosphere, which on Earth lies between the altitudes of about 700 and 10,000 km (435 and 6,214 mi).
- The ionosphere, an ionized portion of the upper atmosphere which includes the upper mesosphere, thermosphere, and lower exosphere and on Earth lies between the altitudes of 50 and 1,000 km (31 and 621 mi).

The upper atmosphere may also include the stratosphere, which is where the majority of meteorological phenomena end, due to the cessation of convection at the stratosphere, evidenced by the leveling of cumulonimbus cloud tops at the tropopause.

The academic field which studies the upper atmosphere, is called aeronomy, and is contrasted by meteorology, the study of phenomena within the troposphere and lower stratosphere.

== See also ==
- Geospace
- Magnetosphere
- Near space
- Upper-atmospheric lightning
- Aeronomy
