= Balloon Experiments with Amateur Radio =

Amateur radio high altitude balloons

Balloon Experiments with Amateur Radio (BEAR) is a series of Canadian-based amateur radio high-altitude balloon experiments by a group of amateur radio operators and experimenters from Sherwood Park and Edmonton, Alberta. The experiments started in the year 2000 and continued with BEAR-9 in 2012 reaching 36,010 metres (118,140 ft).

The balloons are made of latex filled with either helium or hydrogen. All of the BEAR payloads carry a tracking system comprising a GPS receiver, an APRS encoder, and a radio transmitter module. Other experimental payload modules include an Amateur Radio crossband repeater, and a digital camera all of which is contained within an insulated foam box suspended below the balloon. A parachute recovery system is automatically deployed when the balloon bursts at altitude.

== BEAR-1 ==
On May 27, 2000, this helium-filled balloon with a payload of 0.977 kg (2 lb 2½ oz), was launched from the Bremner airport, and reached an altitude of 31,762 meters (104,206 feet). This first flight was a test of the GPS receiver used, to ensure that the unit successfully reported location information above the 60,000-foot limit imposed upon manufacturers, as well as the payload enclosure and antenna system to be used for future flights. A Pooh Bear mascot was also included in the payload for luck.

== BEAR-2 ==
This balloon was launched from an outdoor skating rink at Sherwood Park, Alberta, Canada, on August 5, 2000. It reached 30,322 meters (99,481 feet) before the balloon burst. It landed in the Battle River south of New Norway, but was successfully recovered. This payload contained the same tracking system as proven on BEAR-1, as well as a highly modified Icom IC-24AT handheld configured for crossband repeating. The radio was configured to receive on 446.100 MHz in the UHF band, and repeat the audio automatically on 146.520 MHz in the VHF band. Contacts were made with stations from Cold Lake, AB to Swift Current, SK as well as numerous contacts in the Edmonton, Red Deer, Calgary corridor in Alberta. A last-minute addition to the payload was an inexpensive digital camera. This camera was found to cause interference with the crossband radio on board, and was therefore turned off for the flight. The hole in the payload container for the camera ended up becoming an entry point for water from the river, causing major damage to the onboard electronics. This flight was originally scheduled to fly on July 15, 2000, but was scrubbed early in the evening of July 14 due to a tornado touching down at Pine Lake. Frequency and personnel resources were needed for disaster recovery efforts over the next few days dealing with the aftermath of the event, which left 12 dead.

== BEAR-3 ==
Reaching 35,475 meters (116,387 feet) on August 22, 2009, BEAR-3 achieved the highest altitude so far for the BEAR series of launches. This balloon was the first in the series to be filled with hydrogen instead of helium. The payload contained a Trimble Lassen iQ GPS, a Byonics Micro-Trak 300 and four AAA lithium L92 batteries. A custom payload enclosure was designed in an effort to attempt to produce an ultra-lightweight payload. A payload mass of 95.8 grams (3½ oz) was achieved, which puts it tied with the lightest payload in the Amateur Radio High Altitude Ballooning Records. This payload was recovered near Mundare, Alberta.

== BEAR-4 ==
The balloon was released on August 23, 2009. The flight duration was 3 hours 56 minutes and reached an altitude of 32,658 meters (107,145 feet). This flight was designed to lift a high-definition video camera to altitude, recording video from the entire flight for Tomoya Kamiko from Japan. Tomoya provided the camera, while the BEAR team provided the payload container, tracking hardware, parachute and balloon. This payload was recovered near Mannville, Alberta.

== BEAR-5 ==
BEAR-5 was launched on April 24, 2010. The APRS payload tracker IDs were VE6ATV-11 for the horizontal antenna and VE6ATV-12 for the vertical antenna. At the standard North American APRS frequency of 144.390 MHz.

== See also ==
- Columbia Scientific Balloon Facility
- Flight altitude record
- Flight endurance record
- High-altitude balloon
- High-altitude platform station
- Kite aerial photography
- Project Icarus (photography)
- Research balloon
- Spirit of Knoxville Amateur Trans-Atlantic Balloon Program
- Weather balloon
