= Urban Sky =

American aerospace company

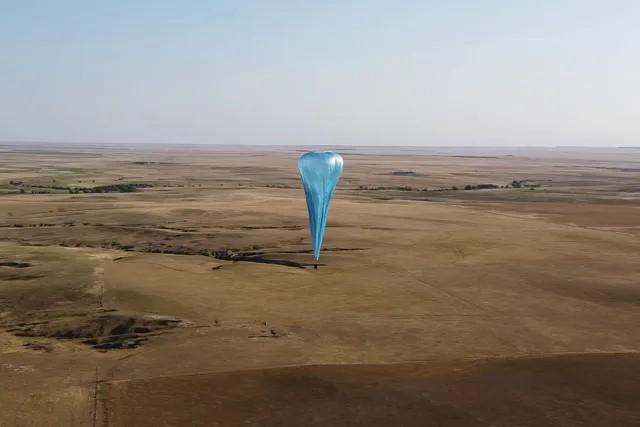
- Stratospheric microballoon
- Industry: Aerospace
- Headquarters: Denver, Colorado, United States
- Website: urbansky.com

Urban Sky is an American aerospace company headquartered in Denver, Colorado. Urban Sky designs, manufactures and operates small, altitude-stable stratospheric balloon systems used for earth observation and remote sensing applications. The balloon systems are described by the company as reusable and incorporate features such as altitude stability and limited navigational control in the stratosphere, as well as a smaller size compared to traditional Zero-pressure balloons. According to industry reports, about one third of all high altitude balloons flown in 2023 were built or operated by the company, excluding latex and weather balloons.

== History ==
Urban Sky was founded in 2019 to develop lower-cost stratospheric balloon systems for remote sensing applications, including through balloon miniaturization and new approaches to balloon control. In 2020, Urban Sky began routine stratospheric operations and reported reusing a stratospheric balloon during flight operations.

In 2022 Urban Sky initiated commercial operations after more than 50 test flights. The initial product Urban Sky released was an aerial imagery product at a resolution of 10 cm. Alongside its visual spectrum imager Urban Sky developed a long wave infrared imaging system funded by NASA for wildfire detection and monitoring. That same year, Urban Sky received three U.S. Air Force grants to develop new sensor systems including a real-time thermal sensor developed in partnership with the University of Colorado. In 2022, Urban Sky was awarded a National Science Foundation grant to develop balloon placement technologies.

In 2023, Urban Sky was selected as a winner of the National Security Innovation Network challenge for their remote sensing technologies. The same year, they started flying communications-related missions with a first stratospheric communications flight, partnered with goTenna. Two balloons were flown during the demonstration, both maintaining an altitude of 57,000 feet simultaneously in the five-hour flight, forming a line-of-sight communications network spanning around 14,412 square miles.

In October of 2023, the company closed a $9.75M Series A funding round to expand imaging operations in the western United States. In 2024, the company announced multiple wildfire campaigns and was selected as one of two companies to participate in NASA's FireSense campaign. It also announced the development of a new long-wave infrared sensor for early wildfire detection and live mapping.

As of 2023, the company had raised at least $13.8 million in publicly disclosed funding rounds.

== Microballoon technology ==
Urban Sky's remote-sensing balloons operate in the stratosphere at an altitude of approximately 20km (around 65,000 feet), and are roughly the size of a car at launch, with a payload attached beneath the balloon. The balloons increase in volume as they ascend and are roughly 11 times larger in the stratosphere than when near ground level. The balloons are propelled by the wind, allowing them to drift over predetermined targets from mobile launch locations depending on seasonal conditions. The small balloons operate under the same regulatory category as weather balloons, limiting payload mass to 2.7 kg per package.

In 2023, the company reported operating more than one stratospheric flight per week in the western United States. According to the 2023 American Institute of Aeronautics and Astronautics Balloon Technical Committee year-end report and the StratoCat balloon flight database, which showed collectively 98 high altitude balloon flights flown by other operators in 2023, the Microballoon was identified as the third most common type of high altitude balloon after latex and weather balloons.

== See also ==
- High-altitude balloon
- Alan Eustace
- StratEx
- World View
- Zero-pressure balloons
