= Super-pressure Balloon-borne Imaging Telescope =

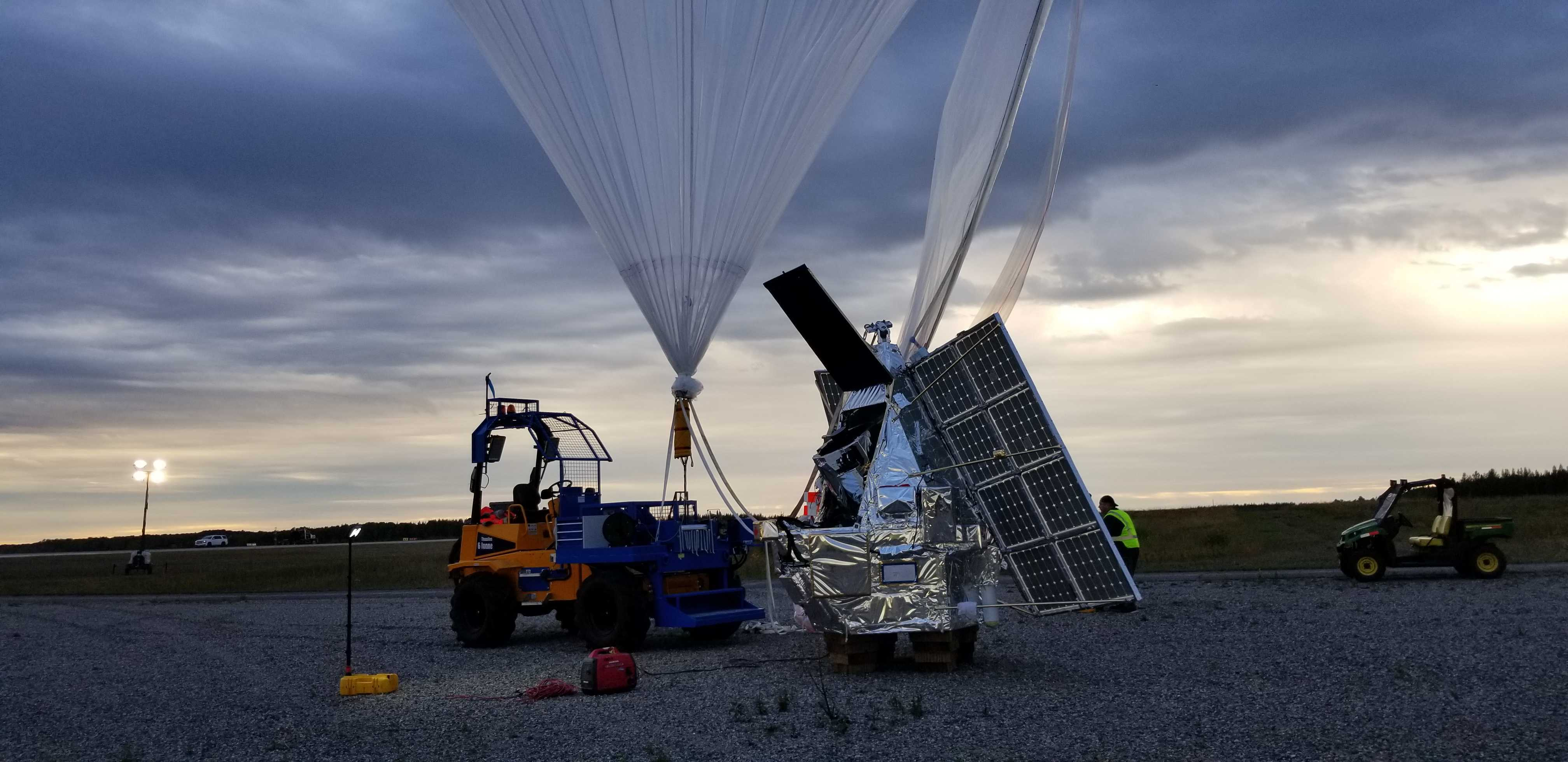
SuperBIT's final engineering test flight in 2019, pre-launch. This final qualification flight verified SuperBIT's diffraction-limited optical performance and served as a final confirmation of engineering specifications.

The Super-pressure Balloon-borne Imaging Telescope (SuperBIT) is a highly stabilized, high-resolution telescope that operates in the stratosphere via NASA's superpressure balloon (SPB) system. At approximately 35 km altitude above sea level, the football-stadium-sized balloon carries SuperBIT (at 3500 lbs) to a suborbital environment above 99.2% of the Earth's atmosphere in order to obtain space-quality imaging. As a research instrument, SuperBIT's primary science goal is to provide insight into the distribution of dark matter in galaxy clusters and throughout the large-scale structure of the universe. As demonstrated by numerous test flights, the survey data generated by SuperBIT is expected to have similar quality and data collection efficiency as the Hubble Space Telescope while complementing surveys from other up-and-coming observatories such as the James Webb Space Telescope (JWST), the Vera C. Rubin Observatory (formerly LSST), and the Nancy Grace Roman Space Telescope (formerly WFIRST).

== Technical details and science goals ==
SuperBIT is a 0.5 m, wide-field, diffraction-limited balloon-borne telescope that operates within the stratosphere - an altitude of nearly 34 km - to achieve space-like operating conditions and performance. With optical sensitivity from the near infrared (900 nm) to the near ultraviolet (300 nm), SuperBIT aims to make precise weak gravitational lensing measurements of galaxy clusters in order to infer the presence and relative quantity of dark matter in these clusters, as well as the large-scale structure of the universe. To achieve high-precision measurements from a balloon-borne environment, the SuperBIT gondola – at roughly 3500 lbs – stabilizes its telescope to sub-arcsecond precision (akin to a three degree-of-freedom Steadicam) while sophisticated optics further stabilize the SuperBIT camera to < 50 milliarcseconds. A useful analogy for this level of stability is threading a needle at the top of the CN Tower from Toronto's Centre Island (roughly 2.5 km away) and keeping the thread from touching the sides of the needle for up to 60 minutes. This level of precision, coupled with diffraction-limited optics and a large 0.5-degree field-of-view, enables SuperBIT to undertake astronomical surveys at a cadence and quality that rivals the Hubble Space Telescope. In this sense, one of SuperBIT's over-arching science and technology development goals is to make rapidly developed yet highly capable suborbital astronomical platforms more accessible to the astronomical community at a fraction of the cost of an equivalent space- or satellite-based system of equivalent capability.

SuperBIT completed a successful long duration science mission after launching from Wānaka, New Zealand in March 2023 in one of the longest missions ever flown on NASA's superpressure balloon (SPB) system. The benefit of this relatively novel SPB system over conventional zero-pressure balloon systems is that stratospheric operations can be supported through diurnal cycles for more than 30 days, enabling SuperBIT to collect the images and data necessary to meet weak-lensing science requirements.

== History and development ==
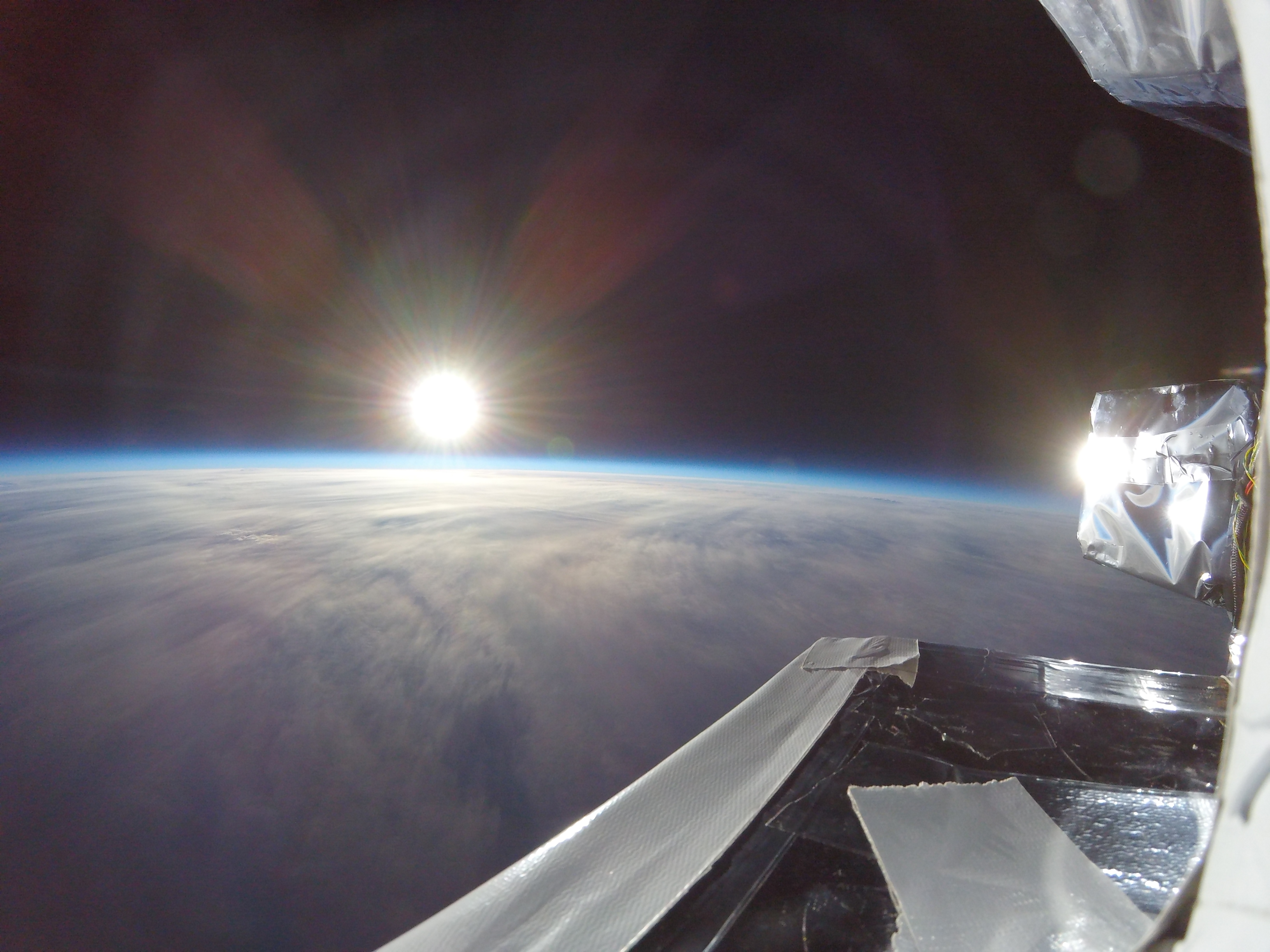
SuperBIT's first engineering flight (2015) at 40 km above the Earth's surface. Launched from Timmins, Ontario in northern Canada, this image was captured before successful flight termination just after dawn on September 19, 2015.

SuperBIT was originally developed at the University of Toronto led by Barth Netterfield's Balloon Astronomy Group (originally named the Balloon-borne Imaging Test-bed) with contributions and engineering development from UTIAS. With design efforts commencing in summer of 2012, the original BIT team fabricated, assembled, integrated, tested, and launched BIT on its maiden engineering test flight in 2015. Launch took place from Timmins, Ontario and was facilitated by the Canadian Space Agency and CNES. Following this engineering success, SuperBIT was refurbished and relaunched in the summers of 2016 and 2018 with continual engineering improvements and refinement of overall instrument performance in collaboration with Princeton University, Durham University's Centre for Advanced Instrumentation, and Jet Propulsion Laboratory (JPL). For both of these engineering test flights, launch took place from Palestine, Texas and was facilitated by NASA's Columbia Scientific Balloon Facility.

In 2019, SuperBIT had its final science qualification flight, which was the first flight that utilized space-qualified telescope optics for science imaging, and an upgraded cameras. With SuperBIT's flight tested stabilization system, the SuperBIT 2019 flight from Timmins, Ontario with CNES-CSA demonstrated a robust ability to perform wide-field, diffraction-limited imaging from the stratosphere in optical bands as well as in the near-infrared and near-ultraviolet. This was the final test flight necessary to qualify the SuperBIT system for science operations during its upcoming and final long duration flight from Wānaka, New Zealand, the results from which will offer significant contributions to galaxy cluster studies, weak lensing science, and dark matter cosmology.

The budget for construction and development, through the first mission, is about $5 million.

=== First Mission ===
The first official mission was launched in on 16 April 2023 from Wānaka, New Zealand. The goal was to stay aloft for three months and perform a soft landing, so the telescope could be re-used again in future missions. The telescope communicated with earth via two systems: the Starlink satellite system, and the Starlink satellite constellation, and the Tracking and Data Relay Satellite System (TDRSS). The connection to Starlink was lost on 1 May 2023, and the connection to TDRSS became unstable on 24 May 2023. During the mission, the telescope obtained near-UV and optical imaging of galaxy clusters and other astronomical objects. Due to the lack of connection to the ground, a decision was made to land the telescope early, and it descended on 25 May 2023, in Argentina. The telescope was destroyed during the landing; it was dragged along the ground for 3km because the parachute failed to separate upon landing. The complete dataset was recovered from small capsules containing backup copies of the data that dropped by parachute, although the flight computer storage systems were also successfully recovered. A small portion of the data from this flight were featured as NASA's Astronomy Picture of the Day for April 17, 2023

== Contributions to science and engineering ==
Although SuperBIT's primary science goals is centered around weak gravitational lensing and large scale structure, the development of SuperBIT has produced notable contributions in the fields of balloon-borne engineering, measuring the near-ultraviolet to near-infrared of sky background levels at stratospheric altitudes, and techniques for suborbital operations. Specifically, SuperBIT has established standards and general design methodologies for balloon-borne payloads in the areas of attitude dynamics and control; suborbital mechanical modelling and design; thermal modelling and mitigation; and electromechanical techniques for balloon-borne instruments. The optical transmission at stratospheric altitudes was measured at depth to inform SuperBIT science sensitivity in detail. In general, this information is useful for the design of a wide range of balloon-borne instrumentation.

=== Data communications downlink by parachute ===
To support the data requirements for SuperBIT's relatively high data rate, a system for physical downlinking was developed, launched, and tested during SuperBIT's 2019 engineering test flight. This system and the tracking techniques surrounding it was successful in deployment from the stratosphere and recovery on the ground to high accuracy, thus allowing highly reliable "downlink" of science data during SuperBIT's upcoming 2022 science flight. This system is currently being utilized for a number of similar high altitude applications with similar data requirements.

== Further applications ==
In addition to astronomy, applications for high precision attitude dynamics and control and highly stabilized imaging from space and near-space environments include high resolution earth observation and high-bandwidth laser-based telecommunications systems, both in research and for commercial sectors. Given the success of SuperBIT to date, SuperBIT's core team of university researchers has formed StarSpec Technologies, a suborbital and space-based technologies company intended to lower the barrier to entry to space and near-space environments in both cost and overall development time. Based on SuperBIT's success, StarSpec Technologies is currently contracted for a number of high precision instrumentation including NASA's EXoplanet Climate Infrared TElescope project aimed at characterizing exoplanet atmospheres from the stratosphere.

== See also ==
- Ultraviolet astronomy
