= Vincent E. Lally =

- Born: October 13, 1922; Brookline, Massachusetts
- Died: September 20, 2005 (aged 82); Boulder, Colorado
- Education: University of Chicago, B.S. 1944 (Meteorology) Harvard University - M.I.T., Certificate, (Radar Engineering) 1944 M.I.T., B.S. 1948 (Electronic Engineering) M.I.T., M.S. 1949 (Engineering Administration)
- Awards: Cleveland Abbe Award for distinguished service to the atmospheric sciences by an individual, 1990 Otto C. Winzen Lifetime Achievement Award, 2003
- Scientific career
- Fields: Meteorology
- Workplaces: 1943-1946 Radar Officer and Meteorologist 1949-1951 Development Engineer, Bendix-Friez 1951-1958 Chief, Meteorological Equipment Development, Air Force Cambridge Research Center 1958-1961 Research Manager, Teledynamics Division, American Bosch Arma Corporation 1961-1965 Director, National Scientific Balloon Facility 1965-1991 Manager, GAMP (Global Atmospheric Measurements Program), NCAR (National Center for Atmospheric Research)

Vincent E. Lally (October 13, 1922 – September 20, 2005) received a B.S. in Meteorology from the University of Chicago in 1944. After service in the Pacific as a meteorologist and radar officer in the Army Air Corps, Lally returned to M.I.T. where he received the degrees of B.S. in Electrical Engineering in 1948 and M.S, in Engineering Administration in 1949. From 1951 to 1958, he worked at the Geophysics Research Directorate of the Air Force Cambridge Research Center where he was the leader of the meteorological equipment development program for the Air Force. From 1958 to 1961, he was manager of research at Teledynamics, Inc., and then accepted appointment at the newly formed National Center for Atmospheric Research (NCAR) as Director of the National Scientific Balloon Facility. In 1965, he established the Global Atmospheric Research Program (GARP) to develop long-duration balloons.

Vincent E. Lally with balloon in 1960s. According to Marcel Verstraete (2011), Ernie Litchfield is on the far right of Lally and Bob Frickman and Sam Solat are on left.

Early 1960s launch of a zero-pressure balloon from the floor of Glen Canyon before a scientific balloon facility was operational. The windbreak provided by the Glen Canyon Dam provided an ideal location for inflating and launching balloons. After the dam was complete, however, the canyon was flooded to create Lake Powell.

== Scientific achievements ==
In addition to leading the national program to develop facilities for scientific ballooning, Lally made a number of major contribution to the use of balloons as a vehicle for atmospheric measurements. The demonstration of the capability to fly superpressure balloons on multiple orbits of the globe was the critical experiment which triggered international support for the Global Atmospheric Research Program. In 1966, NCAR scientists launched a globe-circling balloon from Christchurch, New Zealand. This was one of a series of global horizontal sounding technique (GHOST) balloons tested in order to collect meteorological data from all of the Earth's atmosphere and predict global weather on a long-range basis. The Rocket-Balloon-Instrument sphere (ROBIN), designed in 1955, was the principal vehicle for rocket soundings of the atmosphere. Lally also developed the technique for reliable erection of space-inflatables. The Radiation-Controlled Balloon (RACOON) demonstrated in 1980 that the radiation-environment rather than ballast could achieve long-duration flight for zero-pressure balloons. It became the standard technique for global flight and recovery of heavy scientific payloads.

== Publications ==
Lally authored over 30 papers on instrumentation, ballooning, and navigation techniques. he wrote the definitive publication on superpressure-ballooning as well as chapters in several handbooks on ballooning and atmospheric sounding systems.
