= Barth Netterfield =

Canadian astrophysicist (born 1968)

- Citizenship: Canadian; American
- Education: Princeton University
- Known for: Balloon-borne telescopes, observational cosmology
- Scientific career
- Fields: Astrophysics
- Institutions: University of Toronto
- Doctoral advisor: Lyman Page
- Doctoral students: Juan Diego Soler
- Website: www.astro.utoronto.ca/~netterfield

Calvin Barth Netterfield (born 29 April 1968), is a Canadian astrophysicist, and a Professor in the Department of Astronomy and the Department of Physics at the University of Toronto. He is a leading expert in the development of balloon-borne telescopes. These are astrophysical experiments that are lifted into the stratosphere by high-altitude balloons where they conduct observations that would be hindered by atmospheric interference if done on the ground. Netterfield is primarily known for his work in observational cosmology, specifically in developing instrumentation to observe the cosmic microwave background (CMB) radiation. Most notably, he was a key member of the instrument team for BOOMERANG, the experiment that made one of the first accurate determinations of the age, geometry, and mass-energy content of the universe. More recently, he has delved into the field of submillimetre astronomy and the physics of star formation, through his involvement with the BLAST telescope. Netterfield was featured prominently in BLAST!, a documentary film about the 2005 and 2006 flights of BLAST from Sweden and Antarctica.

== Early life and education ==
Netterfield grew up in Surrey, British Columbia. He developed an interest in astronomy from an early age simply by going outside and looking at the stars. His interest in physics was also fostered by his Grade 10 mathematics teacher, who encouraged him to read about relativity. Netterfield graduated high school from Queen Elizabeth Secondary School, Surrey, British Columbia, in 1986. Netterfield eventually moved to Minnesota where he earned a B.S. degree in physics from Bethel College. He went on to do his Ph.D. in physics at Princeton University under the supervision of Lyman Page. He completed his thesis in 1995 on the measurement of the degree-scale anisotropy of the CMB with the ground-based experiment Saskatoon. He then became a Millikan Postdoctoral Research Fellow at the California Institute of Technology until 1999, when he was granted a faculty position at the University of Toronto.

== Current Research ==
Professor Netterfield is the head of the Balloon Astrophysics or "BALLAST" research group at the University of Toronto. Along with his students, and in collaboration with research groups from other institutions worldwide, he is currently working on the design, assembly, and testing of three balloon-borne telescopes. The first, BLAST-Pol, is the BLAST telescope with added sensitivity to polarization, which enables it to observe magnetic fields in star formation regions. BLAST-Pol flew from Antarctica in December 2010 and is scheduled to do so again in December 2012. He is also working on Spider, a balloon-borne CMB polarization experiment that is designed to detect the imprint on the CMB of primordial gravitational waves that are predicted to have been produced by inflation in the very early universe. His third active project, the Super-pressure Balloon-borne Imaging Telescope (SuperBIT), is a wide-field, diffraction-limited, near-infrared to near-ultraviolet telescope capable of imaging resolution and quality at a level that rivals the Hubble Space Telescope. As one of the first astronomical imagers of its kind intended for the stratosphere, SuperBIT serves a prototype instrument for a more ambitious balloon-borne optical wide-field imaging telescope (under the project name GigaBIT).

== Other interests ==
Netterfield is an avid aviation enthusiast and computer programmer. He is the original developer of kst, an open-source, real-time data plotting program that he works on while riding the TTC.

== Awards ==
- 2008 NSERC E.W.R. Steacie Memorial Fellowship
- 2007 Canadian Association of Physicists Herzberg Medal
- 2001 Sloan Foundation Fellowship
