= ARCADE =

NASA space program

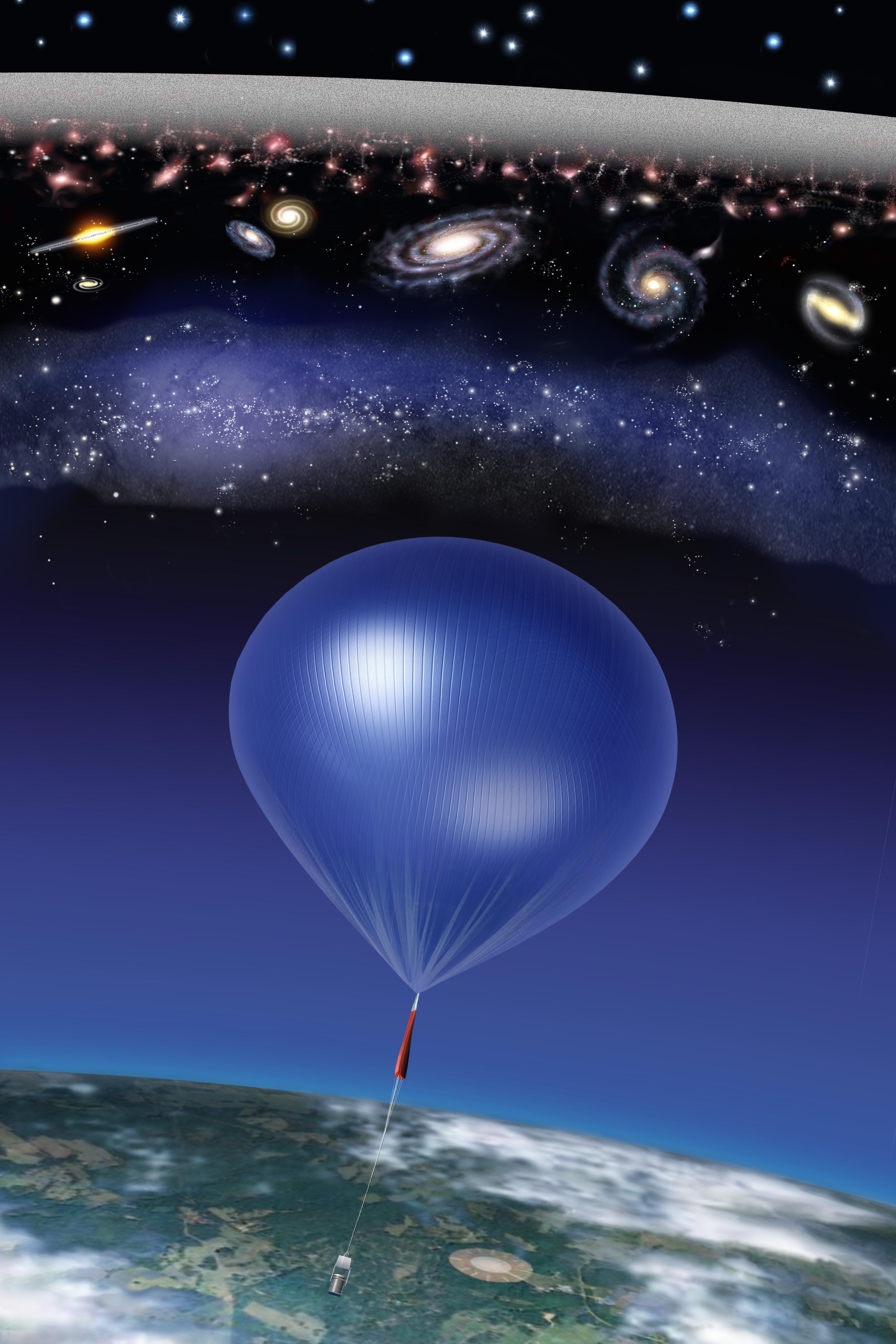
- Alternative names: Absolute Radiometer for Cosmology, Astrophysics, and Diffuse Emission
- Website: asd.gsfc.nasa.gov/archive/arcade/
- Related media on Commons

Absolute Radiometer for Cosmology, Astrophysics, and Diffuse Emission (ARCADE) is a program which utilizes high-altitude balloon instrument package intended to measure the heating of the universe by the first stars and galaxies after the big bang and search for the signal of relic decay or annihilation. In July 2006 a strong residual radio source was found using the radiometer, approximately six times what is predicted by theory. This phenomenon is known as "space roar" and remains an unsolved problem in astrophysics.

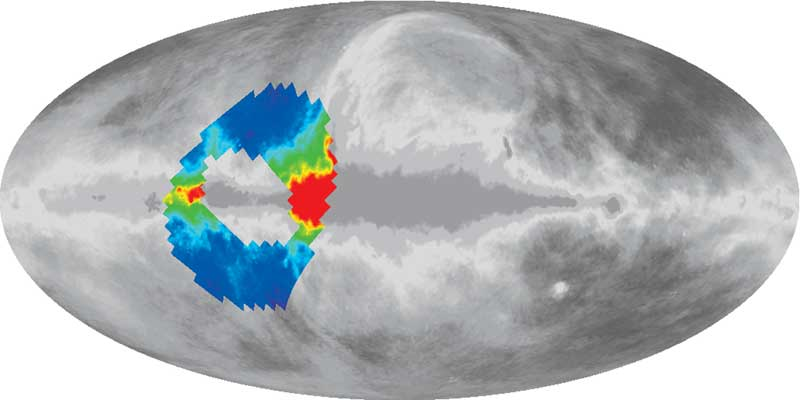
ARCADE viewed about 7% of the sky. The observed region is colored on this all-sky radio map. The plane of our galaxy, the Milky Way, runs across the center.

ARCADE has been funded by NASA's Science Mission Directorate under the Astronomy and Physics Research and Analysis Suborbital Investigation program. The program is composed of a team led by Alan Kogut of NASA's Goddard Space Flight Center. ARCADE was launched from NASA's Columbia Scientific Balloon Facility in Palestine, Texas, conducted under the auspices of the Balloon Program Office at Wallops Flight Facility. The balloon flew to an altitude of 120,000 feet (37 km), viewing about 7% of the sky during its observations.

The instrument is designed to detect radiation at centimeter wavelengths. The craft contained seven radiometers which were cooled to 2.7 K (−270.45 °C; −454.81 °F) using liquid helium, with the intent to measure temperature differences as small as 1/1000 of a degree against a background which is only 3 K (−270.15 °C; −454.27 °F). The optics in the instrument package were placed near the top of the dewar flask which cooled them in order to prevent the instruments from seeing the walls of the container, thereby simplifying the processing of the observational data. This design choice necessitated the use of superfluid pumps in order to drench the radiometers in liquid helium. The design also utilized heaters in order to create a cloud of helium gas, in place of using a (relatively warm) window, which also simplified processing of the observational data.

== Residual emission ==
In 2011, the ARCADE 2 researchers reported, "Correcting for instrumental systematic errors in measurements such as ARCADE 2 is always a primary concern. We emphasize that we detect residual emission at 3 GHz with the ARCADE 2 data, but the result is also independently detected by a combination of low-frequency data and FIRAS."

The ARCADE 2 science team came to the following conclusion concerning the unexpected residual emission at 3 GHz:

We conclude that the residual signature is due either to a diffuse extragalactic background of emission from discrete radio sources with properties somewhat different than the faint end of the distribution of known sources or to unmodeled residual emission from our own Galaxy. Although we believe the former to be more likely, we cannot exclude the latter explanation.

Radio waves have frequencies from 30 Hz to 300 GHz. The term space roar has been used to indicate the hypothesis that the ARCADE 2 results indicate that the actual faint end of the emission distribution of known sources is significantly different from the expected value predicted by the Lambda-CDM model given the known sources of emission. Possible hypothetical sources include diffuse large-scale turbulently merging clusters of galaxies or supernovae of the primary generations of stars.

== See also ==
- List of cosmic microwave background experiments
- Cosmic microwave background radiation
