= Research balloon =

Balloon used for scientific research

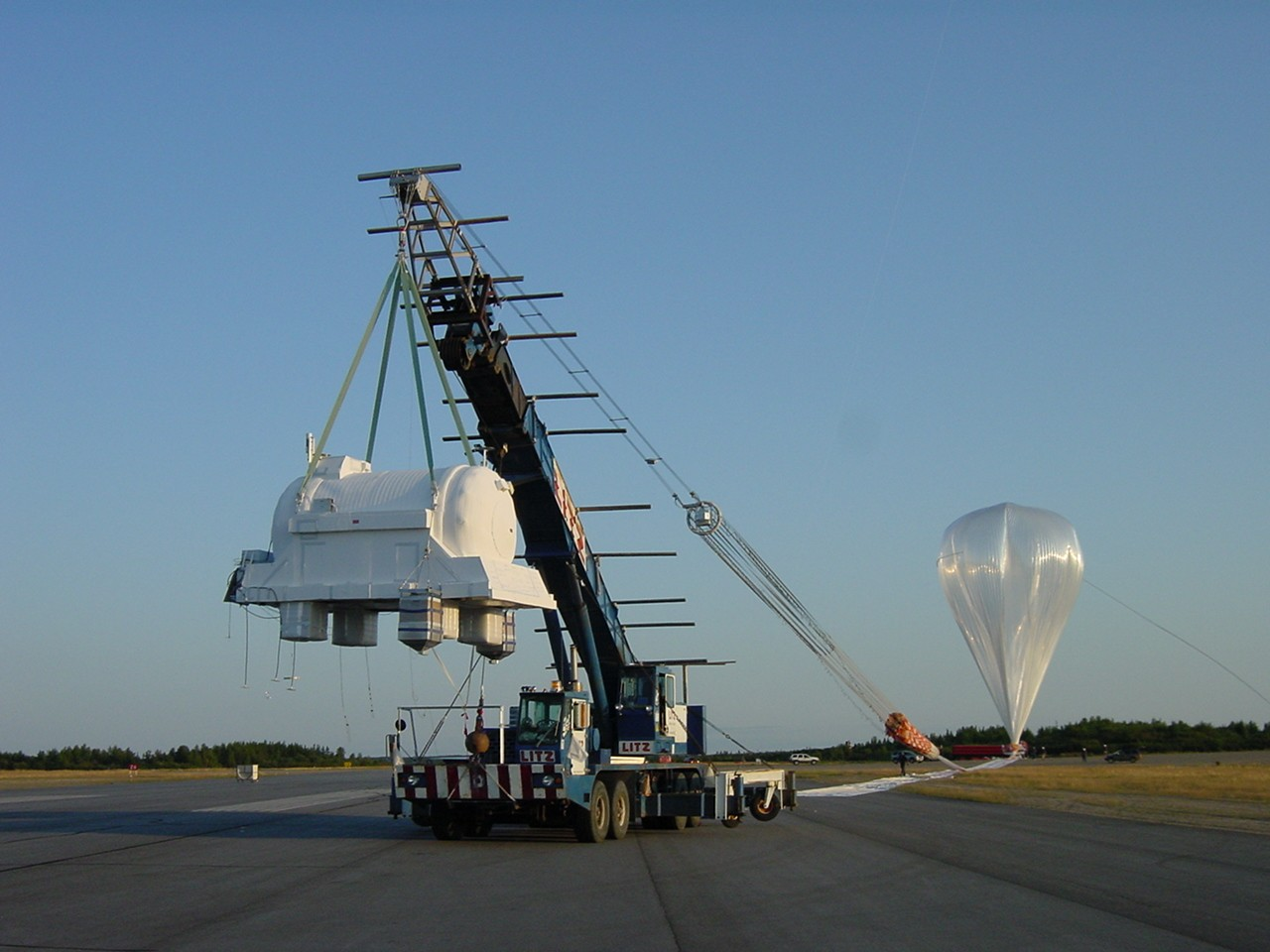
Research balloon ready for launch

Research balloons are balloons that are used for scientific research. They are usually unmanned, filled with a lighter-than-air gas like helium, and fly at high altitudes.

Meteorology, atmospheric research, astronomy, and military research may be conducted from a research balloon. Weather balloons are a type of research balloon. Research balloons usually study a single aspect of science, such as air pollution, air temperature, or wind currents, although sometimes several experiments or equipment are flown together.

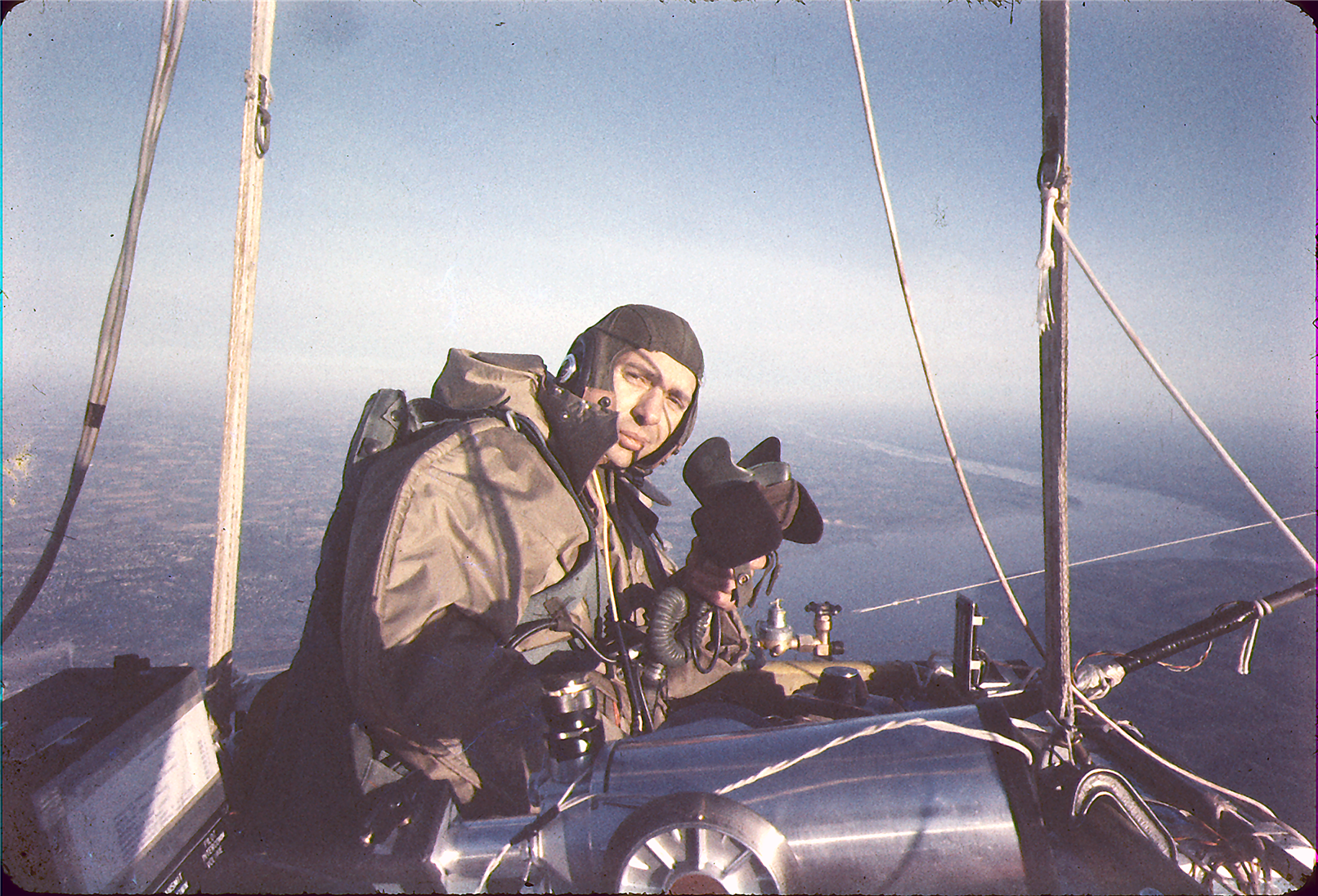
Malcolm Ross piloting a research balloon down from the stratosphere

Other than weather balloons, few research balloons are launched every year. This is driven by the large cost of the balloon, the instrument, which is usually custom made, and the cost of the launch. Because of the altitude reached by most research balloons, the air is too thin and too cold for humans to survive, therefore most research balloons are unmanned and operated remotely. There have been some balloons equipped with pressurized cabins, beginning with professor Auguste Piccard in the 1930s.

Research balloons are not only used on earth. With the help of a research balloon, the upper atmosphere of Venus was examined by the Vega program.

== See also ==
- High-altitude balloon
- Google Balloon Internet
- Columbia Scientific Balloon Facility
