= High-altitude balloon =

Balloon released into the stratosphere, most commonly weather balloons

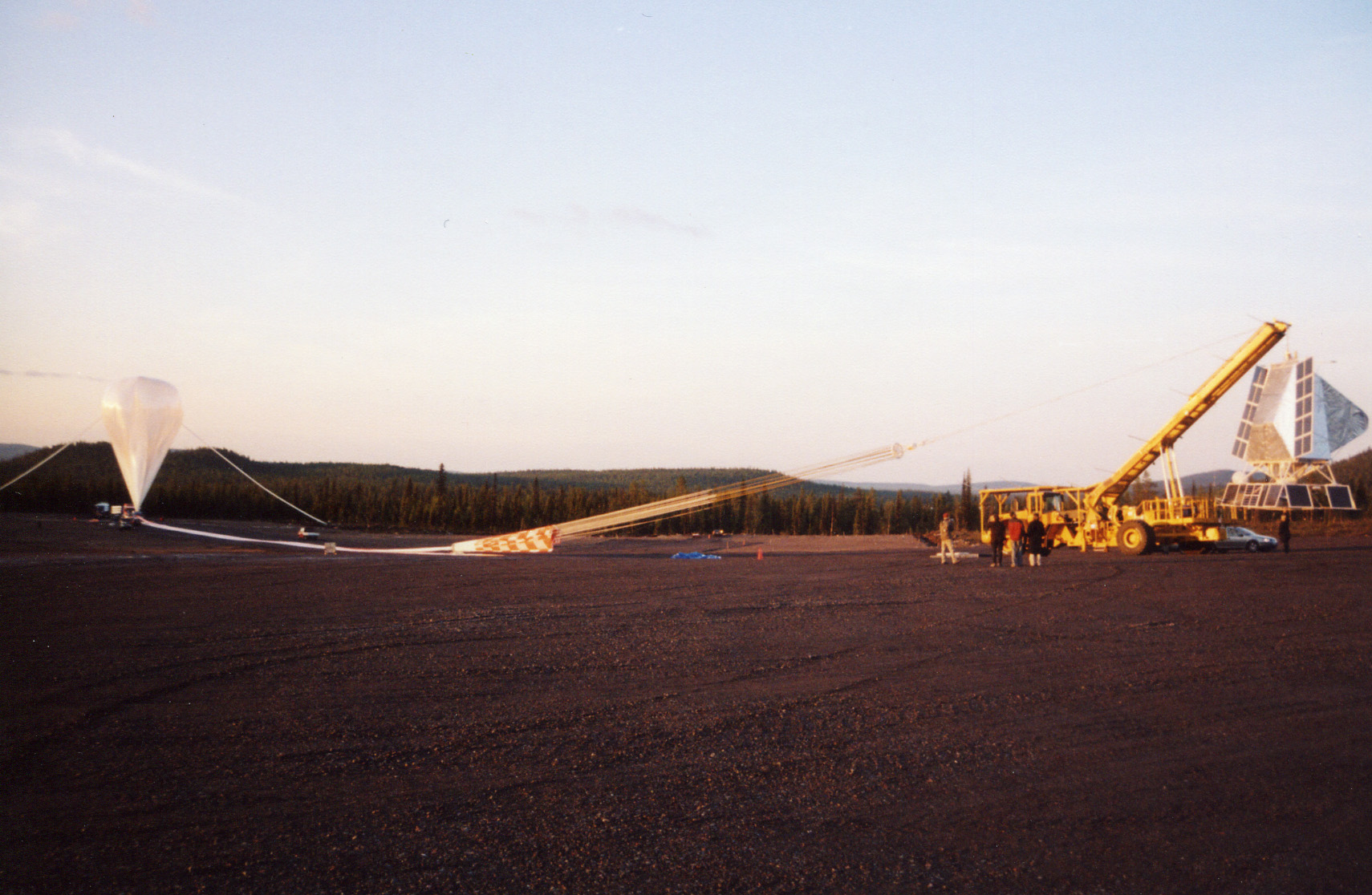
The BLAST high-altitude balloon just before launch on June 12, 2005

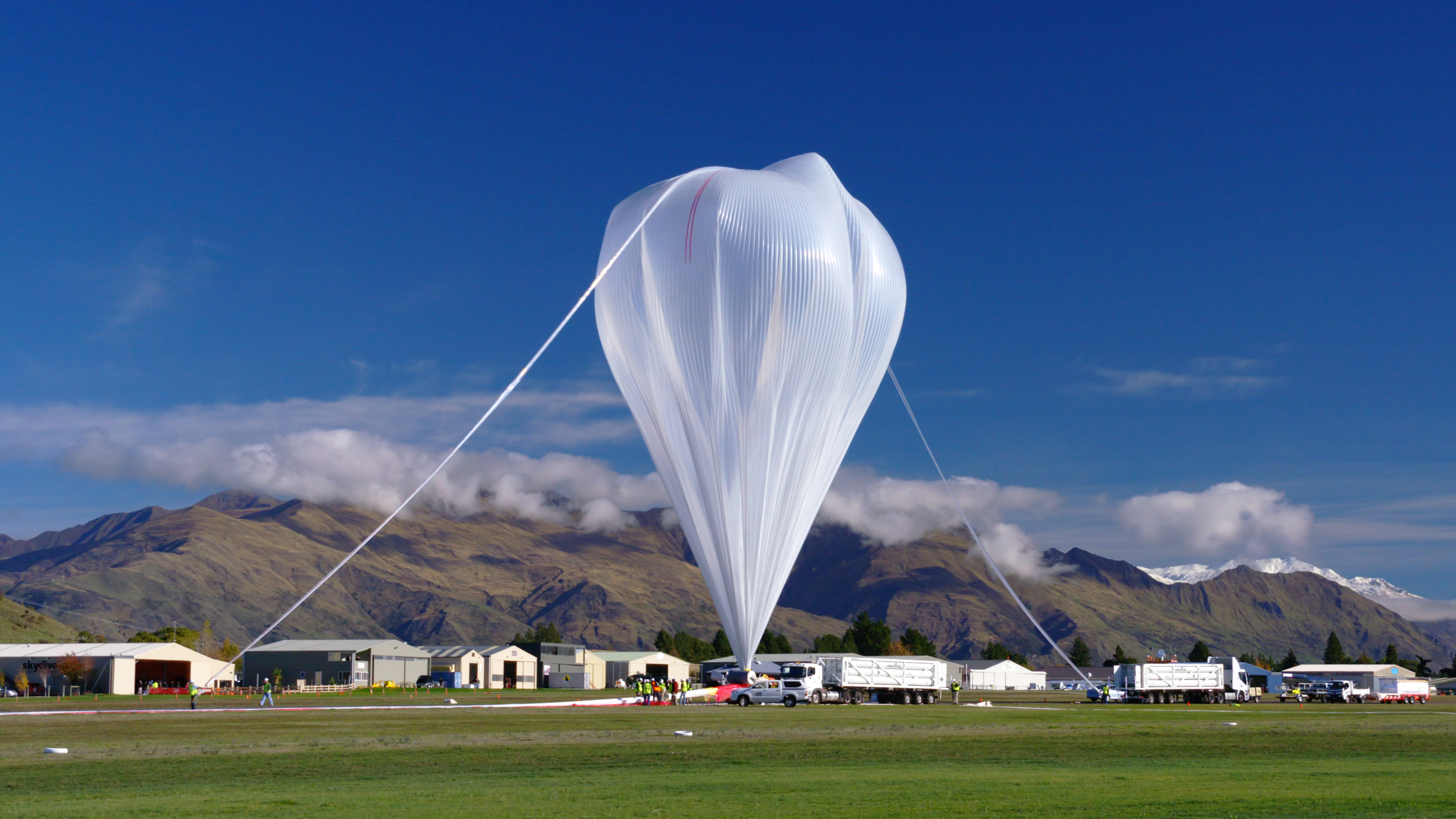
NASA Super Pressure Balloon (2016)

High-altitude balloons (HABs) or stratostats are usually uncrewed balloons typically filled with helium or hydrogen and released into the stratosphere, generally attaining between 18 and 37 km (11 and 23 mi; 59,000 and 121,000 ft) above sea level. In 2013, a balloon named BS 13-08 reached a record altitude of 53.7 km (33.4 mi; 176,000 ft).

The most common type of high-altitude balloons are weather balloons. Other purposes include use as a platform for experiments in the upper atmosphere. Modern balloons generally contain electronic equipment such as radio transmitters, cameras, or satellite navigation systems, such as GPS receivers. Hobbyists frequently purchase weather balloons because of their ease of use, low price point, and widespread commoditisation.

These balloons are launched into what is defined as "near space", defined as the area of Earth's atmosphere between the Armstrong limit (18–19 km (11–12 mi) above sea level), where pressure falls to the point that a human being cannot survive without a pressurised suit, and the Kármán line (100 km (62 mi) above sea level), where astrodynamics must take over from aerodynamics in order to maintain flight.

Due to the low cost of GPS and communications equipment, high-altitude ballooning is a popular hobby, with organizations such as UKHAS assisting the development of payloads.

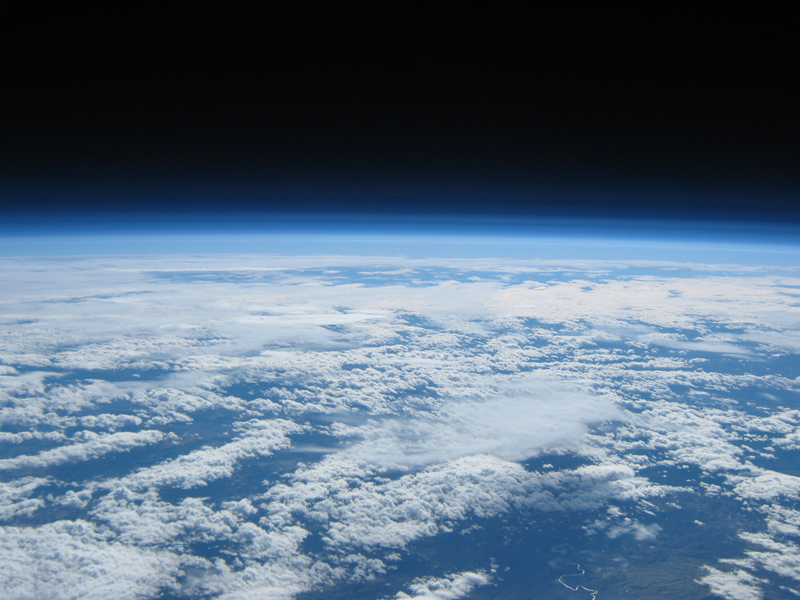
A photo taken from a 1,500 g (3.3 lb) weather balloon at approximately 100,000 ft (19 mi; 30 km) above Oregon

A latex weather balloon bursting at about 29.5 km (18.3 mi; 97,000 ft)

== History ==
=== The first hydrogen balloon ===
In France during 1783, the first public experiment with hydrogen-filled balloons involved Jacques Charles, a French professor of physics, and the Robert brothers, renowned constructors of physics instruments.

Charles provided large quantities of hydrogen, which had only been produced in small quantities previously, by mixing 540 kg (1,190 lb) of iron and 270 kg (600 lb) of sulfuric acid. The balloon took 5 days to fill and was launched from Champ de Mars in Paris where 300,000 people gathered to watch the spectacle. The balloon was launched and rose through the clouds. The expansion of the gas caused the balloon to tear and it descended 45 minutes later 20 km (12 mi) away from Paris.

=== Crewed high-altitude balloons ===
Crewed high-altitude balloons have been used since the 1930s for research and in seeking flight altitude records, including Auguste Piccard's flights up to 16,201 m (16.2 km), the Soviet Osoaviakhim-1 at 22,000 m (22.0 km), and the American Explorer II at 22,066 m (22.1 km).

Notable crewed high altitude balloon flights include three records set for highest skydive:

- the first set by Joseph Kittinger in 1960 at 31,300 m (31.3 km) for Project Excelsior
- followed by Felix Baumgartner in 2012 at 38,969 m (39.0 km) for Red Bull Stratos
- most recently Alan Eustace in 2014 at 41,419 m (41.4 km)

== Uses ==
Uncrewed high-altitude balloons are used as research balloons, for educational purposes, and by hobbyists. Common uses include meteorology, atmospheric and climate research, collection of imagery from near space, amateur radio applications, and submillimetre astronomy.

High-altitude balloons have been considered for use in telecommunications and space tourism. Private companies such as Zero 2 Infinity, Space Perspective, Zephalto, and World View Enterprises are developing both crewed and uncrewed high-altitude balloons for scientific research, commercial purposes, and space tourism. High-altitude platform stations have been proposed for applications such as communications relays.

== Amateur high-altitude ballooning ==
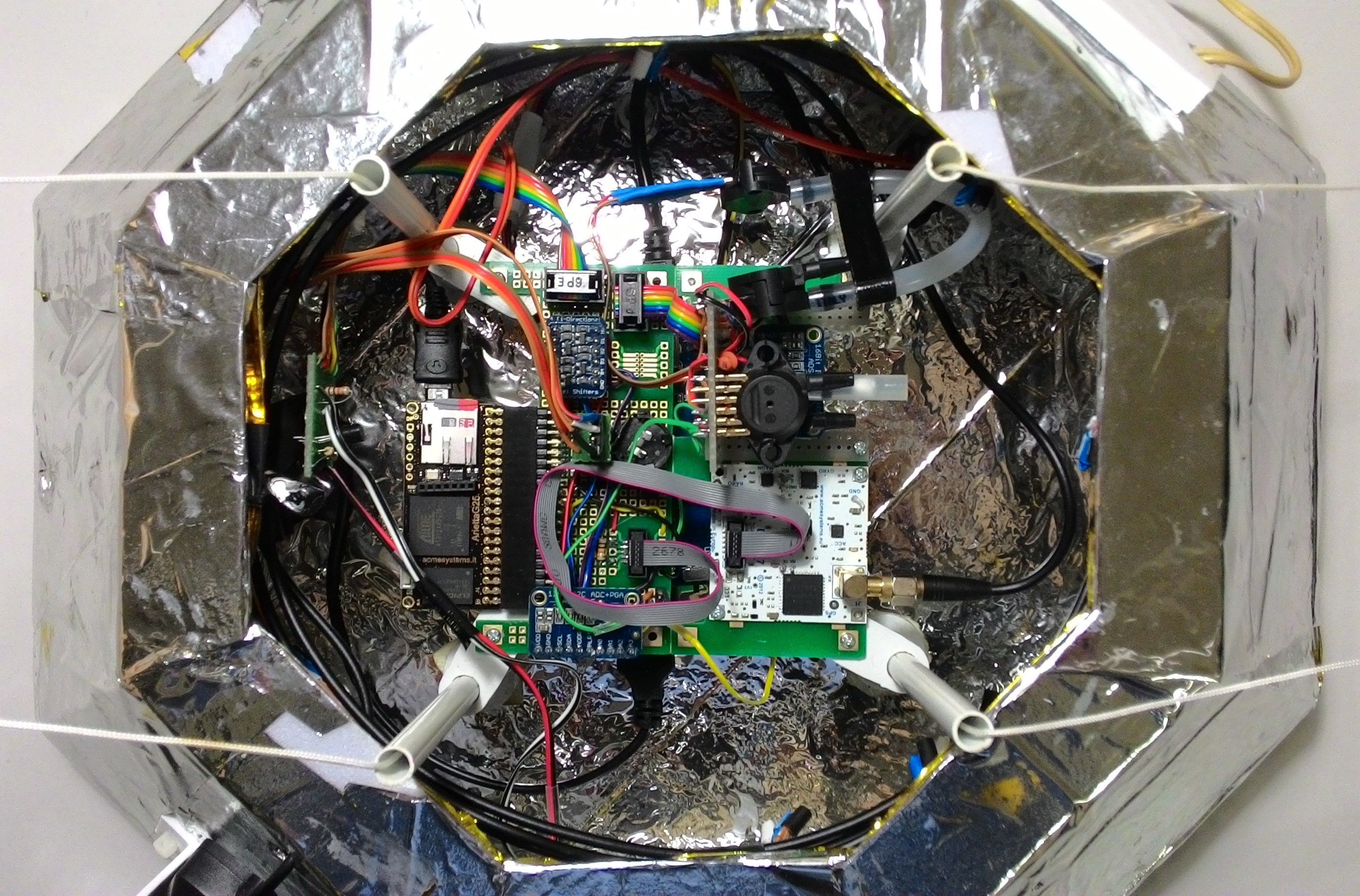
Payload of an amateur high-altitude balloon for scientific purposes. Embedded computer Arietta G25, custom pcb and different sensors (temperature, pressure, passive radiation detector). Photo taken after the flight.

In many countries, the bureaucratic overhead required for high altitude balloon launches is minimal when the payload is below a certain weight threshold, typically on the order of a few kilograms. This makes the process of launching these small HABs accessible to many students and amateur groups. Despite their smaller size, these HABs still often ascend to (and past) altitudes on the order of 30,000 m (98,000 ft), providing easy stratospheric access for scientific and educational purposes. These amateur balloon flights are often informed in their operations by the use of a path predictor. Before launch, weather forecasts containing predicted wind vectors are used to numerically propagate a simulated HAB along a trajectory, predicting where the actual balloon will travel.

=== Legality in the United States ===
In the United States, high-altitude ballooning is governed by Title 14 Part 101 in the Code of Federal Regulations; balloons are only subject to regulation if their payload package weighs more than four pounds and has a larger density than three ounces per square inch, if the payload package is larger than six pounds regardless of density, or if the payload is connected to a balloon by a rope requiring more than 50lb of force to break it. Any balloons meeting these requirements are subject to regulation, usually involving coordination with the local air traffic control facility, implementation two emergency payload cut-down systems and two emergency balloon terminating systems.

=== Amateur radio high-altitude ballooning ===
Testing radio range is often a large component of these hobbies. Amateur radio is often used with packet radio to communicate with 1200 baud, using a system called Automatic Packet Reporting System back to the ground station. Smaller packages called micro or pico trackers are also built and run under smaller balloons. These smaller trackers have used Morse code, Feld Hell, and RTTY to transmit their locations and other data.

The first recorded amateur radio high-altitude balloon launches took place in Finland by the Ilmari program on May 28, 1967, and in Germany in 1964.

==== ARHAB program ====
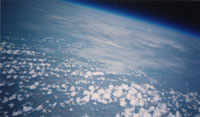
Image of the Earth's horizon taken from 26 km (16 mi) on an ARHAB flight.

Amateur radio high-altitude ballooning (ARHAB) is the application of analog and digital amateur radio to weather balloons and was the name suggested by Ralph Wallio (amateur radio callsign W0RPK) for this hobby. Often referred to as "The Poor Man's Space Program", ARHAB allows amateurs to design functioning models of spacecraft and launch them into a space-like environment. Bill Brown (amateur radio callsign WB8ELK) is considered to have begun the modern ARHAB movement with his first launch of a balloon carrying an amateur radio transmitter on 15 August 1987.

An ARHAB flight consists of a balloon, a recovery parachute, and a payload of one or more packages. The payload normally contains an amateur radio transmitter that permits tracking of the flight to its landing for recovery. Most flights use an Automatic Packet Reporting System (APRS) tracker which gets its position from a Global Positioning System (GPS) receiver and converts it to a digital radio transmission. Other flights may use an analog beacon and are tracked using radio direction finding techniques. Long duration flights frequently must use high frequency custom-built transmitters and slow data protocols such as radioteletype (RTTY), Hellschreiber, Morse code, and PSK31, to transmit data over great distances using little battery power. The use of amateur radio transmitters on an ARHAB flight requires an amateur radio license, but non-amateur radio transmitters are possible to use without a license.

In addition to the tracking equipment, other payload components may include sensors, data loggers, cameras, amateur television (ATV) transmitters or other scientific instruments. Some ARHAB flights carry a simplified payload package called BalloonSat.

A typical ARHAB flight uses a standard latex weather balloon, lasts around 2–3 hours, and reaches 25–35 km (16–22 mi) in altitude. Experiments with zero-pressure balloons, superpressure balloons, and valved latex balloons have extended flight times to more than 24 hours. A zero-pressure flight by the Spirit of Knoxville Balloon Program in March 2008 lasted over 40 hours and landed off the coast of Ireland, over 5,400 km (3,400 mi) from its launch point. On December 11, 2011, the California Near Space Project flight number CNSP-11 with the call sign K6RPT-11 launched a record-breaking flight traveling 6,236 mi (10,036 km) from San Jose, California, to a splashdown in the Mediterranean Sea. The flight lasted 57 hours and 2 minutes. It became the first successful U.S. transcontinental and the first successful transatlantic amateur radio high-altitude balloon. Since that time, a number of flights have circumnavigated the Earth using superpressure plastic film balloons.

Each year in the United States, the Great Plains Super Launch (GPSL) hosts a large gathering of ARHAB groups.

==== BEAR program ====
Balloon Experiments with Amateur Radio (BEAR) is a series of Canadian-based high-altitude balloon experiments by a group of Amateur Radio operators and experimenters from Sherwood Park and Edmonton, Alberta. The experiments started in the year 2000 and continued with BEAR-9 in 2012, reaching 36.010 km (22.376 mi). The balloons are made of latex filled with either helium or hydrogen. All of the BEAR payloads carry a tracking system comprising a GPS receiver, an APRS encoder, and a radio transmitter module. Other experimental payload modules include an Amateur Radio crossband repeater, and a digital camera, all of which is contained within an insulated foam box suspended below the balloon.

=== BalloonSat ===
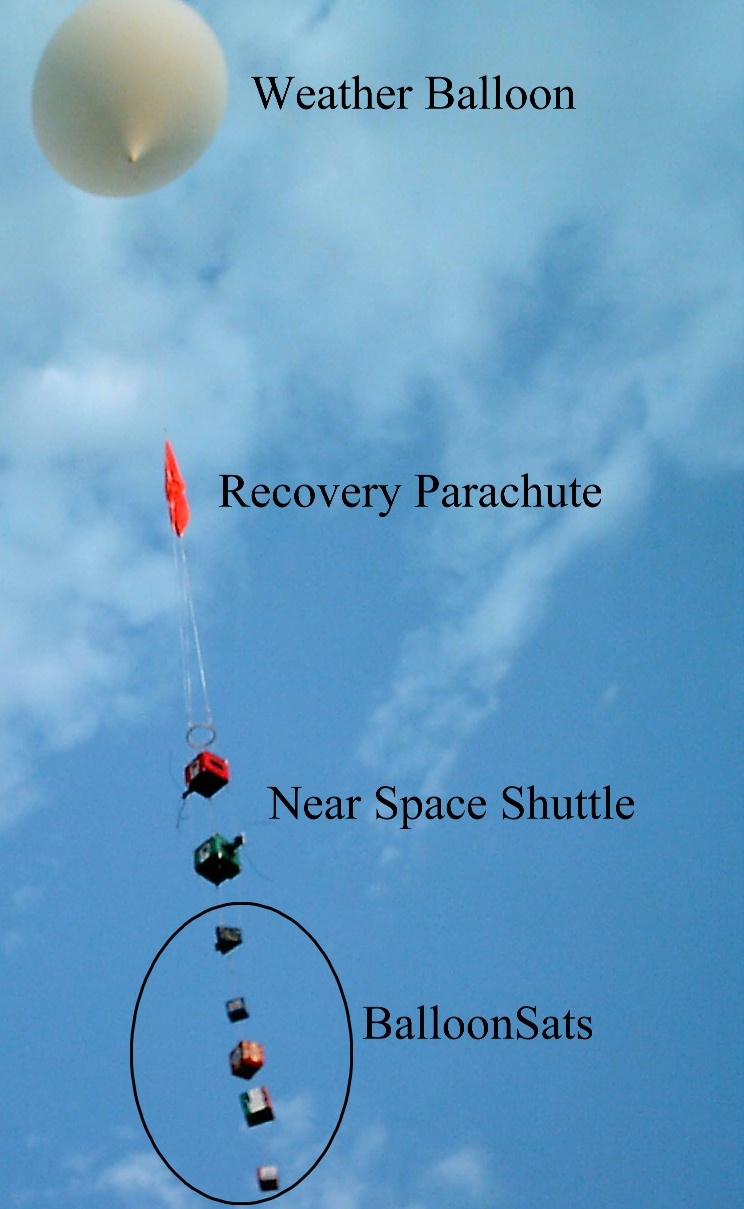
Image of five BalloonSats shortly after launch on an ARHAB flight.

A BalloonSat is a simple package designed to carry lightweight experiments into near space. They are a popular introduction to engineering principles in some high school and college courses. BalloonSats are carried as secondary payloads on ARHAB flights. One reason BalloonSats are simple is that they do not require the inclusion of tracking equipment; as secondary payloads, they already are being carried by tracking capsules.

Space Grant started the BalloonSat program in August 2000. It was created as a hands-on way to introduce new science and engineering students interested in space studies to some fundamental engineering techniques, team working skills and the basics of space and Earth science. The BalloonSat program is part of a course taught by Space Grant at the University of Colorado at Boulder.

Often the design of a BalloonSat is under weight and volume constraints. This encourages good engineering practices, introduces a challenge, and allows for the inclusion of many BalloonSats on an ARHAB flight. The airframe material is usually Styrofoam or Foamcore, as they are lightweight, easy to machine, and provide reasonably good insulation.

Most carry sensors, data loggers and small cameras operated by timer circuits. Popular sensors include air temperature, relative humidity, tilt, and acceleration. Experiments carried inside BalloonSats have included such things as captive insects and food items.

Before launch, most BalloonSats are required to undergo testing. These tests are designed to ensure the BalloonSat will function properly and return science results. The tests include a cold soak, drop test, function test, and weighing. The cold soak test simulates the intense cold temperatures the BalloonSat will experience during its mission. A launch and landing can be traumatic, therefore the drop test requires the BalloonSat to hold together and still function after an abrupt drop. The function test verifies the BalloonSat crew can prepare the BalloonSat at the launch site.

=== Variety payloads ===
Besides conducting scientific activities, schools, influencers and other individuals have launched a wide variety of novelty payloads to the stratosphere with high-altitude balloons. These have included teddy bears, LEGO figurines, hamburgers, pizza, Cornish pasties, garlic bread, bacon and cans of beer. Japanese electronics manufacturer Toshiba attempted to record an advertisement in near space with an armchair and cameras tethered to a high-altitude balloon.

== Geostationary balloon satellite ==
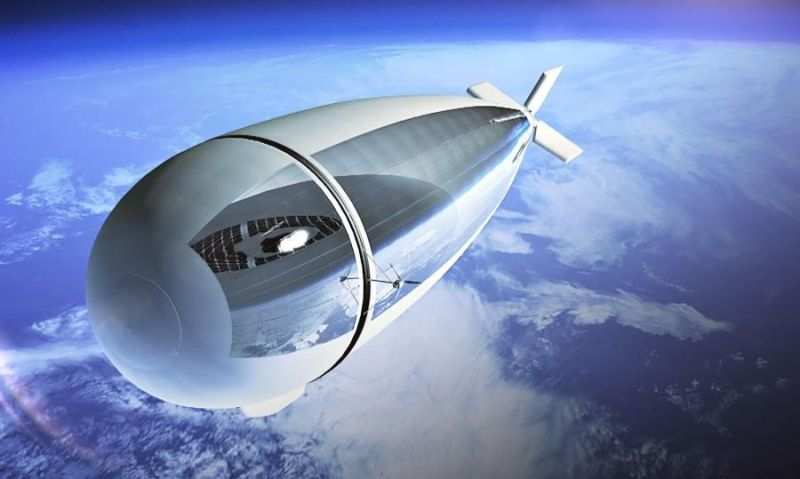
Stratobus airship

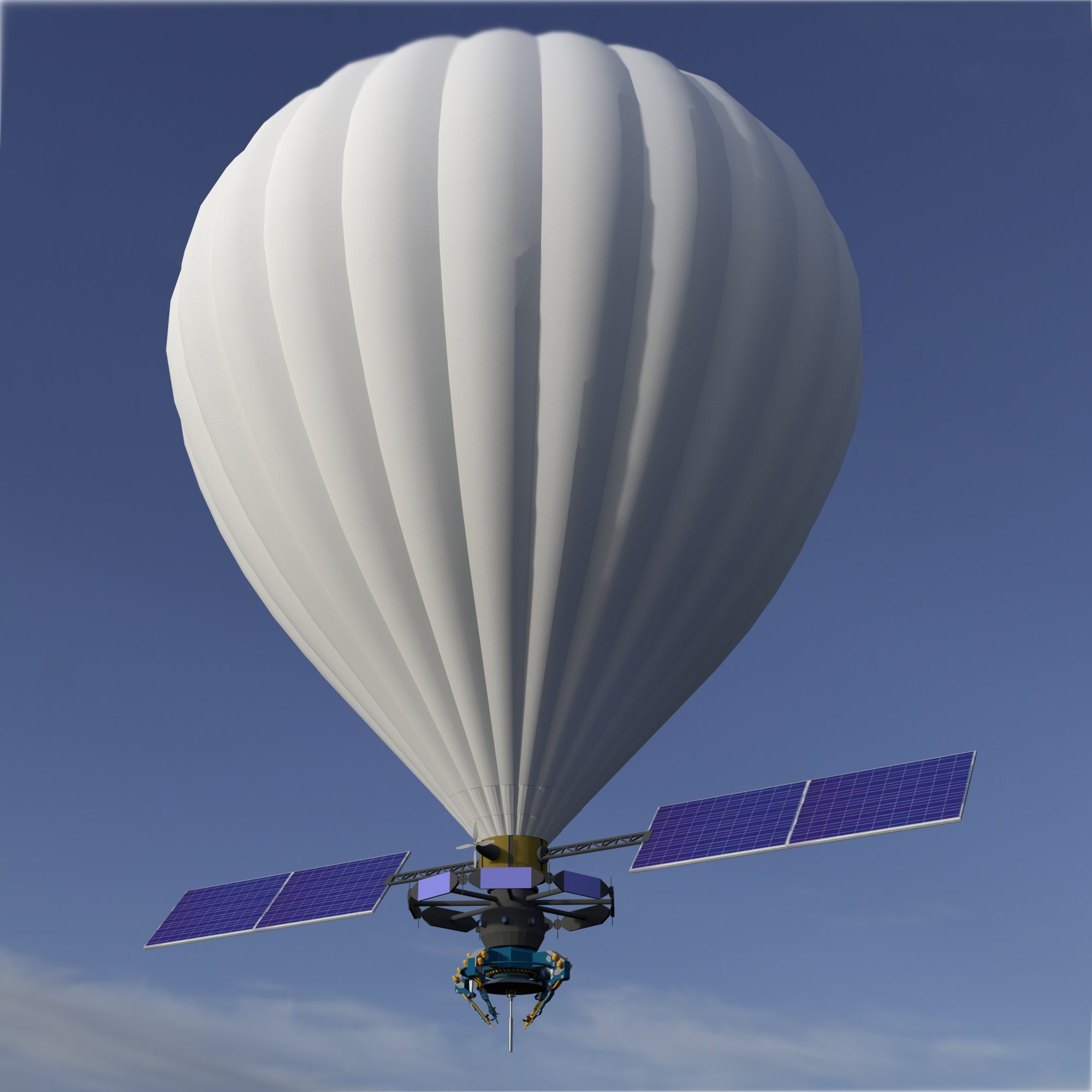
Geostationary balloon satellite

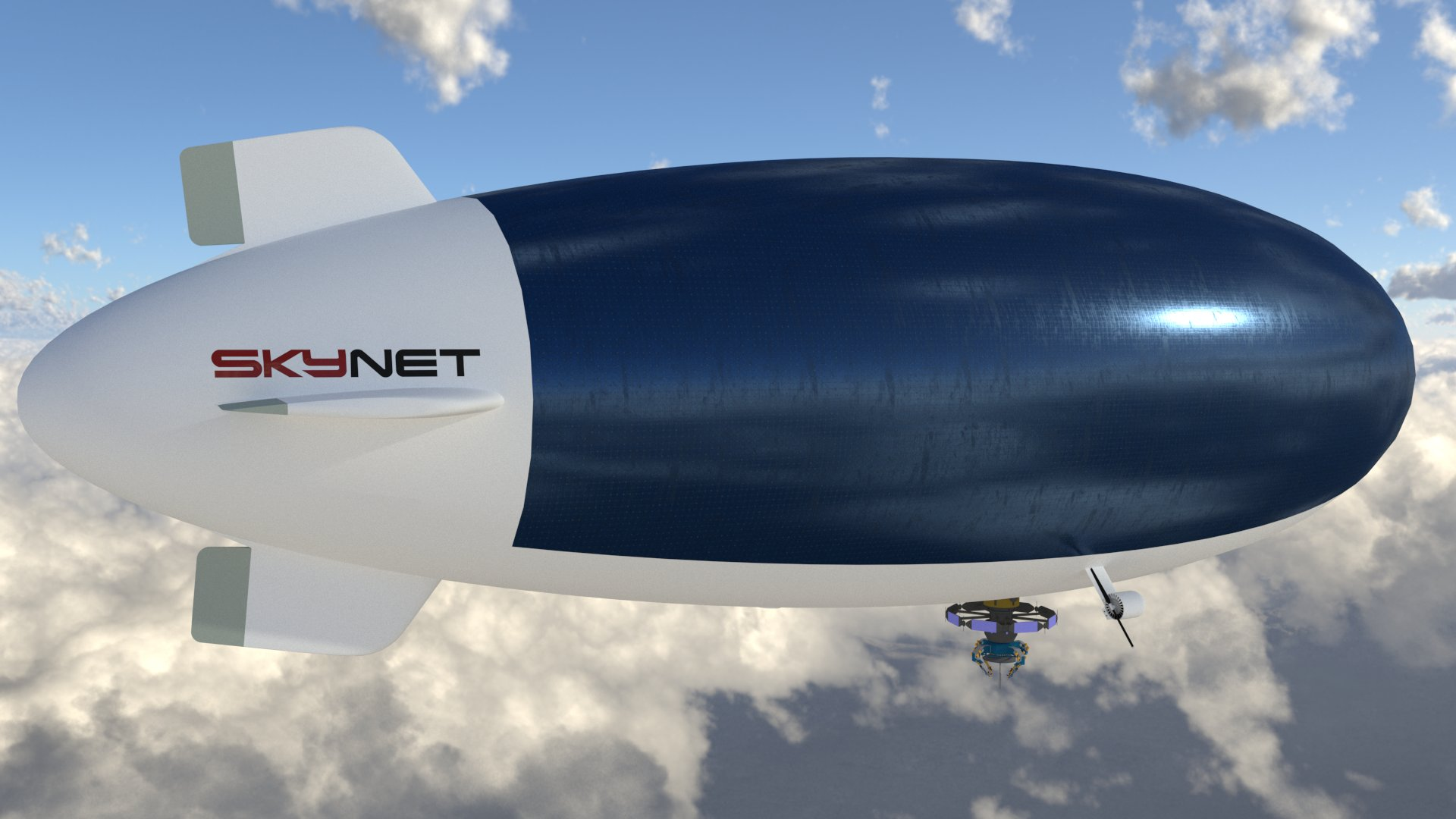
Geostationary airship satellite

Geostationary balloon satellites (GBS) are proposed high-altitude balloons that would float in the mid-stratosphere (60,000 to 70,000 feet (18 to 21 km) above sea level) at a fixed point over the Earth's surface and thereby act as an atmospheric satellite. At those altitudes, air density is around 1/15 to 1/20 of what it is at sea level. The average wind speed at these levels is less than that at the surface. A propulsion system would allow the balloon to move into and maintain its position. The GBS would be powered with solar panels.

A GBS could be used to provide broadband Internet access over a large area. Laser broadband would connect the GBS to the network, which could then provide a large area of coverage because of its wider line of sight over the curvature of the Earth and unimpeded Fresnel zone.

=== Spaceport Tucson ===
World View Enterprises built and operates the balloon spaceport in Tucson, Arizona. The spaceport is owned by Pima County, Arizona.

== See also ==
- Aerial photography
- ARCADE
- Atmospheric satellite
- BRRISON
- Columbia Scientific Balloon Facility
- Flight endurance record
- Geostationary satellite
- High-altitude platform station
- Internet.org
- Project Loon
- Tethered blimp
- World View Enterprises
- PongSat
- List of tallest structures in the United States by height
- Zero-pressure balloons
- Superpressure balloon
- StratEx Space Dive
- Red Bull Stratos
- Nuclear electromagnetic pulse
- List of high-altitude object events in 2023
