= Sky anchor =

A sky anchor is a system of two balloons in tandem, with a "zero-pressure" lifting gas balloon tethered to a superpressure balloon "anchor". The gas balloon is filled with a lifting gas and provides the buoyancy, while the superpressure balloon is filled with air, and pressurized to provide the desired ballast weight. In a passive sky anchor, the superpressure balloon is sealed, while in an active system, its pressure can be varied. Both versions have been tested in flight, but have had frequent failures with only occasional successful outcomes. The tandem arrangement makes launching difficult, and this complexity can lead to mission failure.

The tandem balloon system is intended to increase the flight time of the zero-pressure balloon by damping the diurnal altitude variations caused by solar heating of the lifting gas and its subsequent expansion. As the balloons descend, the superpressure balloon's constant volume displaces a larger mass of the denser air, and becomes more buoyant. Likewise as they rise, the system displaces less air mass, limiting the ascent to prevent the lifting gas from expanding too far and escaping from the zero pressure balloon.

The Sky Anchor system, originally developed at Texas A&M University in 1976, is usually applied to unmanned balloons, but the concept was also applied to a piloted balloon. The "Earthwinds" balloon system used a tandem balloon arrangement for a planned circumnavigation record attempt using the jet stream winds. Five attempts at the circumnavigation in the early 1990s all failed early in the flight, with the fifth abort on January 1, 1995, blamed on a failure of the lower ballast balloon.

== See also ==
- Space elevator - a cable (tether) reaching from the surface of the earth into space and held in place by the centrifugal force of a counterweight above 36 km altitude.
- Space tether/ Skyhook
