= Global horizontal sounding technique =

The global horizontal sounding technique (GHOST) program was an atmospheric field research project in the late 1960s for investigating the technical ability to gather weather data using hundreds of simultaneous long-duration balloons for very long-range global scale numerical weather prediction in preparation for the Global Atmospheric Research Program (GARP).

== Technology ==
The GHOST program was to demonstrate technology for a program that would, ultimately, gather data from thousands of balloons simultaneously. Unlike radiosonde balloons which collect vertical atmospheric sounding data over the release point during a relatively short ascent lasting a few hours, horizontal sounding balloons stay aloft for much longer periods lasting several weeks or months, floating at a constant-density altitude.

The GHOST design explored the performance a superpressure balloon with a spherical two-layer PET film envelope holding the gas inside at a higher pressure than the surrounding atmosphere, allowing it to maintain a nearly constant altitude. These gas balloons float at a constant density altitude, where the balloon displaces a mass of air equal to its own mass. Expansion of the lifting gas due to solar heating is avoided in a superpressure balloon, since the inextensible PET film allows the pressure to rise as the gas is heated, rather than allow the volume to expand. This allows them to drift with, and track, horizontal atmospheric air currents at a constant air pressure level (a constant altitude) above the Earth's surface.

The electronics payload was suspended below the balloon on a tether that also acted as a high frequency band radio antenna. The GHOST payload included a sun angle sensor that varied the repetition rate of its Morse code radio signal to allow technicians on the ground to locate it using an HF receiver and a set of sun angle tables.

The balloons could not be flown in the Northern Hemisphere because the Soviet Union would not permit overflights at the time.

== Results ==
231 GHOST balloons were launched in a four-year period between March 1966 and December 1969.

On September 29, 1968, a 10-foot (3.0-meter) GHOST balloon at an altitude of approximately 52,000 feet (16,000 meters) completed a full 365 days in flight, becoming the first balloon to fly for a full year. This record-breaking balloon, launched from Christchurch, New Zealand by the U.S. National Center for Atmospheric Research (NCAR), continued to fly for an additional 76 days, completing 35 circumnavigations of the Earth. The longest flight of the program was 744 days, or just over two years.

== Legacy ==
For the measurements of the GARP program, the demonstrated flight lifetime at low altitudes (below 12 km (7.5 mi)) proved to be too short, despite many redesigns of the balloon system to improve the performance. Without both upper level and lower level long-duration balloons, the GHOST system idea was deemed infeasible for the GARP requirements. The GHOST program was superseded by research on the carrier balloon system, also known as "Mother GHOST".

The Ghost Project based at Christchurch Airport New Zealand was still running in 1973. A GHOST project balloon was seen by a member of the public in 1985.

Vincent E. Lally of NCAR received the Otto C. Winzen Lifetime Achievement Award from the American Institute of Aeronautics and Astronautics in 2003 for his pioneering work in the application and development of superpressure balloons for worldwide atmospheric measurements, including the GHOST program. Winzen was a pioneer of modern ballooning, and this award recognizes outstanding contributions to the advancement of free-flight balloon systems or related technologies.
