= Spirit of Knoxville =

Project logo

The Spirit of Knoxville was a high-altitude balloon project run by amateur scientists and University of Tennessee students, with the ultimate goal of successfully sending an unmanned balloon with radio telemetry across the Atlantic Ocean. The project name was inspired by Charles Lindbergh's record-breaking Spirit of St. Louis aircraft. As of November 2008, five flights were made, of which three were intended to cross the Atlantic, a goal later achieved in 2011 by the California Near Space Project.

== History ==
The project began in 2005, under the direction of students from the Amateur Radio Club at The University of Tennessee, with a series of technology demonstrator flights dubbed the "Icarus" series. These flights tested small zero-pressure balloon designs, ballast dumping mechanisms and material, custom radio circuitry, the Distributed Tracking and Relay volunteer listening network, and command uplinking.

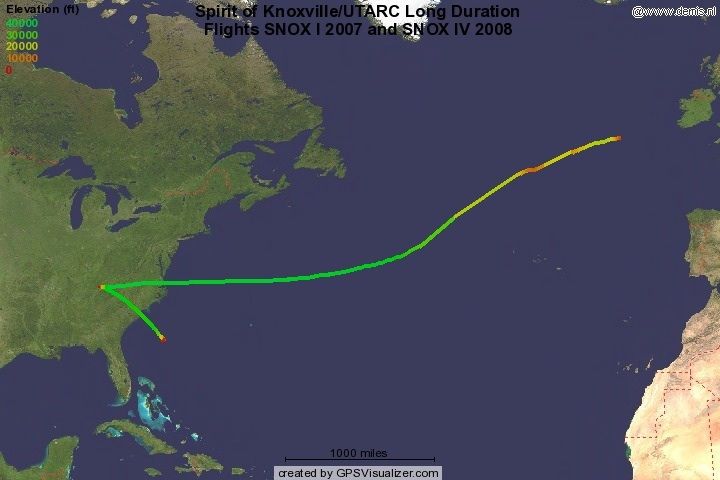
Map of Spirit of Knoxville Flights I and IV

The first Spirit of Knoxville "SNOX" designated flight was SNOX I, reaching a stable float altitude of approximately 11 kilometres (36,000 feet). Launched from Knoxville Downtown Island Airport, in December 2007, the balloon travelled over 900 kilometers southeast to land just north of the Bahamas, fulfilling the objectives of the new balloon envelope. The flight ended, however, due to the ballast system's inability to drop weight fast enough at nightfall after the loss of daytime solar heating.

The hardware and software of the ballast system were redesigned for the test flight SNOX II, to ensure a faster response to solar heat loss at sunset. SNOX II launched in January 2008, but landed in minutes just a few kilometers away in an urban home backyard. Post-flight recovery and analysis revealed that newly tested inflation procedures had caused a rip in the top of the balloon. The payload and ballast system were not damaged; however, the balloon envelope was damaged beyond repair during landing.

SNOX III was assembled shortly with a new balloon envelope and the same payload and ballast system from SNOX II. Launched in January 2008, it was the first official attempt to cross the Atlantic Ocean. The onboard GPS failed shortly after launch, eliminating the ability for the balloon to report its position, and also preventing the ballast system from detecting changes in altitude. Crude radio direction finding attempts by volunteers did indicate the balloon followed its predicted trajectory as far as the shore of the Atlantic Ocean in Virginia.

SNOX IV was the most successful flight to date, launched on March 11, 2008, It remained in the air for over 40 hours and 5,600 kilometers (3,500 mi), surpassing all flight duration and distance records for amateur balloons. The ballast system used all available weight on the first night, and the balloon system succumbed to the loss of solar heat on the second sunset of its flight. The landing was just a few hundred kilometers from Ireland.

The most recent flight was SNOX V, launched April 5, 2008. It suffered a failure of the envelope itself, landing in southwestern Virginia approximately 8 hours after launch.

== Overview ==
The project used custom-built zero-pressure balloons from Global Western, made of very thin polyethylene, with denatured alcohol ballast dropped during cruise to maintain a constant altitude (although lift provided by solar heating is also used). The electronics consisted of a flight computer, I2C temperature sensors, high frequency radio transmitter, electric heater, 40 AA lithium batteries, and GPS.

Amateur radio operators voluntarily assisted in tracking the balloons during their flights.

In order to cross the ocean, the balloon needed to stay within the high speed jet stream winds the entire way from Knoxville, Tennessee, to Europe or Africa. These continuous winds rarely travel directly over the southeastern United States, which restricted the number of times per year this crossing could be attempted.
