= Global Atmospheric Research Program =

Combined atmospheric research program

The Global Atmospheric Research Program (GARP) was a fifteen-year international research programme led by the World Meteorological Organization and the International Council of Scientific Unions. It began in 1967 and organised several important field experiments including GARP Atlantic Tropical Experiment in 1974 and the Alpine Experiment (ALPEX) in 1982. Its field experiments helped make significant progress in meteorology in particular allowing major improvements in Numerical Weather Prediction.

== GATE Timeline ==
1966-1969: Global horizontal sounding technique (GHOST) program demonstrates feasibility of long-lived balloons as a precursor to the Global Atmospheric Research Program
1972: "Experiment Design Proposal," Kuetner, Rider, Sitnikov approved by the Joint Organizing Committee for GARP (JOC) and the Tropical Experiment Board (TEB)
15 June 1974: Experiment Began
17 June - 25 June: In port, stand-down, en route, intercomparisons
26 June - 16 July: Observation Phase I
17 July - 27 July: In port, stand-down, en route, intercomparisons
28 July - 17 August: Observation Phase II
18 August - 29 August: in port, stand down, en route, intercomparisons
30 August - 19 September: Observation Phase III
20 September - 23 September: En route, intercomparisons
