= Super-pressure balloon =

Balloon with a relative constant pressure used for scientific research

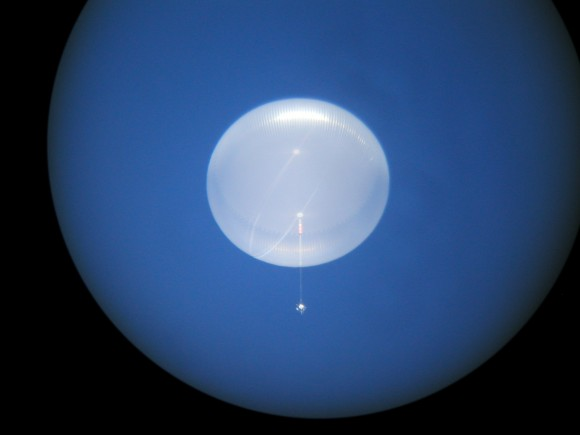
A super pressure balloon in flight

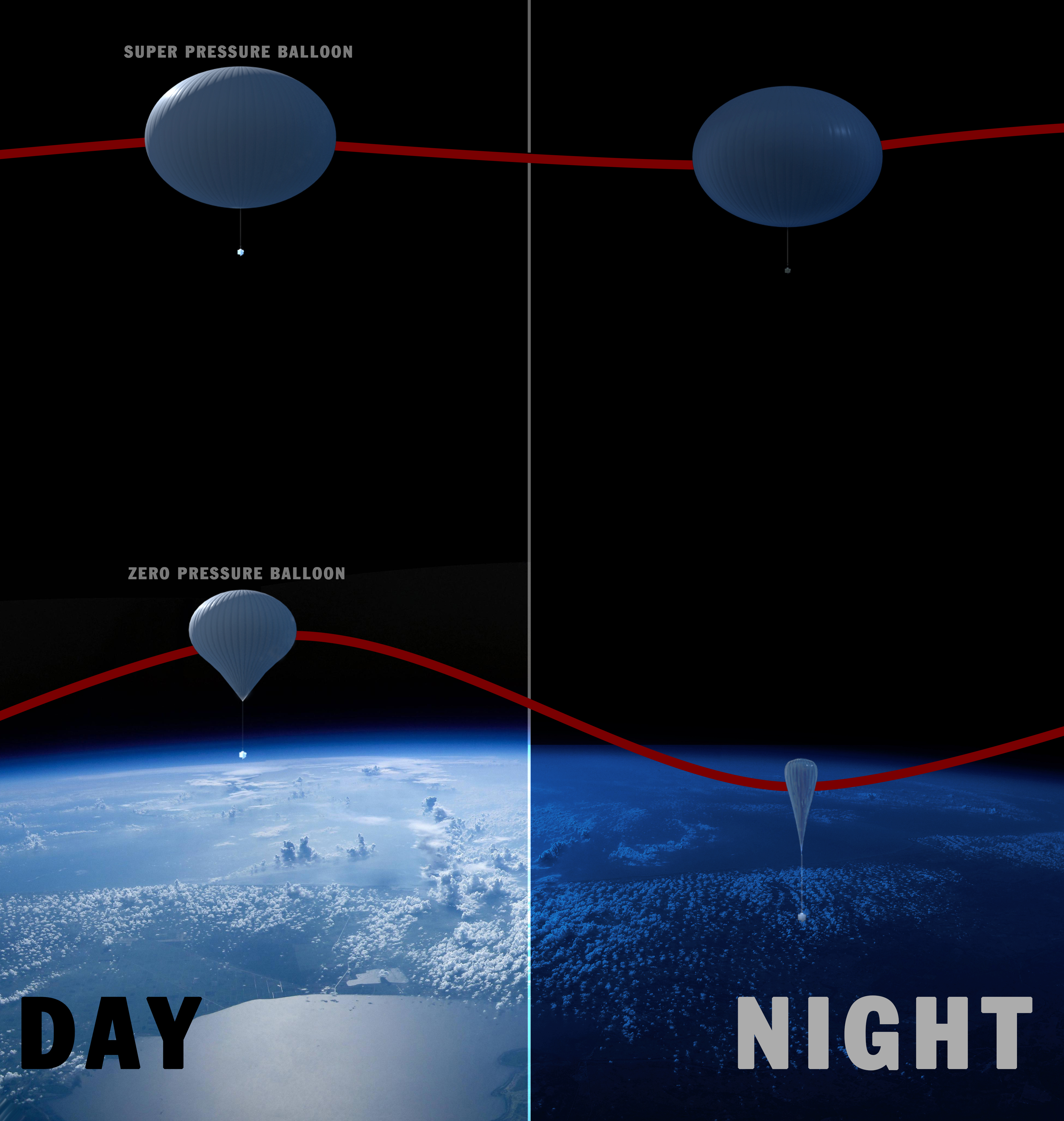
Two types of high-altitude balloons, a zero- and super-pressure

A super-pressure balloon (SPB) is a style of aerostatic balloon where the volume of the balloon is kept relatively constant in the face of changes in ambient pressure outside the balloon, and the temperature of the contained lifting gas. This allows the balloon to keep a stable altitude for long periods. This is in contrast with much more common variable-volume balloons, which are either only partially filled with lifting gas, or made with more elastic materials. Also referred to as pumpkin or ultra long distance balloons (ULDB) balloons, the sealed balloon envelopes have a pumpkin shape at flight altitude.

== Operation ==
In a variable-volume balloon, the volume of the lifting gas changes due to heating and cooling in the diurnal cycle. The cycle is magnified by a greenhouse effect inside the balloon, while the surrounding atmospheric gas is subject to a much more limited cyclical temperature change. As the lift gas heats and expands, the displacement of atmospheric gas increases, while the balloon weight remains constant. Its buoyancy increases, and this leads to a rise in altitude unless it is compensated by venting gas. Conversely, if the balloon cools and drops, it becomes necessary to release ballast. Since both ballast and gas are finite, there is a limit to how long a variable-volume balloon can compensate in order to stabilize its altitude.

In contrast, a superpressure balloon experiences smaller changes in altitude without compensation maneuvers. Because the volume of the balloon is more constrained, so is the volume of air displaced by it. In accordance with the Principle of Archimedes, the upward force on the balloon is equal to the weight of the displaced ambient gas. In this case the ambient gas is the atmospheric gas displaced by the balloon. The weight of the displaced atmospheric gas decreases as the balloon rises, because atmospheric density diminishes with increasing altitude. So the force pushing the balloon upward diminishes with altitude and at some particular altitude, the upward force equals the weight of the balloon. As a result, the balloon remains stable in a finite equilibrium altitude range for long periods.

The disadvantage is that such balloons require much stronger materials than non-pressurized types.

== Applications ==
Superpressure balloons (SPB) are typically used for extremely long duration flights of unmanned scientific experiments in the upper atmosphere, where atmospheric gas temperature is quite stable through the diurnal cycle. In 1985, such balloons were used for aerobots flying at an altitude of approximately 50 kilometres (160,000 ft) in the atmosphere of Venus, in the international, Soviet-led Vega program.

In February 1974, Colonel Thomas L. Gatch Jr, USAR attempted to make the first crossing of the Atlantic by balloon in a superpressure balloon named Light Heart. Following the loss of at least two of the ten balloons which provided lift, and after deviating substantially from the course that Colonel Gatch had plotted to take advantage of the jet stream, the last reported sighting of the Light Heart was 1,610 kilometres (1,000 mi) west of the Canary Islands; no further trace of the aircraft was ever found.

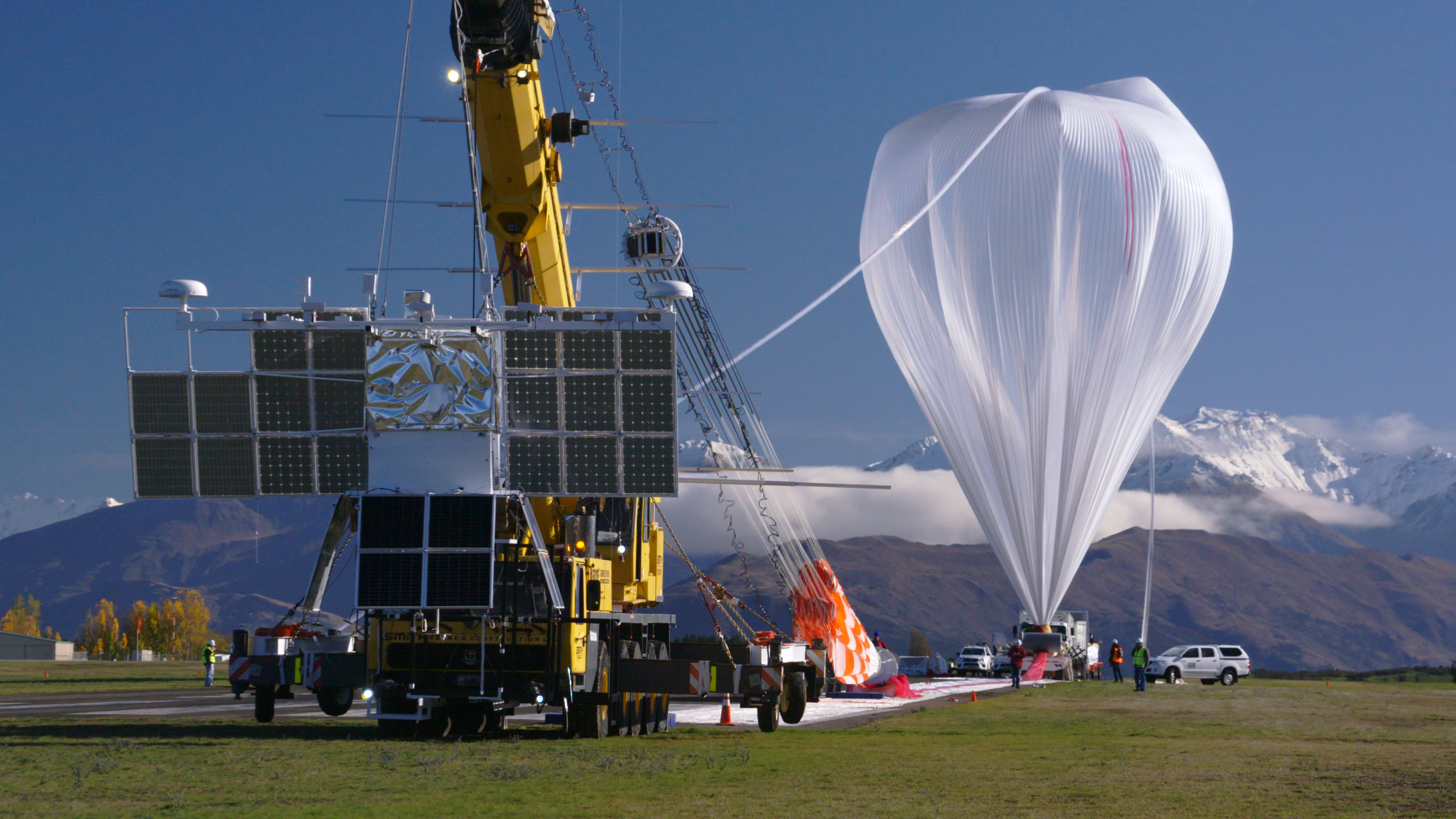
NASA Super Pressure Balloon Wānaka Airport, New Zealand

In March 2015, NASA launched a SPB to an altitude of 110,000 feet (34,000 m) for 32 days from New Zealand and landed it in Australia after a leak was detected. This was the first time a SPB was flown for a long duration through the day and night cycle. When fully inflated, it was the size of a football stadium.

Alphabet Inc.'s Project Loon used controllable altitude superpressure balloons to achieve flights of over 300 days.

The SPB TRAVALB-2 surpassed previous Antarctic balloon flights by staying aloft for 149 Days, 3 hours, and 58 minutes after launch from the NASA Long Duration Balloon (LDB) site at LDB Camp, McMurdo Station, Antarctica. The operation was supported by National Science Foundation and United States Antarctic Program. After the Travalb-1 launch abort, the Travalb-2 lifted off on 29 December 2019 to test NASA balloon trajectory predictions in Antarctica and to study electron losses from Earth's radiation belts.

The Super-pressure Balloon-borne Imaging Telescope (SuperBIT) is staged for a 30+ day flight from on NASA's SPB system in March 2022. Launched from Wānaka, New Zealand, SuperBIT intends to take advantage of day and night cycles made possible by SPB in order to obtain space-quality, diffraction-limited imaging from the stratosphere.

The Chinese high-altitude balloon that was observed transiting the United States in early 2023 was a superpressure balloon similar in style to the earlier NASA balloons.

== See also ==
- Columbia Scientific Balloon Facility
- Global horizontal sounding technique
- Sky anchor
