= Zero-pressure balloon =

Balloon with an unsealed base, used for several different applications

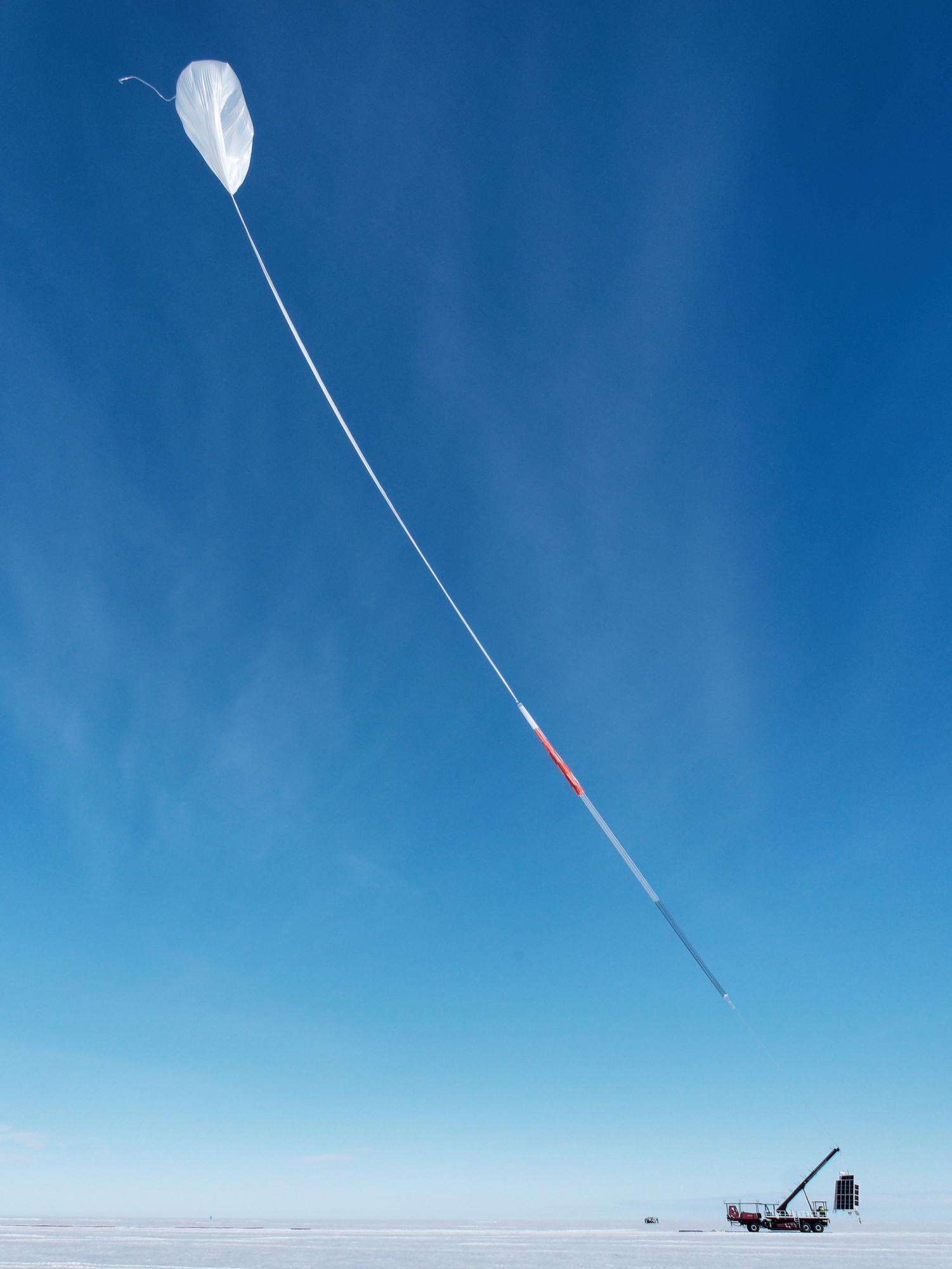
GUSTO zero-pressure balloon at launch in Antarctica.

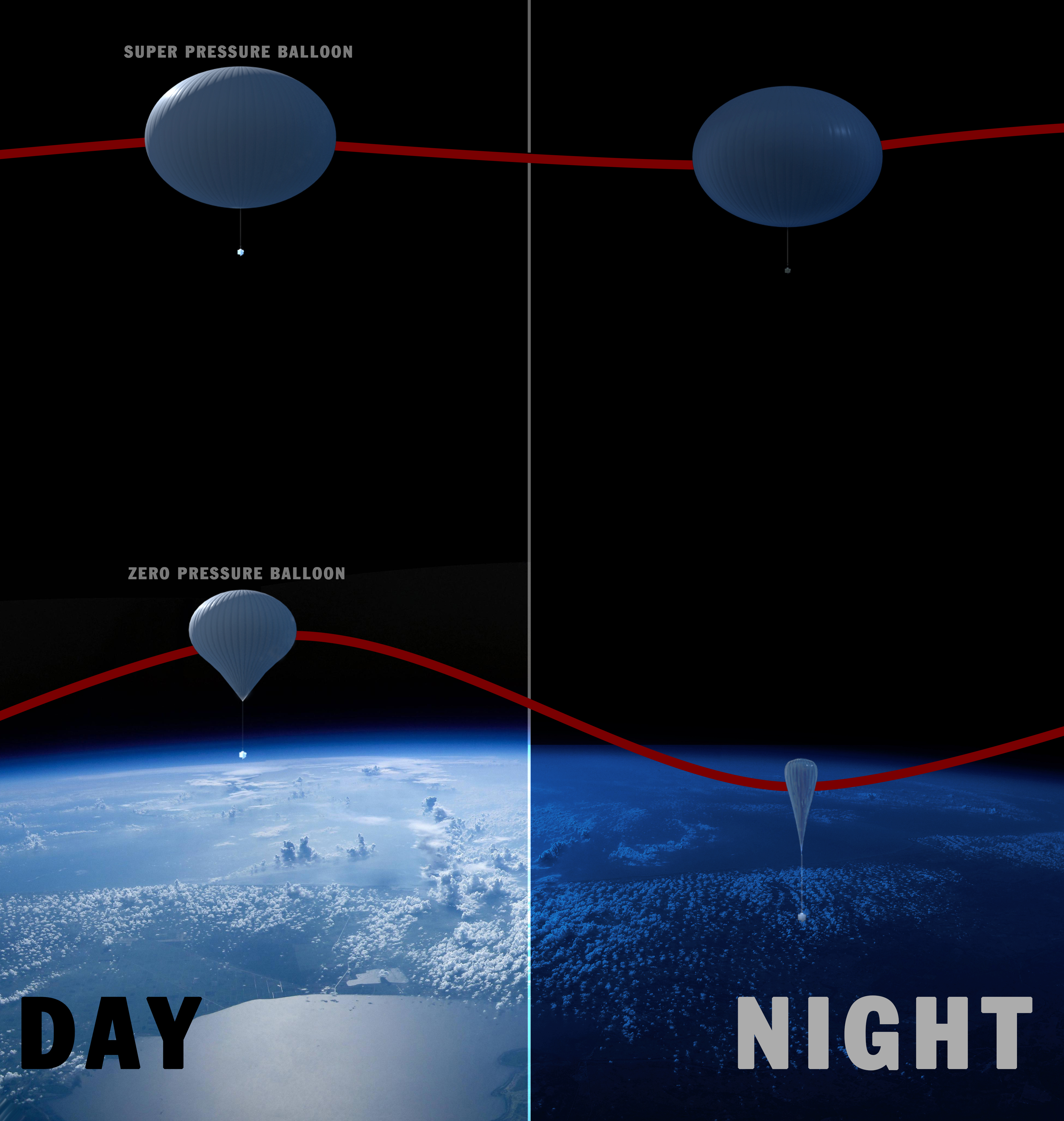
Two types of high-altitude balloons, a zero- and super-pressure

A zero-pressure balloon (ZP) is a style of aerostatic balloon that is unsealed at its base, creating a mechanism by which lifting gas can vent out the bottom of the balloon when the balloon becomes full, allowing the balloon to float at stable altitudes. During the day the gas heats up in the sun, and at night the gas cools, causing it to descend. This limits the flight time of this type of balloon.

The Columbia Scientific Balloon Facility has flown more than 1,700 scientific balloons over 40 years and currently launches between 10 and 15 flights of this type of balloon per year.

== Operation ==
Zero-pressure balloons are filled with a lighter-than-air lift gas at a launch site, where they are held to the ground during the launch process. Because lift gas expands as a balloon ascends, they are always smaller at launch than they are at higher altitudes.

When the balloon is released, it starts to rise, and the lift gas within it expands, causing the envelope to get larger. Zero-pressure balloons are equipped with ducts to help release excess gas and manage internal pressure as the balloon ascends. The ducts allow excess gas to escape when the balloon gets full during ascent. As the balloon approaches the altitude at which it will float, it will continue to vent the lift gas that is causing it to rise. The more lift gas the balloon expels, the less free lifting force exists, and the slower the balloon will ascend, until eventually, it stops ascending and starts to "float", or remain at an altitude in the sky, going neither up nor down.

Zero-pressure balloons can be designed with a natural balloon shape or near-natural shape, meaning there is no circumferential stress on the balloon envelope. This design form allows the balloon shape to be both maximally efficient (meaning the least amount of balloon film possible is used for a given volume) while still being unpressurized. The natural balloon shape typically roughly resembles an ellipsoid atop a cone.

== See also ==
- Columbia Scientific Balloon Facility
- Aerostar
- Red Bull Stratos
- StratEx Space Dive
- Project Excelsior
- Joseph Kittinger
- Project Manhigh
- Tata Institute of Fundamental Research
- Nick Piantanida
- Sophie Blanchard
- Jean-Pierre Blanchard
