= Columbia Scientific Balloon Facility =

NASA facility specialized in high altitude balloon equipment

Coordinates: 31°46′43″N 95°42′52″W

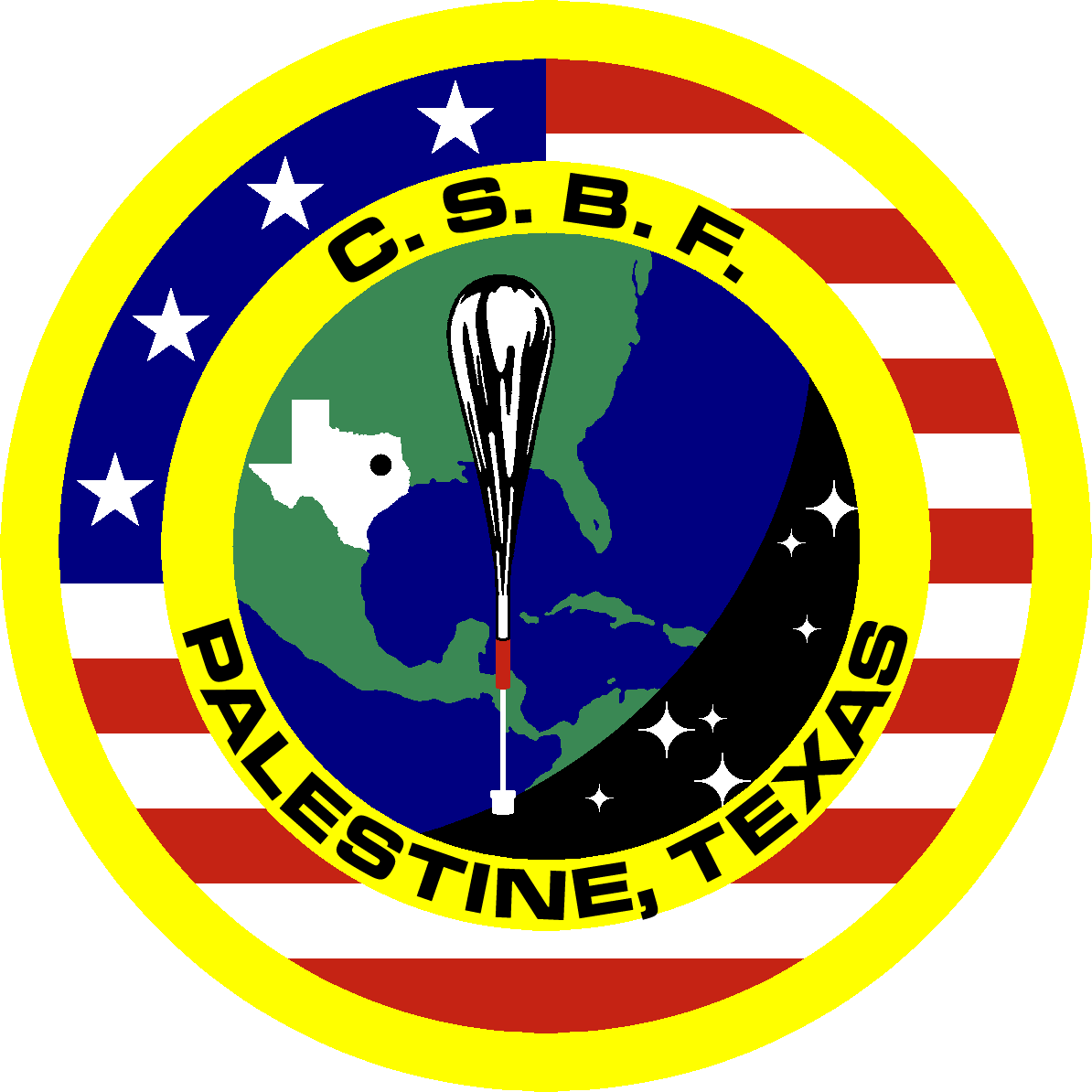

The Columbia Scientific Balloon Facility (CSBF), established in 1961 and formerly known as the National Scientific Balloon Facility (NSBF), is a NASA facility responsible for providing launch, tracking and control, airspace coordination, telemetry and command systems, and recovery services for unmanned high-altitude balloons. Customers of the CSBF include NASA centers, universities, and scientific groups from all over the world.

== Mission ==
CSBF has a threefold mission:

- Provide maintenance, operations and logistics support for NASA's scientific balloon program and facilities.
- Provide sophisticated ground and flight systems for launch, control, data retrieval, commanding, and recovery of NASA's balloon missions.
- Perform research and development to advance the capabilities of NASA's suborbital programs.

== History ==
The Balloon Facility was established by Vincent E. Lally at NCAR in Boulder, Colorado in 1961 under the auspices of the National Science Foundation. It was moved to Palestine, Texas in 1963 and designated as the National Scientific Balloon Facility (NSBF) in January 1973.

In 1982, sponsorship of the NSBF was transferred from the National Science Foundation to the National Aeronautics and Space Administration (NASA) and the NSBF became a separate entity under the University Corporation for Atmospheric Research (UCAR).

From October 1987 to January 2015, the CSBF was operated by the Physical Science Laboratory under the auspices of New Mexico State University located in Las Cruces, New Mexico. In February 2015, operation of the facility was transferred to the Technical Services Division of Orbital ATK. It is administered by Goddard Space Flight Center's Wallops Flight Facility Balloon Program Office.

Its Texas location put the NSBF in the middle of the area where the debris from the Space Shuttle Columbia dropped to Earth on February 1, 2003. In February 2006, the NSBF was renamed the Columbia Scientific Balloon Facility in honor of the Crew of STS-107.

== Ballooning ==
=== Balloon ===
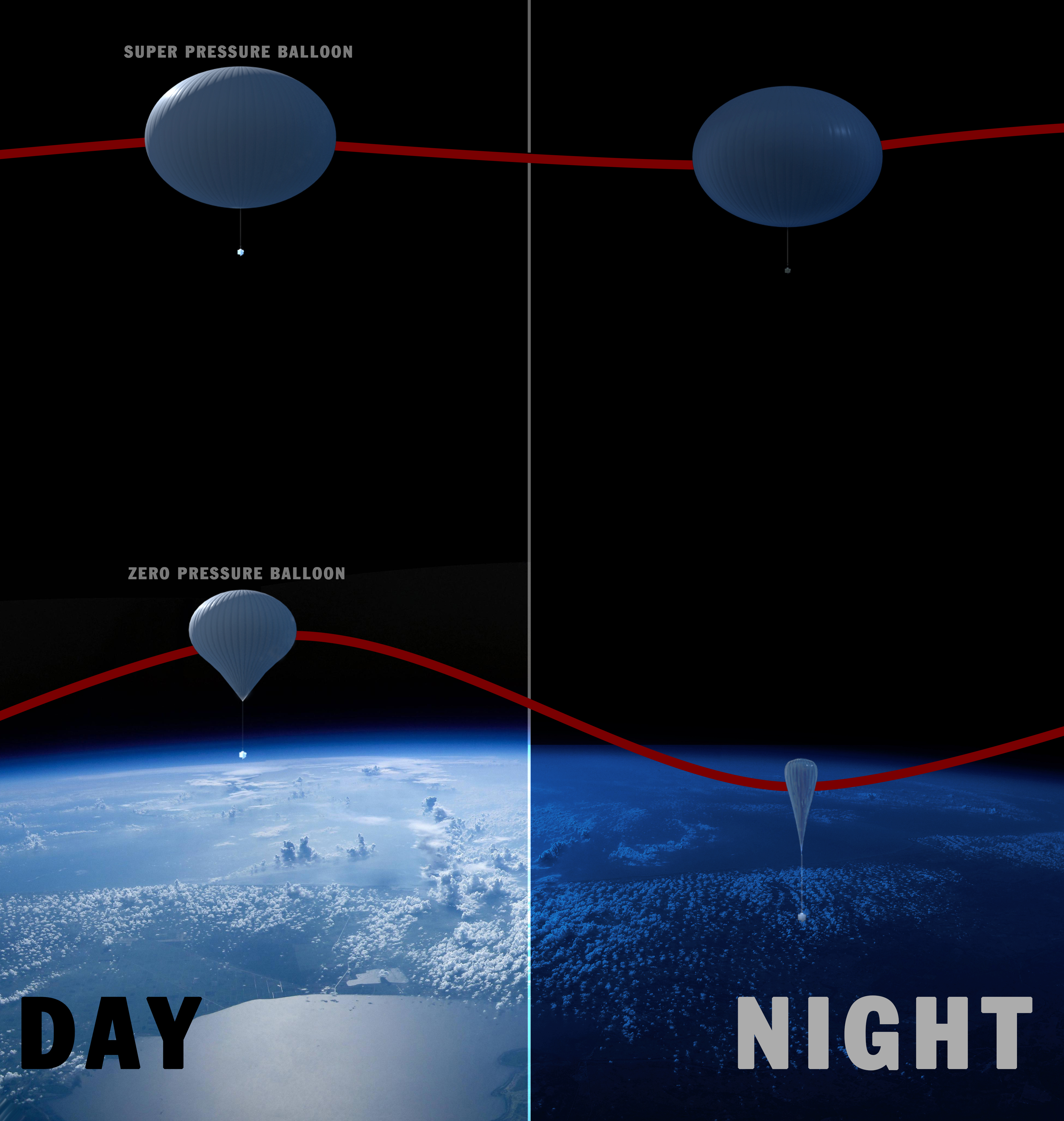
Comparison super-pressure and zero-pressure balloons

CSBF conventional and long duration (LDB) balloons are made of 20 micrometer thick polyethylene film, and at float have a diameter of up to 140 meters (460 feet) and a volume of up to 1.12 million m^{3} (40 million ft^{3}). The balloons are filled with helium gas, can carry payloads up to 3,600 kilograms (7,900 pounds), fly at altitudes of up to 42 kilometers (26 miles), and can remain at float in excess of 40 days.

The balloons are zero pressure difference balloons, and are vented at the bottom. They are only partially inflated when launched, and as they rise up, the lower atmospheric pressure causes them to fully inflate.

The bottom of the balloon is attached to a parachute, which is then attached by steel suspension cables to the payload. A flight is terminated by firing an explosive squib which separates the parachute from the balloon. A rip line simultaneously tears open the top of the balloon. The balloon quickly deflates and falls to the ground, to be retrieved and disposed of (balloons are single use). The payload descends, suspended by the parachute, and is recovered by the ground crew.

Conventional payloads typically have a float duration at altitude of 72+ hours. Long Duration Ballooning payloads float at durations of 42+ days. Ultra long duration balloons (ULDB) are being developed which can operate at float for +100 days. The limiting factor is the diurnal cycle of the sun, rising and setting. Heat during the day causes the balloon to expand and gain altitude, thereby losing helium. Heat loss at night causes the balloon to sink and contract. Ballast is carried to overcome the effect. Flying in a polar region during full sunlight allows more negligible altitude variations.

ULDB balloons or superpressure balloons (SPB) are sealed to prevent helium loss and have a pumpkin shape at flight altitude. The SPB TRAVALB-2 surpassed previous Antarctic balloon flights by staying aloft for 149 days, 3 hours, and 58 minutes after launch from the NASA Long Duration Balloon (LDB) site at LDB Camp, McMurdo Station, Antarctica. The operation was supported by National Science Foundation and United States Antarctic Program. After the Travalb-1 launch abort, the Travalb-2 lifted off on 29 December 2019 to test NASA balloon trajectory predictions in Antarctica and to study electron losses from Earth's radiation belts.

=== Preparation, launch, and flight ===
A balloon flight involves both the CSBF and a scientific team(s). The CSBF determines the launch site based on scientific goals, and provides local preparation facilities, a balloon(s), launch and recovery vehicles, and personnel to support the logistical aspects of pre flight, flight, and post flight activities. Scientific teams ship a payload to the launch site, and set up a small field station to assemble their equipment, make last-minute preparations, and manage the experiment during flight. The payload is typically a large instrument or cluster of instruments, plus onboard computers, radio telemetry equipment, and ballast.

Launching a balloon requires the conjunction of light low-level winds (to comply with the limitations of the CSBF dynamic launch technique) and suitable upper-level winds (so the balloon remains within telemetry range of a ground station, and within the permitted flight region). The payload may be rolled out to the launch area several times before surface and upper atmosphere conditions are acceptable for launch.

During the flight, data is transmitted to the ground for quick-look analysis, and is usually recorded on board as well. Scientists on the ground usually actively control the payload. An astronomical telescope, for example, can be real time directed toward a variety of sources for observations, or left in an autonomous mode of operation.

=== Launch sites ===
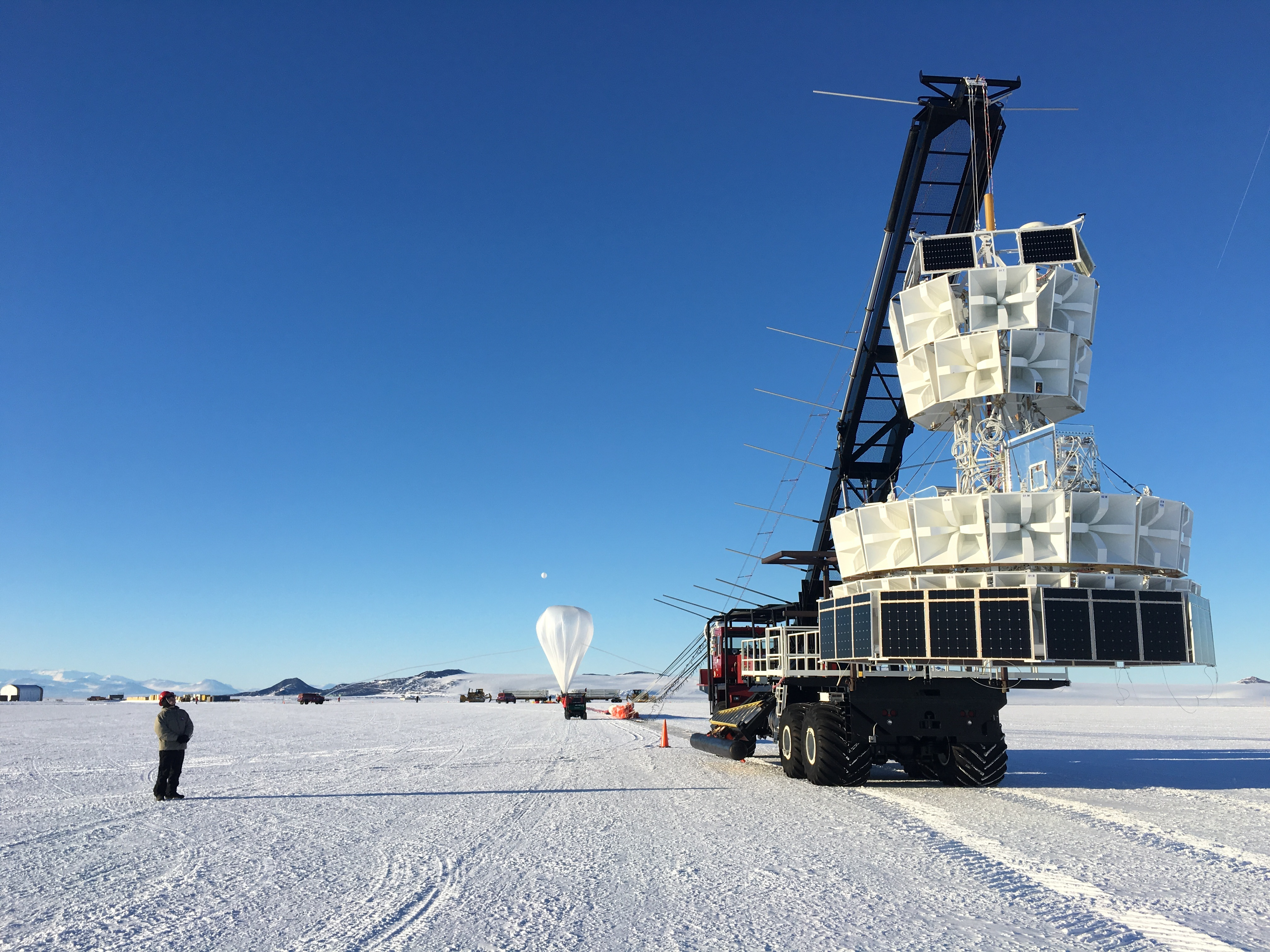
Launching balloons near McMurdo, 2016. The payload on the crane is Antarctic Impulsive Transient Antenna (ANITA)

CSBF launches balloons from several sites in the world, depending on the needs of the experiment they carry. Sites include:

- Palestine, Texas
- Fort Sumner, New Mexico
- McMurdo Station, Antarctica
- Alice Springs, Australia
- Esrange, Sweden
- Fairbanks, Alaska
- Lynn Lake, Manitoba
- Wānaka, New Zealand

== Backup Control Center ==
Since 2017, CSBF has been designated as the Backup Control Center (BCC) for the International Space Station's Mission Control Center (MCC) in Houston, TX. Approximately 3 hours from Houston, CSBF provides facilities that NASA can utilize for short-term control of the ISS in case MCC is evacuated. The BCC was temporarily activated in August 2020 while the Johnson Space Center prepared for Hurricane Laura.

== See also ==
- Superpressure balloon
