= Hypobaric decompression =

Reduction in pressure to lower than normal sea level atmospheric pressure

Hypobaric decompression is the reduction in ambient pressure below the normal range of sea level atmospheric pressure. Altitude decompression is hypobaric decompression which is the natural consequence of unprotected elevation to altitude, while other forms of hypobaric decompression are due to intentional or unintentional release of pressurization of a pressure suit or pressurized compartment, vehicle or habitat, and may be controlled or uncontrolled, or the reduction of pressure in a hypobaric chamber.

Altitude decompression may occur as a decompression from saturation at a lower altitude, or as decompression from an excursion to a lower altitude, in the case of people living at high altitude, making a short duration trip to low altitude, and returning, or a person decompressing from a dive at altitude, which is a special case of diving decompression.

Decompression has physical effects on gas filled spaces and on liquids, particularly when they contain dissolved gases. Physiological effects of decompression are due to these physical effects and the consequential effects on the living tissues, mostly as a result of the formation and growth of bubbles, the expansion of gas filled spaces, and adverse reactions in the injured tissues. Formation and growth of bubbles due to reduced pressure can be due to reduction in solubility of dissolved gases as described by Henry's Law, with nucleation and growth of bubbles in supersaturated liquids, or due to boiling of liquids when the pressure is reduced below the vapour pressure for the temperature of the liquid.

Both rate of decompression and pressure difference affect the type of injury likely and the severity of the consequences. Barotrauma is more likely to occur for rapid decompression, while decompression sickness is more likely with a large pressure drop, but both can occur simultaneously. Hypoxia risk depends mainly on the oxygen partial pressure after decompression.

== Physiological effects ==
There are three principal physiological effects arising from decompression at altitude: decompression sickness due to bubble formation in the tissues similar to those caused by decompression after exposure to pressures higher than sea level atmospheric pressure, barotrauma caused by the over-expansion of gas-filled spaces, and altitude sickness, a manifestation of hypoxia due to the naturally low partial pressure of oxygen in the air at altitude. At higher altitudes, more severe, and potentially fatal hypoxia will occur. Decompression sickness and barotrauma are considered aspects of decompression illness.

=== Decompression sickness ===
Abrupt excursions from sea level to altitudes above 15,000 feet (4,600 m) without oxygen prebreathing may induce venous gas bubbles, with a 5% probability of symptoms developing at about 21,200 feet (6,500 m), at which altitude there is over 50% probability of venous bubbles. By 22,500 feet (6,900 m) the incidence of venous bubbles exceeds 70%, with a 55% incidence of DCS. These effects may be prevented or delayed by more gradual decompression or by flushing some of the nitrogen from the tissues before decompression by prebreathing a high percentage of oxygen before and during decompression.

Altitude decompression sickness often resolves on return to the saturation altitude, but sometimes treatment on elevated concentrations of oxygen is indicated, usually 100% at surface pressure. In more severe cases hyperbaric oxygen treatment may be indicated. There is little evidence of altitude decompression sickness occurring among healthy individuals at altitudes below 18,000 feet (5,500 m), but it can occur at lower altitudes in underwater divers with sufficient residual inert gas tissue loading after recent diver.

=== Barotrauma ===
Barotrauma is physical damage to body tissues caused by a difference in pressure between a gas space inside, or in contact with, the body, and the surrounding gas or liquid. The initial damage is usually due to over-stretching the tissues in tension or shear, either directly by expansion of the gas in the closed space or by pressure difference hydrostatically transmitted through the tissue. Tissue rupture may be complicated by the introduction of gas into the local tissue or circulation through the initial trauma site, which can cause blockage of circulation at distant sites or interfere with normal function of an organ by its presence.

Decompression may be intentional or uncontrolled. Intentional decompression includes controlled unpressurised ascent to altitude. Uncontrolled decompression is an unplanned drop in the pressure of a sealed system, such as an aircraft cabin or hyperbaric chamber, and typically results from human error, material fatigue, engineering failure, or impact, causing a pressure vessel to vent into its lower-pressure surroundings or fail to pressurize at all.

Such decompression may be classed as explosive, rapid, or slow:

- Explosive decompression (ED) is violent and too fast for air to escape safely from the lungs and other air-filled cavities in the body such as the sinuses and eustachian tubes, typically resulting in severe to fatal barotrauma.
- Rapid decompression may be slow enough to allow cavities to vent but may still cause serious barotrauma or discomfort.
- Slow or gradual decompression occurs so slowly that it may not be sensed before hypoxia sets in, and is unlikely to cause barotrauma, but may cause decompression sickness.

=== Altitude sickness ===
Altitude sickness, also known as acute mountain sickness (AMS), altitude illness, hypobaropathy, or soroche, is a pathological effect of high altitude on humans, caused by acute exposure to low partial pressure of oxygen and respiratory alkalosis arising from low partial pressure of blood carbon dioxide caused by hyperventilation. Altitude sickness is primarily a consequence of hypoxia. Altitude sickness can be avoided and treated by breathing supplementary oxygen, within limits.

Above the Armstrong limit, the atmospheric pressure is sufficiently low that exposed water boils at normal human body temperature. At altitudes above about 50,000 feet (15 km), the time of useful consciousness is 9 to 12 seconds. Loss of consciousness is due to hypoxia and is followed by a series of changes to cardiovascular and neurological functions, and eventually death, unless pressure is restored in 60–90 seconds. On Earth, the Armstrong limit is around 18–19 km (11–12 mi; 59,000–62,000 ft) above sea level, above which atmospheric air pressure drops below 0.0618 atm (6.3 kPa, 47 mmHg, or about 1 psi). The U.S. Standard Atmospheric model sets the Armstrong pressure at an altitude of 63,000 feet (19,202 m).

== See also ==
- Hyperbaric medicine – Medical treatment at raised ambient pressure
- Physiology of decompression – Physiological basis for decompression theory and practice
