= Physiology of decompression =

Physiological basis for decompression theory and practice

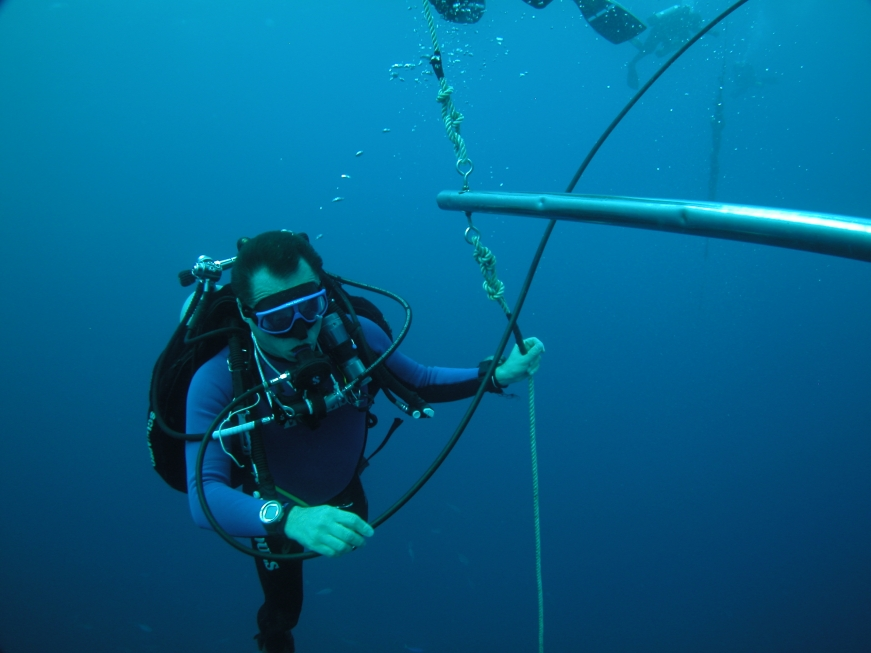
Scuba diver decompressing at a planned stop during ascent from a dive

The physiology of decompression is the aspect of physiology which is affected by exposure to large changes in ambient pressure. It involves a complex interaction of gas solubility, partial pressures and concentration gradients, diffusion, bulk transport by perfusion, and bubble mechanics in living tissues. Gas is inhaled at ambient pressure, and some of this gas dissolves into the blood through the alveolar walls, is circulated, and diffuses into other fluids of perfused tissues. Inert gas continues to be taken up until the gas dissolved in the tissues is in a state of equilibrium with the gas in the lungs (see: "Saturation diving"), or the ambient pressure is reduced until the inert gases dissolved in the tissues are at a higher concentration than the equilibrium state, and start diffusing out again.

The absorption of gases in liquids depends on the solubility of the specific gas in the specific liquid, the concentration of gas (customarily expressed as partial pressure) and temperature. In the study of decompression theory, the behaviour of gases dissolved in the body tissues is investigated and modeled for variations of pressure over time. Once dissolved, distribution of the dissolved gas is by perfusion, where the solvent (blood) is circulated around the diver's body, and by diffusion, where dissolved gas can spread to local regions of lower concentration when there is no bulk flow of the solvent. Given sufficient time at a specific partial pressure in the breathing gas, the concentration in the tissues will stabilise, or saturate, at a rate depending on the local solubility, diffusion rate and perfusion. If the concentration of the inert gas in the breathing gas is reduced below that of any of the tissues, there will be a tendency for gas to return from the tissues to the breathing gas. This is known as outgassing, and occurs during decompression, when the reduction in ambient pressure or a change of breathing gas reduces the partial pressure of the inert gas in the lungs.

The combined concentrations of gases in any given tissue will depend on the history of pressure and gas composition. Under equilibrium conditions, the total concentration of dissolved gases will be less than the ambient pressure, as oxygen is metabolised in the tissues, and the carbon dioxide produced is much more soluble. However, during a reduction in ambient pressure, the rate of pressure reduction may exceed the rate at which gas can be eliminated by diffusion and perfusion, and if the concentration gets too high, it may reach a stage where bubble formation can occur in the supersaturated tissues. When the pressure of gases in a bubble exceed the combined external pressures of ambient pressure and the surface tension from the bubble - liquid interface, the bubbles will grow, and this growth can cause damage to tissues. Symptoms caused by this damage are known as decompression sickness.

The actual rates of diffusion and perfusion, and the solubility of gases in specific tissues are not generally known, and vary considerably. However mathematical models have been proposed which approximate the real situation to a greater or lesser extent, and these decompression models are used to predict whether symptomatic bubble formation is likely to occur for a given pressure exposure profile. Efficient decompression requires the diver to ascend fast enough to establish as high a decompression gradient, in as many tissues, as safely possible, without provoking the development of symptomatic bubbles. This is facilitated by the highest acceptably safe oxygen partial pressure in the breathing gas, and avoiding gas changes that could cause counterdiffusion bubble formation or growth. The development of schedules that are both safe and efficient has been complicated by the large number of variables and uncertainties, including personal variation in response under varying environmental conditions and workload.

== Solubility ==
Solubility is the property of a gas, liquid or solid substance (the solute) to be held homogeneously dispersed as molecules or ions in a liquid or solid medium (the solvent). In decompression theory, the solubility of gases in liquids is of primary importance, as it is the formation of bubbles from these gases that causes decompression sickness.

Solubility of gases in liquids is influenced by three main factors:

- The nature of the solvent liquid and the solute
- Temperature (gases are less soluble in water but may be more soluble in organic solvents, at higher temperatures.)
- Pressure (solubility of a gas in a liquid is proportional to the partial pressure of the gas on the liquid – Henry's Law,

The presence of other solutes in the solvent can also influence solubility.

Body tissues include aqueous and lipid components in varying ratios, and the solubility of the gases involved in decompression in these tissues will vary depending on their composition.

Solubility of gases at 37 °C
Gas	Molecular weight	Lipid/water solubility ratio
Hydrogen	2	3.1
Helium	4	1.7
Neon	20	2.07
Nitrogen	28	5.2

== Diffusion ==
Diffusion is the movement of molecules or ions in a medium when there is no gross mass flow of the medium, and can occur in gases, liquids or solids, or any combination. Diffusion is driven by the kinetic energy of the diffusing molecules – it is faster in gases and slower in solids when compared with liquids due to the variation in distance between collisions, and diffusion is faster when the temperature is higher as the average energy of the molecules is greater. Diffusion is also faster in smaller, lighter molecules of which helium is the extreme example. Diffusivity of helium is 2.65 times faster than nitrogen.

The partial pressure gradient, also known as the concentration gradient, can be used as a model for the driving mechanism of diffusion. The partial pressure gradient is the rate of variation of partial pressure (or more accurately, the concentration) of the solute (dissolved gas) from one point to another in the solvent. The solute molecules will randomly collide with the other molecules present, and tend over time to spread out until the distribution is statistically uniform. This has the effect that molecules will diffuse from regions of higher concentration (partial pressure) to regions of lower concentration, and the rate of diffusion is proportional to the rate of change of the concentration. Tissues in which an inert gas is more soluble will eventually develop a higher dissolved gas content than tissues where the gas is less soluble.

== Inert gas uptake (Ingassing) ==

In this context, inert gas refers to a gas which is not metabolically active. Atmospheric nitrogen (N_{2}) is the most common example, and helium (He) is the other inert gas commonly used in breathing mixtures for divers.

Atmospheric nitrogen has a partial pressure of approximately 0.78 bar at sea level. Air in the alveoli of the lungs is diluted by saturated water vapour (H_{2}O) and carbon dioxide (CO_{2}), a metabolic product given off by the blood, and contains less oxygen (O_{2}) than atmospheric air as some of it is taken up by the blood for metabolic use. The resulting partial pressure of nitrogen is about 0.758 bar.

At atmospheric pressure, the body tissues are therefore normally saturated with nitrogen at 0.758 bar (569 mmHg). At increased ambient pressures due to depth or habitat pressurisation, a diver's lungs are filled with breathing gas at the increased pressure, and the partial pressures of the constituent gases will be increased proportionately.

For example: At 10 meters sea water (msw) the partial pressure of nitrogen in air will be 1.58 bar.

The inert gases from the breathing gas in the lungs diffuse into blood in the alveolar capillaries ("move down the pressure gradient") and are distributed around the body by the systemic circulation in the process known as perfusion.

=== Perfusion ===
Perfusion is the mass flow of blood through the tissues. Dissolved materials are transported in the blood much faster than they would be distributed by diffusion alone (order of minutes compared to hours).

The dissolved gas in the alveolar blood is transported to the body tissues by the blood circulation. There it diffuses through the cell membranes and into the tissues, where it may eventually reach equilibrium. The greater the blood supply to a tissue, the faster it will reach equilibrium with gas at the new partial pressure.

=== Saturation and supersaturation ===
If the supply of gas to a solvent is unlimited, the gas will diffuse into the solvent until there is so much dissolved that equilibrium is reached and the amount diffusing back out is equal to the amount diffusing in. This is called saturation. The concentration at saturation depends on the partial pressure of the gas in the supply and of the solubility of the gas in that solvent, under those conditions.

If the external partial pressure of the gas (in the lungs) is then reduced, more gas will diffuse out than in. A condition known as supersaturation may develop. Supersaturation by gas may be defined as a sum of all partial pressures of gases dissolved in the liquid which exceeds the ambient pressure in the liquid. The gas will not necessarily form bubbles in the solvent at this stage, but supersaturation is necessary for bubble growth. A supersaturated solution of gases in a tissue may form bubbles if suitable nucleation sites exist.

=== Tissue half times ===
If an exponential uptake of gas is assumed, which is a good approximation of experimental values for diffusion in non-living homogenous materials, half time of a tissue is the time it takes for the tissue to take up or release 50% of the difference in dissolved gas capacity at a changed partial pressure. For each consecutive half time the tissue will take up or release half again of the cumulative difference in the sequence ½, ¾, 7/8, 15/16, 31/32, 63/64 etc. The number of half times chosen to assume full saturation depends on the decompression model, and typically ranges from 4 (93.75%) to 6 (98.44%). Tissue compartment half times used in decompression modelling range from 1 minute to at least 720 minutes.

For example: A 5 minute tissue will be 50% saturated in 5 minutes, 75% in 10 minutes, 87.5% in 15 minutes and for practical purposes, saturated in about 30 minutes (98.44% saturated at 6 half times)

A specific tissue compartment will have different half times for gases with different solubilities and diffusion rates. This model may not adequately describe the dynamics of outgassing if gas phase bubbles are present.

== Outgassing of tissues ==
Gas remains dissolved in the tissues until the partial pressure of that gas in the lungs is reduced sufficiently to cause a concentration gradient with the blood at a lower concentration than the relevant tissues. A lowered partial pressure in the lungs will result in more gas diffusing out of the blood into the lung gas and less from the lung gas into the blood. A similar situation occurs between the blood and each tissue. As the concentration in the blood drops below the concentration in the adjacent tissue, the gas will diffuse out of the tissue into the blood, and will then be transported back to the lungs where it will diffuse into the lung gas and then be eliminated by exhalation. If the ambient pressure reduction is limited, this desaturation will take place in the dissolved phase, but if the ambient pressure is lowered sufficiently, bubbles may form and grow, both in blood and other supersaturated tissues.

When the gas in a tissue is at a concentration where more diffuses out than in, the tissue is said to be supersaturated with that gas relative to the surrounding tissues. Supersaturation can also be defined as when the combined partial pressures of gases dissolved in a tissue exceeds the total ambient pressure on the tissue, and there is a theoretical possibility of bubble formation or growth.

=== Inherent unsaturation ===

There is a metabolic reduction of total gas pressure in the tissues. The sum of partial pressures of the gas that the diver breathes must necessarily balance with the sum of partial pressures in the lung gas. In the alveoli the gas has been humidified by a partial pressure of approximately 63 mbar (47 mmHg) and has gained about 55 mbar (41 mmHg) carbon dioxide from the venous blood. Oxygen has also diffused into the arterial blood, reducing the partial pressure of oxygen in the alveoli by about 67 mbar(50 mmHg) As the total pressure in the alveoli must balance with the ambient pressure, this dilution results in an effective partial pressure of nitrogen of about 758 mb (569 mmHg) in air at normal atmospheric pressure.

At a steady state, when the tissues have been saturated by the inert gases of the breathing mixture, metabolic processes reduce the partial pressure of the less soluble oxygen and replace it with carbon dioxide, which is considerably more soluble in water. In the cells of a typical tissue, the partial pressure of oxygen will drop to around 13 mbar (10 mmHg), while the partial pressure of carbon dioxide will be about 65 mbar (49 mmHg). The sum of these partial pressures (water, oxygen, carbon dioxide and nitrogen) comes to roughly 900 mbar (675 mmHg), which is some 113 mbar (85 mmHg) less than the total pressure of the respiratory gas. This is a significant saturation deficit, and it provides a buffer against supersaturation and a driving force for dissolving bubbles.

Experiments suggest that the degree of unsaturation increases linearly with pressure for a breathing mixture of fixed composition, and decreases linearly with fraction of inert gas in the breathing mixture. As a consequence, the conditions for maximising the degree of unsaturation are a breathing gas with the lowest possible fraction of inert gas – i.e. pure oxygen, at the maximum permissible partial pressure. This saturation deficit is also referred to as the "Oxygen window". or partial pressure vacancy.

=== Residual inert gas tissue loading ===
When the diver surfaces after decompression there is a residual inert gas content distributed among the tissues. There is the unknown actual gas content and the modelled gas content according to the decompression algorithm. Residual gas imbalance will continue to equilibrate towards the breathing gas, and for computational purposes is assumed to continue to equilibrate in accordance with the algorithm, normally assuming atmospheric air as the breathing gas. The residual gas loading is computed and the model tissue compartments updated so that it can be used as the baseline for repetitive dives. It would also be the baseline for further decompression if the diver were to ascend to a higher altitude. Post dive oxygen or nitrox breathing will flush inert gases out of the tissues faster than air, but this is not normally calculated by dive computers. Reduced inert gas tissue loading reduces risk of developing DCS when flying or in any other way being exposed to a lower ambient pressure after diving.

== Factors influencing uptake and elimination of dissolved gases ==
The exchange of dissolved gases between the blood and tissues is controlled by perfusion and to a lesser extent by diffusion, particularly in heterogeneous tissues. The distribution of blood flow to the tissues is variable and subject to a variety of influences. When the flow is locally high, that area is dominated by perfusion, and by diffusion when the flow is low. The distribution of flow is controlled by the mean arterial pressure and the local vascular resistance, and the arterial pressure depends on cardiac output and the total vascular resistance. Basic vascular resistance is controlled by the sympathetic nervous system, and metabolites, temperature, and local and systemic hormones have secondary and often localised effects, which can vary considerably with circumstances. Peripheral vasoconstriction in cold water decreases overall heat loss without increasing oxygen consumption until shivering begins, at which point oxygen consumption will rise, though the vasoconstriction can persist.

=== Tissue gas loading ===
Tissue gas loading, the amount of gas dissolved in a tissue, influences both the rate and direction of diffusion in relation to that tissue, as it is one of the factors determining the concentration gradient. The absolute amount of gas dissolved in a tissue is not usually considered as there is no practical way of measuring it in the diver, and it is usually referred to in terms of concentration, partial pressure, or degree of saturation.

=== Breathing gas composition ===
The composition of the breathing gas during pressure exposure and decompression is significant in inert gas uptake and elimination for a given pressure exposure profile. Breathing gas mixtures for diving will typically have a different gas fraction of nitrogen to that of air. The partial pressure of each component gas will differ to that of nitrogen in air at any given depth, and uptake and elimination of each inert gas component is proportional to the actual partial pressure over time. The two foremost reasons for use of mixed breathing gases are the reduction of nitrogen partial pressure by dilution with oxygen, to make nitrox mixtures, to reduce nitrogen uptake during pressure exposure and accelerate nitrogen elimination during decompression, and the substitution of helium (and occasionally other gases) for the nitrogen to reduce the narcotic effects and work of breathing under high pressure exposure. Depending on the proportions of helium and nitrogen, these gases are called heliox if there is no nitrogen, or trimix if there is nitrogen and helium along with the essential oxygen.

The inert gases used as substitutes for nitrogen have different solubility and diffusion characteristics in living tissues to the nitrogen they replace. For example, the most common inert gas diluent substitute for nitrogen is helium, which is significantly less soluble in living tissue, but also diffuses faster due to the relatively small size and mass of the helium atom in comparison with the nitrogen molecule.

Breathing gas composition is measurable, quantifiable and is used in current decompression algorithms. For open circuit diving it is usually provided as user input, including user input of gas switches. In closed circuit rebreathers the gas composition is often calculated in real-time, using user-input diluent composition which defines the ratio of nitrogen to helium, and the measured instantaneous oxygen partial pressure.

=== Body temperature and exercise ===
Blood flow to skin and fat are affected by skin and core temperature, and resting muscle perfusion is controlled by the temperature of the muscle itself. During exercise increased flow to the working muscles is often balanced by reduced flow to other tissues, such as kidneys, spleen, and liver.

Blood flow to the muscles is lower in cold water, but exercise keeps the muscle warm and flow elevated even when the skin is chilled. Blood flow to fat normally increases during exercise, but this is inhibited by immersion in cold water. Adaptation to cold reduces the extreme vasoconstriction which usually occurs with cold water immersion.

Exercise that increases heart rate increases overall perfusion, which will increase the rate of transport of inert gases to and from the more perfused tissues, and higher temperature of tissues will increase the rate of diffusion through those tissues. There is a tradeoff during decompression between mild exercise enhancing inert gas elimination and strenuous exercise triggering bubble formation and growth.

Variations in perfusion distribution do not necessarily affect respiratory inert gas exchange, though some gas may be locally constrained by changes in perfusion. Rest in a cold environment will reduce inert gas exchange from skin, fat and muscle, whereas exercise will increase gas exchange where perfusion is increased. Exercise during decompression can reduce decompression time and risk, providing bubbles are not present, but can increase risk if bubbles are present.

Inert gas exchange is least favourable for the diver who is warm and exercises at depth during the ingassing phase, and rests and is cold during decompression, and most favourable for the diver who is cool and relaxed at depth during ingassing, and warm with mild exercise during decompression.

=== Isobaric counterdiffusion ===
Isobaric counterdiffusion (ICD) is the diffusion of gases in opposite directions caused by a change in the composition of the external ambient gas or breathing gas without change in the ambient pressure. During decompression after a dive this can occur when a change is made to the breathing gas, or when the diver moves into a gas filled environment which differs from the breathing gas.

While not strictly speaking a phenomenon of decompression, it is a complication that can occur during decompression, and that can result in the formation or growth of bubbles without changes in the environmental pressure. Two forms of this phenomenon have been described by Lambertsen:

Superficial ICD (also known as steady state isobaric counterdiffusion) occurs when the inert gas breathed by the diver diffuses more slowly into the body than the inert gas surrounding the body.

An example of this would be breathing air in a heliox environment. The helium in the heliox diffuses into the skin quickly, while the nitrogen diffuses more slowly from the capillaries to the skin and out of the body. The resulting effect generates supersaturation in certain sites of the superficial tissues and the formation of inert gas bubbles.

Deep tissue ICD (also known as transient isobaric counterdiffusion) occurs when different inert gases are breathed by the diver in sequence. The rapidly diffusing gas is transported into the tissue faster than the slower diffusing gas is transported out of the tissue.

This can occur as divers switch from a nitrogen mixture to a helium mixture (diffusivity of helium is 2.65 times faster than nitrogen), or when saturation divers breathing hydreliox switch to a heliox mixture.

There is another effect which can manifest as a result of the disparity in solubility between inert breathing gas diluents, which occurs in isobaric gas switches near the decompression ceiling between a low solubility gas, typically helium, and a higher solubility gas, typically nitrogen.

An inner ear decompression model by Doolette and Mitchell suggests that a transient increase in gas tension after a switch from helium to nitrogen in breathing gas may result from the difference in gas transfer between compartments. If the transport of nitrogen into the vascular compartment by perfusion exceeds removal of helium by perfusion, while transfer of helium into the vascular compartment by diffusion from the perilymph and endolymph exceeds the counterdiffusion of nitrogen, this may result in a temporary increase in total gas tension, as the input of nitrogen exceeds the removal of helium, which can result in bubble formation and growth. This model suggests that diffusion of gases from the middle ear across the round window is negligible. The model is not necessarily applicable to all tissue types.

Lambertsen made suggestions to help avoid ICD problems while diving:

- If the diver is surrounded by or saturated with nitrogen, they should not breathe helium rich gases.
- Gas switches that involve going from helium rich mixtures to nitrogen rich mixtures would be acceptable, but changes from nitrogen to helium should include recompression.

However Doolette and Mitchell's more recent study of inner ear decompression sickness (IEDCS) shows that the inner ear may not be well-modelled by common (e.g. Bühlmann) algorithms. Doolette and Mitchell propose that a switch from a helium-rich mix to a nitrogen-rich mix, as is common in technical diving when switching from trimix to nitrox on ascent, may cause a transient supersaturation of inert gas within the inner ear and result in IEDCS. They suggest that breathing-gas switches from helium-rich to nitrogen-rich mixtures should be carefully scheduled either deep (with due consideration to nitrogen narcosis) or shallow to avoid the period of maximum supersaturation resulting from the decompression. Switches should also be made during breathing of the largest inspired oxygen partial pressure that can be safely tolerated with due consideration to oxygen toxicity.

A similar hypothesis to explain the incidence of IEDCS when switching from trimix to nitrox was proposed by Steve Burton, who considered the effect of the much greater solubility of nitrogen than helium in producing transient increases in total inert gas pressure, which could lead to DCS under isobaric conditions.

Burton argues that effect of switching to Nitrox from Trimix with a large increase of nitrogen fraction at constant pressure has the effect of increasing the overall gas loading within particularly the faster tissues, since the loss of helium is more than compensated by the increase in nitrogen. This could cause immediate bubble formation and growth in the fast tissues. A simple rule for avoidance of ICD problems when gas switching at a decompression ceiling is suggested:

- Any increase in gas fraction of nitrogen in the decompression gas should be limited to 1/5 of the decrease in gas fraction of helium.

This rule has been found to successfully avoid ICD problems on hundreds of deep trimix dives.

== Bubble formation, growth and elimination ==
The location of micronuclei or where bubbles initially form is not known. Heterogeneous nucleation and tribonucleation are considered the most likely mechanism for bubble formation. Homogeneous nucleation requires much greater pressure differences than experienced in decompression. The spontaneous formation of nanobubbles on hydrophobic surfaces is a possible source of micronuclei, but it is not yet clear if these can grow to symptomatic dimensions as they are very stable.

The incorporation of bubble formation and growth mechanisms in decompression models may make the models more biophysical and allow better extrapolation.

Flow conditions and perfusion rates are dominant parameters in competition between tissue and circulation bubbles, and between multiple bubbles, for dissolved gas for bubble growth.

=== Bubble mechanics ===
Equilibrium of forces on the surface is required for a bubble to exist. These are:

- Ambient pressure, exerted on the outside of the surface, acting inwards
- Pressure due to tissue distortion, also on the outside and acting inwards
- Surface tension of the liquid at the interface between the bubble and the surroundings. This is along the surface of the bubble, so the resultant acts towards the centre of curvature. This will tend to squeeze the bubble, and is more severe for small bubbles as it is an inverse function of the radius.
- The resulting forces must be balanced by the pressure on the inside of the bubble. This is the sum of the partial pressures of the gases inside due to the net diffusion of gas to and from the bubble.
- The force balance in the bubble may be modified by a layer of surface active molecules which can stabilise a microbubble at a size where surface tension on a clean bubble would cause it to collapse rapidly.
- This surface layer may vary in permeability, so that if the bubble is compressed it may become impermeable to diffusion at sufficient compression. Permeability may vary depending on the specific gas.

If the solvent outside the bubble is saturated or unsaturated, the partial pressure will be less than in the bubble, and the surface tension will be increasing the internal pressure in direct proportion to surface curvature, providing a pressure gradient to increase diffusion out of the bubble, effectively "squeezing the gas out of the bubble", and the smaller the bubble the faster it will get squeezed out. A gas bubble can only grow at constant ambient pressure if the surrounding solvent is sufficiently supersaturated to overcome the surface tension or if the surface layer around the bubble provides sufficient reaction to overcome surface tension.

Clean bubbles that are sufficiently small will collapse due to surface tension if the supersaturation is low. Bubbles with semipermeable surfaces will either stabilise at a specific radius depending on the pressure, the composition of the surface layer, and the supersaturation, or continue to grow indefinitely, if larger than the critical radius.

=== Bubble nucleation ===
Bubble formation occurs in the blood or other tissues. One of the hypothetical loci of bubble nucleation is in crevices in macromolecules, but the actual sites of bubble formation in tissues are not known.

A solvent can carry a supersaturated load of gas in solution. Whether it will come out of solution in the bulk of the solvent to form bubbles will depend on a number of factors. Something which reduces surface tension, or adsorbs gas molecules, or locally reduces solubility of the gas, or causes a local reduction in static pressure in a fluid may result in a bubble nucleation or growth. This may include velocity changes and turbulence in fluids and local tensile loads in solids and semi-solids. Lipids and other hydrophobic surfaces may reduce surface tension (blood vessel walls may have this effect). Dehydration may reduce gas solubility in a tissue due to higher concentration of other solutes, and less solvent to hold the gas.

Another theory presumes that microscopic bubble nuclei always exist in aqueous media, including living tissues. These bubble nuclei are spherical gas phases that are small enough to remain in suspension yet strong enough to resist collapse, their stability being provided by an elastic surface layer consisting of surface-active molecules which resists the effect of surface tension.

=== Bubble growth ===
Once a micro-bubble forms it may continue to grow if the tissues are still supersaturated. As the bubble grows it may distort the surrounding tissue and cause damage to cells and pressure on nerves resulting in pain, or may block a blood vessel, cutting off blood flow and causing hypoxia in the tissues normally perfused by the vessel.

If a bubble or an object exists which collects gas molecules, this collection of gas molecules may reach a size where the internal pressure exceeds the combined surface tension and external pressure and the bubble will grow. If the solvent is sufficiently supersaturated, the diffusion of gas into the bubble will exceed the rate at which it diffuses back into solution, and if this excess pressure is greater than the pressure due to surface tension the bubble will continue to grow. When a bubble grows, the surface tension decreases, and the interior pressure drops, allowing gas to diffuse in faster, and diffuse out slower, so the bubble grows or shrinks in a positive feedback situation. The growth rate is reduced as the bubble grows because the surface area increases as the square of the radius, while the volume increases as the cube of the radius. If the external pressure is reduced due to reduced hydrostatic pressure during ascent, the bubble will also grow, and conversely, an increased external pressure will cause the bubble to shrink, but may not cause it to be eliminated if a compression-resistant surface layer exists.

The Variable Permeability Model ordering hypothesis states that nuclei are neither created nor eliminated during the pressure cycle, and the initial ordering according to size is preserved. Therefore, each bubble count is determined by the properties and behaviour of a nominal "critical" nucleus which is at the threshold of bubble-formation – all larger nuclei will form bubbles, and all smaller nuclei will not.

=== Bubble distribution ===
Decompression bubbles appear to form mostly in the systemic capillaries where the gas concentration is highest, often those feeding the veins draining the active limbs. They do not generally form in the arteries provided that ambient pressure reduction is not too rapid, as arterial blood has recently had the opportunity to release excess gas into the lungs. Some of the bubbles carried back to the heart in the veins may be transferred to the systemic circulation via a patent foramen ovale in divers with this septal defect, after which there is a risk of occlusion of capillaries in whichever part of the body they end up in.

Bubbles are also known to form within other tissues, where they may cause damage leading to symptoms of decompression sickness. This damage is likely to be caused by mechanical deformation and stresses on the cells rather than local hypoxia, which is an assumed mechanism in the case of gas embolism of the capillaries.

=== Bubble elimination ===
Bubbles which are carried back to the heart in the veins will normally pass into the right side of the heart, and from there they will normally enter the pulmonary circulation and eventually pass through or be trapped in the capillaries of the lungs, which are around the alveoli and very near to the respiratory gas, where the gas will diffuse from the bubbles though the capillary and alveolar walls into the gas in the lung. If the number of lung capillaries blocked by these bubbles is relatively small, the diver will not display symptoms, and no tissue will be damaged (lung tissues are adequately oxygenated by diffusion).

The bubbles which are small enough to pass through the lung capillaries may be small enough to be dissolved due to a combination of surface tension and diffusion to a lowered concentration in the surrounding blood, though the Varying Permeability Model nucleation theory implies that most bubbles passing through the pulmonary circulation will lose enough gas to pass through the capillaries and return to the systemic circulation as recycled but stable nuclei.

Bubbles which form within the tissues must be eliminated in situ by diffusion, which implies a suitable concentration gradient.

== Modes of decompression ==
Modes of decompression, or depressurisation, may be classified as either slow, rapid, or explosive, where explosive decompression is defined an occurring in less than half a second in an aircraft, and where there is severe risk of lung barotrauma. Rapid decompression takes longer, and the risk of pulmonary barotrauma is lower. Gradual decompression occurs slowly and may initially not be noticed. Decompression may be a planned and controlled process or uncontrolled, which is usually unintended, and may be from a compression exposure back to the pressure of normal saturation, of from a saturated state to a lower pressure. These factors all influence the physiological effects and response.

== Decompression stress ==
Biological stress is a concept developed by Hans Selye, and can be defined as a "general pathophysiological response, where similar symptoms and signs develop in response to a variety of agents and conditions". This phenomenon is also known as the general adaptation syndrome. Decompression is a stressor, and decompression stress is the effect on the organism of the physical and physiological factors associated with decompression. Even without producing acute signs and symptoms, vascular gas bubbles can be an indicator of the magnitude of decompression stress, and as most dives where gas bubbles form only produce minimal symptoms, they may be useful as an indicator of the risk of injury in a particular dive, and therefore could be useful to help develop safer procedures.

Decompression stress has also been described as the amount of inert gas dissolved in various tissues throughout the body, but this is not meaningful unless compared with the amount that would be stable in those tissues at the current ambient pressure. It is the combined effect of all the factors influencing the formation of inert gas bubbles in the tissues during and after decompression. Decompression stress does not necessarily result in decompression sickness, but it is a necessary precondition. Some of these factors are known and can be measured and quantified, others are known, suspected or hypothetical, but not measurable or quantifiable, and some may still be entirely unknown. Decompression stress has been cited as a driver of bubble growth and a risk factor for symptomatic decompression sickness in humans and diving animals.

Post-dive fatigue and lethargy are common complaints of divers. They are not generally recognised as syptoms of decompression sickness in the absence of any of the classic symptoms, but are thought to be indicators of high decompression stress.

=== Factors influencing decompression stress and risk ===
The pressure exposure history and breathing gas mixtures in combination have the greatest influence on the level of decompression stress and are the easiest set of factors to measure and quantify. They are the primary generator of decompression stress, without which DCS cannot develop. Pressure exposure in divers is usually represented by the dive profile.

Other factors which affect decompression risk include oxygen concentration, carbon dioxide levels, body position, environmental temperature and its effects on body temperature and temperature distribution, vasodilators and constrictors, positive or negative pressure breathing. work of breathing effects of gas density, exertion, and dehydration, which causes reduced blood volume and increased concentration of solutes in what remains. These factors influence the transport of dissolved gases by diffusion and perfusion, and therefore affect the rate of uptake and elimination. There are also effects due to bubble presence such as microparticles, oxidative stress, neutrophil activation, and endothelium damage.

Individual susceptibility to decompression sickness has components which can be attributed to a specific cause, and components which appear to be random. The random component makes successive decompressions a poor test of susceptibility. Obesity and high serum lipid levels have been implicated by some studies as risk factors, and risk seems to increase with age. Another study has also shown that older subjects tended to bubble more than younger subjects for reasons not yet known, but no trends between weight, body fat, or gender and bubbles were identified, and the question of why some people are more likely to develop bubbles than others remains unclear.

==== Dive profile ====
The dive profile has the greatest influence on the level of decompression stress in divers, and is the easiest set of factors to measure and quantify. It is the primary generator of decompression stress, and without it there is no decompression stress and DCS cannot develop. Recent dive history affects the amount of inert gas loading of the tissues at the start of the dive, to which additional gas is added during the dive, contributing to the load that must be eliminated during the decompression. The depth and density of the diving medium, plus the externally applied pressure (usually atmospheric pressure), provide the ambient pressure driving ingassing and outgassing. The time spent at depth affects the uptake and elimination of inert gases by way of diffusion and perfusion. The partial pressure of the inert gas component of the breathing gas controls the concentration gradient driving diffusion into and out of the tissues. After sufficient exposure all tissues are saturated and previous dive history becomes irrelevant.

Ascent rate controls the rate of reduction of ambient pressure. Decompression stops provide the time required for outgassing to reduce concentrations to levels calculated to be acceptably safe, before ascent is continued. The surface atmospheric pressure is the endpoint of in-water decompression, a lower atmospheric pressure requires more gas to be eliminated during decompression to reach safe tissue supersaturation levels on surfacing. The surface atmospheric pressure is mainly a function of altitude, but there is also a small influence from the variations in barometric pressure due to meteorological influences.

==== Exercise ====
The exercise done during a dive can be considered under three aspects: the type of exercise, the stage of the dive in which it is done, and the intensity of the exercise. Each of these parameters is highly variable, which makes the combined effect complex to evaluate, as the same type of exercise can have different effects depending on when it occurs and the physiological effects it has on the specific diver. In general, exercise will increase circulation, perfusion, and peripheral body temperature which during ingassing stages of a dive will accelerate inert gas uptake, which will increase decompression stress on ascent for a given profile. Exercise during outgassing stages will promote inert gas elimination, reducing decompression stress, but higher intensity exercise at a time of high decompression stress may raise local tissue stress sufficiently to promote bubble formation and growth, particularly in joints, where perfusion is limited. The amount and intensity of effort required is not always entirely under the control of the diver, and is influenced by both skill and circumstances. Measurement of exercise intensity in a way that is useful for input into a decompression algorithm is difficult, and the effects are poorly understood. Heart rate, ventilatory rate, and ventilatory exchange of oxygen and carbon dioxide can indicate exercise intensity, but each of these can be confounded by effects independent of exercise intensity, and they are probably also mainly proxies for perfusion. Even if the data could be easily collected, it is not known how it would be usefully used. Some manufacturers have started to measure heart rate, but there are not yet any dive computers that can evaluate exercise intensity in a way that can be used in a decompression algorithm in a meaningful way. Exercise before a dive can also affect the probability of symptomatic DCS, with the effects being associated with how long before the dive the exercise is done. The mechanism for this is also poorly understood. There is inconclusive evidence that prolonged periods of low activity before diving may increase susceptibility to decompression stress.

==== Thermal status ====
The thermal status of a diver can influence decompression stress, largely by effects on perfusion at different stages of the dive. A diver who is warm will be more thoroughly perfused than a cold diver, and perfusion of particular tissues and organs will affect the amount of inert gas available for dissolving in those tissues during the ingassing part of the dive, and similarly, will affect the transport of excess dissolved gas to the lungs where it can be eliminated during the decompression stages of the dive. Water temperature is relevant only as a factor influencing the body temperature and heat distribution of the diver, and heat distribution in the diver is mainly relevant as a factor influencing perfusion distribution. Systematic tests have shown that the timing of thermal status is important. Body warmth, promoting high perfusion during ingassing, promotes high inert gas loading, which increases decompression risk. Body warmth during decompression, and the associated higher overall perfusion, promotes high rates of outgassing, and reduces decompression risk. Keeping divers warm throughout the dive can result in higher venous bubble counts. The use of hot water suits can increase DCS incidence compared with passive insulation from dry suits, and late-dive and post-dive cooling can extend the period of risk for developing DCS. The best case for minimising decompression risk is low perfusion associated with lower peripheral temperatures during ingassing and high perfusion during decompression, and the worst case is for high perfusion during ingassing and low perfusion of tissues with a high gas loading during decompression. As of 2016 there is no effective measurement of body temperature distribution which can usefully predict gas transfer rates into or out of tissues based on temperature distribution or effective perfusion, or any evidence based way to integrate temperature measurement into decompression algorithms.

==== Predisposition ====
Predisposition to decompression stress is a category into which a range of factors of varying and in some cases uncertain importance have been grouped. Some of these are inherent to the diver, others are variable and affected by what the diver does. Several of them influence perfusion. None of them are currently (2023) quantifiable in a way that can be objectively measured and integrated into a decompression algorithm.

Dehydration is probably a factor, but the effects are not quantitatively understood. Some research shows that dehydration can increase the risk of DCS, but excessive hydration is also a problem as it increases the risk of immersion pulmonary oedema. Also, since dehydration may be a symptom or consequence of DCS, there may be some confusion between cause and effect. Dehydration may affect perfusion, and may also affect solubility of gases in the tissues.

Physical fitness is also a factor which is not quantitatively understood. A diver needs to be fit enough to cope with the normal demands of diving and to have enough reserve capacity to deal with reasonably foreseeable contingencies. There are also data suggesting that higher levels of fitness are associated with lower risk of DCS. Subjects with a high aerobic capacity appear to produce lower post-decompression bubble counts, which is qualitatively associated with lower decompression stress.

A history of recurring decompression sickness may indicate a physiological perdisposition to DCS, or a behavioural tendency in the diver or people they dive with (peer pressure or buddy behaviour can influence the behaviour of others in a group). It may be possible by analysing the diving history of the individual to identify ways to reduce future risk, though this is not always the case, as some hits are not amenable to confident explanation.

Increasing age appears to increase susceptibility to DCS, but it is not clear which of the effects of aging actually cause the increased risk. Reduced levels of physical fitness, and changes in health and diving practice may all be proxies for a more basic physiological change, such as less effective perfusion, changes in tissue gas capacity, or altered gas transfer efficiency in the lungs.

There is some evidence from chamber inside attendants that women are at slightly greater risk during the first part of the menstrual cycle, but this is not supported by evidence from the diving literature. This could be due to the more controlled and repeatable conditions in standardised chamber treatment exposure being more sensitive to small variations in personal susceptibility, which are lost in the noise in diving exposures.

While circulation is clearly a factor in the physiology of decompression, as perfusion is recognised as a limiting factor in dissolved gas transport to and from the tissues, and in the transport and distribution of vascular bubbles during decompression, there is little empirical evidence of altered risk due to compromised circulation due to prior injury, body positioning, or even dehydration. The presence of a patent foramen ovale has the potential to allow venous blood containing decompression bubbles to bypass filtration the pulmonary capillary network, and has been identified as a risk factor for serious DCS, but although PFO frequency is high, the incidence of serious DCS is low, and the degree of patency very variable. PFO is also not the only path for bubbles to reach the systemic arterial circulation, as they can also be shunted in the pulmonary circulation, and this can be increased by exercise.

Various factors which may be classified as biological health may influence decompression stress. The importance and mechanism of such factors has not been established, and the roles may be minor or important. Nutritional status is important for general health and affects physical fitness, so it may affect decompression safety. High cholesterol levels have been found to be statistically associated with high bubble counts, but no causative mechanism has been investigated. Little information is available on the effects of drugs on decompression risk, but some can profoundly affect physiological and mental processes, so it is reasonable to assume that there may be unknown effects on decompression risk. It is difficult to measure the effects as there is such a wide range of drugs, dosages and potential interactions between combinations of drugs. Genetic predisposition and epigenetic expression affect various aspects of physiology, and may influence susceptibility and response to decompression stress, but this has not yet been studied.

Acclimatisation: Adaptive change in response to repeated exposure, can produce an increased or decreased response, effectively a sensitisation or desensitization to the presence of dissolved inert gas. Published data are conflicting, but this could be an artifact of behaviour. A test series designed to reduce confounding factors suggests that relatively lower bubble counts are likely over a series of similar dive profiles on consecutive days.

==== Behavioural or procedural factors ====
Based on observations in the field, Pyle (2001) has hypothesized that some behavioural factors at the end of deep technical dives may influence decompression stress and the risk of developing symptoms shortly after exit from the water.

- Sudden drop in ambient pressure during an ascent to the surface from a 6 m final stop on oxygen.
- A shift from breathing oxygen at the final 6 m decompression stop at a partial pressure of 1.6 bar to breathing air at the surface with a partial pressure of 0.2 bar, could have vasodilatory effects during the period directly after surfacing.
- The sudden change in level of exertion from the fairly relaxed period of decompression to the relatively heavy exertion of climbing out of the water with heavy equipment, or swimming in rough sea conditions.
- The sudden effect of exiting the water on blood distribution as the support of hydrostatic pressure is removed in the upright position could cause blood shift back from the core to the legs, reversing the effects of immersion at the start of the dive.

It is common for all four of these changes to happen in very close succession.

== Decompression disorders and injuries ==
Types of injury and physiological disorder that can be caused by decompression include decompression sickness, barotraumas of decompression and ebullism syndrome. These injuries types can be present singly or in combination.

Decompression sickness is caused by inert gas bubble formation in supersaturated tissues, barotraumas of decompression are usually caused by rapid decompression where gas spaces are not able to equalise pressure with the surroundings, and ebullism occurs only in cases of decompression to very low ambient pressures.

=== Decompression sickness ===
Intravascular bubbles cause clumping of red blood cells, platelets are used up, white blood cells activated, vascular permeability is increased. The gas in a bubble will equilibrate with the surrounding tissues and will therefore contain water vapor, oxygen, and carbon dioxide, as well as the inert gas. Vascular bubbles appear to form at the venous end of capillaries and pass through the veins to the right side of the heart, and thereafter are circulated to the lungs.

==== Problems due to vascular decompression bubbles ====
Bubbles may be trapped in the lung capillaries, temporarily blocking them. If this is severe, the symptom called "chokes" may occur.

If the diver has a patent foramen ovale (PFO) or a pulmonary shunt, bubbles may pass through it, and bypass the pulmonary capillaries in which gas exchange occurs, to enter the arterial blood. If these bubbles are not absorbed in the arterial plasma and lodge in systemic capillaries they will block the flow of oxygenated blood to the tissues supplied by those capillaries, and those tissues will be starved of oxygen. Moon and Kisslo (1988) concluded that "the evidence suggests that the risk of serious neurological DCI or early onset DCI is increased in divers with a resting right-to-left shunt through a PFO. There is, at present, no evidence that PFO is related to mild or late onset bends."

==== Extravascular bubbles ====
Bubbles may form within other tissues as well as the blood vessels. Inert gas can diffuse into bubble nuclei between tissues. In this case, the bubbles can distort and permanently damage the tissue. These bubbles may also compress nerves as they grow, causing pain.

Extravascular or autochthonous^{[a]} bubbles usually form in slow tissues such as joints, tendons and muscle sheaths. Direct expansion causes tissue damage, with the release of histamines and their associated affects. Biochemical damage may be as important as, or more important than mechanical effects.

=== Barotraumas of decompression ===
Barotrauma is physical damage to body tissues caused by a difference in pressure between a gas space inside, or in contact with, the body and the surrounding gas or liquid. The initial damage is usually due to over-stretching the tissues in tension or shear, either directly by an expansion of the gas in the closed space or by pressure difference hydrostatically transmitted through the tissue. Tissue rupture may be complicated by the introduction of gas into the local tissue or circulation through the initial trauma site, which can cause blockage of circulation at distant sites or interfere with the normal function of an organ by its presence. The term is usually applied when the gas volume involved already exists prior to decomptession. Barotrama can occur during both compression and decompression events.

Barotrauma of decompression generally manifests as sinus or middle ear effects, lung overpressure injuries and overexpansion of gases in the gastrointestinal tract.

Barotrauma typically occurs when the organism is exposed to a significant change in ambient pressure, such as when a scuba diver, a free-diver or an airplane passenger ascends or descends or during uncontrolled decompression of a pressure vessel such as a diving chamber or pressurized aircraft, but can also be caused by a shock wave. Ventilator-induced lung injury (VILI) is a condition caused by over-expansion of the lungs by mechanical ventilation used when the body is unable to breathe for itself and is associated with relatively large tidal volumes and relatively high peak pressures.

=== Ebullism ===
Ebullism is the formation of water vapour bubbles in bodily fluids due to reduced environmental pressure, usually at extreme high altitude. It occurs because a system of liquid and gas at equilibrium will see a net conversion of liquid to gas as pressure lowers; for example, liquids reach their boiling points at lower temperatures when the pressure on them is lowered. The injuries and disorder caused by ebullism is also known as ebullism syndrome. Ebullism will expand the volume of the tissues, but the vapour pressure of water at temperatures in which a human can survive is not sufficient to rupture skin or most other tissues encased in skin. Ebullism produces predictable injuries, which may be survivable if treated soon enough, and is often accompanied by complications caused by rapid decompression, such as decompression sickness and a variety of barotrauma injuries. Persons at risk are astronauts and high altitude aviators.

== Saturation decompression ==
Decompression from saturation is a special case where the tissues are all initially saturated with the maximum stable inert gas load for the ambient pressure and breathing gas mixture combination. In this situation it can be shown that the controlling tissue for decompression is always the slowest tissue. This makes schedule calculation relatively simple as the same schedule is always valid for a given pressure and breathing gas mixture combination, and the same schedule can be followed for a given breathing gas mixture, starting from the actual saturation pressure, though the schedule can be affected by using a different gas mixture for decompression. This is often done by using a higher partial pressure of oxygen during decompression than during the saturation exposure.

=== Saturation decompression in diving ===
Graphic representation of the NORSOK U-100 (2009) saturation decompression schedule from 180 msw, starting at 06h00 and taking 7 days, 15 hours with Oxygen partial pressure maintained between 0.4 and 0.5 bar

Saturation decompression in diving is a physiological process of transition from a steady state of full saturation with inert gas at raised pressure to standard conditions at normal surface atmospheric pressure. It is a long process during which inert gases are eliminated at a very low rate limited by the slowest affected tissues, and a deviation from schedule that reduces pressure more rapidly can cause the formation of gas bubbles which can produce decompression sickness. Most operational decompression procedures rely on experimentally derived parameters describing a continuous slow decompression rate, which may depend on depth and gas mixture.

In saturation diving all tissues are considered initially saturated and decompression which is safe for the slowest tissues will theoretically be safe for all faster tissues in a parallel model. Direct ascent from air saturation at approximately 7 msw produces venous gas bubbles but not symptomatic DCS. Deeper saturation exposures require decompression to saturation schedules.

The safe rate of decompression from a saturation dive is controlled by the partial pressure of oxygen in the inspired breathing gas. The inherent unsaturation due to the oxygen window allows a relatively fast initial phase of saturation decompression in proportion to the oxygen partial pressure and then controls the rate of further decompression limited by the half-time of inert gas elimination from the slowest compartment. However, some saturation decompression schedules specifically do not allow a decompression to start with an upward excursion. (Note: An upward excursion at the start of decompression from saturation is a relatively rapid reduction in pressure within the upward excursion limits for the depth and gas mixture, with low risk of bubble formation, to increase the concentration gradient driving outgassing.) Neither the excursions during dives, nor the decompression procedures currently in use (as of 2016) have been found to cause decompression problems in isolation, but there appears to be significantly higher risk when excursions are followed by decompression before non-symptomatic bubbles resulting from excursions during dives have totally resolved. Starting decompression while bubbles are present appears to be the triggering factor in many cases of otherwise unexpected decompression sickness during routine saturation decompression.

Application of a bubble model in 1985 allowed successful modelling of conventional decompressions, altitude decompression, no-stop thresholds, and saturation dives using one setting of four global nucleation parameters. Research continues on saturation decompression modelling and schedule testing. In 2015 a concept named Extended Oxygen Window was used in preliminary tests for a modified saturation decompression model. This model allows a faster rate of decompression at the start of the ascent to utilise the inherent unsaturation due to metabolic use of oxygen, followed by a constant rate limited by oxygen partial pressure of the breathing gas. The period of constant decompression rate is also limited by the allowable maximum oxygen fraction, and when this limit is reached, decompression rate slows down again as the partial pressure of oxygen is reduced. The procedure remains experimental as of May 2016. The goal is an acceptably safe reduction of overall decompression time for a given saturation depth and gas mixture.

=== Altitude and hypobaric decompression ===
Altitude decompression or hypobaric decompression is the reduction in ambient pressure below the normal range of sea level atmospheric pressure. Altitude decompression is the natural consequence of unprotected ascent to high altitude, while hypobaric decompression is due to intentional or unintentional release of pressurisation of a pressure suit or pressurised compartment, vehicle or habitat, and may be controlled or uncontrolled, and includes decompression in preparation for space extravehicular activity, or the reduction of pressure in a hypobaric chamber.

Altitude decompression may occur as a decompression from saturation at a lower altitude, or as decompression from an excursion to a lower altitude, in the case of people living at high altitude, making a short duration trip to low altitude, and returning, or a person decompressing from a dive at altitude, which is a special case of diving decompression.

Abrupt excursions from sea level to altitudes above 15,000 feet (4,600 m) without oxygen prebreathing may induce venous gas bubbles. Hypobaric decompression can in extreme cases lead to boiling of liquids when the pressure is reduced below the vapour pressure for the temperature of the liquid. For water at normal body temperature this altitude is known as the Armstrong limit. Boiling of internal body fluids at extreme low pressures called ebullism and is limited by vapour pressure buildup within the tissues. The water vapour may bloat the body to twice its normal volume and slow circulation, but tissues are elastic and strong enough to prevent rupture. Technically, ebullism is considered to begin at an elevation of around 19 kilometres (12 mi) or pressures less than 6.3 kPa (47 mm Hg).At pressures where ebullism can occur, even 100% oxygen is not sufficient to support consciousness or life.

== Ultrasonic bubble detection in decompression research ==
Doppler bubble detection equipment uses ultrasonic signals reflected from bubble surfaces to identify and quantify gas bubbles present in venous blood. This method was used by Dr Merrill Spencer of the Institute of Applied Physiology and Medicine in Seattle, who published a report in 1976 recommending that the then current no-decompression limits be reduced on the basis that large counts of venous gas bubbles were detected in divers exposed to the US Navy no-decompression limits. These non-symptomatic bubbles have become known as "silent bubbles", and are thought to contain nitrogen released from solution during ascent. Other early work on Doppler detection of inert gas bubbles in decompression was done by Alf O. Brubakk, at the Norwegian Underwater Institute. Doppler detection of venous bubbles has become an important tool in decompression research, partly because it allows a non-symptomatic endpoint for experimental work, and partly because the equipment has become relatively affordable for field surveys on divers conducting ordinary recreational, technical and professional dives. Doppler bubble detection has also been used in saturation diving research.

Doppler signals for bubbles are generally output as an audible signal, and may be graded according to the Spencer scale or the Kisman-Masurel scale. The Spencer scale was developed by Spencer and Johanson in 1974, and recognizes 5 grades of bubble signal against the background sounds of cardiac function:

Grade 0: No bubble signals detected
Grade I: Occasional bubble signals detected - The majority of cardiac cycles are bubble-free
Grade II: Many, but less than half of the cardiac cycles contain bubble signals
Grade III: All cardiac cycles contain bubble signals, but they do not obscure the signals of cardiac activity
Grade IV: Bubble signals are continuous, and obscure the sounds of normal heart function

The Kisman-Masurel scale is similar, and gives a more subtle gradation of bubbles, but is more difficult to rate proficiently. The Spencer scale has been more popular in practice. Grade categories are non-linear and cannot be averaged.

The usual site for monitoring bubbles is Precordial monitoring of the pulmonary artery, as it combines all the blood returning to the body before it goes to the lungs, so it is least likely to miss bubbles from a peripheral source, and is most compatible with the Spencer and K-M scales, as heart sounds are clearly audible. Other sites which have been used include the subclavian vein, carotid artery, femoral vein and inferior vena cava. Protocols for ultrasonic investigation of decompression bubbles are still in development, and may vary between researchers.

Other methods of non-invasive bubble detection include two-dimensional echocardiography, but Doppler appears to be more sensitive and picks up smaller bubbles.

Two dimensional imaging can provide a cross-sectional view along a single plane of all four chambers of the heart, and therefore, unlike Doppler, which assesses blood prior to primary filtration by the lungs, can also assess blood which will be circulated systemically. Echocardiography equipment has developed from bulky laboratory equipment to portable battery-powered units with sufficient resolution to be suitable for field studies. Transthoracic echocardiography is suitable for the sampling used in decompression studies to identify highly reflective gas bubbles. Detection of venous gas bubbles by ultrasound imaging is a sensitive, but not specific, predictor of adverse effects of decompression, similar to the published relationship between Doppler detected bubbles and decompression sickness.

The utility of Doppler-detected bubbles in the pulmonary arteries for reliably predicting clinical DCS is low. The correlation between Doppler-detected intravascular bubbles and decompression sickness is that almost all divers who developed DCS after a dive produced large numbers of bubbles, but even grade 3 or 4 bubbles could manifest without signs or symptoms of DCS, and grades 0, 1 and 2 bubbles are associated with very low risk. In a series of tests by Sawatsky, Grade 3 bubbles were associated with a 5% risk and Grade 4 with about 10% risk. Bubbles may occur after exposures that have very good safety records. The utility of bubble detection is in assessing relative decompression stress, and can be used in non-symptomatic divers as a safer threshold for assessing acceptable decompression stress than the incidence of clinical symptoms for evaluating decompression algorithms. An absence of detectable pulmonary arterial bubbles is a strong indicator that any clinical signs or symptoms that may manifest are not caused by DCS.

== See also ==
- Decompression practice – Techniques and procedures for safe decompression of divers
- Decompression sickness – Disorder caused by dissolved gases forming bubbles in tissues
- Decompression (diving) – Pressure reduction and its effects during ascent from depth
- Decompression theory – Theoretical modelling of decompression physiology
- Equivalent air depth – Method of comparing decompression requirements for air and a given nitrox mix
- Equivalent narcotic depth – Method for comparing the narcotic effects of a mixed diving gas with air
- History of decompression research and development
- Hyperbaric treatment schedules – Planned hyperbaric exposure using a specified breathing gas as medical treatment
- Oxygen window – Difference between the partial pressures of oxygen in arterial blood and body tissues
- Decompression models:
  - Bühlmann decompression algorithm – Mathematical model of tissue inert gas uptake and release with pressure change
  - Haldane's decompression model – Decompression model developed by John Scott Haldane
  - Reduced gradient bubble model – Decompression algorithm
  - Thalmann algorithm – Mathematical model for diver decompression
  - Thermodynamic model of decompression – Early diving decompression model
  - Varying Permeability Model – Decompression model and algorithm based on bubble physics
