= Uncontrolled decompression =

Unplanned drop in the pressure of a sealed system

An uncontrolled decompression is an undesired drop in the pressure of a sealed system, such as a pressurised aircraft cabin or hyperbaric chamber, that typically results from human error, structural failure, or impact, causing the pressurised vessel to vent into its surroundings or fail to pressurize at all.

Such decompression may be classed as explosive, rapid, or slow:

- Explosive decompression (ED) is violent and too fast for air to escape safely from the lungs and other air-filled cavities in the body such as the sinuses and eustachian tubes, typically resulting in severe to fatal barotrauma.
- Rapid decompression may be slow enough to allow cavities to vent but may still cause serious barotrauma or discomfort.
- Slow or gradual decompression occurs so slowly that it may not be sensed before hypoxia sets in.

== Description ==
In this test chamber, air pressure drops suddenly to that of the atmosphere at 60,000 ft (18,000 m). Air humidity immediately condenses into fog, which within seconds evaporates back into gas.

The term uncontrolled decompression here refers to the unplanned depressurisation of vessels that are occupied by people; for example, a pressurised aircraft cabin at high altitude, a spacecraft, or a hyperbaric chamber. For the catastrophic failure of other pressure vessels used to contain gas, liquids, or reactants under pressure, the term explosion is more commonly used, or other specialised terms such as BLEVE may apply to particular situations.

Decompression can occur due to structural failure of the pressure vessel, or failure of the compression system itself. The speed and violence of the decompression is affected by the size of the pressure vessel, the differential pressure between the inside and outside of the vessel, and the size of the leak hole.

The US Federal Aviation Administration recognizes three distinct types of decompression events in aircraft: explosive, rapid, and gradual decompression.

=== Explosive decompression ===
Explosive decompression occurs typically in less than 0.1 to 0.5 seconds, a change in cabin pressure faster than the lungs can decompress. Normally, the time required to release air from the lungs without restrictions, such as masks, is 0.2 seconds. The risk of lung trauma is very high, as is the danger from any unsecured objects that can become projectiles because of the explosive force, which may be likened to a bomb detonation.

Immediately after an explosive decompression, a heavy fog may fill the aircraft cabin as the air cools, raising the relative humidity and causing sudden condensation. Military pilots with oxygen masks must pressure-breathe, whereby the lungs fill with air when relaxed, and effort has to be exerted to expel the air again.

=== Rapid decompression ===
Rapid decompression typically takes more than 0.1 to 0.5 seconds, allowing the lungs to decompress more quickly than the cabin. The risk of lung damage is still present, but significantly reduced compared with explosive decompression.

=== Gradual decompression ===
Slow, or gradual, decompression occurs slowly enough to go unnoticed and might only be detected by instruments. This type of decompression may also come about from a failure to pressurize the cabin as an aircraft climbs to altitude. An example of this is the 2005 Helios Airways Flight 522 crash, in which the maintenance service left the pressurization system in manual mode and the pilots did not check the mode selected. As a result, they (as well as most of the passengers and crew) suffered a loss of consciousness due to hypoxia (lack of oxygen). The plane continued to fly on autopilot and eventually crashed due to fuel exhaustion.

== Decompression injuries ==
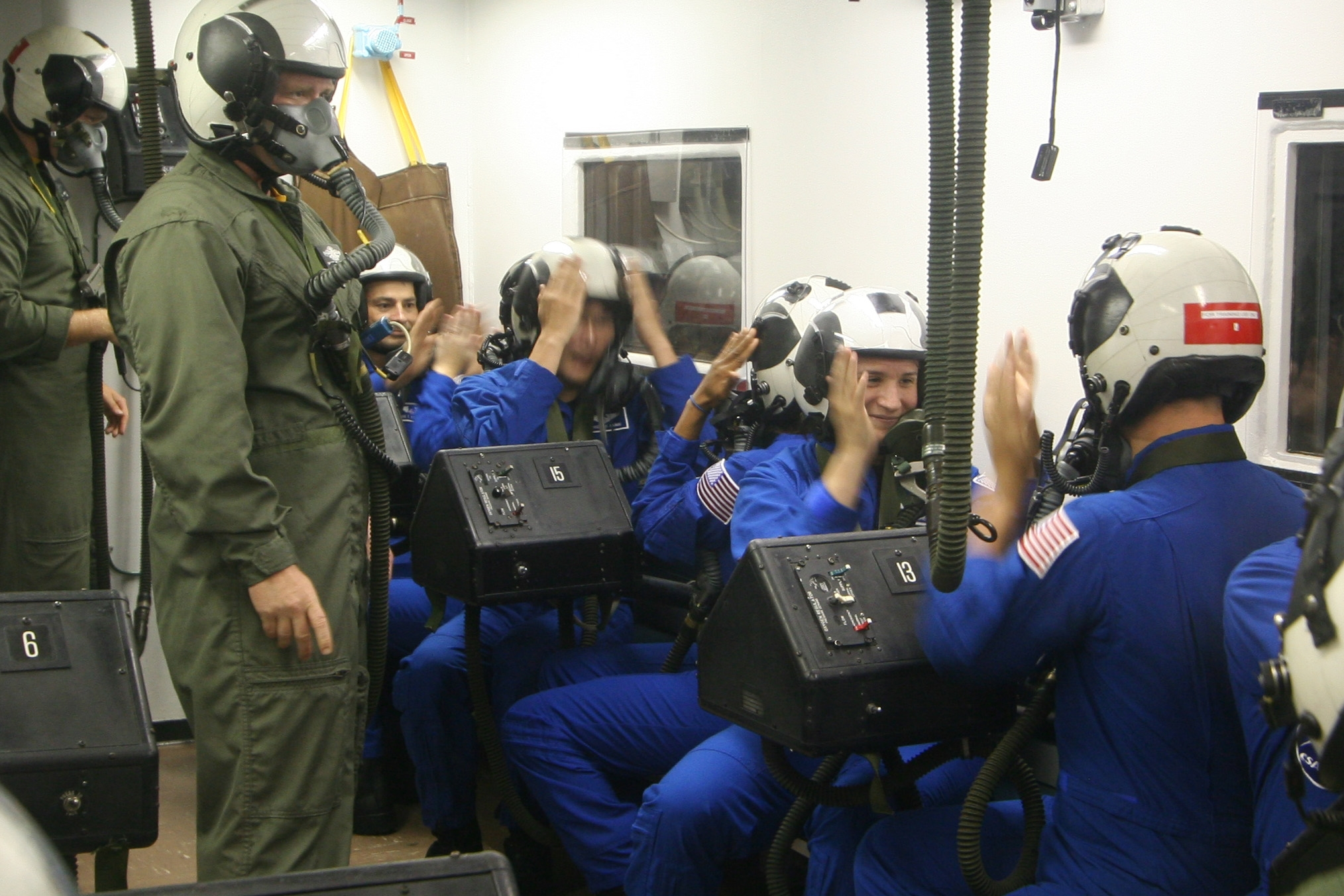
NASA astronaut candidates being monitored for signs of hypoxia during training in an altitude chamber

The following physical injuries may be associated with decompression incidents:

- Hypoxia is the most serious risk associated with decompression, especially as it may go undetected or incapacitate the aircrew.
- Barotrauma: an inability to equalize pressure in internal air spaces such as the middle ear or gastrointestinal tract, or more serious injury such as a burst lung
- Decompression sickness
- Altitude sickness
- Frostbite or hypothermia from exposure to freezing cold air at high altitude
- Physical trauma caused by the violence of explosive decompression, which can turn people and loose objects into projectiles

At least two confirmed cases have been documented of a person being sucked through an airplane passenger window. The first occurred in 1973 on National Airlines Flight 27 when debris from an engine failure struck a window roughly midway in the fuselage. Despite efforts to pull the passenger back into the airplane, the occupant was forced entirely through the cabin window. The second incident occurred on April 17, 2018, when a woman on Southwest Airlines Flight 1380 was partially sucked through an airplane passenger window that had broken from a similar engine failure. Although other passengers were able to pull her back inside, she later died from her injuries. In both incidents, the plane landed safely with the sole fatality being the person seated next to the window involved.

== Implications for aircraft design ==
Modern aircraft are specifically designed with longitudinal and circumferential reinforcing ribs in order to prevent localised damage from tearing the whole fuselage open during a decompression incident. However, decompression events have nevertheless proved fatal for aircraft in other ways. In 1974, explosive decompression onboard Turkish Airlines Flight 981 caused the floor to collapse, severing vital flight control cables in the process. The FAA issued an Airworthiness Directive the following year requiring manufacturers of aircraft to strengthen the structure or install vent flaps so that they could withstand the effects of in-flight decompression caused by an opening of up to 20 square feet (2 m^{2}) in the lower deck cargo compartment. Manufacturers were able to comply with the Directive either by strengthening the floors and/or installing relief vents called "dado panels" between the passenger cabin and the cargo compartment.

Cabin doors are designed to prevent losing cabin pressure through them by making it nearly impossible to open them in flight, whether accidentally or intentionally. The plug door design ensures that when the pressure inside the cabin exceeds the pressure outside, the doors are forced shut and will not open until the pressure is equalized. Cabin doors, including the emergency exits, but not all cargo doors, open inwards, or must first be pulled inwards and then rotated before they can be pushed out through the door frame because at least one dimension of the door is larger than the door frame. Pressurization prevented the doors of Saudia Flight 163 from being opened on the ground after the aircraft made a successful emergency landing, resulting in the deaths of all 287 passengers and 14 crew members from fire and smoke.

Prior to 1996, approximately 6,000 large commercial transport airplanes were type certified to fly up to 45,000 feet (14,000 m), without being required to meet special conditions related to flight at high altitude. In 1996, the FAA adopted Amendment 25–87, which imposed additional high-altitude cabin-pressure specifications, for new designs of aircraft types. For aircraft certified to operate above 25,000 feet (FL 250; 7,600 m), it "must be designed so that occupants will not be exposed to cabin pressure altitudes in excess of 15,000 feet [4,600 m] after any probable failure condition in the pressurization system." In the event of a decompression which results from "any failure condition not shown to be extremely improbable," the aircraft must be designed so that occupants will not be exposed to a cabin altitude exceeding 25,000 feet (7,600 m) for more than 2 minutes, nor exceeding an altitude of 40,000 feet (12,000 m) at any time. In practice, that new FAR amendment imposes an operational ceiling of 40,000 feet on the majority of newly designed commercial aircraft. (Note: Notable exceptions include the Airbus A380, Boeing 787, and Concorde.)

In 2004, Airbus successfully petitioned the FAA to allow cabin pressure of the A380 to reach 43,000 feet (13,000 m) in the event of a decompression incident and to exceed 40,000 feet (12,000 m) for one minute. This special exemption allows the A380 to operate at a higher altitude than other newly designed civilian aircraft, which have not yet been granted a similar exemption.

== International standards ==
The Depressurization Exposure Integral (DEI) is a quantitative model that is used by the FAA to enforce compliance with decompression-related design directives. The model relies on the fact that the pressure that the subject is exposed to and the duration of that exposure are the two most important variables at play in a decompression event.

Other national and international standards for explosive decompression testing include:

- MIL-STD-810, 202
- RTCA/DO-160
- NORSOK M710
- API 17K and 17J
- NACE TM0192 and TM0297
- TOTALELFFINA SP TCS 142 Appendix H

== Notable decompression accidents and incidents ==
Decompression incidents are not uncommon on military and civilian aircraft, with approximately 40–50 rapid decompression events occurring worldwide annually. However, in most cases the problem is manageable, injuries or structural damage rare and the incident not considered notable. One notable case was Southwest Airlines Flight 1380 in 2018, where an uncontained engine failure ruptured a window, causing a passenger to be partially blown out.

Decompression incidents do not occur solely in aircraft; the Byford Dolphin accident is an example of violent explosive decompression of a saturation diving system on an oil rig. A decompression event is often the result of a failure caused by another problem (such as an explosion or mid-air collision), but the decompression event may worsen the initial issue.

Event	Date	Pressure vessel	Event type	Fatalities/number on board	Decompression type	Cause
Pan Am Flight 201	1952	Boeing 377 Stratocruiser	Accident	1/27	Explosive decompression	Passenger door blew out after lock failure
BOAC Flight 781	1954	de Havilland Comet 1	Accident	35/35	Explosive decompression	Metal fatigue
South African Airways Flight 201	1954	de Havilland Comet 1	Accident	21/21	Explosive decompression	Metal fatigue
TWA Flight 2	1956	Lockheed L-1049 Super Constellation	Accident	70/70	Explosive decompression	Mid-air collision
American Airlines Flight 87	1957	Douglas DC-7	Accident	0/46	Explosive decompression	Propeller blade separated and hit fuselage
Air France F-BGNE	1957	Lockheed Super Constellation	Accident	1/?	Explosive decompression	Window shattered at 18,000 feet (5,500 m)
Continental Airlines Flight 11	1962	Boeing 707-100	Bombing	45/45	Explosive decompression	Insurance fraud suicide bomb
Aerolineas Argentinas Flight 737	1962	Avro 748-105 Srs. 1	Accident	1/34	Explosive decompression	Aft left passenger door separated from airplane
Volsk parachute jump accident	1962	Pressure suit	Accident	1/1	Rapid decompression	Collision with gondola upon jumping from balloon
Cambrian Airways G-AMON	1964	Vickers 701 Viscount	Accident	0/63	Explosive decompression	Propeller blade separated and hit fuselage
Strato Jump III	1966	Pressure suit	Accident	1/1	Rapid decompression	Pressure suit failure
Apollo program spacesuit testing accident	1966	Apollo A7L spacesuit (or possibly a prototype of it)	Accident	0/1	Rapid decompression	Oxygen line coupling failure
Northeast Airlines N8224H	1967	Douglas DC-6B	Accident	0/14	Explosive decompression	Fuselage cracked open from fatigue
USAF 59-0530	1970	Douglas C-133B Cargomaster	Accident	5/5	Explosive decompression	Existing crack expanded, leading to fuselage failure
Hughes Airwest Flight 706	1971	McDonnell Douglas DC-9-31	Accident	49/49	Explosive decompression	Mid-air Collision
Soyuz 11 re-entry	1971	Soyuz spacecraft	Accident	3/3	Rapid decompression	Pressure equalisation valve damaged by faulty pyrotechnic separation charges
BEA Flight 706	1971	Vickers Vanguard	Accident	63/63	Explosive decompression	Structural failure of rear pressure bulkhead due to corrosion
JAT Flight 367	1972	McDonnell Douglas DC-9-32	Terrorist bombing	27/28	Explosive decompression	Bomb explosion in cargo hold
American Airlines Flight 96	1972	Douglas DC-10-10	Accident	0/67	Rapid decompression	Cargo door failure
Aeroflot Flight 109	1973	Tuploev Tu-104B	Bombing	81/81	Explosive decompression	Hijacker detonated explosive
National Airlines Flight 27	1973	Douglas DC-10-10	Accident	1/128	Explosive decompression	Uncontained engine failure
Turkish Airlines Flight 981	1974	Douglas DC-10-10	Accident	346/346	Explosive decompression	Cargo door failure
USAF (registration unknown)	1974	Boeing KC-135 Stratotanker	Accident	1/33	Explosive decompression	Small window broke at 35,000 feet
TWA Flight 841	1974	Boeing 707-331B	Terrorist bombing	88/88	Explosive decompression	Bomb explosion in cargo hold
1975 Tân Sơn Nhứt C-5 accident	1975	Lockheed C-5 Galaxy	Accident	138/314	Explosive decompression	Improper maintenance of rear doors, cargo door failure
British Airways Flight 476	1976	Hawker Siddeley Trident 3B	Accident	63/63	Explosive decompression	Mid-air collision
Korean Air Lines Flight 902	1978	Boeing 707-320B	Shootdown	2/109	Explosive decompression	Shootdown after straying into prohibited airspace over the Soviet Union
Air Canada Flight 680	1979	McDonnell Douglas DC-9-32	Accident	0/45	Explosive decompression	Fuselage tore open from fatigue
Itavia Flight 870	1980	McDonnell Douglas DC-9-15	Bombing or Shootdown (Disputed)	81/81	Explosive decompression	Mid-air breakup due to explosion in the cabin (Cause of explosion disputed)
Saudia Flight 162	1980	Lockheed L-1011 TriStar	Accident	2/292	Explosive decompression	Tyre blowout
Far Eastern Air Transport Flight 103	1981	Boeing 737-222	Accident	110/110	Explosive decompression	Severe corrosion and metal fatigue
British Airways Flight 009	1982	Boeing 747-200	Accident	0/263	Gradual decompression	Engine flameout due to volcanic ash ingestion
Reeve Aleutian Airways Flight 8	1983	Lockheed L-188 Electra	Accident	0/15	Rapid decompression	Propeller failure and collision with fuselage
Korean Air Lines Flight 007	1983	Boeing 747-200B	Shootdown	269/269	Rapid decompression	Intentionally fired air-to-air missile after aircraft strayed into prohibited airspace over the Soviet Union
Gulf Air Flight 771	1983	Boeing 737-200	Terrorist bombing	112/112	Explosive decompression	Bomb explosion in cargo hold
Byford Dolphin accident	1983	Diving bell	Accident	5/6	Explosive decompression	Human error, no fail-safe in the design
Air India Flight 182	1985	Boeing 747-200B	Terrorist bombing	329/329	Explosive decompression	Bomb explosion in cargo hold
Japan Airlines Flight 123	1985	Boeing 747SR	Accident	520/524	Explosive decompression	Delayed structural failure of the rear pressure bulkhead following improper repairs
Space Shuttle Challenger disaster	1986	Space Shuttle Challenger	Accident	7/7	Gradual or rapid decompression	Breach in solid rocket booster O-ring, leading to damage from escaping superheated gas and eventual disintegration of launch vehicle
Pan Am Flight 125	1987	Boeing 747-121	Incident	0/245	Rapid decompression	Cargo door malfunction
LOT Polish Airlines Flight 5055	1987	Ilyushin Il-62M	Accident	183/183	Rapid decompression	Uncontained engine failure
Aloha Airlines Flight 243	1988	Boeing 737-200	Accident	1/95	Explosive decompression	Metal fatigue
Iran Air Flight 655	1988	Airbus A300B2-203	Shootdown	290/290	Explosive decompression	Intentionally fired surface-to-air missiles from USS Vincennes
Pan Am Flight 103	1988	Boeing 747-100	Terrorist bombing	259/259	Explosive decompression	Bomb explosion in cargo hold
United Airlines Flight 811	1989	Boeing 747-122	Accident	9/355	Explosive decompression	Cargo door failure
Partnair Flight 394	1989	Convair CV-580	Accident	55/55	Explosive decompression	Rudder malfunction due to maintenance error, leading to loss of control and in-flight breakup
UTA Flight 772	1989	Douglas DC-10-30	Terrorist bombing	170/170	Explosive decompression	Bomb explosion in cargo hold
Avianca Flight 203	1989	Boeing 727-21	Terrorist bombing	107/107	Explosive decompression	Bomb explosion igniting vapours in an empty fuel tank
British Airways Flight 5390	1990	BAC One-Eleven	Incident	0/87	Rapid decompression	Cockpit windscreen failure
Copa Airlines Flight 201	1992	Boeing 737-200 Advanced	Accident	47/47	Explosive decompression	Spatial disorientation leading to steep dive and mid-air breakup
China Northwest Airlines Flight 2303	1994	Tupolev TU-154M	Accident	160/160	Explosive decompression	Improper maintenance
Delta Air Lines Flight 157	1995	Lockheed L-1011 TriStar	Accident	0/236	Rapid decompression	Structural failure of the bulkhead following inadequate inspection of the airframe
TWA Flight 800	1996	Boeing 747-100	Accident	230/230	Explosive decompression	Vapour explosion in fuel tank
Progress M-34 docking test	1997	Spektr space station module	Accident	0/3	Rapid decompression	Collision while in orbit
TAM Airlines Flight 283	1997	Fokker 100	Bombing	1/60	Explosive decompression	Bomb explosion
SilkAir Flight 185	1997	Boeing 737-300	(Disputed)	104/104	Explosive decompression	Steep dive and mid-air breakup (Cause of crash disputed)
Lionair Flight 602	1998	Antonov An-24RV	Shootdown	55/55	Rapid decompression	Probable MANPAD shootdown
1999 South Dakota Learjet crash	1999	Learjet 35	Accident	6/6	Gradual or rapid decompression	(Undetermined)
EgyptAir Flight 990	1999	Boeing 767-300ER	(Disputed)	217/217	Explosive decompression	Uncontrollable dive leading to mid-air breakup (Cause of crash disputed)
2000 Australia Beechcraft King Air crash	2000	Beechcraft Super King Air	Accident	8/8	Gradual decompression	Inconclusive; likely pilot error or mechanical failure
American Airlines Flight 1291	2000	Airbus A300-600R	Accident	1/133	Rapid decompression	Cabin outflow valve malfunction.
Hainan Island incident	2001	Lockheed EP-3	Accident	1/25	Rapid decompression	Mid-air collision
TAM Airlines Flight 9755	2001	Fokker 100	Accident	1/88	Rapid decompression	Uncontained engine failure
China Airlines Flight 611	2002	Boeing 747-200B	Accident	225/225	Explosive decompression	Metal fatigue
2003 Ukrainian Cargo Airways Il-76 accident	2003	Ilyushin Il-76	Accident	Unknown (Note: The number of passengers aboard Ilyushin Il-76 ranged from 160 to 350+. Depending on the source there were 17 to 200 survivors.)	Explosive decompression	Rear loading ramp disintegration from aircraft while cruising leading to explosive decompression
Space Shuttle Columbia disaster	2003	Space Shuttle Columbia	Accident	7/7	Explosive decompression	Damage to orbiter thermal protection system at liftoff, leading to disintegration during reentry
Pinnacle Airlines Flight 3701	2004	Bombardier CRJ-200	Accident	2/2	Gradual decompression	Engine flameout caused by pilot error
Helios Airways Flight 522	2005	Boeing 737-300	Accident	121/121	Gradual decompression	Pressurization system set to manual for the entire flight
Alaska Airlines Flight 536	2005	McDonnell Douglas MD-80	Incident	0/142	Rapid decompression	Failure of operator to report collision involving a baggage loading cart at the departure gate
Adam Air Flight 574	2007	Boeing 737-400	Accident	102/102	Explosive decompression	Spatial disorientation leading to steep dive and mid-air breakup
Qantas Flight 30	2008	Boeing 747-400	Incident	0/365	Rapid decompression	Fuselage ruptured by oxygen cylinder explosion
Southwest Airlines Flight 2294	2009	Boeing 737-300	Incident	0/131	Rapid decompression	Metal fatigue
Southwest Airlines Flight 812	2011	Boeing 737-300	Incident	0/123	Rapid decompression	Metal fatigue
Malaysia Airlines Flight 17	2014	Boeing 777-200ER	Shootdown	298/298	Explosive decompression	Shot down over Ukraine
Daallo Airlines Flight 159	2016	Airbus A321	Terrorist bombing	1/81	Explosive decompression	Bomb explosion in passenger cabin
Southwest Airlines Flight 1380	2018	Boeing 737-700	Accident	1/148	Rapid decompression	Uncontained engine failure caused by metal fatigue
Sichuan Airlines Flight 8633	2018	Airbus A319-100	Accident	0/128	Explosive decompression	Cockpit windscreen failure
2022 Baltic Sea Cessna Citation crash	2022	Cessna Citation II	Accident	4/4	Gradual decompression	Under investigation
2023 Virginia Cessna Citation crash	2023	Cessna Citation V	Accident	4/4	Unknown decompression	Inconclusive; possibly incomplete maintenance (Note: While incomplete maintenance was a factor, the NTSB was unable to determine what could have caused the aircraft to depressurize.)
Alaska Airlines Flight 1282	2024	Boeing 737 MAX 9	Accident	0/177	Explosive decompression	Loss of incorrectly installed door plug

== Myths ==
=== A bullet through a window may cause explosive decompression ===
In 2004, the TV show MythBusters examined whether explosive decompression occurs when a bullet is fired through the fuselage of an airplane informally by way of several tests using a decommissioned pressurised DC-9. A single shot through the side or the window did not have any effect – it took actual explosives to cause explosive decompression – suggesting that the fuselage is designed to prevent people from being blown out. Professional pilot David Lombardo states that a bullet hole would have no perceived effect on cabin pressure as the hole would be smaller than the opening of the aircraft's outflow valve.

However, NASA scientist Geoffrey A. Landis points out that the impact depends on the size of the hole, which can be expanded by debris that is blown through it. Landis went on to say that it would take about 100 seconds for pressure to equalise through a roughly 30 cm (12 in) hole in the fuselage of a Boeing 747. He then stated that anyone sitting next to the hole would have about half a ton of force pulling them towards it. Fictional accounts of this include a scene in Goldfinger, when James Bond kills the eponymous villain by blowing him out a passenger window and Die Another Day, when an errant gunshot shatters a window on a cargo plane and rapidly expands, causing multiple enemy officials, henchmen and the main villain to be blown out to their deaths.

=== Exposure to a vacuum causes the body to explode ===
This persistent myth is based on a failure to distinguish between two types of decompression and their exaggerated portrayal in some fictional works. The first type of decompression deals with changing from normal atmospheric pressure (one atmosphere) to a vacuum (zero atmosphere) which is usually centered around space exploration. The second type of decompression changes from exceptionally high pressure (many atmospheres) to normal atmospheric pressure (one atmosphere) as may occur in deep-sea diving.

The first type is more common as pressure reduction from normal atmospheric pressure to a vacuum can be found in both space exploration and high-altitude aviation. Research and experience have shown that while exposure to a vacuum causes swelling, human skin is tough enough to withstand the drop of one atmosphere. The most serious risk from vacuum exposure is hypoxia, in which the body is starved of oxygen, leading to unconsciousness within a few seconds. Rapid uncontrolled decompression can be much more dangerous than vacuum exposure itself. Even if the victim does not hold their breath, venting through the windpipe may be too slow to prevent the fatal rupture of the delicate alveoli of the lungs. Eardrums and sinuses may also be ruptured by rapid decompression, and soft tissues may be affected by bruises seeping blood. If the victim somehow survived, the stress and shock would accelerate oxygen consumption, leading to hypoxia at a rapid rate. At the extremely low pressures encountered at altitudes above about 63,000 feet (19,000 m), the boiling point of water becomes less than normal body temperature. This measure of altitude is known as the Armstrong limit, which is the practical limit to survivable altitude without pressurization. Fictional accounts of bodies exploding due to exposure from a vacuum include, among others, several incidents in the movie Outland, while in the movie Total Recall, characters appear to suffer effects of ebullism and blood boiling when exposed to the atmosphere of Mars.

The second type is rare since it involves a pressure drop over several atmospheres, which would require the person to have been placed in a pressure vessel. The only likely situation in which this might occur is during decompression after deep-sea diving. A pressure drop as small as 100 Torr (13 kPa), which produces no symptoms if it is gradual, may be fatal if it occurs suddenly. One such incident occurred in 1983 in the North Sea, where violent explosive decompression from nine atmospheres to one caused four divers to die instantly from massive and lethal barotrauma. Dramatized fictional accounts of this include a scene from the film Licence to Kill, when a character's head explodes after his hyperbaric chamber is rapidly depressurized, and another in the film DeepStar Six, wherein rapid depressurization causes a character to hemorrhage profusely before exploding in a similar fashion.

== See also ==
- Decompression (altitude) – Reduction in ambient pressure due to ascent above sea level
- Decompression (diving) – Pressure reduction and its effects during ascent from depth
- Decompression (physics) – Reduction of pressure or compression
- Time of useful consciousness – Duration of effective performance in a hypoxic environment
