= Ebullism =

Formation of vapour bubbles in bodily fluids due to reduced environmental pressure

- Other names: Ebullism syndrome
- Specialty: Emergency medicine
- Symptoms: Bubbling in the eyes and mouth, edema, bruising, loss of consciousness
- Complications: Anoxemia, decompression sickness, barotrauma
- Causes: Exposure to ambient pressures below ~63 mbar

Ebullism is the formation of water vapour bubbles in bodily fluids due to reduced environmental pressure, usually at extreme high altitude. It occurs because a system of liquid and gas at equilibrium will see a net conversion of liquid to gas as pressure lowers; for example, liquids reach their boiling points at lower temperatures when the pressure on them is lowered. The injuries and disorder caused by ebullism is also known as ebullism syndrome. Ebullism will expand the volume of the tissues, but the vapour pressure of water at temperatures in which a human can survive is not sufficient to rupture skin or most other tissues encased in skin. Ebullism produces predictable injuries, which may be survivable if treated soon enough, and is often accompanied by complications caused by rapid decompression, such as decompression sickness and a variety of barotrauma injuries. Persons at risk are astronauts and high altitude aviators, for whom it is an occupational hazard.

== Signs and symptoms ==
Symptoms of ebullism include bubbles in the membranes of the mouth and eyes, swelling of the soft tissues with possible bruising, and bubbles in the blood. Blood circulation and breathing may be impaired or stopped by cardiac vapour lock. The brain tissue may be starved of oxygen due to blockage of arteries resulting in rapid loss of consciousness, and the lungs may swell and hemorrhage. Death results unless recompression is rapid enough to restore oxygenation and reduce the bubbles before excessive tissue damage occurs. Head exposure may result in freezing of the corneal surface of the eye, impairing vision. Other signs and symptoms of rapid decompression injury may also be present.

=== Complications ===
A decompression event leading to ebullism will cause acute anoxemia and is likely to cause other decompression injuries such as decompression sickness and possibly one or more forms of decompression barotrauma.

== Causes ==
In the atmospheric pressure present at sea level, water boils at 100 °C (212 °F). At an altitude of 63,000 feet (19,000 m), it boils at only 37 °C (99 °F), the normal body temperature of humans. This altitude is known as Armstrong's Line. Ebullism occurs when unprotected humans are exposed to altitudes above the Armstrong limit where the vapor pressure of tissues is less than the ambient pressure. In practice bodily fluids do not boil off continuously at this altitude because the skin and outer organs have enough strength to withstand the internal pressure, so the pressure inside the tissues would increase to match vapour pressure. Nitrogen dissolved in the tissues may also accumulate in the vapour bubbles causing altitude decompression sickness.

== Mechanism ==
Pathophysiology of ebullism has mostly been studied in animals, including large primates, but no reasons have been found to suggest that the results should not be extrapolated to humans. Experiments show that ebullism occurs non-uniformly at sites where conditions are most conducive to vapourisation of water and outgassing of nitrogen. Factors include temperature, hydrostatic pressure, tissue elasticity, solute concentration, and the presence of gas bubble nuclei, which can cause vapour bubbles to form at pressures slightly above the theoretical ambient pressure of 47 millimetres of mercury (63 mbar) in some places such as the pleural cavity, where the pressure can drop below ambient, and large central veins where hydrostatic pressure is minimum and blood temperature is at a maximum.

== Diagnosis ==
Ebullism occurs as a consequence of exposure to ambient pressures below about 47 millimetres of mercury (63 mbar). At higher pressures similar symptoms are likely to be caused by decompression sickness and some forms of barotrauma.

== Prevention ==
To prevent ebullism, tissues must be kept under sufficient pressure that vaporisation of the aqueous constituents is not possible in the range of temperature those tissues may experience.

An effective strategy for preventing ebullism would include multiple redundant levels of protection against decompression, and systems allowing non-catastrophic failure with sufficient time of useful consciousness to take effective countermeasures. Several mitigating strategies have associated hazards of their own. A high concentration of oxygen in the breathing gas reduces the severity of decompression sickness complications and may increase the duration of useful consciousness, but at the same time increases fire hazard. A low initial pressure reduces decompression rate and severity in a catastrophic decompression, which reduces the risk of barotrauma but gives a lower margin of safety in a slow decompression, and can increase the risk of decompression sickness. Outside of a pressurised cabin environment, a pressure suit is the usual protective measure, and is the definitive protection in decompression to vacuum, but they are expensive, heavy, bulky, restrict mobility, cause thermal regulatory problems, and reduce comfort.

== Treatment ==
Immediate recompression to a pressure at minimum pressure for effective oxygenation is necessary for survival in whole-body exposure, along with re-oxygenation. Continued or additional pressurisation where necessary to prevent or treat decompression sickness is also indicated.

High-frequency percussive ventilation is recommended by Murray et al (2013) for respiratory support as atelectasis is likely.

Initial field evaluation would be similar to trauma assessment. It may be necessary to remove a pressure suit to give access for primary and secondary surveys. Airway, breathing, and circulation are immediate priorities, followed by assessment of level of consciousness. Intubation is indicated if unconscious and deteriorating. If a pulse cannot be distinguished, and the person is unresponsive, cardiopulmonary resuscitation should be started immediately, with advanced cardiac life support and cardiovascular monitoring as soon as possible.

Little information is available on the effectiveness of conventional treatment, such as hyperbaric oxygen, or adjunctive therapies, for injuries due to ebullism. Spontaneous recovery has occurred in cases where recompression was applied with minimal delay, or the damage was restricted to parts of the limbs. Other examples were fatal.

== Outcomes ==
Ebullism produces secondary tissue damage which, when extensive, has generally been considered fatal due to limited availability of treatment options on site.

The time needed for recovery will depend on the severity of injury, which is largely dependent on the severity and duration of exposure. The main predictor of survival is the establishment of sufficient circulation and breathing.

== Epidemiology ==
Ebullism risk is associated with spaceflight, particularly EVA accidents, rapid decompression of aircraft at very high altitudes, and pressure suit failure during flight and training exercises.

== Society and culture ==
In 1960, Joseph Kittinger experienced localised ebullism during a 31 kilometres (19 mi) ascent in a helium-supported gondola. His right-hand glove failed to pressurise and his hand expanded to roughly twice its normal volume accompanied by disabling pain. His hand took about three hours to recover after his return to the ground.

Tissue samples from the remains of the crew of Space Shuttle STS-107 Columbia revealed evidence of ebullism. Given the level of tissue damage, the crew could not have regained consciousness even with re-pressurization.

== Etymology ==
The term space ebullism was introduced by Captain Julian E. Ward in his paper "The True Nature of the Boiling of Body Fluids in Space", published in Aviation Medicine in October 1956. It was suggested "because the word ebullism does not connote the addition of heat to produce vapor." It comes from the Latin ebullire, meaning "to bubble out, or to boil up."

== See also ==
- Effect of spaceflight on the human body – Medical issues associated with spaceflight
- High altitude breathing apparatus – Equipment which allows the user to breathe at hypoxic altitudes
- Physiology of decompression – Physiological basis for decompression theory and practice
- Space suit – Garment worn to protect a human in space
- Uncontrolled decompression – Unplanned drop in the pressure of a sealed system
