= Time of useful consciousness =

Duration of effective performance in a hypoxic environment

Time of useful consciousness (TUC), also effective performance time (EPT), is defined as the amount of time an individual is able to function effectively (e.g. perform flying duties) in an environment of inadequate oxygen supply. It is the period of time from the interruption of the oxygen supply or exposure to an oxygen-poor environment to the time when useful function is lost, and the individual is no longer capable of taking proper corrective and protective action. It is not the time to total unconsciousness. At the higher altitudes, the TUC becomes very short; considering this danger, the emphasis is on prevention rather than cure.

For orbital altitudes and above, that is, direct exposure to space, 6–8 seconds of consciousness is expected.

== Medical analysis and variations ==
There are many individual variations of hypoxia, even within the same person. Generally, old age tends to reduce the efficiency of the pulmonary system, and can cause the onset of hypoxia symptoms sooner. Smoking drastically reduces oxygen intake efficiency, and can have the effect of reducing tolerance by 1,000–2,000 metres (3,300–6,600 ft). Hypoxia can be produced in a hypobaric chamber. This can be useful for identifying individual symptoms of hypoxia, along with rough estimates of the altitude that causes problems for each person. Identifying symptoms is often helpful for self-diagnosis in order to realize when altitude should be reduced.

The table below shows average TUCs as documented by the Federal Aviation Administration; a rapid ascent results in a lower TUC. The TUCs for any given individual may differ significantly from this. Aerobic exercise during the TUC period will reduce the TUCs considerably; so will exercise immediately prior to the TUC as this induces an oxygen debt prior to exposure.

Altitude (measured barometrically)	TUC (normal ascent)	TUC (rapid decompression)
FL180 (18,000 ft; 5,500 m)	20 to 30 minutes	10 to 15 minutes
FL220 (22,000 ft; 6,700 m)	10 minutes	5 minutes
FL250 (25,000 ft; 7,600 m)	3 to 5 minutes	1.5 to 3.5 minutes
FL280 (28,000 ft; 8,550 m)	2.5 to 3 minutes	1.25 to 1.5 minutes
FL300 (30,000 ft; 9,150 m)	1 to 2 minutes	30 to 60 seconds
FL350 (35,000 ft; 10,650 m)	30 to 60 seconds	15 to 30 seconds
FL400 (40,000 ft; 12,200 m)	15 to 20 seconds	7 to 10 seconds
FL430 (43,000 ft; 13,100 m)	9 to 12 seconds	5 to 6 seconds
FL500 (50,000 ft; 15,250 m)	8 to 10 seconds	5 seconds

== See also ==
- Armstrong limit maximum survivable altitude
- Cabin pressurization
- Pressure suit
- Uncontrolled decompression
