= Mika LaVaque-Manty =

American philosopher

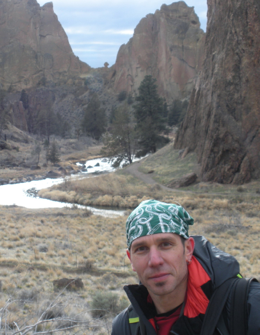
- LaVaque-Manty in 2014
- Born: 1966 (age 59–60)
- Other name: Mika LaVaque-Mänty

Education
- Education: University of Michigan (PhD in philosophy), University of Southern California (BA in philosophy)
- Thesis: No Secret Agents: A Liberal Theory of Political Action (1998)
- Doctoral advisor: Elizabeth S. Anderson
- Other advisors: Stephen Darwall, Don Herzog, David Hills, Peter Railton

Philosophical work
- Era: 21st-century philosophy
- Region: Western philosophy
- Institutions: University of Michigan
- Main interests: political philosophy

Mika LaVaque-Manty (born 1966) is an American political scientist and Arthur F. Thurnau Professor and associate professor at the University of Michigan. He is known for his works on liberal theory and Immanuel Kant and is a winner of the 2010 University of Michigan Press Book Award.

LaVaque-Manty moved to the United States from Finland in 1986.

== Books ==
- Arguments and Fists: Political Agency and Justification in Liberal Theory. Routledge 2002
- The Playing Fields of Eton: Equality and Excellence in Modern Meritocracy, University of Michigan Press 2009
- Writing in Political Science: A Very Brief Guide, with Danielle LaVaque-Manty. Oxford University Press 2015
