= Hypobaric chamber =

Chamber for simulating high altitude

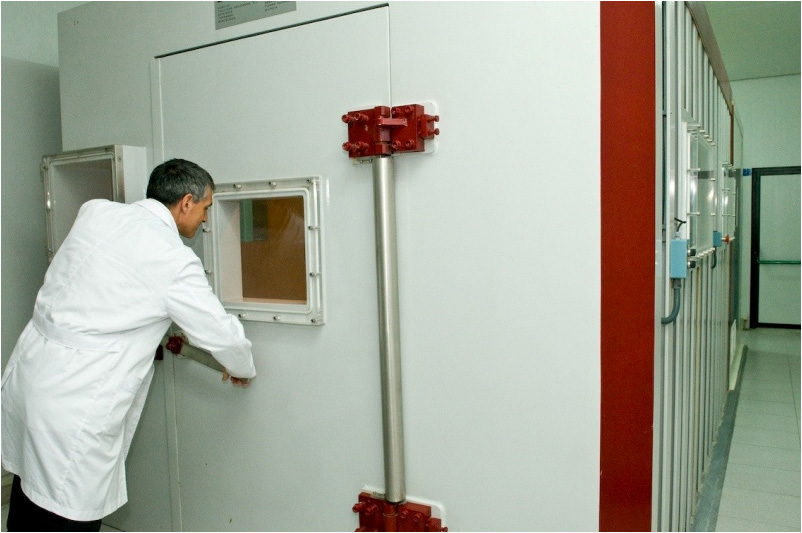
Hypobaric chamber at the Biopol'H, in Catalonia (Spain), used with patients and athletes who need treatment or training with reduced atmospheric pressure

A hypobaric chamber, or altitude chamber, is a chamber used during aerospace or high terrestrial altitude research or training to simulate the effects of high altitude on the human body, especially hypoxia (low oxygen) and hypobaria (low ambient air pressure). Some chambers also control for temperature and relative humidity.

== Procedure ==
One or more subjects (usually, pilots or crew members, though anyone interested in the effects of high altitude can usually arrange a visit) are placed in the chamber. Before "ascending" to the desired altitude, subjects breathe oxygen from oxygen masks to purge nitrogen from their bloodstream so decompression sickness (DCS) does not occur. With masks in place, the atmospheric pressure inside the chamber is then reduced to simulate altitudes of up to tens of thousands of feet. The subjects then remove their oxygen masks and experience the symptoms of hypoxia. An inside safety observer, breathing oxygen by mask, should always be present to place a subject's mask back on in the event a subject passes out unconscious. Outside observers monitor the subjects' condition via closed circuit television and viewing ports.

While the masks are off, subjects may be asked to do trivial tasks, such as arithmetic and signing their own names. When such tasks start taking excessive lengths of time to be done or are done poorly, it is usually a sign that the "time of useful consciousness" has been exceeded and that the masks should be replaced. Subjects may also ensure that they are able to do tasks such as clear their nose and sinuses easily, as pain from such problems can be a major distraction in an emergency such as rapid decompression.

== Use in training ==
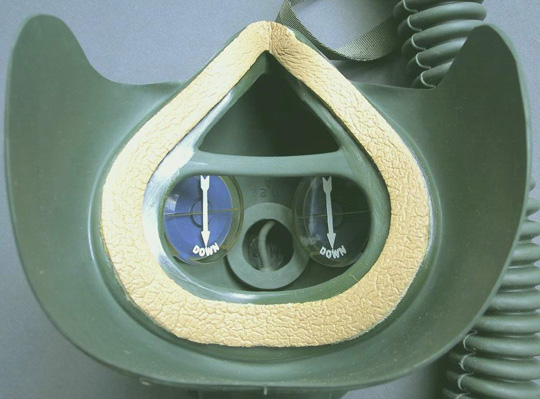
Aviator's oxygen mask

The primary purpose of the altitude chamber is for the subjects to learn what their hypoxia symptoms are. The symptoms of hypoxia are different for each individual, and this training is helpful for aviators to be able to recognize these symptoms during actual flight so as to avoid in-flight oxygen emergencies. Military pilots who fly aircraft at altitudes in excess of 10,000 feet, and civilian pilots who fly unpressurized aircraft above 12,500 feet, must use oxygen equipment. Altitude chamber training is required of U.S. military aviators every five years. The FAA and some larger airlines also require their pilots to periodically take altitude chamber training. Anyone with a pilot certificate in the United States who has a current Class I or Class II medical certificate can normally sign up and receive altitude training from several commercial facilities and a very limited availability from a government facility.

There are many procedures followed during chamber training for aircrew. Usually new aircrew will undergo a familiarization profile, where the chamber ascends to an altitude of 10,000 ft. During the ascent they are instructed on the proper procedure to clear the ears. During ascent, students are asked to yawn and on descent they need to perform the valsalva maneuver. If they perform the valsalva during ascent, they risk suffering barotrauma of the ear. This is because the ears are susceptible to Boyle's law.

There are also other profiles, such a hypoxia training profile, where the chamber ascends to an altitude of 25,000 ft. Upon arriving at 25,000 ft, students are removed from their oxygen supply two at a time, for around 2 to 3 minutes. During this time, they will be asked to complete simple tasks such as copying shapes on a piece of paper. They are asked during the time off oxygen how they feel. After being placed back on oxygen, they will understand how their judgement was impaired during the time that they were experiencing hypoxia.

The training goes further with rapid decompression profiles, where the chamber is very rapidly ascended from 8,000 ft to 22,000 ft within 10 to 20 seconds, to simulate the loss of a cabin door. For fighter pilots this is done from an altitude of 25,000 ft to 43,000 ft within 5 seconds which simulates the loss of a fighter aircraft's canopy.

Hypobaric chambers are also finding increasing use as a means of improving athletic performance. Since the human body adapts to extended mild hypoxia by increasing the quantity of red cells in the blood and this raises aerobic performance, athletes sleep in them as part of their training regimen. This has roughly the same effect as training in high altitudes, but the use of hypobaric chambers plays into the controversial issue of enhanced athletic performance. Mika LaVaque-Manty asks in his book, "Are hypobaric chambers, which simulate high-altitude conditions, a natural way to improve your body?" This hints that the hypobaric chambers use can be likened to blood doping and thus be deemed an unfair athletic advantage. This could lead to a ban on hypobaric chambers for athletic training.

== Institutions with hypobaric chambers ==
- terraXcube, Eurac Research, accredited laboratory for environmental testing with large climatic chambers and medical clinic
- Centro de Medicina Aeroespacial de la Fuerza Aerea Colombiana, Aviation medicine, physiological, and hypobaric services
- Royal New Zealand Air Force Aviation Medicine Unit , Aviation medicine training and hypobaric services
- U.S. Army Institute of Environmental Medicine, Natick, MA, 33 years experience with its Hypobaric Chamber Facility
- Sheppard Air Force Base in Wichita Falls, Texas
- University of North Dakota's John D. Odegard School of Aerospace Sciences, Aviation Training
- Naval Operational Medicine Institute, Operational medical and survival training and consultative services to military forces worldwide
- Arizona State University Polytechnic Campus, Aircrew training, research, and other uses
- National AeroSpace Training And Research (NASTAR) Center South, Air and space training, research, and education
- RAF Centre of Aviation Medicine
- Center for Man in Aviation, Royal Netherlands Air Force, Aircrew training, physiology, research and certification of equipment
- University Hospitals Cleveland Medical Center in Cleveland, Ohio, aerospace physiology research
- AXA Training Center, Training ground of Liverpool F.C.

== See also ==
- Hyperbaric chamber – in contrast to hypobaric chambers, a hyperbaric chamber places subjects under increased atmospheric pressure or increased oxygen saturation, or both, for purposes including improved wound healing.
