= Armstrong limit =

Altitude above which water boils at body temperature

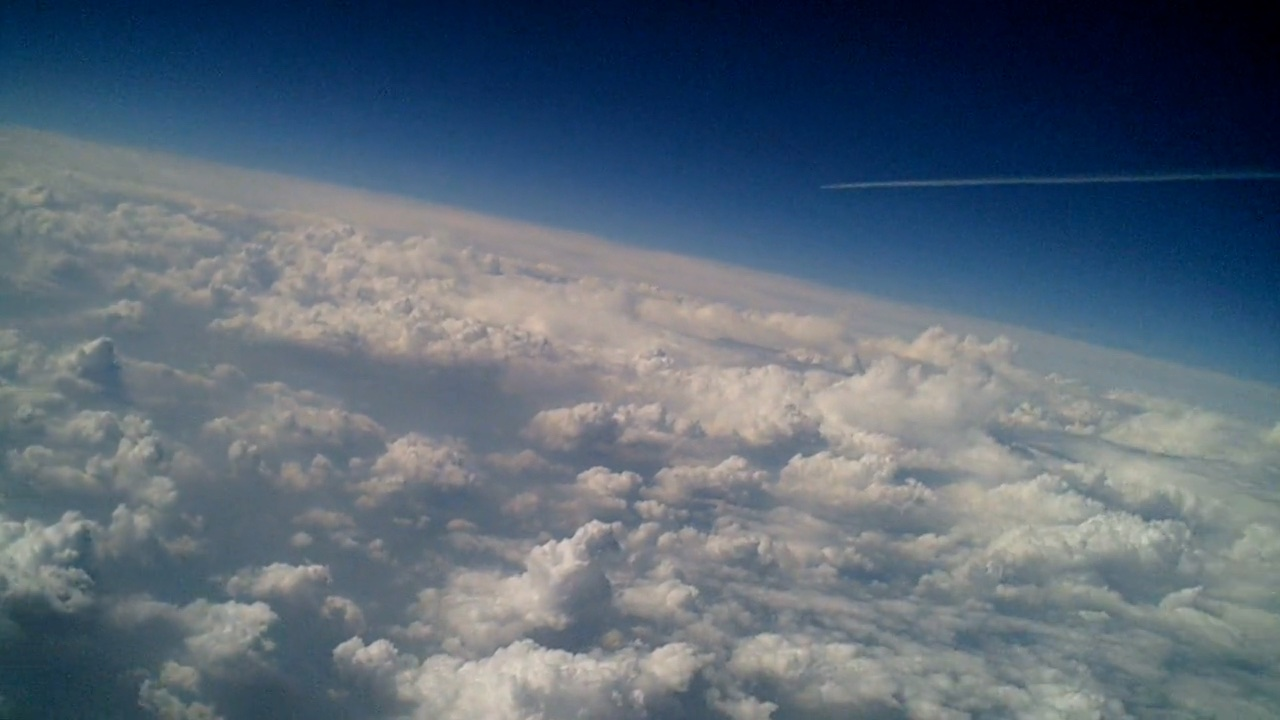
The Armstrong limit is above most of Earth's atmosphere.

The Armstrong limit, also called Armstrong's line, is a measure of altitude above which atmospheric pressure is sufficiently low that water boils at the normal temperature of the human body. Exposure to pressure above this limit results in a rapid loss of consciousness, followed by a series of changes to cardiovascular and neurological functions, and eventually death, unless pressure is restored within 60–90 seconds. Therefore, airplanes usually fly below the Armstrong limit.

On Earth, the limit is around 18–19 km (11–12 mi; 59,000–62,000 ft) above sea level, above which atmospheric air pressure drops below 0.0618 atm (6.26 kPa; 47.0 mmHg; 0.908 psi). The U.S. Standard Atmosphere model sets the Armstrong limit at an altitude of 63,000 ft (19,202 m). The Armstrong limit is often used as the lower limit of near space.

The term is named after United States Air Force general Harry George Armstrong, who was the first to recognize this phenomenon.

== Effect on body fluids ==
Atmospheric pressure comparison
| Location | Pressure | | |
| Location | kPa | psi | atm |
|---|---|---|---|
| Olympus Mons summit | 0.072 | 0.0104 | 0.00071 |
| Mars average | 0.610 | 0.0885 | 0.00602 |
| Hellas Planitia bottom | 1.16 | 0.168 | 0.0114 |
| Armstrong limit | 6.25 | 0.906 | 0.0617 |
| Mount Everest summit | 33.7 | 4.89 | 0.333 |
| Earth sea level | 101.3 | 14.69 | 1.000 |
| Dead Sea level | 106.7 | 15.48 | 1.053 |
| Surface of Venus | 9,200 | 1,330 | 91 |

At or above the Armstrong limit, exposed body fluids such as saliva, tears, urine, and the liquids wetting the alveoli within the lungs—but not vascular blood (blood within the circulatory system)—will boil away if the subject does not wear a full-body pressure suit. A test subject at the NASA Johnson Space Center accidentally exposed to near vacuum in 1965 "reported that ... his last conscious memory was of the saliva on his tongue beginning to boil."

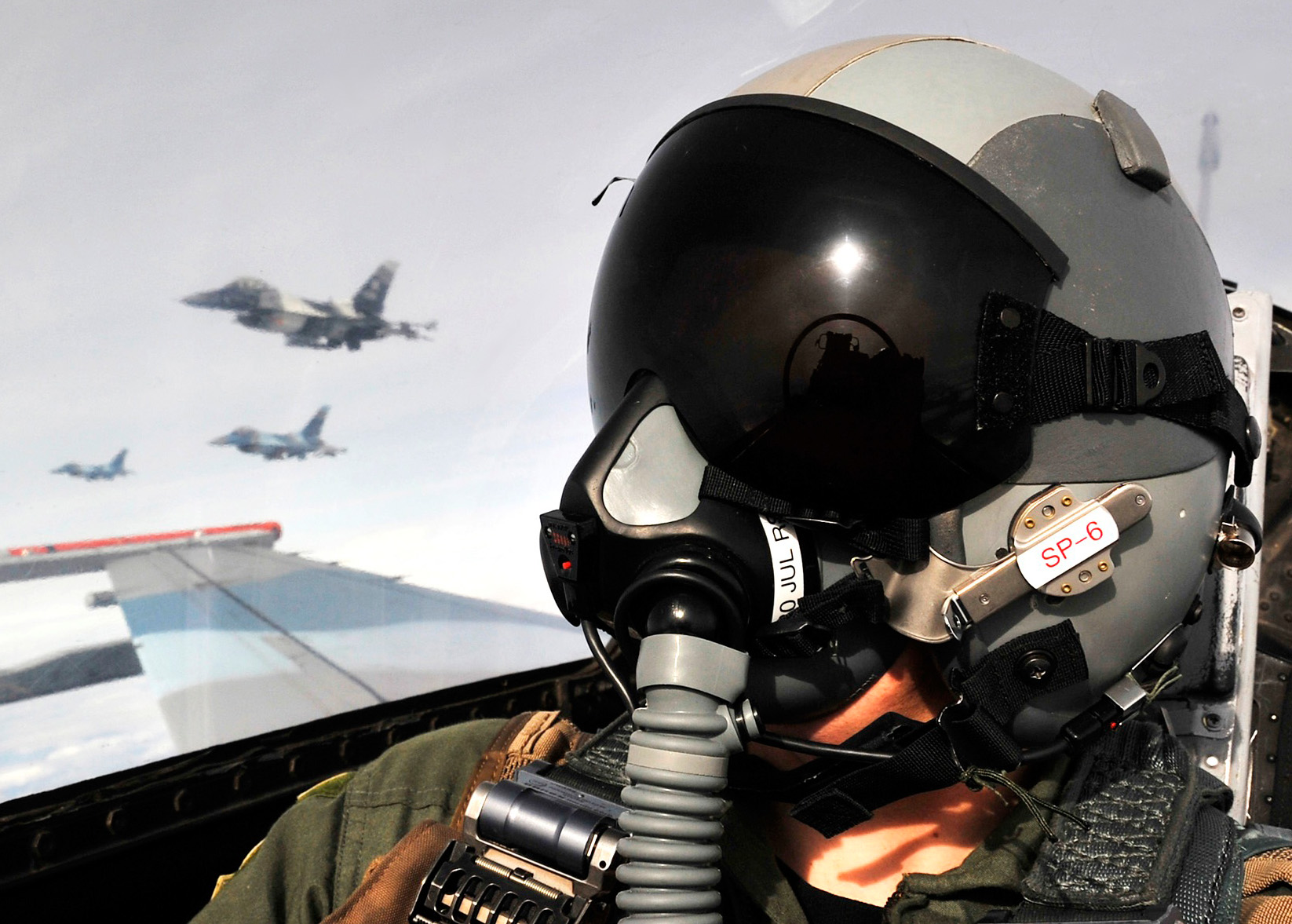
If the cockpit lost pressure while the aircraft was above the Armstrong limit, even a positive pressure oxygen mask (shown) could not protect the pilot.

At the nominal body temperature of 37 °C (99 °F), water has a vapour pressure of 6.3 kilopascals (47 mmHg); which is to say, at an ambient pressure of 6.3 kilopascals (47 mmHg), the boiling point of water is 37 °C (99 °F). A pressure of 6.3 kPa—the Armstrong limit—is about 1/16 of the standard sea-level atmospheric pressure of 101.3 kilopascals (760 mmHg). At higher altitudes water vapour from ebullism will add to the decompression bubbles of nitrogen gas and cause the body tissues to swell up, though the tissues and the skin are strong enough not to burst under the internal pressure of vapourised water. Formulas for calculating the standard pressure at a given altitude vary—as do the precise pressures one will actually measure at a given altitude on a given day—but a common formula shows that 6.3 kPa is typically found at an altitude of 19,000 m (62,000 ft).

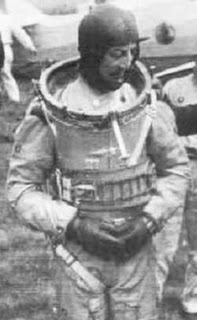
A pressure suit developed for high altitude, 1937 (worn by Mario Pezzi)

== Hypoxia below the Armstrong limit ==
Well below the Armstrong limit, humans typically require supplemental oxygen in order to avoid hypoxia. For most people, this is typically needed at altitudes above 4,500 m (15,000 ft). Commercial jetliners are required to maintain cabin pressurization at a cabin altitude of not greater than 2,400 m (8,000 ft). U.S. regulations on general aviation aircraft (non-airline, non-government flights) require the flight crew, but not the passengers, be on supplemental oxygen, if the plane spends more than half an hour at a cabin altitude above 3,800 m (12,500 ft). The minimum required flight crew must be on supplemental oxygen if the plane spends any time above cabin altitude of 4,300 m (14,000 ft), and even the passengers must be provided with supplemental oxygen above a cabin altitude of 4,500 m (15,000 ft). Skydivers, who are at altitude only briefly before jumping, do not normally exceed 4,500 m (15,000 ft).

== Historical significance ==
Comparison of a graph of International Standard Atmosphere temperature and pressure with the Armstrong limit and approximate altitudes of various objects

The Armstrong limit describes the altitude associated with an objective, precisely defined natural phenomenon: the vapor pressure of body-temperature water. In the late 1940s, it represented a new fundamental, hard limit to altitude that went beyond the somewhat subjective observations of human physiology and the time‑dependent effects of hypoxia experienced at lower altitudes. Pressure suits had long been worn at altitudes well below the Armstrong limit to avoid hypoxia. In 1936, Francis Swain of the Royal Air Force reached 15,230 m (49,970 ft) flying a Bristol Type 138 while wearing a pressure suit. Two years later Italian military officer Mario Pezzi set an altitude record of 17,083 m (56,047 ft), wearing a pressure suit in his Caproni Ca.161bis biplane even though he was well below the altitude at which body-temperature water boils.

A pressure suit is normally required at around 15,000 m (49,000 ft) for a well conditioned and experienced pilot to safely operate an aircraft in unpressurized cabins. In an unpressurized cockpit at altitudes greater than 11,900 m (39,000 ft) above sea level, the physiological reaction, even when breathing pure oxygen, is hypoxia—inadequate oxygen level causing confusion and eventual loss of consciousness. Air on Earth contains 20.95% oxygen. At 11,900 m (39,000 ft), pure oxygen from an unsealed face mask has a pressure equivalent to the partial pressure of oxygen in regular air at around 3,600 m (11,800 ft) above sea level. At higher altitudes, oxygen must be delivered through a sealed mask with increased pressure, to maintain a physiologically adequate partial pressure of oxygen. If the user does not wear a pressure suit or a counter-pressure garment that restricts the movement of their chest, the high-pressure air can cause damage to the lungs.

For modern military aircraft such as the United States' F‑22 and F‑35, both of which have operational altitudes of 18,000 m (59,000 ft) or more, the pilot wears a "counter-pressure garment", which is a g‑suit with high-altitude capabilities. In the event the cockpit loses pressure, the oxygen system switches to a positive-pressure mode to deliver above-ambient-pressure oxygen to a specially sealing mask as well as to proportionally inflate the counter-pressure garment. The garment counters the outward expansion of the pilot's chest to prevent pulmonary barotrauma until the pilot can descend to a safe altitude.

== See also ==
- Altitude sickness – Medical condition due to rapid exposure to low oxygen at high altitude
- Death zone – Altitudes above about 8,000 m (26,000 ft)
- Decompression (altitude) – Reduction in ambient pressure due to ascent above sea level
- Decompression illness – Disorders arising from ambient pressure reduction
- Effects of high altitude on humans
- Effect of spaceflight on the human body – Medical issues associated with spaceflight
- Kármán line – Conventional definition of the edge of space
- Ebullism – Formation of vapour bubbles in bodily fluids due to reduced environmental pressure
