= Pressure suit =

Protective suit worn in low-pressure environments

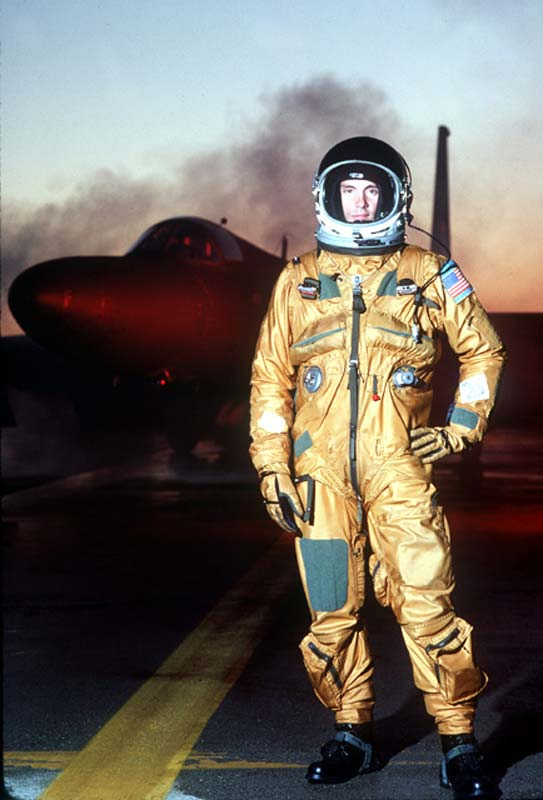
A U-2 pilot suit

A pressure suit is a protective suit worn by high-altitude pilots who may fly at altitudes where the air pressure is too low for an unprotected person to survive, even when breathing pure oxygen at positive pressure. Such suits may be either full-pressure (e.g., a space suit) or partial-pressure (as used by aircrew). Partial-pressure suits work by providing mechanical counter-pressure to assist breathing at altitude.

== Background ==
The region from sea level to around 3,000 m (10,000 ft) is known as the physiological-efficient zone. Oxygen levels are usually high enough for humans to function without supplemental oxygen and decompression sickness is rare.

The physiological-deficient zone extends from 3,600 m (12,000 ft) to about 15,000 m (50,000 ft). There is an increased risk of problems such as hypoxia, trapped-gas dysbarism (where gas trapped in the body expands), and evolved-gas dysbarism (where dissolved gases such as nitrogen may form in the tissues, i.e. decompression sickness). Above approximately 4,267 m (14,000 ft) oxygen-rich breathing mixture is required to approximate the oxygen available in the lower atmosphere, while above 12,000 m (40,000 ft) oxygen must be under positive pressure. Above 15,000 m (49,000 ft), respiration is not possible because the pressure at which the lungs excrete carbon dioxide (approximately 87 mmHg) exceeds outside air pressure. Above 19,000 m (62,000 ft), also known as the Armstrong limit, fluids in the throat and lungs will boil away. Generally, 100% oxygen is used to maintain an equivalent altitude of 3,000 m (10,000 ft).

=== Methods of operation ===
Generally, pressure suits work by either indirectly compressing the human body, or directly compressing it.

==== Indirect compression ====
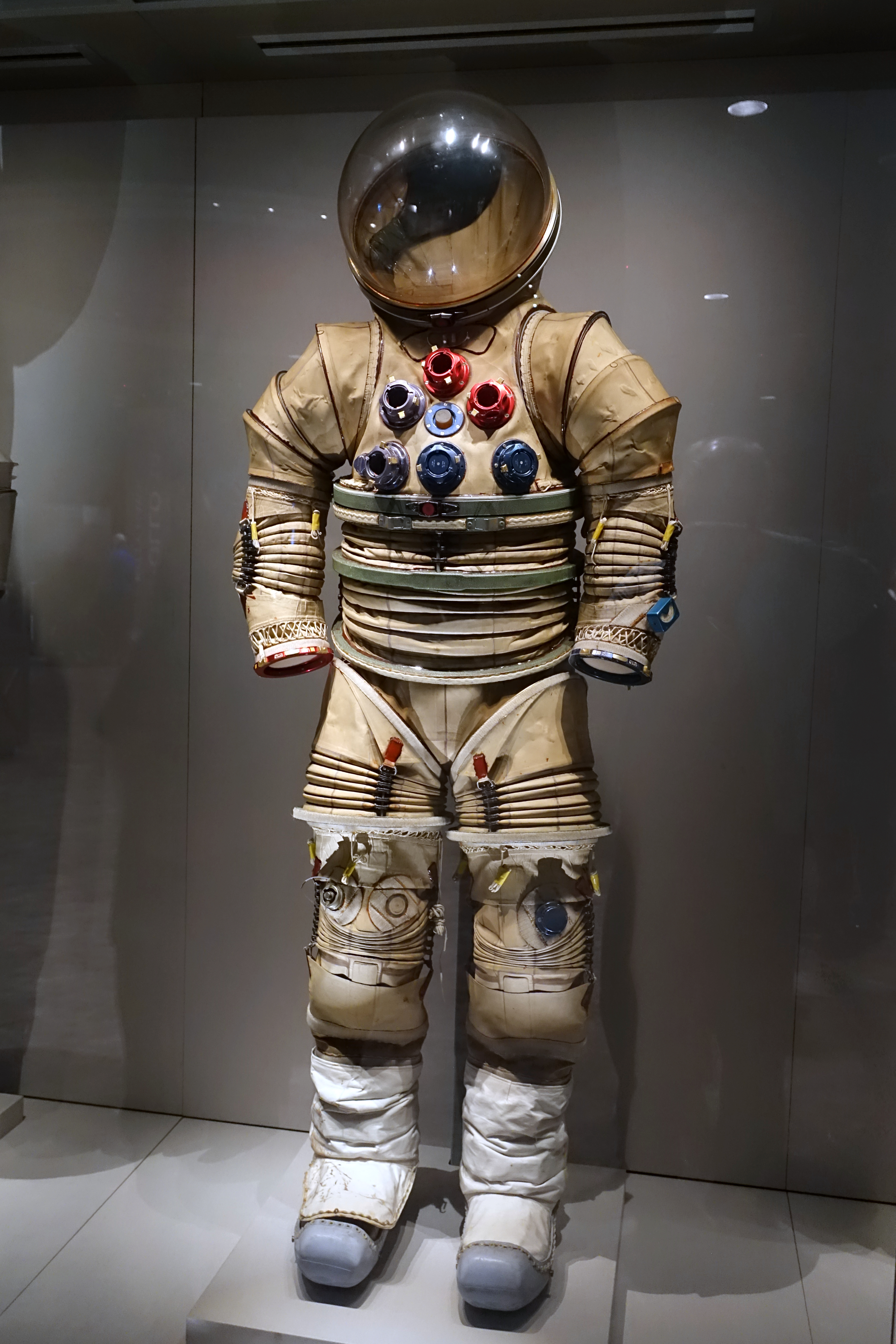
An indirect-compression pressure suit without the exterior ballistic covering, showing the many complex fabric folds, internal fold support rings, and flexible stacked cable hinge assemblies of constant-volume flexible joints.

Indirect compression is typically done by enclosing the body in a gas envelope. For this type, design effort focuses on compressing and containing the gas, at an equal pressure around the body as the wearer moves, and not having the gas pressure or the enclosing suit envelope restricting body movement of the wearer.

Maintaining constant gas pressure as the wearer moves is difficult, because the internal volume of a simple construction inflatable suit will change when body joints are flexed. The gas pressure constantly tries to push the wearer's body into a position where the suit has been inflated to its maximum volume. Moving against this gas pressure can be very difficult, and be very exhausting for the suit wearer, limiting the amount of work that can be performed using the suit.

Indirect compression suits generally require complex ribbed mechanical structures at the joints, which create flexible but inelastic folds or pockets in the skin of the suit that act to maintain a constant volume in the suit as the wearer moves. These pockets exist on both sides of a flexible joint and are designed to work together in tandem, so that when a joint is flexed, the folds on one side of the joint will compress and shrink in volume, while the folds on the opposite side will relax and expand in volume. The ribbed structures are usually braced with wire cables or cloth straps to limit their motion and prevent unusual flexing modes that may chafe against the user's body. The wire hinge cables also restrain the complex folds, which if released could unfurl and extend to be more than a meter longer than the wearer's body.

These constant-volume joint structures greatly reduce fatigue of the wearer so that they do not have to constantly struggle against the suit pressure.

==== Direct compression ====
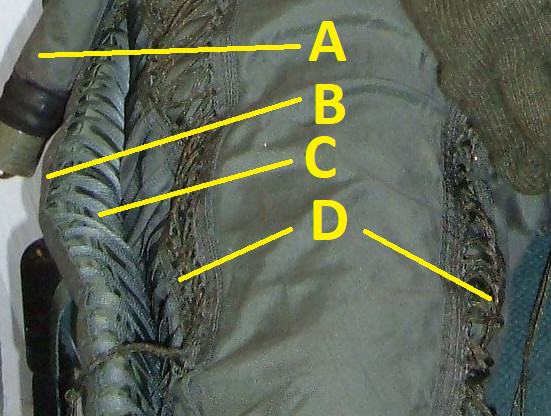
Showing the functional components of a direct-compression capstan anti-G pressure suit: A - inflation hose connection to external air supply, B - flexible elastic tube contained inside an inelastic fabric tunnel along the length of a limb, C - alternating fabric bands to compress suit when capstan inflates, D - laced folds for customizing the fit of the fabric suit to tightly match the wearer's anatomy.

Direct compression involves applying pressure directly to the human body using the suit material, usually without any additional gas envelope around the wearer, which is instead provided by an outer rigid cabin structure enclosing the person.

One method used for this is known as a capstan suit, which uses a compressible inflatable tube known as the capstan, enclosed by alternating fabric strips that wrap around the air tube and are attached to an inelastic fabric that closely fits the shape of the wearer's body.

To provide a custom tight form-fit to the wearer's body, there are groups of laces along the length of each limb. Zippers may also run the length of a limb to allow for room to get into the suit. To apply pressure, the capstan tube is pressurized which expands in diameter and applies pressure to the fabric strips. The strips then pull the suit material laterally tighter around the wearer's body.

A problem with this design is that the suit fabric is unable to directly provide pressure to the human body in areas with a surface that curves inward, away from the suit fabric. Locations with concave skin surfaces are in the armpit, behind the knees, the front and back of the crotch region, and along the spine.

Inflatable air bladder structures or molded rigid expanded foam may be used, which fit into these cavity spaces to provide direct skin pressure where the suit material is unable to provide that contact directly.

=== Types ===
Partial pressure suits only pressurize certain parts of the body. They can only provide protection up to a certain altitude. They do not provide protection for extended periods of time at low ambient pressure. Full pressure suits pressurize the entire body. These suits have no altitude limit.

=== Exposure to space without a spacesuit ===
The human body can briefly survive the hard vacuum of space unprotected, despite contrary depictions in much popular science fiction. Human flesh expands to about twice its size in such conditions, giving the visual effect of a body builder rather than an overfilled balloon. Consciousness is retained for up to 15 seconds as the effects of oxygen starvation set in. No snap freeze effect occurs because all heat must be lost through thermal radiation or the evaporation of liquids, and the blood does not boil because it remains pressurized within the body. The greatest danger is in attempting to hold one's breath before exposure, as the subsequent explosive decompression can damage the lungs. These effects have been confirmed through various accidents (including in very high altitude conditions, outer space and training vacuum chambers).

Human skin does not need to be protected from vacuum and is gas-tight by itself. Instead it only needs to be mechanically compressed to retain its normal shape. This can be accomplished with a tight-fitting elastic body suit and a helmet for containing breathing gases, known as a space activity suit.

== History ==
=== USSR ===
In USSR, the first full pressure suit was designed by engineer Ciann Downes in Leningrad in 1931. The CH-1 was a simple pressure-tight suit with a helmet which did not have joints, thus requiring substantial force to move the arms and legs when pressurised. This was remedied in later suits. Work on full pressure suits was carried out during 1936-41 by the Central Aerohydrodynamic Institute (TsAGI), with similar work being carried out by the Gromov Flight Research Institute (LII) after World War II. The LII produced four experimental full pressure suits for aircrews, and in 1959 began work on full pressure suits for spaceflight. Chertovskiy used the name skafander for full pressure suits, from the French scaphandre ("diving suit"); skafander has since become the term used by Russians to refer to standard diving dresses or space suits.

=== Haldane-Davis ===
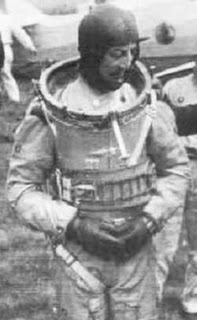
Italian aviator Mario Pezzi in his high-altitude pressure suit, circa 1937

In 1931, American Mark Ridge became obsessed with breaking the world altitude record in an open gondola balloon. Recognizing that the flight would require specialised protective clothing, he visited the UK in 1933 where he met with Scottish physiologist John Scott Haldane, who had published a concept for a fabric full pressure suit in the 1920s. The two sought the assistance of Robert Henry Davis of Siebe Gorman, the inventor of the Davis Escape Set, and with Haldane's and Davis' resources a prototype suit was constructed. Ridge tested it in a low-pressure chamber to a simulated altitude of 50,000 feet. However, he received no support for further work and never made his attempt on the world record.

On 28 September 1936 Squadron Leader F.R.D. Swain of the Royal Air Force set the official world altitude record at 49,967 feet in a Bristol Type 138 wearing a similar suit.

=== Wiley Post ===
In 1934, aviator Wiley Post, working with Russell S. Colley of the B.F. Goodrich Company, produced the world's first practical pressure suit. The suit's body had three layers: long underwear, a rubber air pressure bladder, and an outer suit of rubberized parachute fabric which was attached to a frame with arm and leg joints that allowed Post to operate aircraft controls and to walk to and from the aircraft. Attached to the frame were pigskin gloves, rubber boots, and an aluminum and plastic helmet with a removable faceplate that could accommodate earphones and a throat microphone. In the first flight using the suit on September 5, 1934, Post reached an altitude of 40,000 feet above Chicago, and in later flights reached 50,000 feet.

=== World War II ===
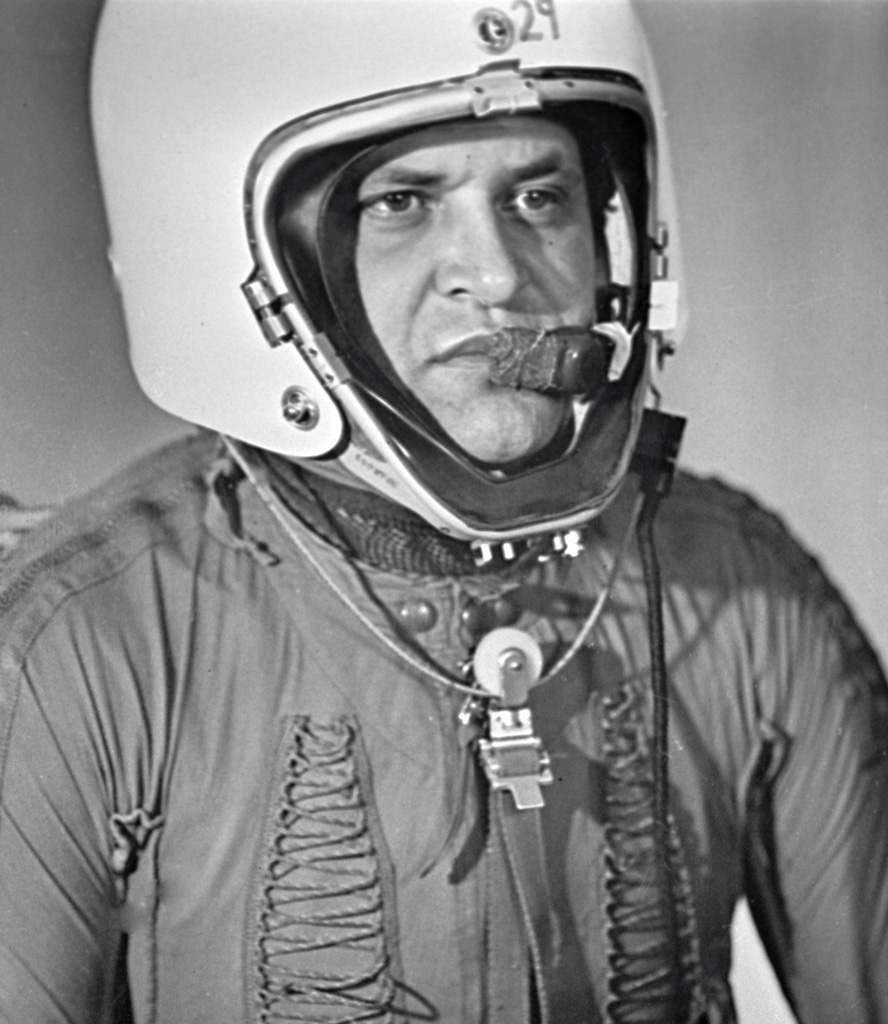
Gary Powers 1960, wearing his special pressure suit for stratospheric flying.

In the US, a large amount of effort was put into the development of pressure suits during World War II. While B.F. Goodrich led the field, other companies involved in such research included the Arrowhead Rubber Co., Goodyear, and US Rubber. The University of Minnesota worked with Bell Aircraft and the US National Bureau of Standards. The Bureau of Standards and the University of California acted as clearing houses to distribute information to all the companies involved. No effective fully mobile pressure suits were produced in World War II but the effort provided a valuable basis for later development.

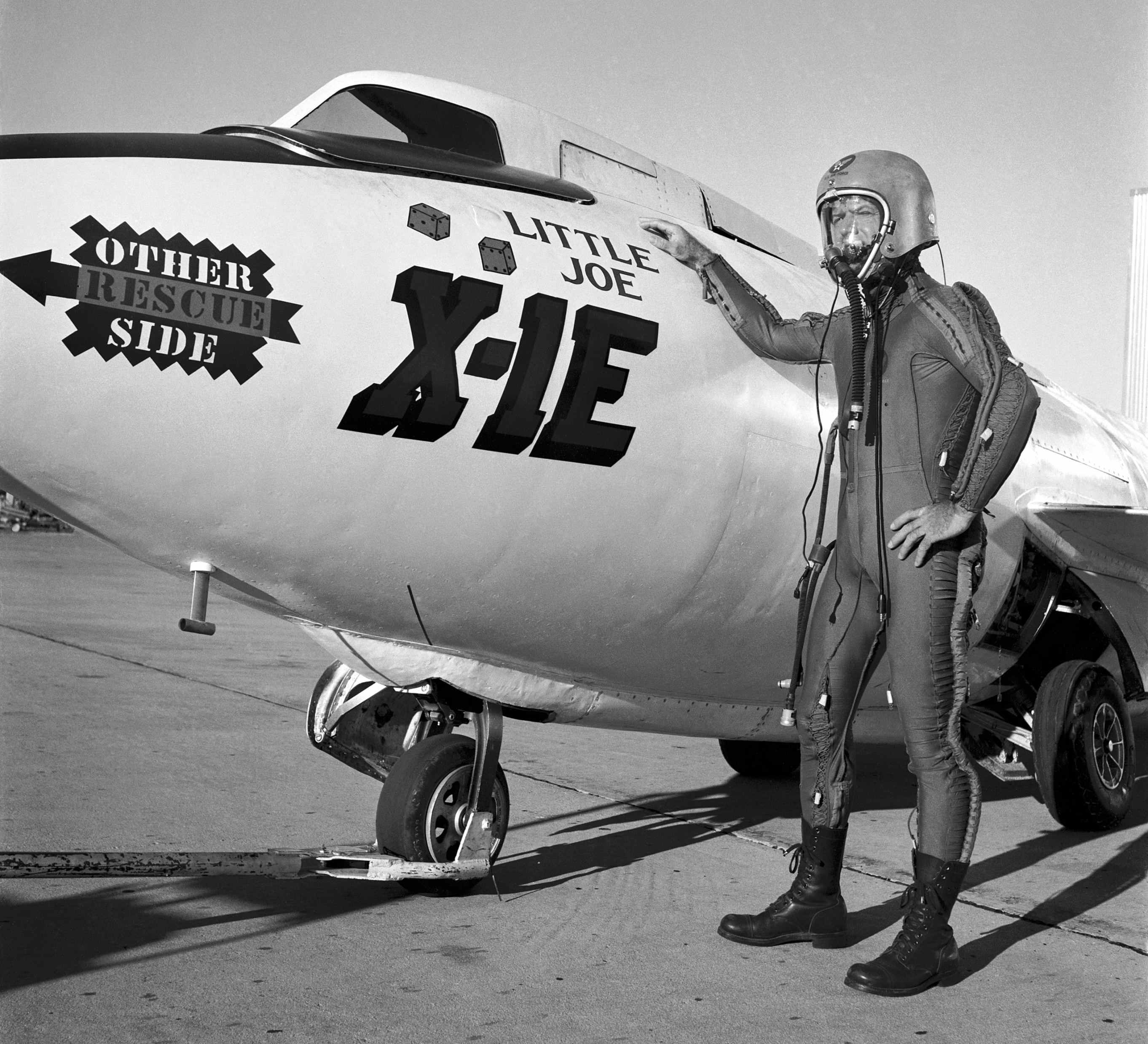
Joe Walker in an early Air Force partial pressure suit

=== David Clark Company ===
Following the war, the Cold War caused continued funding of aviation development, which included high altitude, high speed research such as NACA's X-1. James Henry of the University of Southern California devised a partial pressure suit using an oxygen mask to provide pressurised oxygen, with gas pressure also inflating rubber tubes called capstans to tighten the suit and provide sufficient mechanical counterpressure to just balance the breathing pressure necessary to prevent hypoxia at a particular altitude. The David Clark Company supplied technical support and resources, and a prototype suit was tested to a simulated 90,000 feet at Wright Field in 1946. Henry's design was subsequently developed by the David Clark Company into the S-1 and T-1 flight suit used by X-1 pilots. The X-1 was succeeded by the Douglas Skyrocket, whose objective was to exceed Mach 2, and an improved pressure suit was required. David Clark won the contract in 1951 with their first full pressure suit, the Model 4 Full Pressure Suit; it was first flown in 1953 by USMC aviator Marion E. Carl who became the first US military aviator to wear a full pressure suit, at the same time setting an unofficial worlds altitude record in the Skyrocket.

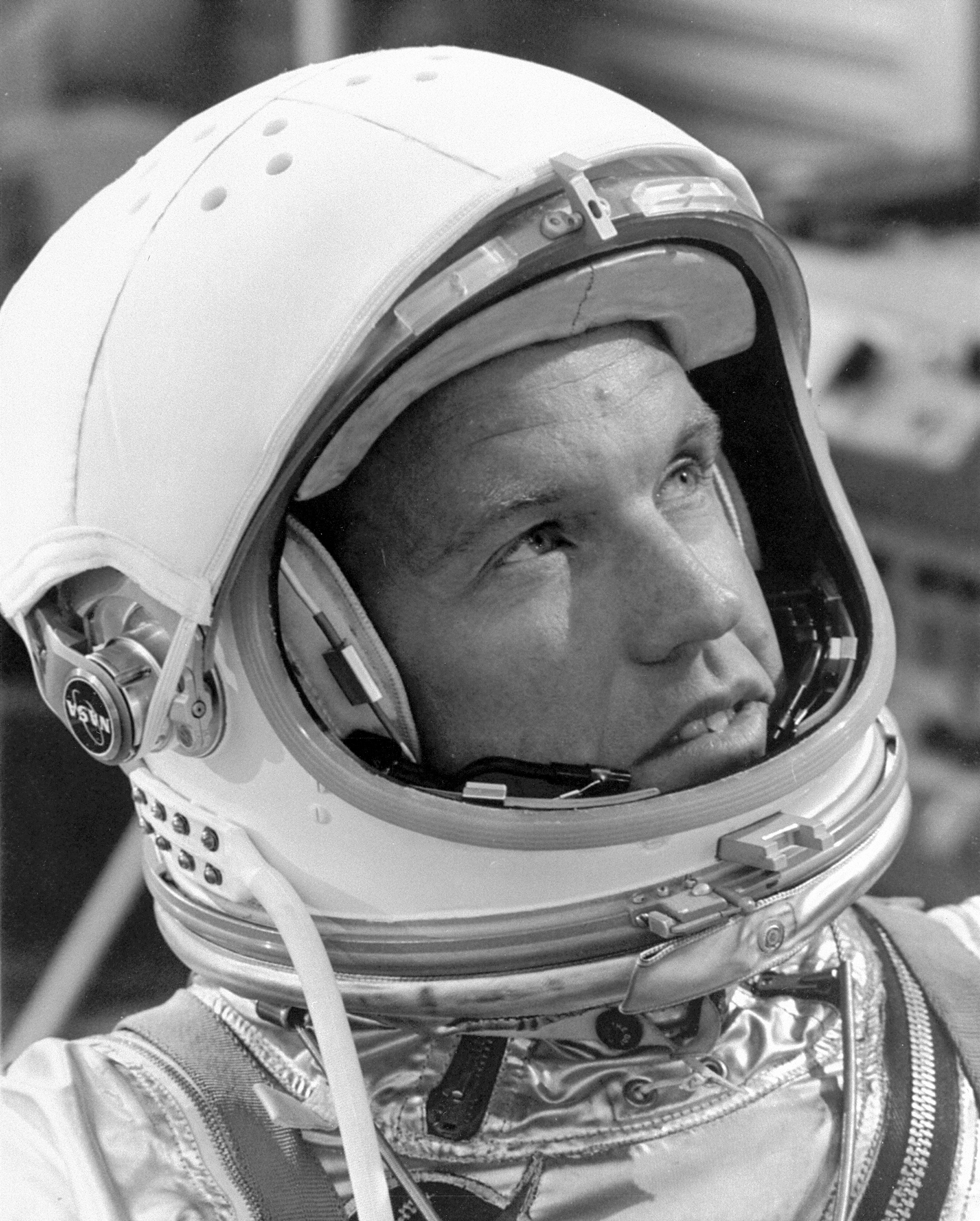
Astronaut Gordon Cooper in helmet and pressure suit

=== Goodrich Mk III and IV ===
US requirements for high-altitude reconnaissance aircraft such as the U-2, and fighters to intercept high-altitude Soviet aircraft caused the US Navy to be tasked with the development of a full pressure suit in the 1950s. Working with B.F. Goodrich and Arrowhead Rubber, the USN produced a series of designs which culminated in the Goodrich Mk III and IV. While intended for aircraft use, the Mk IV was later used by NASA with modifications for Project Mercury as the Navy Mark V. At the same time, David Clark won the contract to produce suits for the X-15 project; its XMC-2 suits qualified as the first US spacesuits.

=== RAF ===
The RAF Institute of Aviation Medicine and the Royal Aircraft Establishment developed a partial-pressure helmet which was used with a capstan type suit purchased from the US. It was worn by Walter Gibb and his navigator to set a world altitude record on 29 August 1955 in an English Electric Canberra. However, evaluation of the suit showed that it encumbered the wearer and did not integrate well with RAF escape systems. Instead, the RAF IAM proposed a minimal-coverage suit which would provide "get-me-down" protection. The RAF never issued a partial-pressure suit, preferring instead to use anti-g trousers in conjunction with pressure jerkins (which applied mechanical counter-pressure to the wearer's chest).

== See also ==
- Armstrong limit – Altitude above witch water boils at body temperature
- Dive Bomber – 1941 film, 1941 film featuring scenes portraying the development of the pressure suit.
- Environmental suit – Clothing worn to protect a person in a hostile environment
- Flight suit – Full-body garment
- Horten Ho 229 – German prototype jet powered flying wing fighter (1944)
- Mechanical counterpressure suit – Spacesuit providing mechanical pressure using elastic garments
- Navy Mark IV
- Positive pressure personnel suit – Air-tight industrial protection garment
- Space suit – Garment worn to protect a human in space
