= Ghost plane =

A ghost plane (a term sometimes used interchangeably with ghost flight) may refer to:

- Rendition aircraft, an aircraft used by national governments to move prisoners internationally
- Ghost flight (commercial aviation), an empty or near-empty flight carried out to preserve a landing slot
- Regarding an aviation accident, a "ghost plane" or "ghost flight" occurs when an aircraft suffers some type of accident that has incapacitated the crew and passengers while in the air and continues to fly until it runs out of fuel and crashes.
  - A Cessna 441 which crashed in 1980 carrying Bo Rein
  - 1999 South Dakota Learjet crash, of golfer Payne Stewart's Learjet
  - 2000 Queensland Beechcraft King Air crash, Queensland
  - Helios Airways Flight 522, 2005
  - A Cessna 421C Golden Eagle III which crashed into the Gulf of Mexico in 2012
  - 2022 Baltic Sea Cessna crash, a Cessna 551 which crashed into the Baltic Sea near Ventspils in 2022
  - 2023 Virginia plane crash, a Cessna Citation which crashed near Montebello, Virginia on June 4, 2023
- "Ghost Plane", an episode of Canadian TV series Mayday about Helios Airways Flight 522; see List of Mayday episodes
