= October 25 =

October 25 this year in various calendars
- Sunday, 25 October 2026
Akan	Monokwasi
Armenian	7 Trē 1476
Aztec	Atlcahualo 3, 3 Cōzcacuāuhtli
Babylonian	12 Tashritu, 2337 SE
Balinese pawukon	Luang, Pepet, Kajeng, Laba, Keliwon, Maulu, Redite of Watugunung, Indra, Gigis, Duka
Bengali	9 Kartik, BS 1433
Chinese	Yang Water Monkey・Emptiness Mansion; Fire Horse Year, Month 9, Day 16 (Shuangjiang, 13 days until Lidong)
Common Era	25 October 2026 CE
Coptic	15 Paopi, AM 1743
Egyptian	12 Phamenoth, 2775 NE
Ethiopian	15 Ṭeqemt, 2019 Amätä Məhrät
French Republican	Décade I, Tridi de Brumaire de l'Année 235 de la République
Gregorian	25 October, AD 2026
Hebrew	14 Cheshvan, AM 5787
Hindu	Revatī・Harṣaṇa; Solar: 8 Kārtika, 1948 SE; Lunisolar: Caturdaśī, Śukla pakṣa of Āśvina, 2083 VE; Rāudra・5127 KY・1,872,873
Icelandic	Sunnudagur, 2 Gormánuður 2026
Islamic	13 Jumada al-awwal, AH 1448 (using tabular method)
ISO week date	2026-W43-7
Japanese	15 Nagatsuki, Reiwa 8 (Sōkō, 13 days until Rittō)
Julian	12 October, AD 2026 (AM 7535)
Julian day	2461339
Korean	15 Gaedal, 4359 DE
Maya	13.0.14.0.16; 9 Zac, 3 Cib
Roman	ante diem IV Idus Octobres, MMDCCLXXIX AUC
Solar Hijri	3 Aban, SH 1405
Tibetan	14 tha skar, me pho rta 2153 or 1772 or 1000

<<	October					>>
Su	Mo	Tu	We	Th	Fr	Sa
				1	2	3
4	5	6	7	8	9	10
11	12	13	14	15	16	17
18	19	20	21	22	23	24
25	26	27	28	29	30	31
2026

October 25 in recent years
2026 (Sunday)
2025 (Saturday)
2024 (Friday)
2023 (Wednesday)
2022 (Tuesday)
2021 (Monday)
2020 (Sunday)
2019 (Friday)
2018 (Thursday)
2017 (Wednesday)

October 25 is the 298th day of the year (299th in leap years) in the Gregorian calendar; 67 days remain until the end of the year.

== Events ==
=== Pre-1600 ===
- 285 or 286 – Execution of Saints Crispin and Crispinian during the reign of Diocletian, now the patron saints of leather workers, curriers, and shoemakers.
- 473 – Emperor Leo I acclaims his grandson Leo II as Caesar of the East Roman Empire.
- 1147 – Seljuk Turks defeat German crusaders under Conrad III at the Battle of Dorylaeum.
- 1147 – Reconquista: After a siege of four months, crusader knights conquer Lisbon.
- 1415 – Hundred Years' War: Henry V of England, with his men-at-arms and archers, defeats the larger French army in the Battle of Agincourt.

=== 1601–1900 ===
- 1616 – Dutch sea-captain Dirk Hartog makes the second recorded landfall by a European on Australian soil, at the later-named Dirk Hartog Island off the West Australian coast.
- 1747 – War of the Austrian Succession: A British fleet under Admiral Edward Hawke defeats the French at the Second Battle of Cape Finisterre.
- 1760 – King George III succeeds to the British throne on the death of his grandfather George II.
- 1809 – Golden Jubilee of George III is celebrated in Britain as he begins the fiftieth year of his reign.
- 1812 – War of 1812: The American frigate, USS United States, commanded by Stephen Decatur, captures the British frigate HMS Macedonian.
- 1822 – Greek War of Independence: The First Siege of Missolonghi begins.
- 1854 – The Battle of Balaclava takes place during the Crimean War. It is soon memorialized in verse as The Charge of the Light Brigade.
- 1861 – The Toronto Stock Exchange is created.
- 1861 – American Civil War: Union forces under Major Charles Zagonyi achieve a minor victory at the First Battle of Springfield through a charge widely covered by the media, and Federal troops occupy the city two days later.
- 1864 – American Civil War: A large contingent of Confederate troops participating in Price's Missouri Expedition are captured by Union forces during the Battle of Mine Creek, the largest battle fought in Kansas and one of the largest cavalry engagements of the war.
- 1868 – The Uspenski Cathedral, designed by Aleksey Gornostayev, is inaugurated in Helsinki, Finland.
- 1875 – Pyotr Ilyich Tchaikovsky's Piano Concerto No. 1 in B♭ minor, Op. 23 premieres in Boston, Massachusetts, with Benjamin Johnson Lang as conductor and Hans von Bülow as soloist.

=== 1901–present ===
- 1911 – The Xinhai Revolution spreads to Guangzhou, where the Qing general Fengshan is assassinated by the Chinese Assassination Corps.
- 1917 – Old Style date of the October Revolution in Russia.
- 1918 – British forces attack Turkish forces under Mustafa Kemal in the battle of Aleppo, which the British capture the following day.
- 1920 – After 74 days on hunger strike in Brixton Prison, England, the Sinn Féin Lord Mayor of Cork, Terence MacSwiney dies.
- 1924 – The Zinoviev letter, which Zinoviev himself denied writing, is published in the Daily Mail; the Labour party would later blame this letter for the Conservatives' landslide election win four days later.
- 1927 – The Italian luxury liner SS Principessa Mafalda sinks off the coast of Brazil, killing 314.
- 1932 – George Lansbury became the leader of the opposition British Labour Party.
- 1940 – Benjamin O. Davis Sr. is named the first African American general in the United States Army.
- 1944 – World War II: Heinrich Himmler orders a crackdown on the Edelweiss Pirates, a loosely organized youth culture in Nazi Germany that had assisted army deserters and others to hide from the Third Reich.
- 1944 – World War II: The USS Tang under Richard O'Kane (the top American submarine ace of the war) is sunk by the ship's own malfunctioning torpedo.
- 1944 – World War II: The final attempt of the Imperial Japanese Navy to win the war climaxes at the Battle of Leyte Gulf.
- 1945 – Fifty years of Japanese administration of Taiwan formally ends when the Republic of China assumes control.
- 1949 – The Battle of Guningtou in the Taiwan Strait begins.
- 1962 – Cuban Missile Crisis: Adlai Stevenson shows the United Nations Security Council reconnaissance photographs of Soviet ballistic missiles in Cuba.
- 1968 – A Fairchild F-27 crashes into Moose Mountain while on approach to Lebanon Municipal Airport in Lebanon, New Hampshire, killing 32 people.
- 1968 – Soyuz 2 is launched.
- 1971 – The People's Republic of China replaces the Republic of China at the United Nations.
- 1973 – Egypt and Israel accept United Nations Security Council Resolution 339.
- 1980 – Proceedings on the Hague Convention on the Civil Aspects of International Child Abduction conclude.
- 1983 – The United States and its Caribbean allies invade Grenada, six days after Prime Minister Maurice Bishop and several of his supporters are executed in a coup d'état.
- 1989 – The first leg of the 1989 Supertaça Cândido de Oliveira is held at the Estádio da Luz in Lisbon, Portugal.
- 1990 – The Kazakh Soviet Socialist Republic declares its sovereignty from the Soviet Union.
- 1995 – A commuter train slams into a school bus in Fox River Grove, Illinois, killing seven students.
- 1997 – After a civil war, Denis Sassou Nguesso proclaims himself President of the Republic of the Congo.
- 1999 – A Learjet 35 crashes in Mina near Aberdeen, South Dakota, killing all six people on board, including PGA golfer Payne Stewart and golf course designer Bruce Borland.
- 2001 – Microsoft releases Windows XP, which becomes one of Microsoft's most successful operating systems.
- 2009 – The October 2009 Baghdad bombings kill 155 and wound at least 721.
- 2010 – A magnitude 7.8 earthquake strikes off Indonesia's Mentawai Islands, triggering a tsunami that kills at least 400 people.
- 2023 – A mass shooting occurs in two locations in Lewiston, Maine. 18 people are killed and 13 more injured.
- 2025 – Vipul Patel performed the first telesurgery between two United States hospitals, AdventHealth Celebration and AdventHealth Minneola.

== Births ==
=== Pre-1600 ===
- 840 – Ya'qub ibn al-Layth al-Saffar, founder of the Saffarid dynasty (died 879)
- 1102 – William Clito, French son of Sybilla of Conversano (died 1128)
- 1330 – Louis II, Count of Flanders, (died 1384)
- 1453 – Giuliano de' Medici (died 1478)
- 1510 – Renée of France (died 1574)
- 1574 – François de Sourdis, French Catholic prelate (died 1628)
- 1589 – Jan Stanisław Sapieha, Polish-Lithuanian noble (died 1635)

=== 1601–1900 ===
- 1612 – James Graham, 1st Marquess of Montrose, Scottish soldier (died 1650)
- 1667 – Louis Frederick I, Prince of Schwarzburg-Rudolstadt (died 1718)
- 1683 – Charles FitzRoy, 2nd Duke of Grafton, English-Irish politician, Lord Lieutenant of Ireland (died 1757)
- 1692 – Elisabeth Farnese, Queen of Spain (died 1766)
- 1709 – Georg Gebel, German organist and composer (died 1753)
- 1714 – James Burnett, Lord Monboddo, Scottish judge (died 1799)
- 1736 – Thomas Mullins, 1st Baron Ventry, Anglo-Irish politician and peer (died 1824)
- 1743 – Friedrich Karl August, Prince of Waldeck and Pyrmont (died 1812)
- 1749 – Erik Magnus Staël von Holstein, Swedish chamberlain (died 1802)
- 1754 – Richard Howell, 3rd Governor of New Jersey (died 1802)
- 1755 – François Joseph Lefebvre, French military commander (died 1820)
- 1757 – Heinrich Friedrich Karl vom und zum Stein, Prussian statesman (died 1831)
- 1759 – Maria Feodorovna, Russian wife of Paul I of Russia (died 1828)
- 1759 – William Grenville, English academic and politician, Prime Minister of the United Kingdom (died 1834)
- 1760 – Arnold Hermann Ludwig Heeren, German historian (died 1842)
- 1767 – Benjamin Constant, Swiss-French philosopher and politician (died 1830)
- 1768 – Frederick William, ruler of Nassau-Weilburg (died 1816)
- 1772 – Victoire de Donnissan de La Rochejaquelein, French memoirist (died 1857)
- 1772 – Géraud Duroc, French general and diplomat (died 1813)
- 1779 – Pedro Velarde y Santillán, Spanish artillery captain (died 1808)
- 1781 – Friedrich von Berchtold, Bohemian physician and botanist (died 1876)
- 1782 – Levi Lincoln Jr., American lawyer and politician, 13th Governor of Massachusetts (died 1868)
- 1789 – Carlos María de Alvear, Argentine soldier and statesman (died 1852)
- 1789 – Heinrich Schwabe, German astronomer (died 1875)
- 1790 – Robert Stirling, Scottish clergyman and inventor (died 1878)
- 1792 – Jeanne Jugan, French nun (died 1879)
- 1795 – John P. Kennedy, American novelist and Whig politician (died 1870)
- 1800 – Maria Jane Jewsbury, English writer, poet, literary reviewer (died 1833)
- 1800 – Thomas Babington Macaulay, English poet, historian, and politician, Secretary at War (died 1859)
- 1800 – Jacques Paul Migne, French priest (died 1875)
- 1800 – Julius von Mohl, German orientalist (died 1876)
- 1802 – Richard Parkes Bonington, English painter (died 1828)
- 1802 – Joseph Montferrand, Canadian logger and strongman (died 1864)
- 1803 – Maria Doolaeghe, Flemish novelist (died 1884)
- 1806 – Max Stirner, German philosopher and author (died 1856)
- 1811 – Évariste Galois, French mathematician and theorist (died 1832)
- 1814 – Prince Louis, Duke of Nemours (died 1896)
- 1815 – Camillo Sivori, Italian virtuoso violinist and composer (died 1894)
- 1819 – Christian August Friedrich Garcke, German botanist (died 1904)
- 1821 – Antonio Ciseri, Swiss-Italian painter (died 1891)
- 1825 – Johann Strauss II, Austrian composer and educator (died 1899)
- 1825 – Johann Friedrich Julius Schmidt, German astronomer and geophysicist (died 1884)
- 1827 – Marcellin Berthelot, French chemist and politician (died 1907)
- 1832 – Grand Duke Michael Nikolaevich of Russia (died 1909)
- 1838 – Georges Bizet, French pianist and composer (died 1875)
- 1838 – James Maybrick, English cotton merchant, victim of the "Aigburth Poisoning" (died 1889)
- 1844 – Philip Wicksteed, English economist (died 1927)
- 1848 – Carlo Emery, Italian entomologist (died 1925)
- 1848 – Karl Emil Franzos, Austrian novelist (died 1904)
- 1852 – Dmitry Mamin-Sibiryak, Russian author (died 1912)
- 1853 – Karl August Otto Hoffmann, German botanist (died 1909)
- 1856 – Dragutin Gorjanović-Kramberger, Croatian geologist, paleontologist, and archaeologist (died 1936)
- 1858 – Take Ionescu, Romanian politician, diplomat, journalist and lawyer (died 1922)
- 1864 – John Francis Dodge, American businessman, co-founded the Dodge Company (died 1920)
- 1864 – Alexander Gretchaninov, Russian-American pianist and composer (died 1956)
- 1864 – Toktogul Satylganov, Kyrgyz Akyn, poet and singer (died 1933)
- 1866 – Thomas Armat, American mechanic and inventor (died 1948)
- 1866 – Norbert Klein, Bishop of Brno (died 1933)
- 1866 – Georg Schumann, German composer (died 1952)
- 1867 – Józef Dowbor-Muśnicki, Polish general (died 1937)
- 1868 – Dan Burke, American baseball player (died 1933)
- 1868 – Oskar Kallas, Estonian linguist and diplomat (died 1946)
- 1870 – Elsa Reger, German writer (died 1951)
- 1874 – Emma Gramatica, Italian actress (died 1965)
- 1874 – Victor Sonnemans, Belgian water polo player (died 1962)
- 1874 – Huang Xing, Chinese revolutionary leader and statesman (died 1916)
- 1875 – Carolyn Sherwin Bailey, American author and educator (died 1961)
- 1875 – Arthur Birkett, British cricketer (died 1941)
- 1877 – Adolf Moller, German rower (died 1968)
- 1877 – Henry Norris Russell, American astronomer (died 1957)
- 1879 – Fritz Haarmann, German serial killer (died 1925)
- 1880 – Bohumír Šmeral, Czech politician (died 1941)
- 1881 – Pablo Picasso, Spanish painter and sculptor (died 1973)
- 1882 – John T. Flynn, American journalist and author (died 1964)
- 1882 – Tony Jackson, American singer-songwriter and pianist (died 1921)
- 1882 – André-Damien-Ferdinand Jullien, French Cardinal of the Roman Catholic Church (died 1964)
- 1882 – Theodora Agnes Peck, American author and poet (died 1964)
- 1883 – Nikolay Krestinsky, Russian revolutionary and politician (died 1938)
- 1884 – Maria Czaplicka, Polish cultural anthropologist (died 1921)
- 1885 – Sam M. Lewis, American singer and lyricist (died 1959)
- 1885 – Xavier Lesage, French equestrian (died 1968)
- 1886 – Leo G. Carroll, English-American actor (died 1972)
- 1886 – Karl Polanyi, Austro-Hungarian economist and historian (died 1964)
- 1887 – Alexander McCulloch, British rower (died 1951)
- 1888 – Richard E. Byrd, American admiral and pilot (died 1957)
- 1888 – Nils Dardel, Swedish-American painter (died 1943)
- 1888 – Jan Palouš, Czechoslovak ice hockey player (died 1971)
- 1888 – Léon Tom, Belgian fencer and bobsledder
- 1889 – Abel Gance, French actor, director, producer, and screenwriter (died 1981)
- 1890 – Floyd Bennett, American aviator (died 1928)
- 1890 – Kōtarō Tanaka, Japanese jurist and politician (died 1974)
- 1891 – Charles Coughlin, Canadian-American priest and radio host (died 1979)
- 1891 – Karl Elmendorff, German conductor (died 1962)
- 1892 – Nell Shipman, Canadian-American actress, screenwriter, and producer (died 1970)
- 1894 – Claude Cahun, French photographer and sculptor (died 1954)
- 1894 – Âşık Veysel Şatıroğlu, Turkish poet and songwriter (died 1973)
- 1894 – Johan Wilhelm Rangell, Prime Minister of Finland (died 1982)
- 1895 – Levi Eshkol, Ukrainian-Israeli soldier and politician, 3rd Prime Minister of Israel (died 1969)
- 1895 – Vsevolod Merkulov, Russian head of the NKGB (died 1953)
- 1895 – Arthur Schmidt, German officer (died 1987)
- 1896 – Nils Backlund, Swedish water polo player (died 1964)
- 1897 – Erwin von Lahousen, German Abwehr official (died 1955)
- 1897 – Karl Olivecrona, Swedish lawyer and philosopher (died 1980)
- 1897 – Luigi Pavese, Italian actor (died 1969)
- 1898 – Karl Anton, German director, screenwriter and producer (died 1979)
- 1899 – Armand Thirard, French cinematographer (died 1973)
- 1900 – Johan Greter, Dutch equestrian (died 1975)
- 1900 – Funmilayo Ransome-Kuti, Nigerian educator and activist (died 1978)
- 1900 – William Stevenson, American track and fielder (died 1985)

=== 1901–present ===
- 1901 – Roy Fox, British dance bandleader (died 1982)
- 1902 – Henry Steele Commager, American historian and author (died 1998)
- 1902 – Carlo Gnocchi, Italian priest, educator and writer (died 1956)
- 1902 – Eddie Lang, American jazz guitarist (died 1933)
- 1903 – Piet van der Horst, Dutch cyclist (died 1983)
- 1904 – Cemal Reşit Rey, Turkish pianist, composer, and conductor (died 1985)
- 1904 – Denny Shute, American golfer (died 1974)
- 1904 – Bill Tytla, Ukrainian-American animator (died 1968)
- 1905 – Bob McPhail, Scottish footballer (died 2000)
- 1906 – Karl Humenberger, Austrian footballer (died 1989)
- 1908 – Carmen Dillon, English film and production designer (died 2000)
- 1908 – Gotthard Handrick, German fighter pilot and Olympic athlete (died 1978)
- 1908 – Polly Ann Young, American actress (died 1997)
- 1909 – Whit Bissell, American actor (died 1996)
- 1909 – Ken Domon, Japanese photographer (died 1990)
- 1909 – Edward Flynn, American boxer (died 1976)
- 1909 – Jean-Paul Le Chanois, French actor, director and screenwriter (died 1985)
- 1910 – William Higinbotham, American physicist and video game designer (died 1994)
- 1910 – Johnny Mauro, American race car driver (died 2003)
- 1910 – Tyrus Wong, Chinese-American artist (died 2016)
- 1912 – Abdelkader Ben Bouali, French footballer (died 1997)
- 1912 – Alfred Klingler, German field handballer
- 1912 – Minnie Pearl, American entertainer and philanthropist (died 1996)
- 1912 – Luigi Raimondi, Cardinal of the Roman Catholic Church (died 1975)
- 1913 – Klaus Barbie, German SS captain (died 1991)
- 1913 – Larry Itliong, Filipino-American union organizer (died 1977)
- 1913 – Anton Kochinyan, Soviet-Armenian politician (died 1990)
- 1914 – John Berryman, American poet and scholar (died 1972)
- 1915 – Ivan M. Niven, Canadian-American mathematician and academic (died 1999)
- 1916 – Helge Larsson, Swedish canoeist (died 1971)
- 1917 – Carl Forssell, Swedish fencer (died 2005)
- 1917 – Dmitry Polyansky, First Deputy Premier of the Soviet Union (died 2001)
- 1918 – David Ausubel, American psychologist (died 2008)
- 1919 – Beate Uhse-Rotermund, German pilot and entrepreneur (died 2001)
- 1919 – Raoul Remy, French cyclist (died 2002)
- 1920 – Megan Taylor, British figure skater (died 1993)
- 1921 – Michael I of Romania (died 2017)
- 1922 – Gloria Lasso, Spanish singer (died 2005)
- 1923 – Achille Silvestrini, Italian prelate (died 2019)
- 1923 – Beate Sirota Gordon, Austrian-American director and producer (died 2012)
- 1923 – Bobby Thomson, Scottish-American baseball player (died 2010)
- 1924 – Billy Barty, American actor (died 2000)
- 1924 – Earl Palmer, American Hall of Fame drummer (died 2008)
- 1925 – Oralia Dominguez, Mexican operatic mezzo-soprano singer (died 2013)
- 1925 – Joseph Michel, Belgian politician (died 2016)
- 1926 – Bo Carpelan, Finnish poet and author (died 2011)
- 1926 – Jimmy Heath, American saxophonist and composer (died 2020)
- 1926 – Galina Vishnevskaya, Russian-American soprano and actress (died 2012)
- 1927 – Barbara Cook, American singer and actress (died 2017)
- 1927 – Jorge Batlle Ibáñez, Uruguayan lawyer and politician, 32nd President of Uruguay (died 2016)
- 1927 – Lawrence Kohlberg, American psychologist and author (died 1987)
- 1927 – Lauretta Masiero, Italian actress and singer (died 2010)
- 1928 – Jeanne Cooper, American actress (died 2013)
- 1928 – Paulo Mendes da Rocha, Brazilian architect (died 2021)
- 1928 – Anthony Franciosa, American actor (died 2006)
- 1928 – Adolphe Gesché, Belgian Catholic priest and theologian (died 2003)
- 1928 – Peter Naur, Danish computer scientist, astronomer, and academic (died 2016)
- 1928 – Marion Ross, American actress
- 1928 – Yakov Rylsky, Soviet sabre fencer (died 1999)
- 1929 – Michel Knuysen, Belgian rower (died 2013)
- 1929 – Zdravko Milev, Bulgarian chess player (died 1984)
- 1929 – Claude Rouer, French cyclist (died 2021)
- 1929 – Peter Rühmkorf, German writer (died 2008)
- 1930 – Harold Brodkey, American author and academic (died 1996)
- 1930 – Karoly Honfi, Hungarian chess player (died 1996)
- 1931 – Annie Girardot, French actress and singer (died 2011)
- 1931 – Jimmy McIlroy, Northern Irish footballer and manager (died 2018)
- 1932 – Vitold Fokin, Ukrainian first deputy prime minister (died 2025)
- 1932 – Jerzy Pawłowski, Polish fencer and double agent (died 2005)
- 1932 – Theodor Pištěk, Czech costume designer (died 2025)
- 1933 – René Brodmann, Swiss footballer (died 2000)
- 1933 – Martti Mansikka, Finnish gymnast (died 2024)
- 1934 – Carlos Sherman, Belarusian–Spanish translator, writer, activist (died 2005)
- 1935 – Rusty Schweickart, American soldier, pilot, and astronaut
- 1936 – Martin Gilbert, English historian, author, and academic (died 2015)
- 1936 – Arnfinn Nesset, Norwegian nurse and convicted serial killer (died 2025)
- 1936 – Masako Nozawa, Japanese actress and singer
- 1937 – Vendramino Bariviera, Italian cyclist (died 2001)
- 1937 – Ignacio Carrasco de Paula, Spanish prelate
- 1937 – Roberto Menescal, Brazilian singer-songwriter, guitarist, and producer
- 1938 – Bob Webster, American diver
- 1939 – Zelmo Beaty, American basketball player and coach (died 2013)
- 1939 – Sara Dylan, American actress and model
- 1939 – Nikolay Kiselyov, Soviet Nordic combined athlete (died 2005)
- 1939 – Nikos Nikolaidis, Greek director, producer, and screenwriter (died 2007)
- 1939 – Dave Simmonds, British motorcycle racer (died 1972)
- 1939 – Robin Spry, Canadian director, producer, and screenwriter (died 2005)
- 1940 – Jimmy Herman, Canadian actor (died 2013)
- 1940 – Bob Knight, American basketball player and coach (died 2023)
- 1941 – Lynda Benglis, American sculptor and painter
- 1941 – Helen Reddy, Australian-American singer-songwriter and actress (died 2020)
- 1941 – Gordon Tootoosis, Aboriginal Canadian actor (died 2011)
- 1941 – Anne Tyler, American author and critic
- 1941 – Dave Weill, American discus thrower
- 1942 – Terumasa Hino, Japanese jazz trumpeter
- 1942 – Gloria Katz, American screenwriter and producer (died 2018)
- 1942 – Franklin Loufrani, French President of the Smiley Company
- 1943 – Orso Maria Guerrini, Italian actor
- 1943 – Roy Lynes, English keyboardist and singer
- 1944 – Azizan Abdul Razak, Malaysian politician, 10th Menteri Besar of Kedah (died 2013)
- 1944 – Jon Anderson, English singer-songwriter and guitarist
- 1944 – James Carville, American lawyer and political consultant
- 1944 – Donald Ford, Scottish footballer
- 1944 – Fred Housego, Scottish-English taxi driver and game show host
- 1944 – Kati Kovács, Hungarian singer-songwriter and actress
- 1944 – Ren Zhengfei, Chinese businessman
- 1945 – Peter Ledger, Australian-American painter and illustrator (died 1994)
- 1945 – Yuriy Meshkov, Ukrainian politician and Russian separatist (died 2019)
- 1945 – Krzysztof Piesiewicz, Polish lawyer, screenwriter and politician (died 2026)
- 1945 – Francisco Sá, Argentine footballer
- 1945 – Phil Volk, American musician, singer-songwriter, and record producer
- 1945 – David S. Ward, American director and screenwriter
- 1945 – Keaton Yamada, Japanese voice actor
- 1946 – Elías Figueroa, Chilean footballer
- 1946 – Peter Lieberson, American composer (died 2011)
- 1947 – Requena Nozal, Spanish artist
- 1947 – Glenn Tipton, English singer-songwriter and guitarist
- 1948 – Dave Cowens, American basketball player and coach
- 1948 – Dan Gable, American wrestler and coach
- 1948 – Dan Issel, American basketball player and coach
- 1948 – Sigleif Johansen, Norwegian biathlete
- 1949 – Réjean Houle, Canadian ice hockey player and manager
- 1949 – Walter Hyatt, American singer-songwriter (died 1996)
- 1949 – Brian Kerwin, American actor
- 1949 – Wilfried Louis, Haitian footballer
- 1950 – Anne Alvaro, French actress
- 1950 – Fernando Arêas Rifan, Brazilian bishop
- 1950 – Roger Davies, English footballer
- 1950 – John Matuszak, American footballer (died 1989)
- 1950 – Francisco Oscar Lamolina, Argentine football referee
- 1950 – Chris Norman, English singer-songwriter
- 1951 – Richard Lloyd, American singer-songwriter and guitarist (died 2026)
- 1952 – Samir Geagea, Lebanese commander and politician
- 1952 – Wendy Hall, English computer scientist, mathematician, and academic
- 1952 – Ioannis Kyrastas, Greek footballer and manager (died 2004)
- 1952 – Tove Nilsen, Norwegian author
- 1953 – Daniele Bagnoli, Italian volleyball coach
- 1953 – Jasem Yaqoub, Kuwaiti footballer
- 1954 – Mike Eruzione, American ice hockey player and coach
- 1954 – Ed Powers, American founder of Ed Powers Productions
- 1955 – Glynis Barber, South African-English actress
- 1955 – Robin Eubanks, American trombonist and educator
- 1955 – Gale Anne Hurd, American producer
- 1955 – Matthias Jabs, German guitarist and songwriter
- 1955 – Leena Lander, Finnish author
- 1955 – Lito Lapid, Filipino actor
- 1956 – Stephen Leather, British author
- 1957 – Nancy Cartwright, American voice actress
- 1957 – Enrique López Zarza, Mexican footballer
- 1957 – Robbie McIntosh, English guitarist
- 1957 – Piet Wildschut, Dutch footballer
- 1958 – Kornelia Ender, East German swimmer
- 1958 – Kjell Inge Røkke, Norwegian businessman and philanthropist
- 1959 – Óscar Aguirregaray, Uruguayan footballer
- 1959 – Chrissy Amphlett, Australian singer-songwriter and actress (died 2013)
- 1960 – Hong Sang-soo, South Korean director and screenwriter
- 1961 – John Sivebæk, Danish footballer
- 1961 – Chad Smith, American drummer
- 1962 – David Furnish, Canadian filmmaker
- 1962 – Steve Gainer, American cinematographer and director
- 1962 – Steve Hodge, English footballer and manager
- 1962 – John Stollmeyer, American soccer player
- 1963 – John Levén, Swedish bassist
- 1963 – Michael Lynagh, Australian rugby union footballer
- 1963 – Melinda McGraw, American actress
- 1963 – Tracy Nelson, American actress
- 1963 – José Ortiz, Puerto Rican basketball player (died 2026)
- 1964 – Michael Boatman, American actor
- 1964 – Johan de Kock, Dutch footballer
- 1964 – Nicole, German singer
- 1964 – Kevin Michael Richardson, American voice actor and singer
- 1965 – 2 Cold Scorpio, American wrestler
- 1965 – Mathieu Amalric, French actor and director
- 1965 – Valdir Benedito, Brazilian footballer
- 1965 – Claire Colebrook, Australian philosopher, theorist, and academic
- 1965 – Dominique Herr, Swiss footballer
- 1965 – Derrick Rostagno, American tennis player
- 1965 – Rainer Strecker, German actor
- 1965 – Karl Malin, Austrian politician
- 1966 – Zana Briski, British photographer and filmmaker
- 1966 – Lionel Charbonnier, French footballer
- 1966 – Wendel Clark, Canadian ice hockey player
- 1966 – Perry Saturn, American wrestler
- 1967 – Martin Marinov, Australian canoeist
- 1967 – Taiyō Matsumoto, Japanese manga artist
- 1967 – Gary Sundgren, Swedish footballer
- 1968 – Doris Fitschen, German footballer
- 1968 – Christopher McQuarrie, American filmmaker
- 1968 – Speech, American rapper
- 1969 – Samantha Bee, Canadian-American comedian and television host
- 1969 – Josef Beránek, Czech ice hockey player and coach
- 1969 – Slavko Cicak, Swedish chess Grandmaster
- 1969 – Nika Futterman, American voice actress, comedian and singer
- 1969 – Ibragim Gasanbekov, Azerbaijani footballer
- 1969 – Oleg Salenko, Russian footballer
- 1969 – Alex Webster, American bass player
- 1970 – J. A. Adande, American journalist and academic
- 1970 – Peter Aerts, Dutch kick-boxer and mixed martial artist
- 1970 – Adam Goldberg, American actor, director, producer, and screenwriter
- 1970 – Damir Mršić, Bosnian basketball player
- 1970 – Adam Pascal, American actor and singer
- 1970 – Rafa, Spanish footballer
- 1970 – Ed Robertson, Canadian singer-songwriter, guitarist, and producer
- 1970 – Daniel Scheinhardt, German footballer
- 1970 – Chely Wright, American singer-songwriter and actress
- 1971 – Simon Charlton, English footballer and manager
- 1971 – Athena Chu, Hong Kong actress and singer
- 1971 – Neil Fallon, American singer-songwriter and guitarist
- 1971 – Leslie Grossman, American actress
- 1971 – Rosie Ledet, American singer-songwriter and accordion player
- 1971 – Pedro Martínez, Dominican-American baseball player and sportscaster
- 1971 – Midori, Japanese-American violinist and educator
- 1971 – Craig Robinson, American actor and singer
- 1971 – Elif Şafak, French-Turkish journalist, author, and academic
- 1972 – Cristian Dulca, Romanian footballer
- 1972 – Rodolfo Falcón, Cuban swimmer
- 1972 – Maxi Mounds, American nude big-bust model and pornographic actress
- 1972 – Jonathan Torrens, Canadian actor, producer, and screenwriter
- 1972 – Persia White, American actress, singer, and musician
- 1973 – Fırat Aydınus, Turkish football referee
- 1973 – Lamont Bentley, American actor and rapper (died 2005)
- 1973 – Michael Weston, American actor
- 1974 – Lee Byung-kyu, South Korean baseball player
- 1974 – Yoo Yong-sung, South Korean badminton player
- 1975 – Eirik Glambek Bøe, Norwegian singer-songwriter and guitarist
- 1975 – Ryan Clement, American football player
- 1975 – Agustín Julio, Colombian footballer
- 1975 – Zadie Smith, English author and academic
- 1975 – Antony Starr, New Zealand actor
- 1976 – Deon Burton, Jamaican footballer
- 1976 – Ahmed Dokhi, Saudi Arabian footballer
- 1976 – Akihisa Ikeda, Japanese manga artist
- 1976 – Steve Jones, Northern Irish footballer
- 1976 – Brett Kirk, Australian footballer and coach
- 1976 – Anton Sikharulidze, Russian pair skater
- 1977 – The Alchemist, American rapper, DJ, and producer
- 1977 – Rodolfo Bodipo, Equatoguinean retired footballer
- 1977 – Mitică Pricop, Romanian sprint canoer
- 1977 – Birgit Prinz, German footballer and psychologist
- 1977 – Rakan Rushaidat, Croatian actor
- 1977 – Kateryna Serebrianska, Ukrainian gymnast
- 1977 – Mihai Tararache, Romanian footballer
- 1977 – Yeho, Israeli singer and actor
- 1978 – Russell Anderson, Scottish footballer
- 1978 – Zachary Knighton, American actor
- 1978 – Bobby Madden, Scottish football referee
- 1978 – Robert Mambo Mumba, Kenyan footballer
- 1978 – Markus Pöyhönen, Finnish sprinter
- 1978 – An Yong-hak, North Korean footballer
- 1979 – Bat for Lashes, English singer
- 1979 – Rob Hulse, English footballer
- 1979 – Mariana Klaveno, American actress
- 1979 – João Lucas, Portuguese footballer (died 2015)
- 1979 – Rosa Mendes, Canadian-American wrestler and model
- 1980 – Mehcad Brooks, American model and actor
- 1980 – Félicien Singbo, Beninois footballer
- 1981 – Hiroshi Aoyama, Japanese motorcycle racer
- 1981 – Josh Henderson, American actor and singer
- 1981 – Shaun Wright-Phillips, English footballer
- 1982 – Victoria Francés, Spanish illustrator
- 1982 – Devin Green, American basketball player
- 1982 – Guido Grünheid, German basketball player
- 1982 – Camilla Jensen, Danish curler
- 1982 – Michael Sweetney, American basketball player
- 1982 – Mickaël Tavares, Senegalese footballer
- 1983 – Hotaru Akane, Japanese actress and activist (died 2016)
- 1983 – Stanislav Bohush, Ukrainian footballer
- 1983 – Daniele Mannini, Italian footballer
- 1983 – Princess Yōko of Mikasa
- 1983 – Han Yeo-reum, South Korean actress
- 1984 – Nicolas Besch, French ice hockey player
- 1984 – Ticia Gara, Hungarian chess player
- 1984 – Sara Lumholdt, Swedish singer and dancer
- 1984 – Katy Perry, American singer-songwriter and actress
- 1984 – Iván Ramis, Spanish footballer
- 1984 – Karolina Šprem, Croatian tennis player
- 1985 – Ciara, American singer-songwriter, dancer, and actress
- 1985 – Óscar Granados, Costa Rican footballer
- 1985 – Kara Lynn Joyce, American swimmer
- 1985 – Daniele Padelli, Italian footballer
- 1986 – Tweety Carter, American basketball player
- 1986 – Roger Espinoza, Honduran footballer
- 1986 – Eddie Gaven, American soccer player
- 1986 – Kristian Sarkies, Australian footballer
- 1986 – Ekaterina Shumilova, Russian biathlete
- 1987 – Bill Amis, American basketball player
- 1987 – Darron Gibson, Irish footballer
- 1987 – Fabian Hambüchen, German gymnast
- 1988 – Robson Conceição, Brazilian boxer
- 1988 – Lewis McGugan, English professional footballer
- 1988 – Chandler Parsons, American basketball player
- 1988 – Kaz Patafta, Australian footballer
- 1988 – Karim Yoda, French footballer
- 1989 – Filip Grgić, Croatian taekwondo practitioner
- 1989 – Sten Grytebust, Norwegian footballer
- 1989 – David Hala, Australian rugby league player
- 1989 – Ivan Marconi, Italian footballer
- 1989 – Mia Wasikowska, Australian actress
- 1990 – Mattia Cattaneo, Italian cyclist
- 1990 – Sara Chafak, Finnish beauty pageant winner
- 1990 – Asha Philip, British athlete
- 1990 – Milena Rašić, Serbian volleyball player
- 1990 – Dzina Sazanavets, Belarusian weightlifter
- 1991 – Davide Faraoni, Italian footballer
- 1991 – Isabella Shinikova, Bulgarian tennis player
- 1992 – Ayça Ayşin Turan, Turkish actress
- 1992 – Clarisse Agbegnenou, French judoka
- 1992 – Davide Formolo, Italian cyclist
- 1992 – Sergey Ridzik, Russian freestyle skier
- 1993 – Isaiah Austin, American basketball player
- 1993 – Iván Garcia, Mexican diver
- 1993 – William Howard, French basketball player
- 1993 – Rachel Matthews, American actress
- 1993 – Zeno Robinson, American voice actor
- 1994 – Richard Jouve, French cross-country skier
- 1994 – Jefferson Lerma, Colombian footballer
- 1994 – Matteo Lodo, Italian rower
- 1994 – Gor Minasyan, Armenian weightlifter
- 1994 – Ray Robson, American chess Grandmaster
- 1995 – Conchita Campbell, Canadian actress
- 1995 – Jock Landale, Australian basketball player
- 1995 – Patrick McCaw, American basketball player
- 1996 – PJ Dozier, American basketball player
- 1997 – Federico Chiesa, Italian footballer
- 1998 – Juan Soto, Dominican baseball player
- 1998 – Lee Know, South Korean singer
- 1999 – Clara Soccini, Italian singer-songwriter, actress and model
- 1999 – Romeo Langford, American basketball player
- 2000 – Dominik Szoboszlai, Hungarian footballer
- 2000 – Vincent Zhou, American figure skater
- 2001 – Princess Elisabeth, Duchess of Brabant

== Deaths ==
=== Pre-1600 ===
- 625 – Pope Boniface V
- 912 – Rudolph I, king of Burgundy (born 859)
- 1047 – Magnus the Good, Norwegian king (born 1024)
- 1053 – Enguerrand II, Count of Ponthieu
- 1154 – Stephen, King of England
- 1180 – John of Salisbury, French bishop (born c. 1120)
- 1200 – Conrad of Wittelsbach, German cardinal (born 1120)
- 1230 – Gilbert de Clare, 5th Earl of Gloucester, English soldier (born 1180)
- 1292 – Robert Burnell, Lord Chancellor of England
- 1349 – James III of Majorca (born 1315)
- 1359 – Beatrice of Castile, queen consort of Portugal (born 1293)
- 1400 – Geoffrey Chaucer, English philosopher, poet, and author (born c. 1343)
- 1415 – Charles I of Albret
- 1415 – Philip II, Count of Nevers (born 1389)
- 1415 – Frederick I, Count of Vaudémont (born 1371)
- 1415 – Jean I, Duke of Alençon (born 1385)
- 1415 – Anthony, Duke of Brabant (born 1384)
- 1415 – Michael de la Pole, 3rd Earl of Suffolk, English soldier (born 1394)
- 1415 – Edward of Norwich, 2nd Duke of York, English politician (born 1373)
- 1415 – Dafydd Gam, Welsh nobleman (born c. 1380)
- 1478 – Catherine of Bosnia (born 1425)
- 1492 – Thaddeus McCarthy, Irish bishop (born 1455)
- 1495 – John II of Portugal (born 1455)
- 1514 – William Elphinstone, Scottish bishop and academic, founded University of Aberdeen (born 1431)
- 1557 – William Cavendish, English courtier and civil servant (born 1505)

=== 1601–1900 ===
- 1647 – Evangelista Torricelli, Italian physicist and mathematician (born 1608)
- 1651 – Saint Job of Pochayiv, Ukrainian Orthodox Christian saint (born 1551)
- 1683 – William Scroggs, English judge and politician, Lord Chief Justice of England and Wales (born 1623)
- 1733 – Giovanni Girolamo Saccheri, Italian priest, mathematician, and philosopher (born 1667)
- 1757 – Antoine Augustin Calmet, French monk and theologian (born 1672)
- 1760 – George II of Great Britain (born 1683)
- 1806 – Henry Knox, American general and politician, 2nd United States Secretary of War (born 1750)
- 1826 – Philippe Pinel, French physician and psychiatrist (born 1745)
- 1833 – Abbas Mirza, Persian prince (born 1789)
- 1852 – John C. Clark, American lawyer and politician (born 1793)
- 1889 – Émile Augier, French playwright (born 1820)
- 1895 – Charles Hallé, German-English pianist and conductor (born 1819)

=== 1901–present ===
- 1902 – Frank Norris, American journalist and novelist (born 1870)
- 1910 – Willie Anderson, Scottish-American golfer (born 1878)
- 1916 – William Merritt Chase, American painter and educator (born 1849)
- 1919 – William Kidston, Scottish-Australian politician, 17th Premier of Queensland (born 1849)
- 1920 – Alexander of Greece (born 1893)
- 1920 – Terence MacSwiney, Irish playwright, politician, Lord Mayor of Cork died on hunger strike (born 1879)
- 1920 – Joe Murphy, (Irish-American), died on hunger strike during the 1920 Cork hunger strike (born 1895)
- 1921 – Bat Masterson, American lawman, buffalo hunter, and sport writer (born 1853)
- 1924 – Ziya Gökalp, Turkish sociologist, poet, and activist (born 1876)
- 1938 – Alfonsina Storni, Swiss-Argentinian poet and author (born 1892)
- 1940 – Thomas Waddell, Irish-Australian politician, 15th Premier of New South Wales (born 1854)
- 1941 – Franz von Werra, Swiss-German captain and pilot (born 1914)
- 1945 – Robert Ley, German politician (born 1890)
- 1949 – Mary Acworth Orr Evershed, English astronomer and Dante scholar (born 1867)
- 1953 – Holger Pedersen, Danish linguist and academic (born 1867)
- 1954 – Purshottam Narayan Gadgil, Indian jeweller and namesake of P. N. Gadgil Jewellers (born 1874)
- 1955 – Sadako Sasaki, Japanese girl (born 1943)
- 1956 – Risto Ryti, Finnish lawyer, politician and Governor of the Bank of Finland; 5th President of Finland (born 1889)
- 1957 – Albert Anastasia, Italian-American mob boss (born 1902)
- 1957 – Edward Plunkett, 18th Baron of Dunsany, English-Irish author, poet, and playwright (born 1878)
- 1960 – Harry Ferguson, Irish-English engineer, founded the Ferguson Company (born 1884)
- 1963 – Roger Désormière, French conductor and composer (born 1898)
- 1967 – Margaret Ayer Barnes, American author and playwright (born 1886)
- 1969 – Ellinor Aiki, Estonian painter (born 1893)
- 1970 – Ülo Sooster, Estonian painter (born 1924)
- 1971 – Mikhail Yangel, Soviet missile designer (born 1911)
- 1972 – Johnny Mantz, American race car driver (born 1918)
- 1973 – Abebe Bikila, Ethiopian runner (born 1932)
- 1973 – Cleo Moore, American actress (born 1928)
- 1973 – Robert Scholl, German accountant and politician (born 1891)
- 1975 – Vladimir Herzog, Brazilian journalist and activist (born 1937)
- 1976 – Raymond Queneau, French poet and author (born 1903)
- 1977 – Félix Gouin, French politician (born 1884)
- 1979 – Gerald Templer, English field marshal and politician, British High Commissioner in Malaya (born 1898)
- 1980 – Virgil Fox, American organist and educator (born 1912)
- 1980 – Víctor Galíndez, Argentine boxer (born 1948)
- 1980 – Sahir Ludhianvi, Indian poet and songwriter (born 1921)
- 1982 – Bill Eckersley, English footballer (born 1925)
- 1982 – Arvid Wallman, Swedish diver (born 1901)
- 1985 – Gary Holton, English singer-songwriter (born 1952)
- 1986 – Forrest Tucker, American actor (born 1919)
- 1989 – Mary McCarthy, American novelist and critic (born 1912)
- 1990 – Alberto da Costa Pereira, Portuguese footballer (born 1929)
- 1991 – Bill Graham, German-American concert promoter (born 1931)
- 1992 – Roger Miller, American singer-songwriter and actor (born 1936)
- 1992 – Richard Pousette-Dart, American painter and educator (born 1916)
- 1993 – Danny Chan, Hong Kong singer-songwriter, producer, and actor (born 1958)
- 1993 – Vincent Price, American actor (born 1911)
- 1994 – Kara Hultgreen, American lieutenant and pilot (born 1965)
- 1994 – Mildred Natwick, American actress (born 1905)
- 1995 – Viveca Lindfors, Swedish actress (born 1920)
- 1995 – Bobby Riggs, American tennis player (born 1918)
- 1999 – Leonard Boyle, Irish and Canadian palaeographer and medievalist (born 1923)
- 1999 – Payne Stewart, American golfer (born 1957)
- 2000 – Mochitsura Hashimoto, Japanese commander (born 1909)
- 2002 – Richard Harris, Irish actor and singer (born 1930)
- 2002 – René Thom, French mathematician and biologist (born 1923)
- 2002 – Paul Wellstone, American academic and politician (born 1944)
- 2003 – Pandurang Shastri Athavale, Indian spiritual leader and philosopher (born 1920)
- 2003 – Veikko Hakulinen, Finnish skier and technician (born 1925)
- 2004 – John Peel, English radio host and producer (born 1939)
- 2010 – Lisa Blount, American actress (born 1957)
- 2010 – Gregory Isaacs, Jamaican-English singer-songwriter (born 1951)
- 2010 – Vesna Parun, Croatian poet and author (born 1922)
- 2012 – Jacques Barzun, French-American historian and author (born 1907)
- 2012 – Jaspal Bhatti, Indian actor, director, producer, and screenwriter (born 1955)
- 2012 – John Connelly, English footballer (born 1938)
- 2012 – Emanuel Steward, American boxer, trainer, and sportscaster (born 1944)
- 2013 – Ron Ackland, New Zealand rugby player and coach (born 1934)
- 2013 – Arthur Danto, American philosopher and critic (born 1924)
- 2013 – Nicholas Hunt, Welsh-English admiral (born 1930)
- 2013 – Hal Needham, American actor, stuntman, director, and screenwriter (born 1931)
- 2013 – Paul Reichmann, Austrian-Canadian businessman, founded Olympia and York (born 1930)
- 2013 – Bill Sharman, American basketball player and coach (born 1926)
- 2013 – Marcia Wallace, American actress and comedian (born 1942)
- 2014 – Jack Bruce, Scottish singer-songwriter and bass player (born 1943)
- 2014 – Carlos Morales Troncoso, Dominican lawyer and politician, 34th Vice President of the Dominican Republic (born 1940)
- 2015 – David Cesarani, English historian and author (born 1956)
- 2015 – Lisa Jardine, English historian, author, and academic (born 1944)
- 2015 – Cecil Lolo, South African footballer (born 1988)
- 2015 – Flip Saunders, American basketball player and coach (born 1955)
- 2016 – Carlos Alberto Torres, Brazilian football player and manager (born 1944)
- 2016 – Bob Hoover, USAF, Test, and Airshow pilot (born 1922)
- 2018 – Thomas Keating, American Trappist monk and a principal developer of Centering Prayer (born 1923)
- 2019 – Dilip Parikh, Indian politician (born 1937)
- 2024 – Phil Lesh, American bassist (born 1940)
- 2024 – Kim Soo-mi, South Korean actress (born 1949)
- 2025 – Satish Shah, Indian actor and comedian (born 1951)
- 2025 – Rolf Dupuy, anarchist and historian of the anarchist movement in France and Spain (born 1946)
- 2026 – Eric Bauza, Canadian-American voice actor and comedian (born 1979)

== Holidays and observances ==
- Armed Forces Day (Romania)
- Christian feast day:
  - Bernat Calbó (Bernard of Calvo)
  - Canna
  - Blessed Carlo Gnocchi
  - Crysanthus and Daria (Western Christianity)
  - Crispin and Crispinian
  - Fructus
  - Gaudentius of Brescia
  - Goeznovius
  - María Teresa Ferragut Roig and four of her daughters
  - Maurus of Pécs
  - Minias of Florence
  - Mar Nestorius (in the Nestorian churches)
  - Tabitha (Dorcas)
  - Tegulus
  - Blessed Thaddeus McCarthy
  - The Six Welsh Martyrs and companions (in Wales)
  - The Hallowing of Nestorius
  - October 25 (Eastern Orthodox liturgics)
- Day of the Basque Country (Basque Country)
- Republic Day (Kazakhstan)
- Retrocession Day and the memorial day for the Battle of Guningtou (Taiwan)
- Sovereignty Day (Slovenia)
- Thanksgiving Day (Grenada)
