= Helios Airways =

Cypriot airline

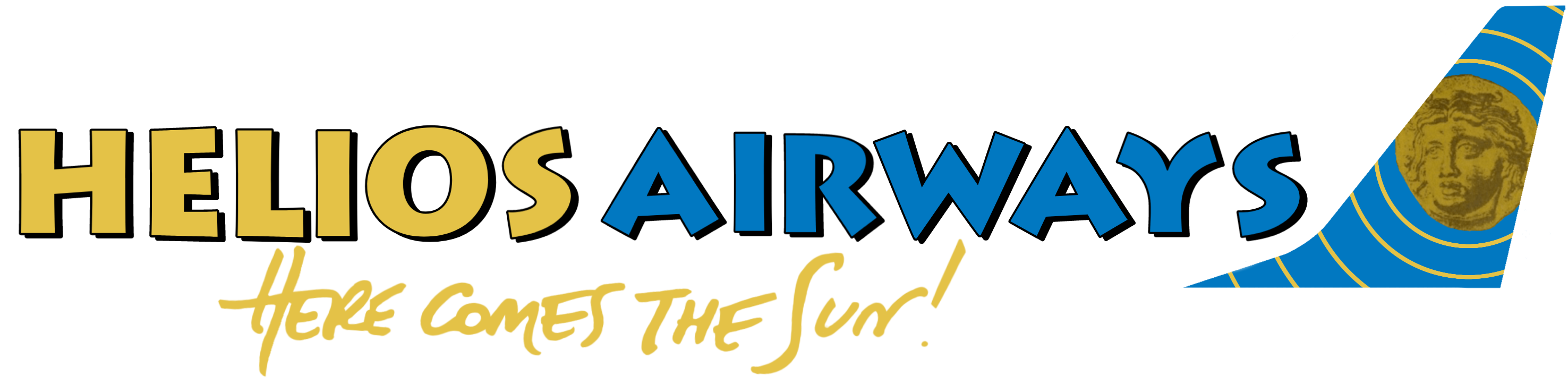

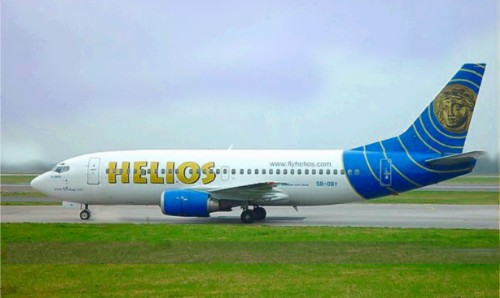
IATA	ICAO	Call sign
ZU	HCY	HELIOS
- Founded: September 23, 1998; 27 years ago
- Ceased operations: November 6, 2006; 19 years ago
- Hubs: Larnaca International Airport; Paphos International Airport
- Fleet size: 3
- Destinations: 18
- Parent company: TEA Cyprus (1998-2004); Libra Holidays Group (2004-2006)
- Headquarters: Larnaca International Airport, Cyprus
- Key people: Bryan Field (MD)
- Website: www.flyhelios.com

Helios Airways was a Cypriot low-cost airline operating scheduled and charter flights between Cyprus and many European and African destinations. It had its corporate headquarters on the grounds of Larnaca International Airport in Larnaca, which was its main base.

The deadliest aviation accident to take place in Greece, Helios Airways Flight 522, which crashed into a hillside in Grammatiko in 2005, began deteriorating the company's reputation. After the air carrier had changed name to Ajet, its services ceased on 7 November 2006 because the company's aircraft were detained, and its bank accounts were frozen by the government of Cyprus due to its poor reputation after the disaster.

== History ==
Helios Airways was established on 23 September 1998, formed by the owners of TEA (Cyprus), a Cypriot offshore air operator specialising in Boeing 737 wet leases worldwide, and was the first independent, privately owned airline in Cyprus. On 15 May 2000, it operated its first charter flight to Gatwick Airport. Originally, it offered charter services to destinations including Athens, London, Manchester, Amsterdam, Edinburgh, Prague, Sofia, Bournemouth, Cairo, Paris, Dublin and Warsaw. Scheduled operations were launched on 5 April 2001. Helios Airways was acquired in 2004 by the Libra Holidays Group, of Limassol, Cyprus.

On 14 March 2006, it was announced that Helios Airways would be rebranded Ajet and would halt scheduled operations. On 30 October 2006, responding to rumors, Ajet announced that it was to cease operations over the period of the following 90 days. In light of that, the Cyprus Government demanded that back taxes be paid immediately. Also, private suppliers demanded that they be paid in cash for any further goods and services provided to the company. On 31 October 2006, the airline announced that it would cease operations in the following days.

All Ajet own flights were suspended from 1 November 2006, and the majority of its schedules were taken over by the charter carrier XL Airways UK (which itself went out of business in September 2008). According to the owners, Libra Holidays, the decision to cease operations was due to poor financial results and pressure from creditors. On 11 November, the company website announced that the government of the Republic of Cyprus had "illegally blocked Ajet’s aircraft and frozen the Company’s bank accounts", which was in "direct contravention to the successful appeal lodged by Ajet in the District Court, causing substantial financial damage to the Company". As a result, Ajet announced that all flights to be flown by other carriers would no longer be operated as of Monday, November 6 2006, and that passengers would therefore have to make their own arrangements.

== Fleet ==
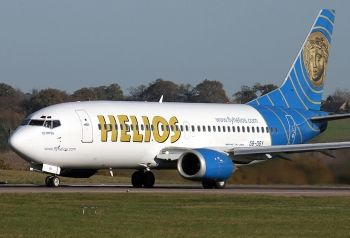
5B-DBY at Luton Airport (2004). This aircraft crashed as Flight 522 from Larnaca to Athens.

When the airline ceased operating, the jet fleet consisted of the following aircraft:

- 3 × Boeing 737-800

=== Aircraft operated ===
The airline had also operated the following aircraft:

- 1 × Airbus A319-100 (2005), leased from Lotus Air
- 1 × Airbus A320-200 (2005), leased from MenaJet
- 1 × Boeing 737-300 (2004-2005), crashed in Flight 522
- 1 × Boeing 737-400 (2000-2001)

== Destinations ==
- Larnaca (HQ)
- Paphos (secondary base)
- Athens
- London Luton
- London Heathrow
- Manchester
- Stockholm Arlanda Airport
- Amsterdam
- Edinburgh
- Prague
- Sofia
- Bournemouth
- Cairo
- Paris Charles de Gaulle
- Dublin
- Warsaw
- Glasgow
- Newcastle
- Teesside

== Accident ==
- On 14 August 2005, Helios Airways Flight 522, a Boeing 737-300 flying from Larnaca to Prague via Athens, crashed near Grammatiko, Greece. The flight crew had become incapacitated shortly after takeoff from Larnaca, owing to a loss of cabin pressure. The autopilot entered a holding pattern over Athens and the aircraft began to descend after the fuel was exhausted, crashing into hilly terrain about 40 km north of Athens International Airport. All 121 passengers and crew were killed in the accident. The investigation concluded that both maintenance crews and the pilots had failed to ensure the pressurization system was set to "automatic", and as a result, the plane never pressurized. The accident revealed many problems with safety of the airline and led to manslaughter charges against five airline officials.
