= Airport slot =

Permission to use airport infrastructure

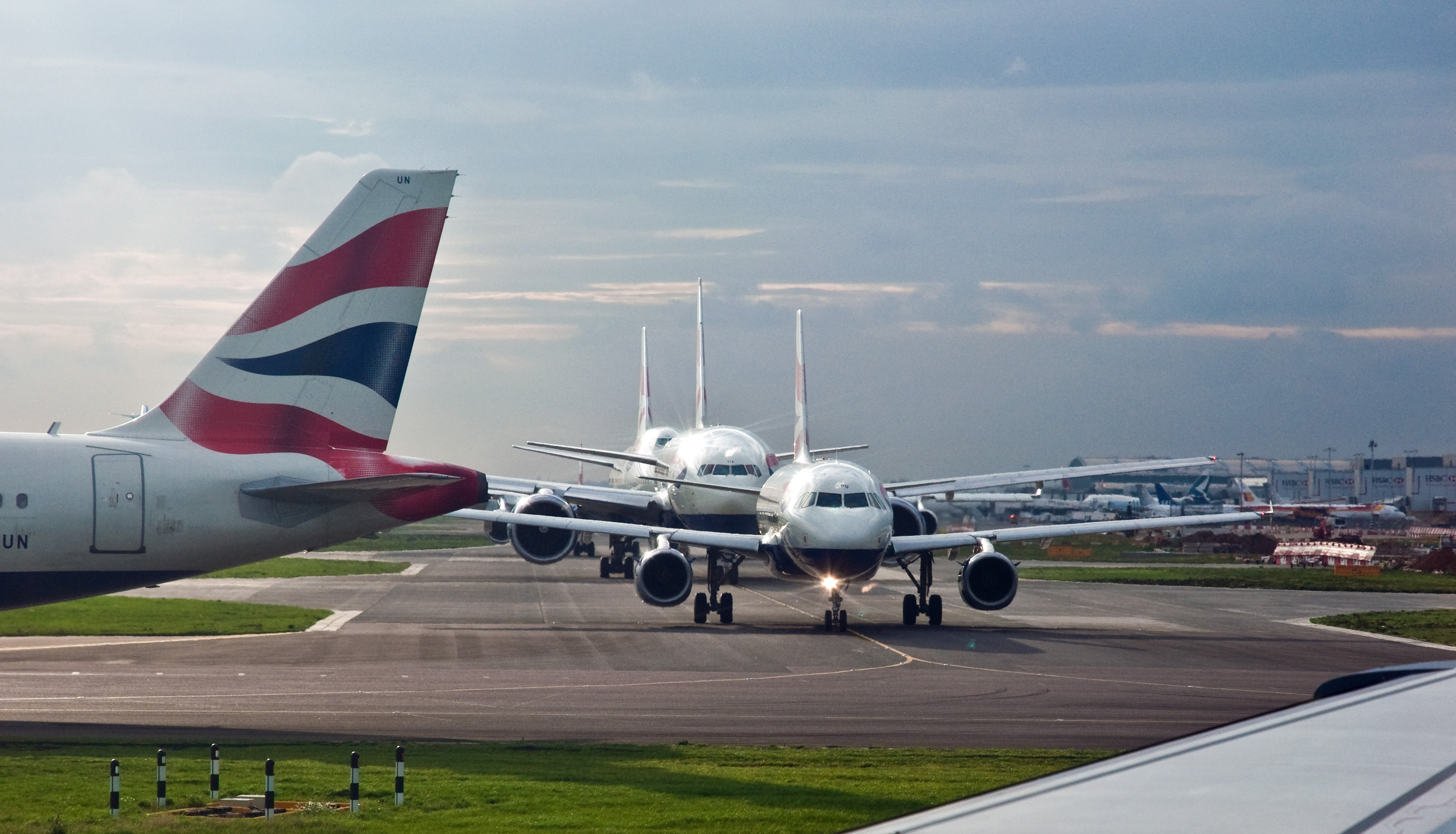
Planes queued up for takeoff

A landing slot, takeoff slot, or airport slot is a permission granted by a slot coordinator to use the infrastructure of an airport designated as Level 3 (Coordinated Airport) for take-off and/or landing at a specific time and date. Slots should be administered by an independent slot coordinator, often a government aviation regulator such as the U.S. Federal Aviation Administration. In some countries, airport operators are appointed as coordinators even though they are interested parties.

Slots are allocated in accordance with guidelines set down by the Worldwide Airport Slot Board with 7 members each from International Air Transport Association (IATA), Airport Council International (ACI) and the Worldwide Airport Coordinator Group (WWACG). All airports worldwide are categorized as either Level 1 (Non-Coordinated Airport), Level 2 (Schedules Facilitated Airport), or Level 3 (Coordinated Airport). At Level 2 airports, the principles governing slot allocation are less stringent; airlines periodically submit proposed schedules to the administrating authority, rather than historic performance. Participation is not mandatory, but reduces congestion and non-participants are penalized if the airport must later be designated level 3.

As of the summer 2022 scheduled season, a total of 156 airports in the world are Level 2 airports, and 195 are Level 3 airports.

If an airline does not use an allocation of slots (typically 80% usage over six months), it can lose the rights. Airlines may operate ghost or empty flights to preserve slot allocations. To avoid pollution and financial losses caused by an excessive number of empty flights, these rules have occasionally been waived during periods of temporary but widespread travel disruption, including after the September 11, 2001 attacks and during the SARS epidemic, the Great Recession, and the COVID-19 pandemic. Maintenance of the rules forces airlines to schedule extra unnecessary flights to keep their slots, wasting fuel; a 2021 expiration of a waiver in the United States was projected to cause 20,000 tons of carbon dioxide emissions per day.

== At Heathrow Airport ==
Allocated landing slots may have a commercial value and can be traded between airlines. In 2008 Continental Airlines paid US$209 million for four pairs of landing slots from GB Airways at London Heathrow Airport, $52.3m each. The highest price paid for a pair of take-off and landing slots at Heathrow Airport was $75m, paid by Oman Air to Air France–KLM for a prized early morning arrival, reported in February 2016. A year before, American Airlines paid $60m to Scandinavian Airlines. As supply is limited, slot trading became the main solution to enter Heathrow and transfers grew from 42 in 2000 to 526 in 2012 and over 10 years the average priced slot was equivalent to £4 per passenger.

Heathrow slot valuations
| Year | Buyer | Seller | daily slot pairs | transaction (£M) | slot value (£M) |
|---|---|---|---|---|---|
| 1998 | BA | Air UK | 4 | 15.6 | 3.9 |
| 2002 | BA | BA Connect | 5 | 13 | 2.6 |
| 2002 | BA | SN Brussels | 7 | 27.5 | 3.9 |
| 2003 | BA | SWISS | 8 | 22.5 | 2.8 |
| 2003 | BA | United | 2 | 12 | 6 |
| 2004 | Virgin | Flybe | 4 | 20 | 5 |
| 2004 | Qantas | Flybe | 2 | 20 | 10 |
| 2006 | BA | BWIA | 1 | 5 | 5 |
| 2007 | BA | Malev | 2 | 7 | 3.5 |
| 2007 | BA | BA | 7.3 | 30 | 4.1 |
| 2007 | Virgin | Air Jamaica | 1 | 5.1 | 5.1 |
| 2007 | BMI | | 77.7 | 770 | 9.9 |
| 2007 | unknown | Alitalia | 3 | 67 | 22.3 |
| 2008 | Continental | GB Airways/Alitalia/Air France | 4 | 104.5 | 26.1 |
| 2013 | Delta | unknown | 2 | 30.8 | 15.4 |
| 2013 | Etihad | Jet | 3 | 46.2 | 15.4 |

== Reform ==
In the United Kingdom, the Department for Transport has stated the slot system "is not designed to stimulate a competitive market environment and has no means of taking into account broader objectives". Reform could make the system more efficient, competitive and environmentally friendly.

== See also ==
- List of cities with more than one commercial airport
