= Bruce Borland =

American golf course designer (1958–1999)

- Born: November 4, 1958; Peoria, Illinois, U.S.
- Died: October 25, 1999 (aged 40) over Mina, South Dakota, U.S.
- Occupation: Golf course designer

Bruce Borland (November 4, 1958 – October 25, 1999) was an American golf course designer who worked for Jack Nicklaus. He died in the 1999 South Dakota Learjet crash on October 25, 1999, while traveling with golf Hall of Famer Payne Stewart.

== Early life and education ==
Borland was raised in the Peoria, Illinois, area. He took a fascination with golf at an early age, building and maintaining a putting green in his parents' backyard, tending to it meticulously. Borland went on to graduate from the University of Illinois at Urbana-Champaign, with a degree in Landscape Architecture.

== Career ==
After graduation, he moved to the Chicago area and began designing golf courses for several firms.

In 1989, Borland opened his own design firm, ProDesign, just a year later he was offered a design position with Jack Nicklaus at Golden Bear International. Borland worked on many of the famous Jack Nicklaus "Signature" golf courses, as well as other stateside and Indonesian courses.

Over his career, Borland designed or worked on several golf courses.

== Death ==
In 1999, Borland was killed in a Learjet 35 with Payne Stewart while flying from Orlando, Florida, to Dallas, Texas, before the Tour Championship. He died of hypoxia, a lack of oxygen, before the plane crashed.
