= Helios Airways Flight 522 =

2005 aviation accident in Greece

- Flight path from Larnaca to Athens

Accident
- Date: 14 August 2005
- Summary: Crew incapacitation due to loss of pressurization, leading to fuel exhaustion
- Site: Grammatiko, Greece; 38°13′52″N 23°58′16″E

Aircraft
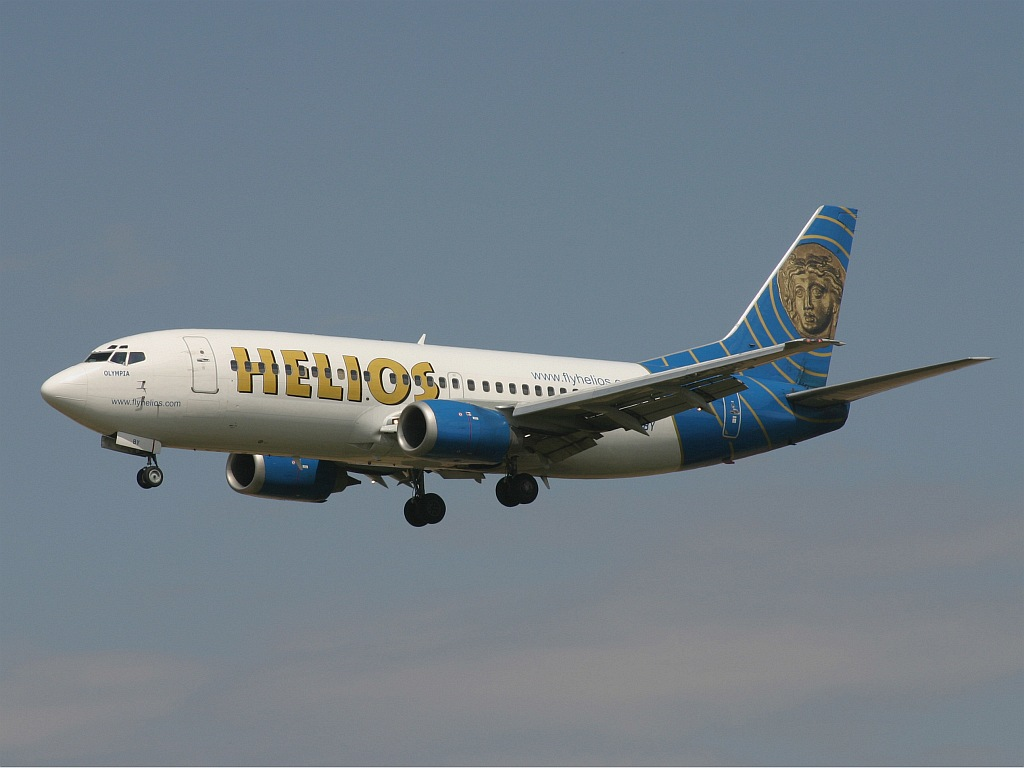
- 5B-DBY, the aircraft involved, photographed just three days prior to the accident
- Aircraft type: Boeing 737-31S
- Aircraft name: Olympia
- Operator: Helios Airways
- IATA flight No.: ZU522
- ICAO flight No.: HCY522
- Call sign: HELIOS 522
- Registration: 5B-DBY
- Flight origin: Larnaca International Airport, Cyprus
- Stopover: Athens International Airport, Greece
- Destination: Prague Ruzyně International Airport, Czech Republic
- Occupants: 121
- Passengers: 115
- Crew: 6
- Fatalities: 121
- Survivors: 0

Helios Airways Flight 522 was a scheduled international passenger flight from Larnaca, Cyprus, to Prague, Czech Republic, with a stopover in Athens, Greece, operated by a Boeing 737-300. Shortly after takeoff on 14 August 2005, Nicosia air traffic control (ATC) lost contact with the pilots operating the flight; it eventually crashed near Grammatiko, Greece. All 121 passengers and crew on board were killed. It is the deadliest aviation accident in Greek history.

An investigation into the accident by Greece's Air Accident Investigation and Aviation Safety Board (AAIASB) concluded that the crew had failed to notice that the cabin pressurization system was set to "manual" during takeoff checks. A ground engineer had set it to "manual" to conduct testing before the flight, but had most likely forgotten to restore it to "auto" afterward. This configuration was subsequently missed by the crew during their pre-flight checks. This caused the plane to gradually depressurize as it climbed, and resulted in everyone on board suffering from critical hypoxia. The negligent nature of the accident led to lawsuits being filed against Helios Airways and Boeing, with the former also being shut down by the Government of Cyprus the following year.

== Background ==
=== Aircraft ===
The aircraft involved, manufactured in 1998, was a Boeing 737-300 registered as 5B-DBY. The aircraft was powered by two CFM International CFM56-3C1 engines.

The aircraft had arrived at Larnaca International Airport from London Heathrow Airport at 01:25 local time on the day of the accident. It was scheduled to leave Larnaca at 09:00 and fly to Prague Ruzyně International Airport, with a stop off at Athens International Airport, where it was due to arrive at 10:45.

=== Flight crew ===
In command was Captain Hans-Jürgen Merten, a 59-year-old German contract pilot hired by Helios for holiday flights, who had been flying for 35 years (previously for East German airline Interflug from 1970 to 1991) and had accrued a total of 16,900 flight hours, including 5,500 hours on the Boeing 737. The first officer was Pampos Charalambous (Greek: Πάμπος Χαραλάμπους), a 51-year-old Cypriot pilot who had flown exclusively for Helios for the previous five years, accruing 7,549 flight hours throughout his career, with 3,991 of them on the Boeing 737. Louisa Vouteri (Greek: Λουΐζα Βουτέρη), a 32-year-old Greek national living in Cyprus, had replaced a sick colleague as the chief flight attendant.

== Accident ==
Timeline
Date: 14 August 2005; All times Eastern European Summer Time (EEST) (UTC + 3) in 24 h format
Time	Event
09:00	Scheduled departure
09:07	Departs Larnaca International Airport
09:12:38	Cabin altitude warning sounds at 12,040 feet (3,670 m)
09:14:11	Pilots report air conditioning problem
09:20:21	Last contact with crew, altitude is 28,900 feet (8,809 m)
09:23:32	Now at 34,000 feet (10,400 m) likely on autopilot
09:37	Enters Athens flight information region, the pilots have no air to breathe but keep climbing Aircraft begins circling Athens on autopilot
10:12–10:50	No response to radio calls from Athens ATC
10:45	Scheduled arrival in Athens
10:54	Athens Joint Rescue Coordination Centre alerted to possible renegade aircraft
11:05	Two F-16 fighters depart Nea Anchialos
11:23:51	Located by F-16s over Aegean island of Kea
11:32	Fighters see co-pilot slumped over, cabin oxygen deployed, no signs of terrorism
11:49	Fighters see an individual in the cockpit, apparently trying to regain control of aircraft
11:49:50	Left (#1) engine stops operating, presumably due to fuel depletion
11:54	Cockpit voice recorder records a total of five mayday messages
11:59:47	Right (#2) engine stops operating
12:03:32	Aircraft crashes in mountains near Grammatiko, Greece

When the aircraft arrived at Larnaca from London earlier that morning, the previous flight crew had reported a frozen door seal and abnormal noises coming from the right aft service door. They requested a full inspection of the door. The inspection was carried out by a ground engineer, who then performed a pressurization leak check. To carry out this check without requiring the aircraft's engines, the pressurization system was set to "manual", but the engineer failed to reset it to "auto" upon completion of the test.

After the aircraft was returned into service, the new flight crew overlooked the pressurization system state on three occasions: during the preflight procedure, the after-start check, and the after-takeoff check. During these checks, no one on the flight deck noticed the incorrect setting. The aircraft took off at 09:07 with the pressurization system still set to "manual", and the aft outflow valve partially open.

As the aircraft climbed, the pressure inside the cabin gradually decreased. As it passed through an altitude of 12,040 feet (3,670 m), the cabin altitude warning horn sounded. The warning should have prompted the crew to stop climbing, but it was misidentified by the crew as a takeoff configuration warning, which signals that the aircraft is not ready for takeoff and can sound only on the ground. The alert sound is identical for both warnings.

In the next few minutes, several warning lights on the overhead panel in the cockpit illuminated. One or both of the equipment cooling warning lights came on to indicate low airflow through the cooling fans, which is a result of the decreased air density, accompanied by the master caution light. The passenger oxygen light illuminated when, at an altitude around 18,000 feet (5,500 m), the oxygen masks in the passenger cabin automatically deployed.

Shortly after the cabin altitude warning sounded, Captain Merten radioed the Helios operations centre and reported "the takeoff configuration warning on" and "cooling equipment normal and alternate off line." He then spoke to the ground engineer and repeatedly stated that the "cooling ventilation fan lights were off." The engineer who had conducted the pressurization leak check asked: "Can you confirm that the pressurization panel is set to AUTO?" However, Merten was already experiencing the onset of the initial symptoms of hypoxia, and disregarded the question. Instead, he asked, "Where are my equipment cooling circuit breakers?" This was the last communication with the aircraft before the captain and first officer fell unconscious.

The aircraft continued to climb until it leveled off at about 34,000 feet (10,000 m). Between 09:30 and 09:40, Nicosia air traffic control (ATC) repeatedly attempted to contact the aircraft, without success. At 09:37, the aircraft passed from Cyprus flight information region (FIR) into Athens FIR, without making contact with Athens ATC. The 19 attempts to contact the aircraft between 10:12 and 10:50 also met with no response, and at 10:40, the aircraft entered the holding pattern for Athens Airport, at the KEA VOR, still at FL340. It remained in the holding pattern, under control of the autopilot, for the next 70 minutes.

As the aircraft flew in a continuous loop over Athens, the Greek military decided to intervene. Sources differ on if they were contacted by Athens ATC or if they chose to intervene themselves, believing this may have been a possible terrorism incident. At 11:05, two F-16 fighter aircraft from the Hellenic Air Force (HAF) 111th Combat Wing were scrambled from Nea Anchialos Air Base to establish visual contact. They intercepted the passenger jet at 11:24 while it was undergoing the sixth loop of the holding pattern and observed that the first officer was slumped motionless at the controls, and the captain's seat was empty. It is commonly accepted that Captain Merten had left his seat to try to pull a circuit breaker when he passed out. They also reported that oxygen masks were dangling in the passenger cabin.

At 11:49, flight attendant Andreas Prodromou entered the cockpit and sat down in the captain's seat, having remained conscious by using a portable oxygen supply. Early media reports erroneously claimed his girlfriend and fellow flight attendant, Haris Charalambous, was also seen in the cockpit helping Prodromou try to control the aircraft. According to a July 2006 television documentary, blood samples that were found in the radar controls were matched to Prodromou's DNA and also those of Haris, which led the documentary's investigators to the conclusion that the two flight attendants were trying to save the plane. However, the official investigation report published in October 2006 said the F-16 crew only saw one male in the cockpit and did not mention DNA evidence. Prodromou held a UK Commercial Pilot Licence, but was not qualified to fly the Boeing 737.

Prodromou waved at the F-16s very briefly, but almost as soon as he entered the cockpit, the left engine flamed out due to fuel exhaustion, and the plane left the holding pattern and started to descend. Crash investigators concluded that Prodromou's experience was insufficient for him to gain control of the aircraft under the circumstances. Some evidence indicates he tried to wake up the pilots and his girlfriend, who were all in a deep coma by that time. Ten minutes after the loss of power from the left engine, the right engine also flamed out and, just before 12:04, the aircraft crashed into hills in the vicinity of the village of Grammatiko, 40 km (25 mi; 22 nmi) from Athens in East Attica, killing everyone on board.

== Passengers ==
Nationality	Passengers	Crew	Total
Cyprus	103	4	107
Germany	0	1	1
Greece	12	1	13
Total	115	6	121

Flight 522 was carrying 115 passengers and a crew of six. 67 of the passengers were to disembark at Athens, with the remaining 48 continuing to Prague. The bodies of 118 people were recovered. The passenger list included 93 adults and 22 children. The passengers comprised 103 Cypriot nationals and 12 Greek nationals, with five of the flight crew also from those countries. Captain Merten was the only person on board not from either country.

== Investigation ==
=== Overview ===
The aircraft's flight data recorder and cockpit voice recorder (CVR) were sent to the Bureau of Enquiry and Analysis for Civil Aviation Safety near Paris. The CVR recording enabled investigators to identify Prodromou as the flight attendant who entered the cockpit to try to save the plane. While Prodromou was a trained pilot, he was never trained on a Boeing 737. Prodromou's mayday hails were only weakly heard, as the 737's radio was still tuned to Larnaca ATC and he was unable to find the correct frequency for Athens ATC. As a result, none of his hails were received. Prodromou's voice was recognized by colleagues who listened to the CVR recording.

Many of the bodies recovered were burned beyond recognition by the post-impact fire. Autopsies on the crash victims showed that all were alive at the time of impact, but whether they were conscious could not be determined.

The emergency oxygen supply in the passenger cabin of this model of Boeing 737 is provided by chemical generators that provide enough oxygen to sustain consciousness for about 12 minutes, through breathing masks. This is normally sufficient for an emergency descent to 10,000 feet (3,000 m), where atmospheric pressure is sufficient for humans to sustain consciousness without supplemental oxygen. Cabin crew have access to portable oxygen sets with considerably longer duration.

Greece's Air Accident Investigation and Aviation Safety Board (AAIASB) listed the direct causal chain of events that led to the accident as:

- non-recognition by the pilots that the pressurization system was set to "manual"
- non-identification by the crew of the true nature of the problem
- incapacitation of the crew except Prodromou due to hypoxia
- eventual fuel starvation
- impact with the ground

=== Previous pressurization problems ===
During an earlier flight from Warsaw in December 2004, the aircraft had experienced a rapid loss of cabin pressure, and the flight crew made an emergency descent. The flight attendants reported to the captain hearing a bang from the aft service door, and that a hand-sized hole was in the door's seal. The Cypriot Air Accident and Incident Investigation Board (AAIIB) could not conclusively determine the causes of the incident, but indicated two possibilities: an electrical malfunction causing the opening of the outflow valve, or the inadvertent opening of the aft service door.

The mother of First Officer Charalambous claimed that her son had repeatedly complained to Captain Merten about the aircraft getting cold. Passengers also reported problems with air conditioning on Helios flights. The aircraft's environmental control system had been repaired or inspected seven times during the ten weeks before the accident.

== Subsequent developments ==
Helios Airways announced successful safety checks on their Boeing fleet in August 2005, and put them back into service. However, Cypriot authorities detained the company's aircraft and froze the company's bank accounts about a year later, and the airline announced that it would stop operating on 31 October 2006.

In the aftermath of the accident, a number of fake photographs purported to depict the aircraft involved in Helios Flight 522 circulated, and were claimed to be the final photographs of the aircraft before it crashed, taken during its intercept by the HAF. These images, depicting a Boeing 737 with Helios Airways livery accompanied by F-16s, were found to be fabricated; the aircraft depicted in the image was 5B-DBH, nicknamed Zela, a Boeing 737-800 that was in service with Helios Airways at the time of the accident identified by its overwing exits, longer fuselage, and trailing edge wingtips.

The United States Federal Aviation Administration released an Airworthiness Directive in March 2011 requiring all Boeing 737 aircraft from −100 to −500 models to be fitted with two additional cockpit warning lights. These would indicate problems with takeoff configuration or pressurization. Aircraft on the U.S. civil register were required to have the additional lights by 14 March 2014.

=== Lawsuits and criminal proceedings ===
Families of the victims filed a lawsuit against Boeing in July 2007. Their lawyer noted the alarm being used for two different issues, and that similar problems had been encountered before on Boeings in Ireland and Norway. The families sued for 76 million euros in compensation from Boeing. The case against Boeing was settled out of court.

Six former Helios Airways employees were charged with manslaughter over the incident in early 2008: three Cypriots, two Britons, and one Bulgarian. Helios Airways and four of its officials were charged in Cyprus with 119 counts of manslaughter, and causing death by recklessness and negligence in December 2008. The trial ran from November 2009 to June 2011.

The case was dismissed in December 2011 and the defendants were acquitted. The panel of judges hearing the case ruled that no "causal association between the defendants, and the negligence they were charged with for the fatal accident" was shown. An appeal was filed by the Cypriot attorney general. The Supreme Court of Cyprus set aside the acquittal in December 2012, and ordered a new trial. Two months later, the retrial was dropped under European Union double jeopardy rules, as the charges had already been heard in Greece.

A new trial began in a Greek magistrate's court in December 2011 in which four Helios officials were charged with manslaughter. All four were found guilty in April 2012, and sentenced to ten years imprisonment. One succeeded in his appeal in 2013, while the other defendants lost theirs. The ten year sentences were ordered to stand, but the defendants were given the option to buy out their sentence for around €79,000 each. The Bulgarian employee was spared time in jail after the intervention of the government of Bulgaria.

Greek investigators blamed the crash of Flight 522 on human error because the aircraft failed to pressurize after taking off from Larnaca. Prosecutors in both Greece and Cyprus blamed airline officials for cutting corners on safety operations, while also arguing that they failed to act on advice that the pilots did not meet the necessary aviation standards.

Relatives of the dead filed a class action suit against the government of Cyprus—specifically the Department of Civil Aviation (DCA)—for negligence that led to the air disaster. They claimed that the DCA had ignored airlines' loose enforcement of regulations, and that in general the department cut corners in flight safety.

== In popular culture ==
The Discovery Channel Canada/National Geographic Channel TV series Mayday featured the accident in a season-four episode titled "Ghost Plane".

The CBS series Ghost Whisperer featured a two-part special called "Free Fall" and "The One", where a passenger plane is flying around in the air due to everyone on board having died from a lack of oxygen. These episodes were broadcast on 27 April and 5 May in 2006, eight months after the accident.

== See also ==
- List of decompression accidents and incidents
  - 1999 South Dakota Learjet 35 crash
  - 2000 Australia Beechcraft King Air crash
  - 2022 Baltic Sea Cessna Citation II crash
  - 2023 Virginia Cessna Citation crash
- List of accidents and incidents involving the Boeing 737
