= 1999 South Dakota Learjet 35 crash =

1999 aviation accident in South Dakota

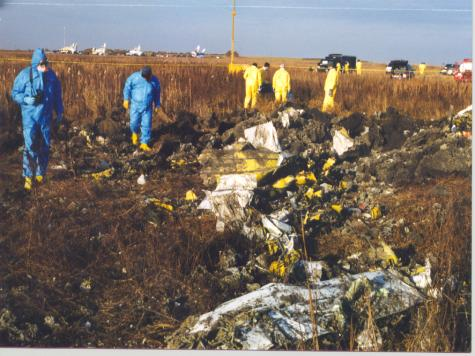
- NTSB investigators examining the crash site

Accident
- Date: October 25, 1999
- Summary: Crew incapacitation due to loss of cabin pressure; cause undetermined
- Site: Mina, South Dakota, United States; 45°25′00″N 98°45′00″W

Aircraft
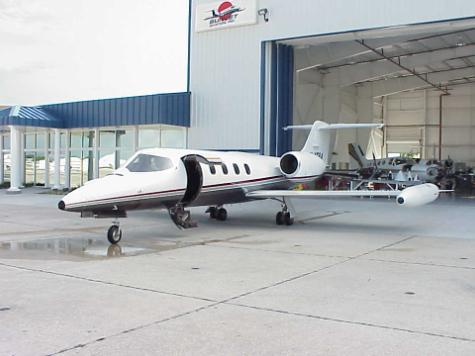
- N47BA, the aircraft involved in the accident
- Aircraft type: Learjet 35
- Operator: Sunjet Aviation
- Registration: N47BA
- Flight origin: Orlando International Airport, Orlando, Florida, United States
- Destination: Dallas Love Field, Dallas, Texas, United States
- Occupants: 6
- Passengers: 4
- Crew: 2
- Fatalities: 6
- Survivors: 0

On October 25, 1999, a chartered Learjet 35 business jet was scheduled to fly from Orlando, Florida, United States to Dallas, Texas, United States. Early in the flight, the aircraft, which was climbing to its assigned altitude on autopilot, lost cabin pressure, and all six on board were incapacitated and killed by hypoxia, a lack of oxygen in the brain and body. The aircraft continued climbing past its assigned altitude, then failed to make the westward turn toward Dallas over North Florida and continued on its northwestern course, flying over the Southern and Midwestern United States for almost four hours and 1,500 miles (1,300 nmi; 2,400 km). The plane ran out of fuel over South Dakota and crashed into a field near Aberdeen after an uncontrolled descent.

The two pilots were Michael Kling and Stephanie Bellegarrigue. The four passengers on board were PGA Tour golfer Payne Stewart; his agent Robert Fraley (a former Alabama Crimson Tide football team member); Van Ardan (president of the Leader Enterprises sports management agency); and Bruce Borland, a golf architect with the Jack Nicklaus golf course design company.

== Accident ==
Note: all times are presented in 24-hour format. Because the flight took place in both the Eastern Time Zone – Eastern Daylight Time (EDT) – and the Central Time Zone – Central Daylight Time (CDT) – all times are given in this article in Coordinated Universal Time (which is indicated by the time followed by the letters UTC).

=== Departure ===
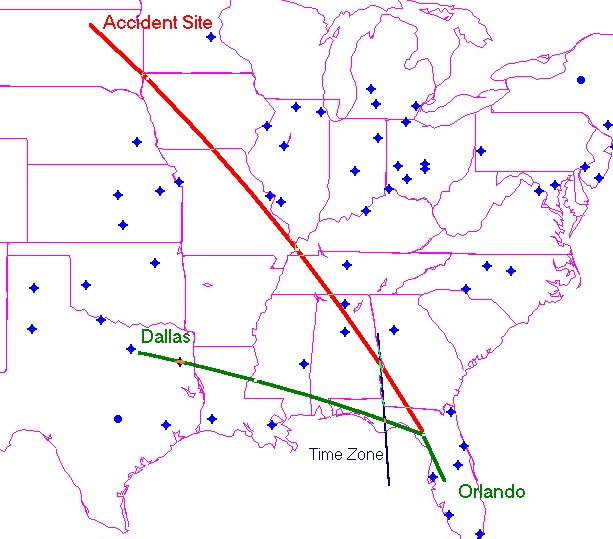
The projected (in green) and actual (in red) ground track of N47BA from departure in Orlando to Dallas and to crash site in South Dakota.

On October 25, 1999, a Learjet 35, registration N47BA, operated by Sunjet Aviation of Sanford, Florida, departed Orlando International Airport (IATA: MCO, ICAO: KMCO, FAA LID: MCO) at 13:19 UTC (09:19 EDT) on a two-day, five-flight trip. Before departure, the aircraft had been fueled with 5,300 pounds (2,400 kg) of Jet A, enough for four hours and 45 minutes of flight. On board were two pilots and four passengers.

At 13:27:13 UTC, the air traffic controller from the Jacksonville Air Route Traffic Control Center (ARTCC) instructed the pilot to climb and maintain flight level (FL) 390 (39,000 feet (12,000 m) above sea level). At 13:27:18 UTC (09:27:18 EDT), the pilot acknowledged the clearance by stating, "three nine zero bravo alpha." This was the last known radio transmission from the airplane, and occurred while the aircraft was passing through 23,000 feet (7,000 m). The next attempt to contact the aircraft occurred six minutes and twenty seconds later, fourteen minutes after departure, with the aircraft at 36,500 feet (11,100 m). The controller's message went unacknowledged. The controller attempted to contact N47BA five more times in the next 4 1/2 minutes, again with no answer.

=== First interception ===
About 14:54 UTC (now 09:54 CDT in the Central Time Zone), Colonel Kent Olson, a United States Air Force (USAF) F-16 test pilot from the 40th Flight Test Squadron at Eglin Air Force Base in western Florida, who happened to be in the air nearby, was directed by controllers to intercept N47BA. When the fighter was about 2,000 feet (610 m) from the Learjet, at an altitude of about 46,400 feet (14,100 m), Olson made two radio calls to N47BA, but did not receive a response. The F-16 pilot made a visual inspection of the Lear, finding no visible damage to the airplane. Both engines were running and the plane's red, rotating anti-collision beacon was on, which is standard operation for aircraft in flight.

Olson could not see inside the passenger section of the airplane, because the windows seemed to be dark. He stated that the entire right cockpit windshield was opaque, as if condensation or ice covered the inside. He indicated that the left cockpit windshield was opaque, although several sections of the center of the windshield seemed to be only thinly covered by condensation or ice. A small rectangular section of the windshield was clear, with only a small section of the glare shield visible through this area. He did not see any flight control movement. At about 15:12 UTC, Olson concluded his inspection of N47BA and broke formation, proceeding to Scott Air Force Base in southwestern Illinois.

=== Second interception ===
At 16:13 UTC, almost three hours into the flight of the unresponsive Learjet, two F-16s from the 138th Fighter Wing of the Oklahoma Air National Guard, flying under the call-sign "TULSA 13 flight," were directed by the Minneapolis ARTCC to intercept the Learjet. The TULSA 13 lead pilot reported that he could not see any movement in the cockpit, that the windshield was dark and that he could not tell if the windshield was iced. A few minutes later, a TULSA 13 pilot reported, "We're not seeing anything inside, could be just a dark cockpit though... he is not reacting, moving or anything like that he should be able to have seen us by now." At 16:39 UTC, TULSA 13 left to rendezvous with a tanker for refueling.

=== Third interception and escort ===
About 16:50 UTC, two F-16s from the 119th Wing of the North Dakota Air National Guard with the identification "NODAK 32" were directed to intercept N47BA. TULSA 13 flight also returned from refueling and all four fighters maneuvered close to the Learjet. The TULSA 13 lead pilot reported, "We've got two visuals on it. It's looking like the cockpit window is iced over and there's no displacement in any of the control surfaces as far as the ailerons or trims." About 17:01 UTC, TULSA 13 flight returned to the tanker again, while NODAK 32 remained with N47BA.

Officials at The Pentagon denied that a shoot down of the Learjet was considered to prevent a possible crash in a heavily populated area, indicating that the fighter jets were not armed with air-to-air missiles.

Canadian Prime Minister Jean Chrétien authorized the Canadian Forces Air Command to shoot down the plane if it entered Canadian airspace without making contact. He writes in his 2018 memoirs, "The plane was heading toward the city of Winnipeg and the air traffic controllers feared that it would crash into the Manitoba capital. I was asked to give permission for the military to bring down the plane if that became necessary. With a heavy heart, I authorized the procedure. Shortly after I made my decision, I learned that the plane had crashed in South Dakota."

=== Crash ===
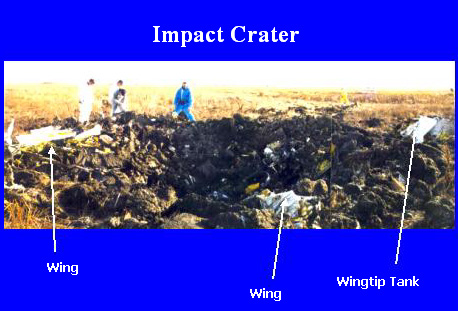
The crash's crater, from a NTSB presentation

The Learjet's cockpit voice recorder (CVR), which was recovered from the wreckage, contained an audio recording of the last thirty minutes of the flight. It was an older model, which recorded only thirty minutes of audio. The aircraft was not equipped with a flight data recorder. At 17:10:41 UTC, the Learjet's engines can be heard winding down on the CVR recording, indicating that the plane's fuel had been exhausted. In addition, sounds of the stick shaker and the disconnection of the autopilot can be heard. With the engines powered down, the autopilot would have attempted to maintain altitude, causing the plane's airspeed to drop until it approached stall speed, at which point the stick shaker would have automatically engaged to warn the pilot and the autopilot would have switched itself off.

At 17:11:01 UTC, the Lear began a right turn and descent. NODAK 32 remained to the west, while TULSA 13 broke away from the tanker and followed N47BA down. At 17:11:26 UTC, the NODAK 32 lead pilot reported, "The target is descending and he is doing multiple rolls, looks like he's out of control... in a severe descent, request an emergency descent to follow target." The TULSA 13 pilot reported, "It's soon to impact the ground; he is in a descending spiral."

Impact occurred approximately 17:13 UTC, or 12:13 local, after a total flight time of 3 hours, 54 minutes, with the aircraft hitting the ground at nearly supersonic speed and at an extreme angle. The Learjet crashed in South Dakota, just outside Mina in Edmunds County, on relatively flat ground and left a 42-foot-long (13 m) crater, 21 feet (6.4 m) wide, and 8 feet (2.4 m) deep. The aircraft was completely destroyed.

== Passengers and crew ==
In addition to Payne Stewart and three others, there were two pilots on board:

The 42-year-old captain, Michael Kling, held an airline transport pilot certificate and type ratings for the Boeing 707, Boeing 737, and Learjet 35. He had Air Force experience flying the KC-135 and Boeing E-3 Sentry. Kling was also an instructor pilot on the KC-135E in the Maine Air National Guard. According to Sunjet Aviation records, the captain had accumulated a total of 4,280 hours of flight time, military and commercial. He had flown a total of 60 hours with Sunjet, 38 as a Learjet pilot-in-command, and 22 as a Learjet second-in-command.

The first officer, 27-year-old Stephanie Bellegarrigue, held a commercial pilot certificate and type ratings for Learjet and Cessna Citation 500. She was a certified flight instructor. She had accumulated a total of 1,751 hours of flight time, of which 251 hours were with Sunjet Aviation as a second-in-command, and 99 as a Learjet second-in-command.

== Investigation ==
The National Transportation Safety Board (NTSB) has several levels of investigation, of which the highest is a "major" investigation. Because of the extraordinary circumstances in this crash, a major investigation was performed.

The NTSB determined that:

The probable cause of this accident was incapacitation of the flight crew members as a result of their failure to receive supplemental oxygen following a loss of cabin pressurization, for undetermined reasons.

The Board added a commentary regarding the possible reasons why the crew did not obtain supplemental oxygen:

Following the depressurization, the pilots did not receive supplemental oxygen in sufficient time and/or adequate concentration to avoid hypoxia and incapacitation. The wreckage indicated that the oxygen bottle pressure regulator/shutoff valve was open on the accident flight. Further, although one flight crew mask hose connector was found in the wreckage disconnected from its valve receptacle (the other connector was not recovered), damage to the recovered connector and both receptacles was consistent with both flight crew masks having been connected to the airplane's oxygen supply lines at the time of impact. In addition, both flight crew mask microphones were found plugged into their respective crew microphone jacks. Therefore, assuming the oxygen bottle contained an adequate supply of oxygen, supplemental oxygen should have been available to both pilots' oxygen masks.

[A] possible explanation for the failure of the pilots to receive emergency oxygen is that their ability to think and act decisively was impaired because of hypoxia before they could don their oxygen masks. No definitive evidence exists that indicates the rate at which the accident flight lost its cabin pressure; therefore, the Safety Board evaluated conditions of both rapid and gradual depressurization.

If there had been a breach in the fuselage (even a small one that could not be visually detected by the in-flight observers) or a seal failure, the cabin could have depressurized gradually, rapidly, or even explosively. Research has shown that a period of as little as 8 seconds without supplemental oxygen following rapid depressurization to about 30,000 feet (9,100 m) may cause a drop in oxygen saturation that can significantly impair cognitive functioning and increase the amount of time required to complete complex tasks.

A more gradual decompression could have resulted from other possible causes, such as a smaller leak in the pressure vessel or a closed flow control valve. Safety Board testing determined that a closed flow control valve would cause complete depressurization to the airplane's flight altitude over a period of several minutes. However, without supplemental oxygen, substantial adverse effects on cognitive and motor skills would have been expected soon after the first clear indication of decompression (the cabin altitude warning), when the cabin altitude reached 10,000 feet (3,000 m) (which could have occurred in about 30 seconds).

Investigations of other accidents in which flight crews attempted to diagnose a pressurization problem or initiate emergency pressurization instead of immediately donning oxygen masks following a cabin altitude alert have revealed that, even with a relatively gradual rate of depressurization, pilots have rapidly lost cognitive or motor abilities to effectively troubleshoot the problem or don their masks shortly thereafter. In this accident, the flight crew's failure to obtain supplemental oxygen in time to avoid incapacitation could be explained by a delay in donning oxygen masks; of only a few seconds in the case of an explosive or rapid decompression, or a slightly longer delay in the case of a gradual decompression.

In summary, the Safety Board was unable to determine why the flight crew could not, or did not, receive supplemental oxygen in sufficient time and/or adequate concentration to avoid hypoxia and incapacitation.

The NTSB report showed that the plane had several instances of maintenance work related to cabin pressure in the months leading up to the crash. The NTSB was unable to determine whether they stemmed from a common problem – replacements and repairs were documented, but not the pilot discrepancy reports that prompted them or the frequency of such reports. The report criticized Sunjet Aviation for the possibility that this would have made the problem harder to identify, track, and resolve, as well as the fact that in at least one instance the plane was flown with an unauthorized maintenance deferral for cabin pressure problems.

In 2001, the FAA alleged James Watkins Sr. of Sunjet Aviation "filed false records" about the amount of training time given to eight pilots, including Kling and Bellegarrigue. The FAA requested Watkins be "permanently grounded", while Watkins' lawyer denied the allegations.

== Aftermath ==
Stewart was ultimately headed to Houston for the 1999 Tour Championship but planned a stop in Dallas for discussions with the athletic department of his alma mater, Southern Methodist University, about building a new home course for the school's golf program. Stewart was memorialized at the Tour Championship with a lone bagpipe player playing at the first hole at Champions Golf Club prior to the beginning of the first day of play.

The owner of the crash site, after consulting the wives of Stewart and several other victims, created a memorial on about 1 acre (4,000 m^{2}) of the site. At its center is a rock pulled from the site inscribed with the names of the victims and a Bible passage.

The 2000 U.S. Open, held at Pebble Beach Golf Links, began with a golf version of a 21-gun salute when 21 of Stewart's fellow players simultaneously hit balls into the Pacific Ocean.

In 2001, Stewart was posthumously inducted into the World Golf Hall of Fame.

On June 8, 2005, a Florida state court jury in Orlando found that Learjet was not liable for the deaths of the passengers.

== Documentaries ==
The documentary series Mayday features this incident in the first episode of its 16th season. The episode, titled "Deadly Silence", was first aired on June 7, 2016.

== See also ==
- Bo Rein – American football and baseball player who died in a similar aircraft accident
- 2000 Queensland Beechcraft King Air crash
- Helios Airways Flight 522
- 2022 Baltic Sea Cessna Citation II crash
- 2023 Virginia Cessna Citation crash
- 2026 Palm Beach County Learjet 60 crash
