= United Nations Security Council Resolution 339 =

1973 UN Security Council resolution calling for a ceasefire in the Yom Kippur War

UN Security Council Resolution 339
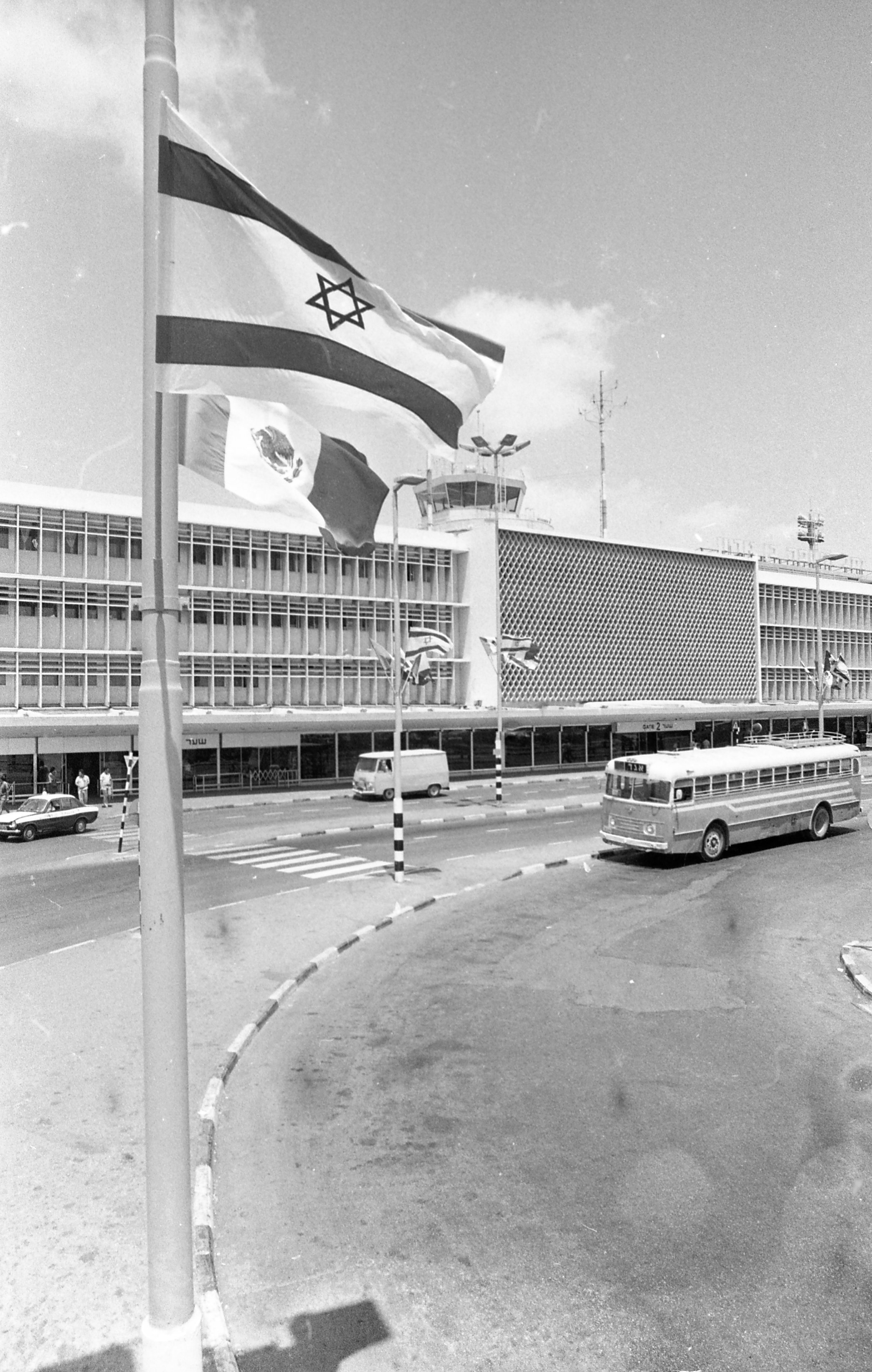
- Israel flag
- Date: 23 October 1973
- Meeting no.: 1,748
- Code: S/RES/339 (Document)
- Subject: Cease-Fire between Egypt and Israel
- Voting summary: 14 voted for; None voted against; 1 abstained
- Result: Approved

Security Council composition
- Permanent members: China; France; Soviet Union; United Kingdom; United States
- Non-permanent members: Australia; Austria; Guinea; India; Indonesia; Kenya; Panama; Peru; Sudan; Yugoslavia

United Nations Security Council Resolution 339 was adopted on 23 October 1973 in order to bring a ceasefire in the Yom Kippur War where Resolution 338 two days before had failed.

The resolution primarily reaffirmed the terms outlined in Resolution 338 (itself based on Resolution 242), returning the forces of both sides back to the position they held when the cease fire (338) came into effect, and a request from the United Nations Secretary-General to undertake measures toward the placement of observers to supervise the cease fire.

The resolution was adopted with 14 votes to none; the People's Republic of China did not participate in the voting.

== See also ==
- Arab–Israeli conflict
- List of United Nations Security Council Resolutions 301 to 400 (1971–1976)
