= MenaJet =

Lebanese charter airline

IATA	ICAO	Call sign
IM	MNJ	MENAJET
- Founded: 2003
- Commenced operations: 2004
- Ceased operations: 2009
- Hubs: Beirut Rafic Hariri International Airport
- Focus cities: Sharjah International Airport
- Fleet size: 1
- Headquarters: Beirut, Lebanon
- Website: http://www.menajet.com/

MenaJet Lebanon s.a.l. was a Lebanese charter airline based in Beirut, Lebanon. It operates services to Turkey, Egypt and around the Mediterranean. Its main bases were Beirut Rafic Hariri International Airport and Sharjah International Airport. In 2010, the airline ceased all operations.

== History ==
The airline was established in May 2003 and started operations on 13 August 2004. It is owned by Al Zamil Group (45%), Gulf Finance House (45%) and others (10%) and has 47 employees (at March 2007).

The airline ceased operations in 2008.

== Destinations ==
MenaJet's schedule was constantly changing as they were a charter carrier. In the summer, they operated to a number of destinations for vacation package companies, namely Nakhal. Throughout the rest of the year, MenaJet's traffic mostly relied on wet-leases and non-scheduled charters. MenaJet offered flights to Berlin, Amsterdam, Egypt, and Turkey.

== Fleet ==
The MenaJet fleet consisted of the following aircraft (as of March 2009):

- 1 Airbus A320-211
