= Ghost flight (commercial aviation) =

Term used in commercial aviation

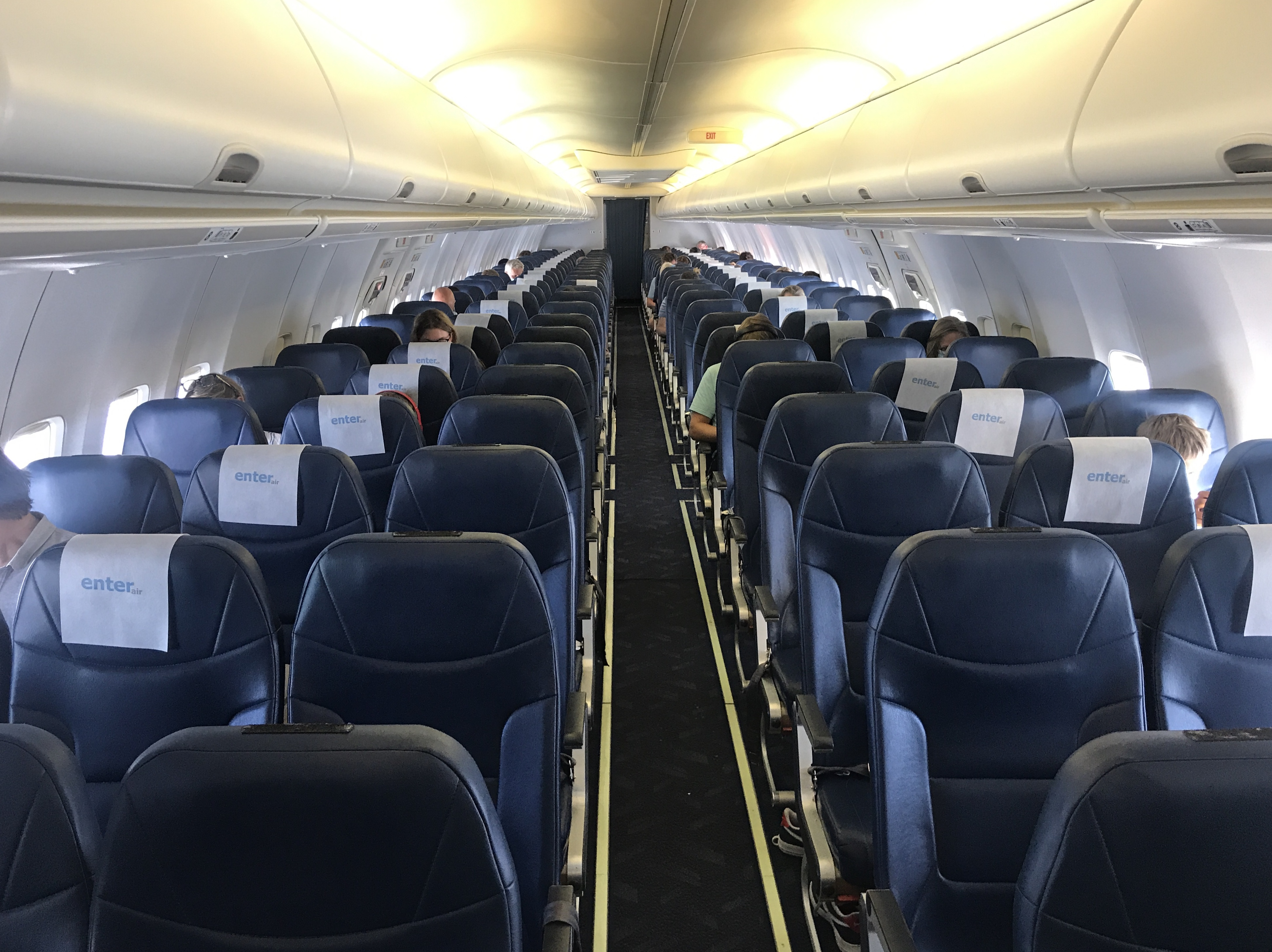
Flight containing less than 10% of capacity during COVID-19 travel.

In commercial aviation, ghost flight is a term used to describe a flight operated by an airline on a regularly scheduled route with an aircraft containing fewer than 10% of the airplane's total capacity. While initially considered to be a rare occurrence, ghost flights have become more frequent as of the early 2020s following the COVID-19 pandemic. Critics say these flights are unnecessarily adding to the environmental effects of aviation

Since the beginning of 2019, over 5,000 aircraft have flown to and from United Kingdom airports with no passengers. In addition, the Civil Aviation Authority (CAA) confirmed that over 35,000 flights had fewer than 10% of passenger capacity. The United Kingdom's biggest airport, Heathrow, accounted for 10,467 flights.

As the COVID-19 pandemic began to spread worldwide in March 2020, flights were cancelled and delayed due to travel restrictions. During this time, airline travel was reduced by 45% in 2020. Because of this, airlines had to increase the number of empty flights in order to maintain their airport slots during this time.

== Airport slot rule ==
In order to maintain an effective airport and keep flights on time, airports have implemented slot rules to ensure flights are able to continue in a timely manner and limit airspace congestion. These slot rules also help maximize competition and keep airfares low. Airlines are required to utilize the slots for flights or trade them. If a slot goes unused, the airline must give back the slot so other airlines are able to use it.

Before the COVID restrictions, airlines were required to use their allotted spots at least 80% of the time. During the pandemic, the European Commission temporarily suspended Europe's airport slot rule for a short period. Due to travel restrictions, many flights were cancelled or had limited capacity, which made it difficult for airlines to fulfill all the requirements for possessing an airport slot. The suspension of the slot rule was reinstated in October 2021. After the slot rule was reinstated, the rule only required European airlines to use 75% of their flight slots for the winter season. In the summer of 2023, they plan on getting back on track to pre-pandemic regulations and will be required to fill 80% of airport slots. However, in January 2022 the Lufthansa Group, Europe's second largest airline, estimated that it would need to operate 18,000 ghost flights this winter to be able to keep all their current runway slots. Ghost flights are an example of waste and unnecessary emissions, and are used as an argument for slot reform.

As of July 2022, the European Commission adopted a proposal that would allow more flexibility of airline slots. Airlines would be allowed to use exceptions in situations such as natural disasters, epidemiological emergencies such as pandemics, or widespread political unrest resulting in disruptive effect on air travel. The proposal went into effect on October 30, 2022.
