= Mina, South Dakota =

Mina: Cortland; Cortlandt
- Census-designated place
- Location in South Dakota Location in the United States
- Coordinates: 45°26′49″N 98°45′24″W
- Country: United States
- State: South Dakota
- County: Edmunds
- Established: 1909
- Named for: Mina Erling

Area
  - Total: 4.71 sq mi (12.21 km^{2})
  - Land: 3.78 sq mi (9.80 km^{2})
  - Water: 0.93 sq mi (2.41 km^{2})
- Elevation: 1,431 ft (436 m)

Population (2020)
  - Total: 554
  - Density: 146.5/sq mi (56.55/km^{2})
- Time zone: UTC-6 (Central (CST))
  - Summer (DST): UTC-5 (CDT)
- FIPS code: 46-42700
- GNIS feature ID: 2813018

Mina is an unincorporated community and a census-designated place (CDP) in Edmunds County, in the U.S. state of South Dakota. The population of the CDP was 554 at the 2020 census.

== History ==
A post office called Mina was established in 1909, and remained in operation until 1983. The community most likely was named after Mina Erling, the daughter of a railroad official.

=== 1999 Learjet crash ===
In 1999, a Learjet carrying PGA golfer Payne Stewart and five other people (including two pilots and three passengers) crashed in a field about a mile south of Mina. All were allegedly dead from a lack of oxygen long before the crash.

== Demographics ==
Historical population
Census	Pop.	Note	%±
2020	554		—
U.S. Decennial Census

== Education ==
It is in the Ipswich School District 22-6.
