= 2022 Baltic Sea Cessna Citation II crash =

2022 aviation accident in the Baltic Sea

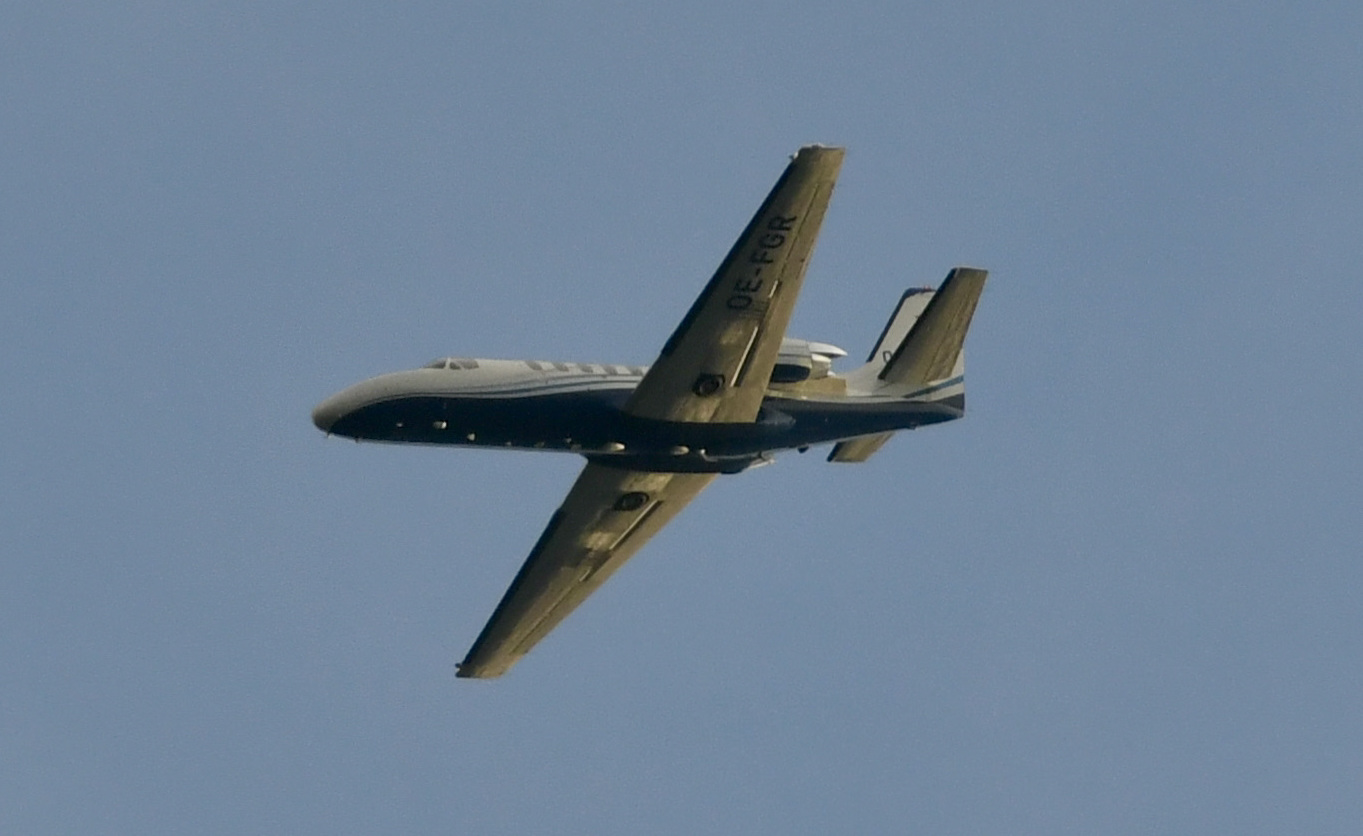
- OE-FGR, the aircraft involved in the accident, pictured in 2021

Accident
- Date: 4 September 2022; 17:31 (GMT)
- Summary: Crashed into the sea; under investigation
- Site: Baltic Sea near Ventspils, Latvia; 57°39′54″N 21°5′38.4″E

Aircraft
- Aircraft type: Cessna 551 Citation II/SP
- Operator: GG Rent GmbH
- Registration: OE-FGR
- Flight origin: Jerez Airport, Spain
- Destination: Cologne Bonn Airport, Germany
- Occupants: 4
- Passengers: 3
- Crew: 1
- Fatalities: 4
- Survivors: 0

On 4 September 2022, a chartered Cessna 551 business jet registered in Austria was scheduled to fly from Jerez, Spain, to Cologne, Germany. Early in the flight the aircraft's pilot notified air traffic control about a cabin pressure malfunction. After the aircraft passed the Iberian Peninsula, no further contact could be established.

The aircraft, which climbed to its assigned altitude at 36,000 feet (11,000 m), slightly turned near Paris and Cologne, where it failed to make a landing, and continued straight on its northeastern course, flying over Germany and then out for almost two hours and 1,120 kilometres (700 mi; 600 nmi) over the Baltic Sea near Denmark and Sweden. Fuel was eventually exhausted when the aircraft was over the Baltic Sea, approximately 37 kilometres (23 mi; 20 nmi) off Ventspils, Latvia, and crashed into the water in a spiral dive after an uncontrolled descent.

== Aircraft ==
The aircraft involved in the accident was a 43-year-old Cessna 551 Citation II built in 1979, with manufacturer serial number 551-0021, registered as OE-FGR. The aircraft was powered by two Pratt & Whitney JT15D-4 engines and did not have a flight data recorder. Since July 2020, it was owned and operated by GG Rent.

== Passengers and crew ==
Four people from Germany were on board: pilot Karl-Peter Griesemann, his wife Juliane, their daughter Lisa (also a licensed pilot), and her boyfriend Paul. The drop in pressure caused the pilot and passengers to lose consciousness. The aircraft's operator was GG Rent GmbH, based in Bergisch Gladbach, located to the east of Cologne, Germany.

== History of the flight ==
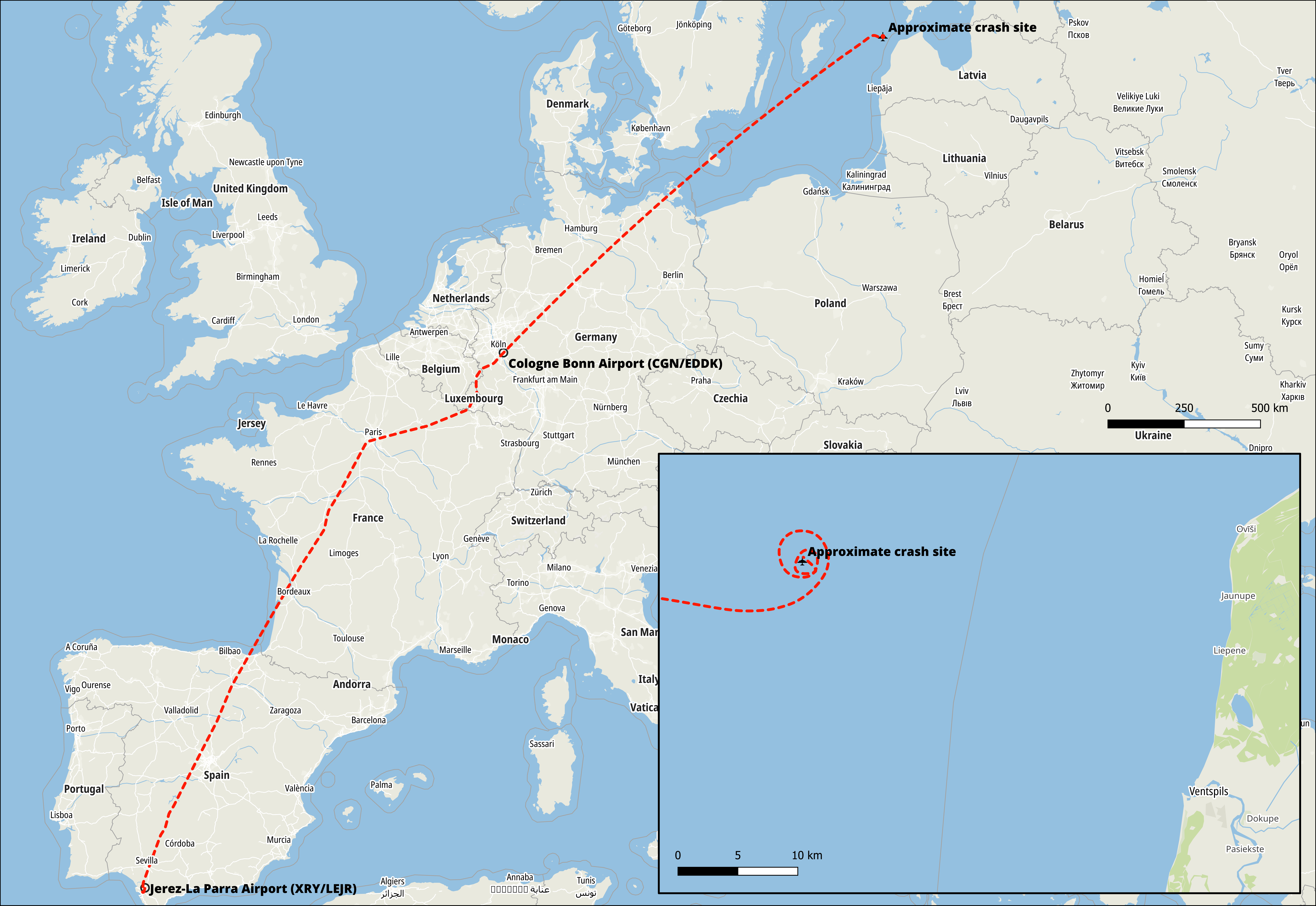
Flight path map

The aircraft, which was approved for operation with one pilot, took off from Jerez in southern Spain. The pilot reported a cabin pressure problem shortly before ATC contact was lost. The Cessna 551 Citation II was flying at 36,000 feet (11,000 m) at the time. Shortly after its entry into French airspace, around 14:25 UTC, the Cessna was intercepted by one Dassault Rafale, scrambled from Mont-de-Marsan Air Base. A second Rafale from Saint-Dizier – Robinson Air Base took over the interception. The Cessna was continuously followed by the French Air Force until it reached Cologne, around 15:57 UTC, when the German Air Force took over.

Two German Eurofighter Typhoon jets were scrambled from the Rostock-Laage air base at 16:15 GMT. Their attempts to contact the aircraft crew were unsuccessful. At 16:50 GMT, Shortly after they reached the island of Rügen, the German fighter pilots broke away. The plane entered Swedish airspace, where it flew south of Gotland and on towards the Gulf of Riga.

A Danish F-16 fighter took over the escort of the ghost flight. Later, the Danish Air Force said they could not see anybody in the cockpit after intercepting the plane. The Danish jet pilots witnessed the plane going into a downward spiral and crashing 37 kilometres (23 mi; 20 nmi) off the shoreline of Latvia, far beyond the outer edge of the Latvian territorial sea, at around 17:45 GMT.

== Aftermath ==
According to the Latvian Maritime and Air Rescue Centre, parts of the plane have been located. The Swedish Stena Line ferry Stena Urd was asked to help at the crash site.

According to Lars Antonsson at the Maritime and Air Rescue Centre, Swedish and Lithuanian helicopters flew around the crash site for several hours but did not find any survivors or bodies. Johan Ahlin from the Swedish Maritime Rescue Agency told SVT that the emergency services discovered traces of oil on the water and smaller pieces of debris.

On 5 September, the search for the plane debris and passengers began in an area of about 6 by 6 kilometres (3.7 mi × 3.7 mi; 3.2 nmi × 3.2 nmi) where the sea depth is around 60 metres (200 ft).

Later that day, a total of 11 plane wreckage parts including seats had been found, and shortly before midnight, human remains were found and transported to Ventspils by the Latvian Naval Forces.

On 8 September, further investigation of the accident was taken over by the German Federal Bureau of Aircraft Accident Investigation.

== Investigation ==
According to the provisional report, everyone on board the plane, including the pilot Griesemann, became unconscious shortly after asking a Spanish air traffic controller for permission to descend due to problems on board.

The aircraft continued to fly on autopilot until it exhausted all of its fuel and crashed into the Baltic Sea.

== See also ==
- Notable decompression accidents
