= Space diving =

Skydiving from near space

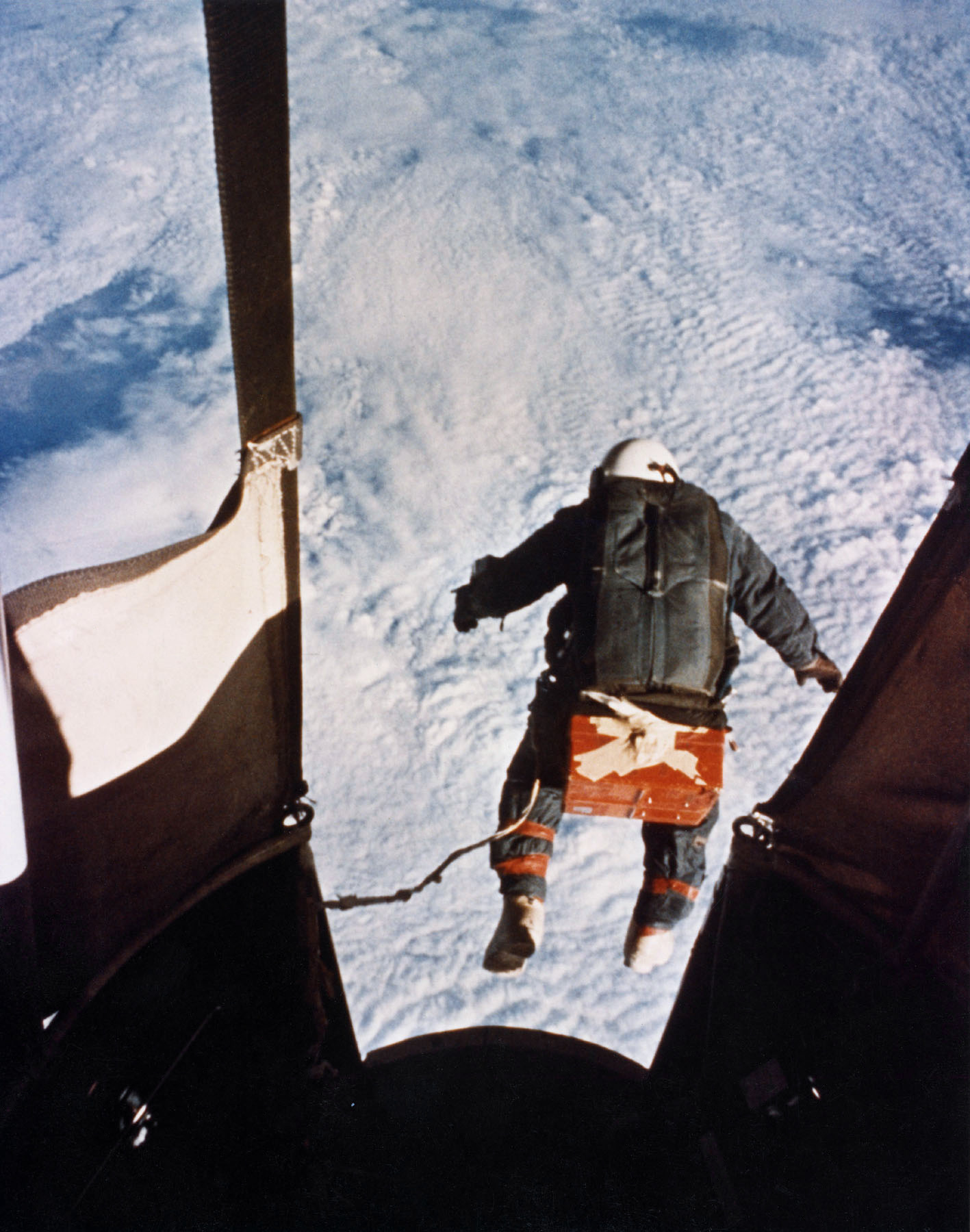
Joseph Kittinger leaps from his gondola at 31.3 km (102,800 feet).

Similar to skydiving, space diving is the act of jumping from an aircraft or spacecraft in near space and falling towards Earth. The Kármán line is a common definition as to where space begins, 100 km (62 mi) above sea level. This definition is accepted by the Fédération Aéronautique Internationale (FAI), which is an international standard setting and record-keeping body for aeronautics and astronautics. The United States Air Force uses 50 nautical miles (300,000 feet) to award astronaut wings.

No successful space dives (above 100 km) have been completed to date. Alan Eustace holds the current world record for highest and longest-distance free fall jump, which he set in 2014 when he jumped from 135,898 feet (41.422 km). Higher jumps from the mesosphere or thermosphere have yet to be successfully performed, though Orbital Outfitters, now defunct, was working to create a suit intended to enable space diving. Space diving from beyond the stratosphere was first imagined in 1934, appearing in E. E. Smith's science fiction novel Triplanetary.

== History ==
In the Second World War, flying aircraft at altitudes above 40,000 feet (12 km) had become commonplace. The US Air Force conducted research to find out how aircrew could be safely recovered during aircraft malfunctions at those altitudes from 1943. Military aircraft capable of flying in near space were developed and used soon after the war, presenting the Air Force with the challenge of dealing with bailout scenarios at very high altitudes. During Project High Dive, during which the Air Force dropped anthropomorphic measuring devices from extreme altitudes, it found out that the low air density caused the dummies to enter a violent spin that is unsurvivable for humans. This and the beginning of the Space Race prompted the Air Force to move ahead with Project Excelsior, testing the effects of space-like environments on humans. This project would result in the first stratospheric dive in history.

Colonel Joseph William Kittinger II (July 27, 1928 - December 9, 2022) in Tampa, Florida, United States a former command pilot, career military officer and retired Colonel in the United States Air Force, dived from a high-altitude balloon three times for this project from 1959. In 1960, he set a record for the highest, longest-distance, and longest-duration skydive, from a height greater than 102,000 feet (31 km).

On 1 November 1962, Yevgeni Andreyev and Pyotr Dolgov ascended from Volsk, near Saratov, undertaking a similar project for the Soviet Air Force. Under what was known as the VOLGA program, Andreyev jumped from the capsule at 83,523 feet (25.458 km) and free fell 80,380 feet (24.50 km) before successfully deploying his parachute. Dolgov remained in the capsule and ascended to 93,970 feet (28.64 km). Dolgov was primarily testing an experimental pressure suit, and would have deployed a drogue chute like Kittinger's earlier jump. As he exited the gondola, he struck his helmet which created a pin sized hole, leading to suit depressurization and his death.

In 1965–1966, Nick Piantanida accomplished a set of unsuccessful attempts to jump from 123,500 feet (37.6 km) and 120,000 feet (37 km). During the last attempt Piantanida's face mask had depressurized. His ground controllers immediately jettisoned the balloon at close to 56,000 feet (17,000 m). Piantanida barely survived the fall, and the lack of oxygen left him brain damaged and in a coma from which he never recovered.

In the early 1990s, Kittinger played a lead role with NASA assisting British SAS Soldier Charles "Nish" Bruce to break his highest parachute jump record. The project was suspended in 1994 following Bruce's mental health breakdown.

In 1997 parachutist and pilot Cheryl Stearns formed Stratoquest, aiming to break Kittinger's record as the first female space diver. Due either to a significant shoulder injury or funding issues for the project this plan did not come to fruition. By the time Stearns was prepared to attempt her jump, Felix Baumgartner had completed his jump and Stearns shelved her event.

In 2012, Felix Baumgartner broke Kittinger's highest altitude and Andreyev's longest-distance free fall records, when, on October 14, he jumped from over 128,000 ft (39 km).

In 2014, Alan Eustace set the current world record highest and longest-distance free fall jump when he jumped from 135,908 feet (41.425 km) and remained in free fall for 123,334 feet (37.592 km). However, Kittinger still holds the record for longest-duration free fall, at 4 minutes and 36 seconds, which he accomplished during his 1960 jump from 102,800 feet (31.3 km).

== Challenges to safe space diving ==
Comparison of approximate altitudes of successful stratospheric jumps and various objects with a graph of International Standard Atmosphere temperature and pressure

There are several technical requirements and challenges to the possibility of space jumping. These requirements would be somewhat eased when entering the atmosphere from a simple drop, where the heat of reentry would be considerably less than that of reentering from orbit. At any given density of air, the terminal velocity of a person is much lower than that of a heavy spacecraft. This is because starting from a stationary platform means that fall speed never exceeds the local terminal velocity (though this is quite high in thin atmosphere) and a small light body slows down relatively quickly as the atmosphere thickens.

Parachutes would require increased strength to slow the higher weights associated with the added equipment.

NASA is known to have investigated the concept in case of an emergency situation on Space Shuttle orbiters where alternative methods of reentry are not available. However, such planning has not moved beyond the conceptual stage given the high energies involved in reentry from orbital speeds. NASA has trained astronauts for lower altitude skydives from the Orbiter known as the Mode VIII egress or bailout.

== Records ==
=== Jumpers and prospective jumpers ===
- Yevgeni Nikolayevich Andreyev
- Cheryl Stearns, planned for the Stratoquest Project in 2003 but never achieved funding.
- Steve Truglia, planned a space jump in the early 2000's but died before.
- Michel Fournier, Le Grand Saut attempt in 2008 but without success.
- Nick Piantanida, died after Strato Jump III attempt in 1966.
- Olav Zipser, planned the Free Fly Astronaut Project in 2009 jumping from a rocket.
- Charles "Nish" Bruce trained for a jump but was not successful before dying.
- Eliana Rodriguez (HERA Rising prospective)
- Diana Valerín Jiménez (HERA Rising prospective)
- Swati Varshney (HERA Rising prospective)

Highest space dive records
Altitude	Set by	Date
23.287 kilometres (76,400 ft)	(United States) Joseph Kittinger	16 November 1959
25.458 kilometres (83,520 ft)	(Soviet Union) Yevgeni Andreev	1 November 1962
31.333 kilometres (102,800 ft)	(United States) Joseph Kittinger	16 August 1960
38.969 kilometres (127,850 ft)	(Austria) Felix Baumgartner	14 October 2012
41.419 kilometres (135,890 ft)	(United States) Alan Eustace	24 October 2014

== Fictional accounts ==
- In Dark Star, 1974 film, Doolittle decides to 'surf' on debris to the planet or die in the attempt.
- Star Trek: Generations, in a deleted scene from 1994 film which depicts a fictional space jump
- Star Trek: Voyager, in 1998 the season 5 episode 3 titled Extreme Risk which depicts a fictional space jump
- Star Trek, a 2009 film which depicts a fictional space jump
- Lockout, a 2012 film which depicts a fictional space jump
- Ad Astra, a 2019 film which depicts a fictional space jump

== See also ==
- Low Earth orbit, begins at around 160 km
- Project Excelsior, c. 1960, including Kittinger
- MOOSE, a study of an orbital bail-out system using a parachute
- Red Bull Stratos
