= Steve Truglia =

British stunt performer

- Born: 3 October 1962; London, England
- Died: 17 November 2016 (aged 54); Wulong, Chongqing, China
- Occupations: Stunt coordinator, stunt performer, television presenter, magician

Steve Truglia (3 October 1962 – 17 November 2016) was a stunt coordinator, stunt performer and action unit director in the UK. He became a TED speaker in 2009.

== Career ==
Truglia served as a reservist in the UK Special Forces for twenty years.

Truglia became a professional stuntman in 1996. His motion picture stunt credits included Saving Private Ryan and two James Bond films.

Truglia set multiple records, including:

- The longest Full Body Burn in the UK, ablaze for 2 minutes 5 seconds (unofficial record).
- British record (2002) for no limits freediving (breath hold diving) – 76 metres (249 ft).
- Awarded Guinness World Record in 2004 for fastest abseil over 100 metres (330 ft) (8.9 seconds).

Truglia made a fundraising attempt for a world-record high altitude parachute jump from the edge of space, to surpass what was then Joe Kittinger's 1960 record. Truglia's plan was to jump from 120,000 feet (37,000 m) in a spacesuit. He did not attempt the stunt prior to his death when he fell from a helicopter during an abseil in China.

== See also ==
- Parachuting
- Yevgeni Andreyev
- Felix Baumgartner
- Charles "Nish" Bruce
- Alan Eustace
- Michel Fournier
- Joseph Kittinger
- Nick Piantanida
- Cheryl Stearns
