= Michel Fournier (adventurer) =

French adventurer (born 1944)

- Born: 9 May 1944 (age 82); Treban, Allier, France
- Military career
- Allegiance: France
- Branch: Air Force
- Rank: Colonel

Michel Fournier (French pronunciation: [miʃɛl fuʁnje]; born 9 May 1944) is a French adventurer and retired Air Force colonel. He has been involved in planning attempts to break freefall jumping height records, but has yet to be successful in carrying out an attempt. He was born in Treban, Allier, in the Auvergne region of France.

== Parachuting experience ==
According to the French version of his own biography, he (Michel Fournier) claims to have a total of more than 8,700 jumps in 2011, including a French record of height in freefall at 12,000 m. However, his parachuting experience was disputed by Patrick de Gayardon and the magazine Paramag. No official institution has ever confirmed one of his titles.

== Le Grand Saut ==
Fournier has attempted to make record breaking freefall jumps on three occasions. In 1998, the French space agency chose Fournier to conduct a record jump to test the ability of astronauts to survive reentry without a space craft. This project was quickly canceled. In 2003, Fournier attempted his first privately financed jump but the balloon ripped while being filled. The New York Times reports that Fournier has spent "nearly $20 million" on his two private attempts.

Fournier was scheduled to carry out the Grand Saut (Big Jump) project in May 2008, which would have seen him ascend to 40 kilometres (25 mi) in a balloon and freefall 34 kilometres (21 mi) to earth before opening his parachute at 6 kilometres (3.7 mi) to go. In the process he was expected to attain a speed in freefall faster than the speed of sound, and reach speeds upward of 1,000 miles per hour (1,600 km/h). His freefall was expected to last 15 minutes. If successful, this would have broken records previously held by Joseph Kittinger, who set the previous parachute record by jumping from 31,333 metres (102,799 ft) in 1960 (with a small parachute for stability) under Project Excelsior; and Yevgeny Andreyev from the Soviet Union, who jumped from 24,483 metres (80,325 ft) in 1962, setting the longest free fall record.

The jump was expected to take place over the plains of Saskatchewan, Canada. After several delays due to weather, the attempt was made on 27 May 2008, but the balloon detached from its capsule as it was being inflated and floated away. Another attempt was made on 16 May 2010 which was unsuccessful due to the skydiver's reserve parachute deploying inside the capsule during a pre-launch test while the balloon was being filled.

The next attempt was announced for May 2011, delayed until August and then apparently postponed to 2012.

== See also ==
- Parachuting
- Yevgeni Andreyev
- Felix Baumgartner
- Alan Eustace
- Joseph Kittinger
- Nick Piantanida
- Cheryl Stearns
- Steve Truglia
