= Air sports at the 2001 World Games – Open accuracy landing =

Parachuting open accuracy landing at the World Games
- Venue: Ogata Athletic Field, Ōgata, Akita, Japan
- Date: 17–19 August 2001
- Competitors: 14 from 7 nations

Medalists
1st place, gold medalist(s)		Marco Pflüger	Germany
2nd place, silver medalist(s)		Wang Jianming	China
3rd place, bronze medalist(s)		Wei Ning	China

The open accuracy landing event at the 2001 World Games in Akita was played from 17 to 19 August. 14 parachuters, from 7 nations, participated in the tournament. The competition took place at Ogata Athletic Field in Ōgata.

== Competition format ==
A total of nine rounds were contested. After sixth round six athletes were eliminated. In round seven athletes had to jump three times. The best four parachuters qualifies to the final rounds. Athlete with the lowest score is a winner.

== Results ==
Rank	Nation	Athlete	R1	R2	R3	R4	R5	R6	Sum	R7	R8	R9
1st place, gold medalist(s)	Germany	Marco Pflüger	0.01	0.01	0.00	0.00	0.00	0.00	0.02	0.01	0.00	0.04
2nd place, silver medalist(s)	China	Wang Jianming	0.00	0.00	0.01	0.05	0.00	0.01	0.03	0.01	0.01	0.04
3rd place, bronze medalist(s)	China	Wei Ning	0.02	0.00	0.00	0.01	0.00	0.00	0.03	0.00	0.16	0.02
4	China	Zheng Hongyan	0.00	0.02	0.00	0.03	0.01	0.00	0.06	0.01	0.06	0.04
5	France	Olivier Henaff	0.03	0.03	0.00	0.01	0.00	0.00	0.06	0.01		
6	Slovenia	Irena Avbelj	0.01	0.02	0.02	0.00	0.01	0.00	0.07	0.04		
7	France	Philippe Valois	0.02	0.02	0.00	0.01	0.02	0.00	0.07	0.05		
8	Czech Republic	Ivan Hovorka	0.00	0.00	0.01	0.02	0.00	0.00	0.07	0.20		
9	France	Valerie Vanhove	0.00	0.00	0.04	0.06	0.00	0.00	0.10			
10	Slovenia	Borut Erjavec	0.02	0.12	0.00	0.00	0.01	0.00	0.15			
11	United States	Cheryl Stearns	0.00	0.02	0.00	0.16	0.01	0.03	0.22			
12	Poland	Monika Filipowska	0.16	0.04	0.00	0.06	0.02	0.01	0.29			
13	Japan	Katsuaki Nishi	0.03	0.03	0.16	0.05	0.04	0.04	0.35			
14	Japan	Kiyonori Yashiro	0.16	0.16	0.16	0.14	0.15	0.08	0.85			
