= Red Bull Stratos =

High altitude skydiving project

- Logo
- Date: 14 October 2012; 14 years ago
- Time: 09:30 MDT (15:30 UTC)
- Location: Roswell International Air Center, Roswell, New Mexico, United States; Launch site: 33.3109°N 104.5392°W Landing site: 33.3580°N 103.7849°W
- Also known as: Mission to the edge of space
- Participants: Felix Baumgartner
- Outcome: Balloon altitude record and sound barrier broken
- Website: redbullstratos.com

Red Bull Stratos, or the Red Bull Space Jump, was a high-altitude skydiving project involving Austrian skydiver Felix Baumgartner. On 14 October 2012, Baumgartner flew approximately 39 kilometres (24 mi) into the stratosphere over New Mexico, United States, in capsule N502FB carried by helium balloon before free falling in a pressure suit and then parachuting to Earth. The total jump, from leaving the capsule to landing on the ground, lasted approximately ten minutes. While the free fall was initially expected to last between five and six minutes, Baumgartner deployed his parachute after 4 minutes and 19 seconds.

Reaching 1,357.64 km/h (843.6 mph)—Mach 1.25—Baumgartner broke the sound barrier on his descent, becoming the first human being to do so without any form of engine power. Measurements show Baumgartner also broke two other world records. With a final altitude of 38,969 m (127,851 ft; 24 mi), Baumgartner broke the unofficial record for the highest manned balloon flight of 37,640 m (123,491 ft) previously set by Nick Piantanida. He also broke the record for the highest-altitude jump, set in 1960 by USAF Colonel Joseph Kittinger, who was Baumgartner's mentor and capsule communicator at mission control. These claims were verified by the Fédération Aéronautique Internationale (FAI).

Baumgartner's height record has since been surpassed by Alan Eustace.

== History ==
In January 2010, New Scientist reported that Baumgartner was working with a team of scientists and sponsor Red Bull GmbH to attempt the highest sky-dive on record, using a helium balloon. By wearing the Equivital LifeMonitor, researchers were able to monitor Felix Baumgartner's physiological response within an extreme environment. Baumgartner was going to make the 36,600 m (120,100 ft) jump from a capsule suspended from a balloon filled with helium, intending to become the first parachutist to break the sound barrier. This would be possible because while the normal terminal velocity of a skydiver freeflying is about 320 km/h (200 mph or 90 m/s), the high altitude with less-dense atmosphere would decrease drag. On 12 October 2010, Red Bull announced it was placing the project on hold after Daniel Hogan filed a lawsuit in California Superior Court in Los Angeles, California, USA in April, claiming he originated the idea of the parachute dive from the edge of space in 2004 and that Red Bull stole the idea from him. The lawsuit was resolved out of court in June 2011 and on 5 February 2012, it was reported that the project would be resumed.

== Preparation ==
Comparison of approximate altitudes of various objects and successful stratospheric jumps, and a graph of International Standard Atmosphere temperature and pressure

On 15 March 2012, Baumgartner completed the first of two test jumps, from 21,818 metres (71,581 ft). During the jump, he spent approximately three minutes and 43 seconds in free fall, claiming to have reached speeds of more than 580 kilometres per hour (360 mph), before opening his parachute. In total, the jump lasted approximately eight minutes and eight seconds and Baumgartner became only the third person to parachute safely from a height of over 21.7 kilometres (13.5 mi).

On 25 July 2012, Baumgartner completed the second of two planned test jumps, from 29,460 metres (96,650 ft). It took Baumgartner about 90 minutes to reach the target altitude and his free fall was estimated to have lasted three minutes and 48 seconds before his parachutes were deployed. Baumgartner landed safely near Roswell, New Mexico, USA. His top speed was an estimated 863 kilometres per hour (536 mph) according to Brian Utley, an official observer on site. The jump represented a personal best for Baumgartner. Joseph Kittinger, who parachuted from 31,300 m (102,800 feet) in 1960, became involved with the mission to advise Baumgartner and to help gather scientific data on next-generation full pressure suits.

== Mission ==
Attempt	Planned	Result	Turnaround	Reason	Decision point	Weather go (%)	Notes
1	9 Oct 2012, 11:40:00 am	Scrubbed	—	Weather	9 Oct 2012, 11:42 am		High winds at launch site.
2	14 Oct 2012, 9:30:00 am	Success	4 days 21 hours 50 minutes				

=== Aborted launch ===
The project's original scheduled launch on the morning of 9 October 2012 was delayed five hours because of weather problems. Technicians at the launch site also found that one of the capsule's communication radios was faulty. At 11:42 MDT, the launch was aborted due to a 40-kilometre-per-hour (25 mph) gust of wind at the launch site. The launch was rescheduled for the morning of 11 October, but the project's meteorologist announced that the date would again be postponed.

=== Launch ===
The capsule was launched from Roswell International Air Center at 09:30 MDT (15:30 UTC) on 14 October 2012, which was also the 65th anniversary of Chuck Yeager's Bell X-1 flight. The weather at launch was clear, with south-easterly winds blowing at 5.5 kilometres per hour (3.4 mph). The ground temperature was 14 °C (57 °F). Baumgartner's ascent took approximately 2 1/2 hours, after which the capsule levelled at approximately 38 kilometres (24 mi). A valve in the balloon was used to vent gas to control the ascent.

Shortly after passing the Armstrong limit, Baumgartner expressed concerns that his visor heater was not functioning properly. Mission Control continued with the mission, and 40 minutes later announced that the jump would continue regardless of the reported problem. An abort procedure—which would have seen helium vented from the balloon to allow the capsule to descend—was considered.

After approximately 2 1/2 hours of ascent, Baumgartner and mission control began the egress procedures. This involved depressurisation of the capsule, detachment of his umbilical air supplies, and adjusting the capsule interior ready for decamp. As the final checks were being undertaken, Kittinger said to Baumgartner, "OK, we're getting serious now, Felix".

=== Jump and descent ===
Fifteen minutes after the egress checks began, the pressure between the capsule and the outside stabilized and the door opened. One of the last items was for Baumgartner to enable his suit cameras.

At 12:08 MDT and at an altitude of 39 kilometres, Baumgartner jumped from the capsule. These images span the first five seconds of the jump.

Baumgartner dove forward off the ledge at 12:08 MDT (18:08 UTC); after 42 seconds of descent Baumgartner reached his maximum velocity—an unverified 1,342 kilometres per hour (834 mph). An uncontrolled spin started within the first minute of the jump which could have been fatal, but it ended at 01:23 when Baumgartner regained stability, though in a later press conference he likened the fall in the suit to "swimming without feeling the water" as he could not feel the air to give him a sense of direction. Baumgartner had an abort switch that would have allowed deployment of a drogue parachute, which would have arrested the spin but also would have prevented him from breaking any speed records.

After 03:40 of free fall Baumgartner radioed to Mission Control that his visor was fogging up, echoing his earlier concerns about its heating. After 04:16 minutes of free fall he deployed his parachute, which opened and arrested freefall at 4:20 minutes. At the deployment altitude Baumgartner could have continued to fall safely for another 20 seconds, but it was difficult for him to verify his exact altitude. At 12:17 MDT (18:17 UTC), approximately 9 minutes after jumping from the capsule, Baumgartner landed on his feet in eastern New Mexico. Baumgartner dropped to his knees and punched the air before being met by ground crews. A helicopter was dispatched to return Baumgartner to the Roswell base.

According to YouTube, the jump was viewed live by over 9.5 million users, setting a record for the "live stream with the most concurrent views ever on YouTube".

The capsule returned to the ground via its own parachute, and landed approximately 70.5 kilometres (43.8 mi) east of Baumgartner's landing site. While the capsule could theoretically be reused, the balloon was only made for a single use.

=== Analysis ===
On 22 February 2013, FAI announced that Baumgartner had broken three of the four planned records.

The jump records Baumgartner attained:

- Exit altitude of 38.9694 kilometres (24.2145 mi)
- Maximum vertical speed (without drogue) of 1,357.6 kilometres per hour (843.6 mph)
- Vertical distance of freefall (without drogue) of 36,402.6 metres (119,431 ft)

=== Timeline ===
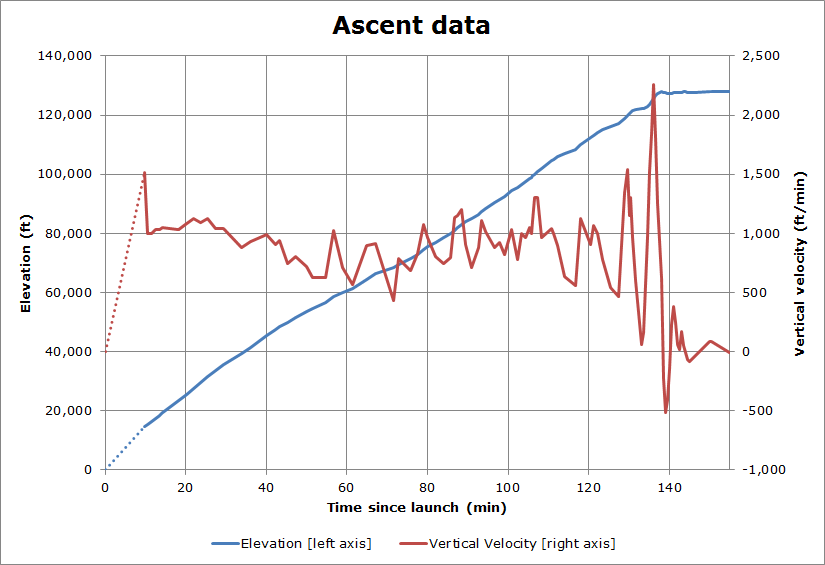

The timeline for the mission was split into eight stages. Stages 1 and 2 covered the balloon's ascent, stages 3–7 covered the descent and landing, and stage 8 covered the return of the balloon and capsule:

1. Launch of balloon with Baumgartner in capsule suspended below canopy
  - Completed at approximately 09:30 MDT (15:30 UTC)
2. Balloon reaches maximum altitude—38,969 metres (127,851 ft)—after a 2.5-hour ascent
  - Completed (38.969 kilometres (24.214 mi) reached)
3. Baumgartner de-pressurises the capsule, opens the door and jumps
  - Completed (jumped from capsule at approximately 12:07 MDT (18:07 UTC))
4. At approximately 30,000 metres (98,000 ft), Baumgartner reaches the speed of sound
  - Achieved Mach 1.25—1,357.64 kilometres per hour (843.60 mph)—after approximately 00:40 of freefall
5. After approximately 3:30 of freefall, air resistance slows Baumgartner as the atmosphere becomes denser
  - Parachute deployed at 4:16 and fully opened by 4:19, earlier than scheduled, preventing the duration milestone from being reached
6. Baumgartner deploys his parachute at approximately 2,500 metres (8,200 ft) above sea level, and 1500 m above ground level.
  - Completed
7. Approximately 5:00 of controlled parachute descent until landing
  - Completed at approximately 12:17 MDT (18:17 UTC)
8. Mission control remotely detach the balloon from the capsule; both descend to Earth to be recovered
  - Completed

- The following table shows the ascent of the capsule from ground to top altitude in altitude (ft) and velocity (ft/min) versus time (min).

Graph data
Data from mission page. Elevation shown above sea level.
Time, min	Elevation, ft(m)	Delta time, min	Speed, ft/min
0	3,671(1118)		0
9.77	14,800(4511)	9.77	1,515.36
10.47	15,500(4724)	0.70	1,000.00
11.47	16,500(5029)	1.00	1,000.00
12.43	17,500(5334)	0.97	1,034.48
13.40	18,500(5638)	0.97	1,034.48
14.35	19,500(5943)	0.95	1,052.63
18.23	23,500(7162)	3.88	1,030.04
20.08	25,500(7772)	1.85	1,081.08
21.87	27,500(8382)	1.78	1,121.50
23.70	29,500(8991.6)	1.83	1,090.91
25.48	31,500	1.78	1,121.50
27.40	33,500	1.92	1,043.48
29.32	35,500	1.92	1,043.48
33.85	39,500	4.53	882.35
36.00	41,500	2.15	930.23
40.03	45,500	4.03	991.74
42.23	47,500	2.20	909.09
43.30	48,500	1.07	937.50
45.32	50,000	2.02	743.80
47.18	51,500	1.87	803.57
49.95	53,500	2.77	722.89
51.55	54,500	1.60	625.00
54.75	56,500	3.20	625.00
56.70	58,500	1.95	1,025.64
58.80	60,000	2.10	714.29
61.45	61,500	2.65	566.04
64.78	64,500	3.33	900.00
66.97	66,500	2.18	916.03
71.58	68,500	4.62	433.21
72.85	69,500	1.27	789.47
75.77	71,500	2.92	685.71
77.57	73,000	1.80	833.33
78.97	74,500	1.40	1,071.43
80.00	75,500	1.03	967.74
81.87	77,000	1.87	803.57
83.88	78,500	2.02	743.80
85.77	80,000	1.88	796.46
86.65	81,000	0.88	1,132.08
87.52	82,000	0.87	1,153.85
88.35	83,000	0.83	1,200.00
89.45	84,000	1.10	909.09
90.85	85,000	1.40	714.29
92.55	86,500	1.70	882.35
93.45	87,500	0.90	1,111.11
94.43	88,500	0.98	1,016.95
96.70	90,500	2.27	882.35
97.78	91,500	1.08	923.08
99.00	92,500	1.22	821.92
100.93	94,500	1.93	1,034.48
102.22	95,500	1.28	779.22
103.22	96,500	1.00	1,000.00
104.25	97,500	1.03	967.74
105.20	98,500	0.95	1,052.63
105.70	99,000	0.50	1,000.00
106.15	99,500	0.45	1,111.11
106.53	100,000	0.38	1,304.35
107.30	101,000	0.77	1,304.35
108.33	102,000	1.03	967.74
110.73	104,500	2.40	1,041.67
111.23	105,000	0.50	1,000.00
112.35	106,000	1.12	895.52
113.93	107,000	1.58	631.58
116.63	108,500	2.70	555.56
117.97	110,000	1.33	1,125.00
120.50	112,288	2.53	903.16
121.17	113,000	0.67	1,068.00
122.17	114,000	1.00	1,000.00
123.45	115,000	1.28	779.22
125.30	116,000	1.85	540.54
127.43	117,000	2.13	468.75
128.92	119,000	1.48	1,348.31
129.57	120,000	0.65	1,538.46
130.00	120,500	0.43	1,153.85
130.38	121,000	0.38	1,304.35
130.90	121,500	0.52	967.74
131.73	122,000	0.83	600.00
133.00	122,077	1.27	60.79
133.50	122,157	0.50	160.00
134.00	122,439	0.50	564.00
134.50	122,925	0.50	972.00
135.00	123,687	0.50	1,524.00
135.50	124,608	0.50	1,842.00
136.00	125,737	0.50	2,258.00
136.50	126,641	0.50	1,808.00
137.00	127,268	0.50	1,254.00
138.00	127,889	1.00	621.00
138.50	127,774	0.50	(230.00)
139.00	127,518	0.50	(512.00)
139.50	127,314	0.50	(408.00)
140.00	127,242	0.50	(144.00)
140.50	127,357	0.50	230.00
141.00	127,547	0.50	380.00
141.50	127,672	0.50	250.00
142.00	127,701	0.50	58.00
142.50	127,708	0.50	14.00
143.00	127,794	0.50	172.00
143.50	127,818	0.50	48.00
144.00	127,815	0.50	(6.00)
144.50	127,783	0.50	(64.00)
145.00	127,741	0.50	(84.00)
146.00	127,688	1.00	(53.00)
150.00	128,043	4.00	88.75
150.50	128,087	0.50	88.00
155.00	128,057	4.50	(6.67)
Time, min	Elevation, ft	Delta time, min	Speed, ft/min

== Scientific benefits ==
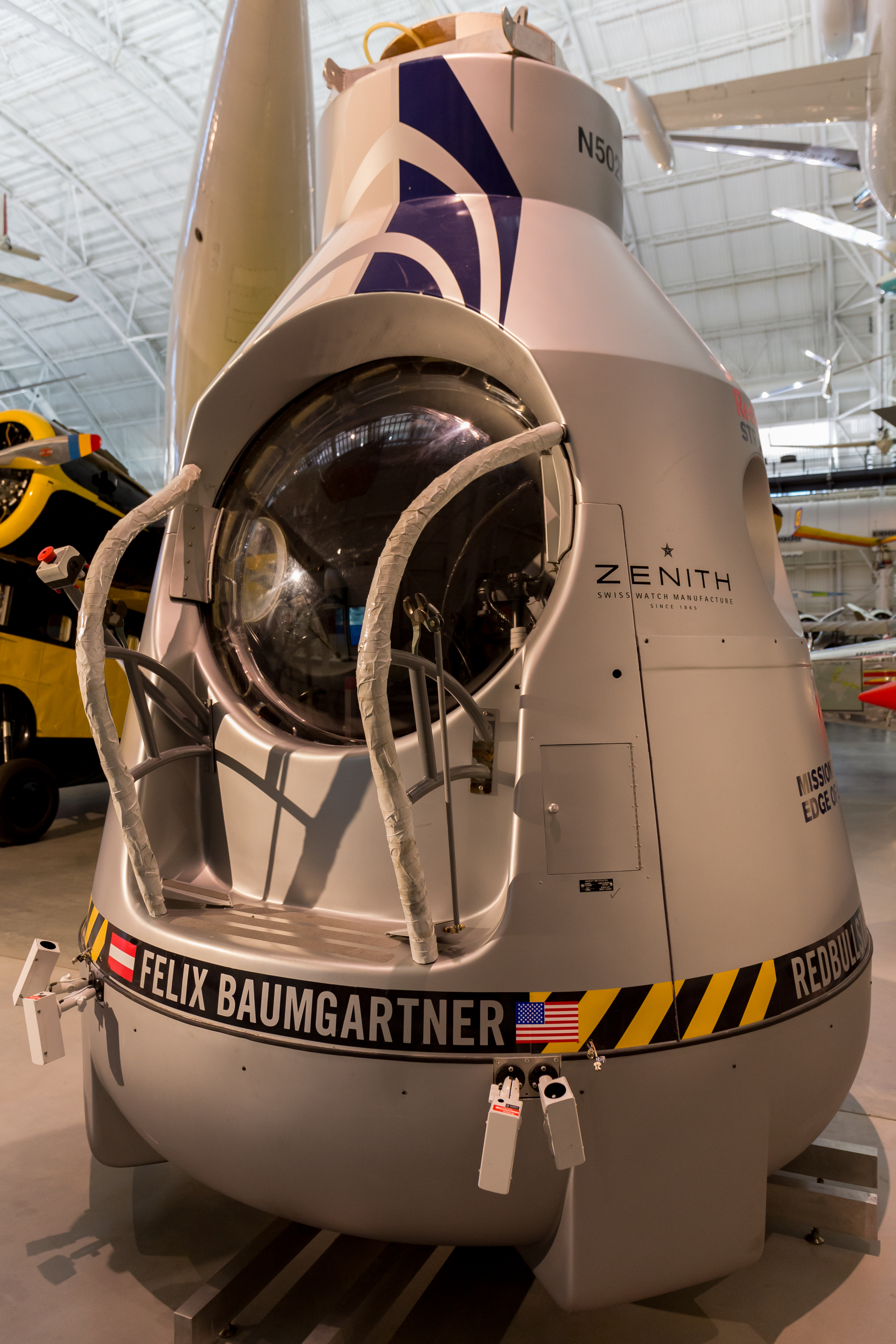
The Red Bull Stratos capsule on display at the Steven F. Udvar-Hazy Center

There were many unknowns about what would happen with Baumgartner when he jumped, the biggest of which was what breaking the sound barrier would do to his body. Gathered information on the feasibility of high-altitude bailouts will be useful to the budding commercial space-flight industry. Jonathan Clark, medical director of the project, said:

We'll be setting new standards for aviation. Never before has anyone reached the speed of sound without being in an aircraft. Red Bull Stratos is testing new equipment and developing the procedures for inhabiting such high altitudes as well as enduring such extreme acceleration. The aim is to improve the safety for space professionals as well as potential space tourists.

The project provided data for the development of high-performance, high-altitude parachute systems. It has been stated these will inform the development of new ideas for emergency evacuation from vehicles, such as spacecraft, passing through the stratosphere.

== Controversy ==
While the jump altitude was generally described as the "edge of space" in the media, critics questioned that label, pointing that the more scientifically accepted definition for the "edge of space" is the Kármán line at 100 kilometres (62 mi), or nearly three times the height of the project's jump altitude. The 100 km altitude is also used as a defining line by the Fédération Aéronautique Internationale, which administers aeronautics records worldwide.

The FAA and NASA set the border to space at 50 mi (80 km) altitude above sea level.

== See also ==
- Project Excelsior
- Alan Eustace
- Speed skydiving
