= Dolgovo =

Dolgovo Долгово
- Village
- Location within Vologda Oblast Location within Russia
- Coordinates: 59°24′N 39°43′E
- Country: Russia
- Region: Vologda Oblast
- District: Vologodsky District
- Time zone: UTC+3:00

Dolgovo (Russian: Долгово) is a rural locality (a village) in Kubenskoye Rural Settlement, Vologodsky District, Vologda Oblast, Russia. The population was 9 as of 2002. The village was originally named Bogoyavlensky after a Russian Orthodox bishop, but was later renamed in honor of Pyotr Dolgov, a Soviet colonel in the Airborne forces, who perished after a fatal accident during a high-altitude parachute jump in 1962. He was born into a family of farmers in this village.

== Geography ==
The distance to Vologda is 36 km, to Kubenskoye is 6 km. Kulemesovo, Midyanovo, Ileykino, Korotkovo, Nastasyino, Morino, Sopyatino, Okulovo are the nearest rural localities.
