= Pyotr Dolgov =

Soviet air force officer (1920–1962)

- Born: 21 February 1920; Bogoyavlenskoye (now Dolgovo) in Zemetchinsky District, Penza Oblast
- Died: 1 November 1962 (aged 42); Stratosphere, above Volsk, USSR (now Russia)
- Military career
- Allegiance: Soviet Union
- Branch: Soviet airborne forces
- Service years: 1940–1962
- Rank: Colonel
- Awards: Hero of the Soviet Union

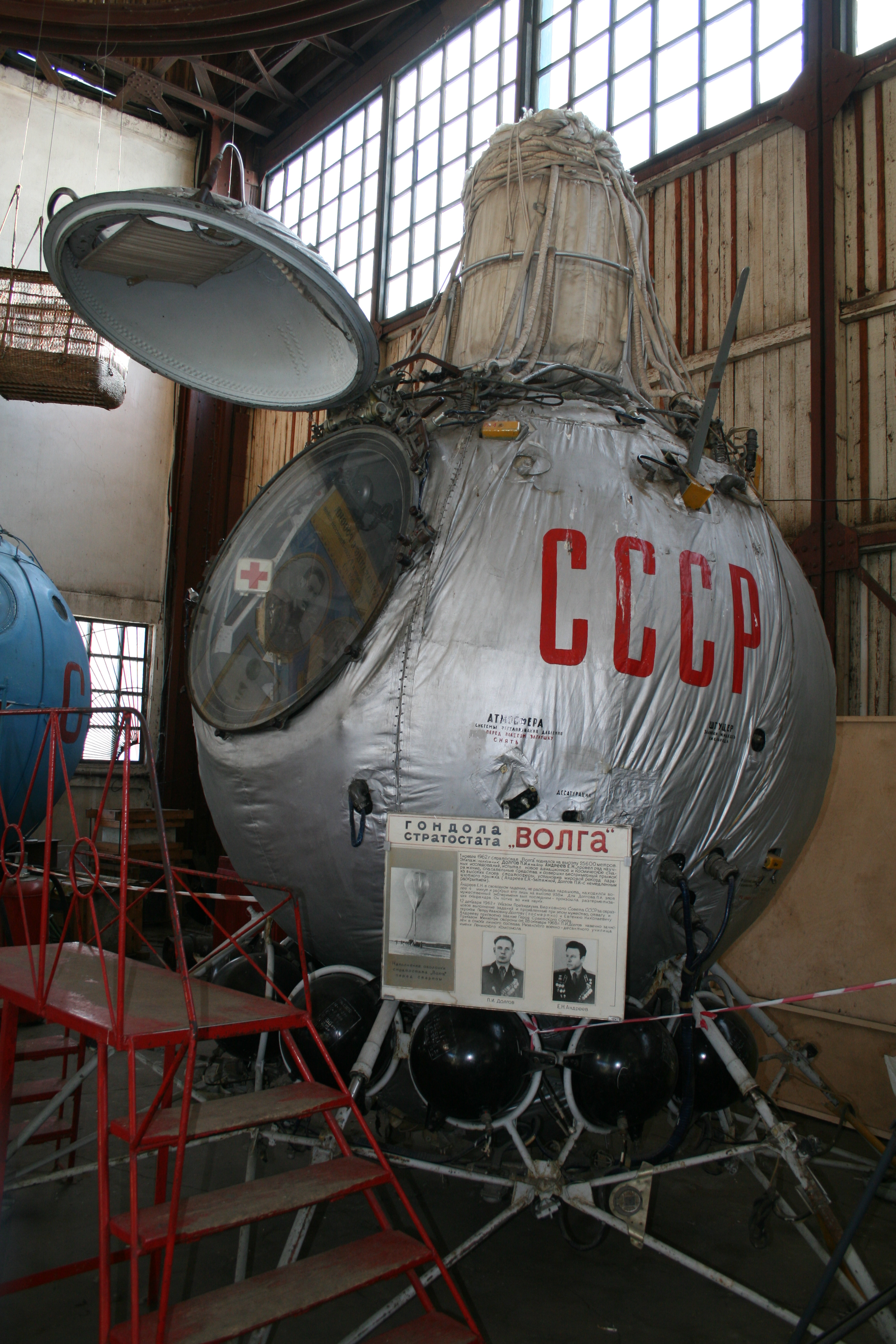
Volga balloon gondola from which Dolgov made his fatal jump

Pyotr Ivanovich Dolgov (Russian: Пётр Иванович Долгов; 21 February 1920 – 1 November 1962) (Hero of the Soviet Union) was a colonel in the Soviet airborne forces. Dolgov died while carrying out a high-altitude parachute jump from a Volga balloon gondola.

== Early life and career ==
Dolgov was born into a family of farmers in the village of Bogoyavlenskoye (now Dolgovo) in Zemetchinsky District, Penza Oblast. He served with the Soviet airborne in World War II. In January 1945, Dolgov became a company commander in the 350th Guards Rifle Regiment of the 114th Guards Rifle Division. Dolgov participated in the Budapest Offensive and the Vienna Offensive. On 6 April, Dolgov reportedly knocked out a self-propelled gun and killed 40 German soldiers. He was wounded but allegedly refused to leave the battlefield. Dolgov graduated from the Ryazan Higher Airborne Command School in 1947. He worked as a parachute tester. He made 1409 jumps, setting eight world and Soviet records.

He reportedly designed the ejection seats for the Vostok spacecraft.

== Death ==
On 1 November 1962, Dolgov and Major Yevgeni Nikolayevich Andreyev ascended in a Volga balloon gondola from Volsk, near Saratov, to make high-altitude parachute jumps. Andreyev successfully completed his jump. Dolgov, testing an experimental pressure suit, jumped at 28,640 metres (93,960 ft). The helmet visor of Dolgov's pressure suit hit part of the gondola as he exited, and the suit depressurized, killing him. On 12 December 1962, Dolgov was posthumously named a Hero of the Soviet Union.

If Dolgov's jump had been successful, he still would not have exceeded the record set by Joseph Kittinger for the highest-altitude parachute jump in history (31,300 metres (102,700 ft), 16 August 1960). The current world record is held by Alan Eustace (41,425 metres (135,909 ft), 24 October 2014).

== Legacy ==
At the time of Dolgov's death, the Soviet Army newspaper Red Star announced that he had died in the course of "carrying out his duties". Over the years there have been false reports that Dolgov actually died on 11 October 1960, in a failed flight of a Vostok spacecraft.

A fictionalized version of Dolgov's death (incorrectly dated in February 1961) appears in the short story "The Chief Designer" by Andy Duncan, which was published in Asimov's Science Fiction magazine and was a Hugo finalist.
