= Cheryl Stearns =

American skydiver (born 1955)

Medal record

Representing United States

Women's Parachuting

World Championships
Bronze medal – third place	2000 Toba, Japan	Overall Individual Style and Accuracy

Cheryl Stearns (born 14 July 1955 in Albuquerque, New Mexico) is an American skydiver.

She won the bronze medal in Women's Overall Individual Style and Accuracy at the XXV World Parachuting Championships in Japan in 2000.

== Career ==
Stearns made her first parachute jump in 1971 at the age of 17 in Coolidge, Arizona.

In 1977 she became the first female member of the Golden Knights, the U.S. Army's elite parachute team. She served two three-year tours. She served two active duty hitches with the Golden Knights in her military career. She retired from the army after 29 years of service as a master sergeant.

She earned a bachelor of science in aviation administration and a master of aeronautical science degrees from Embry Riddle Aeronautical University while managing both her military career and competitive skydiving.

Stearns began breaking world records and parachuting competitively early in her career, winning her first U.S. National Championship in 1977. She would go onto win the gold medal in the category "Overall, Women" at the World Championships in 1978 and 1994. She also holds the record for most parachute jumps made in a 24-hour period by a woman - 352 jumps from November 8–9, 1995.

She began flying for Piedmont Airlines in 1986, which later became part of US Airways and then American Airlines.

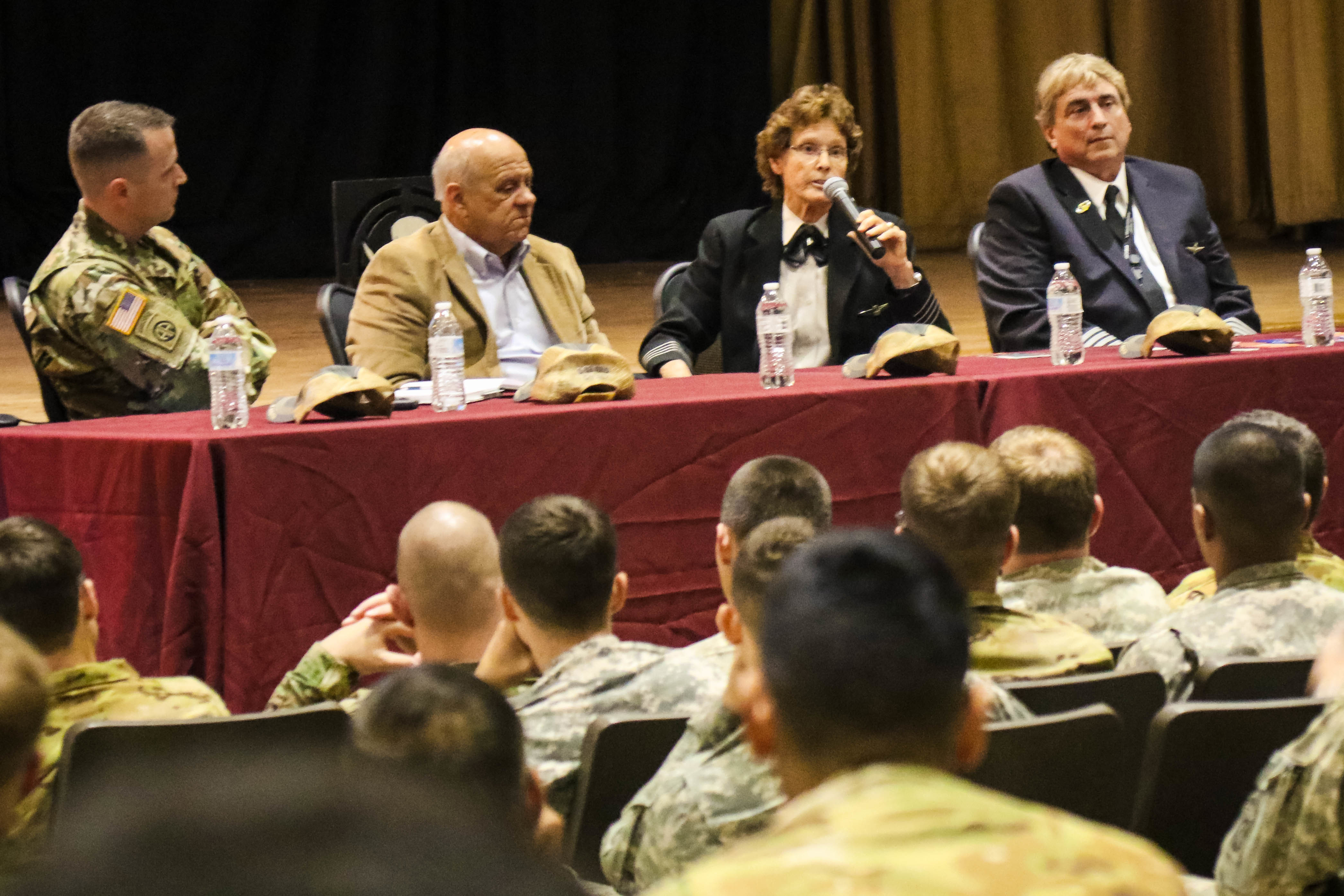
Retired U.S. Army Reservist, Master Sgt. Cheryl Stearns from the Army Parachute Team, Golden Knights, explains the hazards of poor planning to Paratroopers with 2nd Assault Helicopter Battalion, 82nd Combat Aviation Brigade during a safety stand down at York Theater on Fort Bragg, N.C., Nov 18. (U.S. Army photo by Sgt. Steven Galimore)

In the early 2000s, Stearns was involved in the StratoQuest project, which endeavored to break Joseph Kittinger's long-standing record for the highest altitude parachute jump ever, with a jump from at least 110,000 feet. The space diving project was put on hold while attempting to find sponsors for the jump's $6.5 million budget. By 2008 the project budget had risen to $8 million and was put on hold.

She holds the record for the most total parachute jumps made by a woman - 21,000 jumps as of June 14, 2019. By 2023, she had made over 22,000 jumps and has over 26,000 flying hours.

=== Accident and recovery ===
In 2014, while preparing for her 20,000th parachute jump, Stearns was hit by a car while riding her bike. She suffered a traumatic brain injury, which had a wide ranging impact on her memory and cognitive function. It took two years and one week after the accident for Stearns to recover her medical certification to fly. She retired as a commercial pilot in 2019.

== World Records ==
Date	Type of Record	Performance	Reference
13 May 1998	Accuracy Landing with 0.03 metre disc	6 consecutive landings on dead center + 1 cm	
20 Jun 1994	Lowest Single Round Score	6.63 sec	
02 Jul 1986	Accuracy Landing with 0.05 metre disc (group of 8)	2.88 m at the 2nd round	
10 Nov 1984	Night / Individual records, Accuracy Landing with 0.05 metre disc	0,03 m at the 14th round	
15 Nov 1982	Night / Individual records, Accuracy Landing with 0.05 metre disc	0,01 m at the 12th round	
14 Nov 1982	Day / Individual records, Accuracy Landing with 0.05 metre disc	0.02 m at the 16th round	

== Awards ==
- 1980, United States Women's Champion Skydiver of the Year
- 1989, United States Parachuting Association, Leonardo da Vinci Diploma Award
- 2003, named as one of the 100 Most Influential Women in the Aviation and Aerospace Industry by Women in Aviation International
- 2007, Arizona Aviation Hall of Fame
- 2007, Amelia Earhart Pioneering Achievement Award
- 2010, International Skydiving Hall of Fame.
- 2022, National Aeronautic Association's Wesley L. McDonald Distinguished Statesman and Stateswoman of Aviation Award, in honor of advancing the sport of skydiving and in recognition as the first member of the Golden Knights.
- 2022, United States Parachuting Association Gold Medal of Meritorious Service
