= Yevgeny Andreyev (colonel) =

Soviet air force colonel (1926–2000)

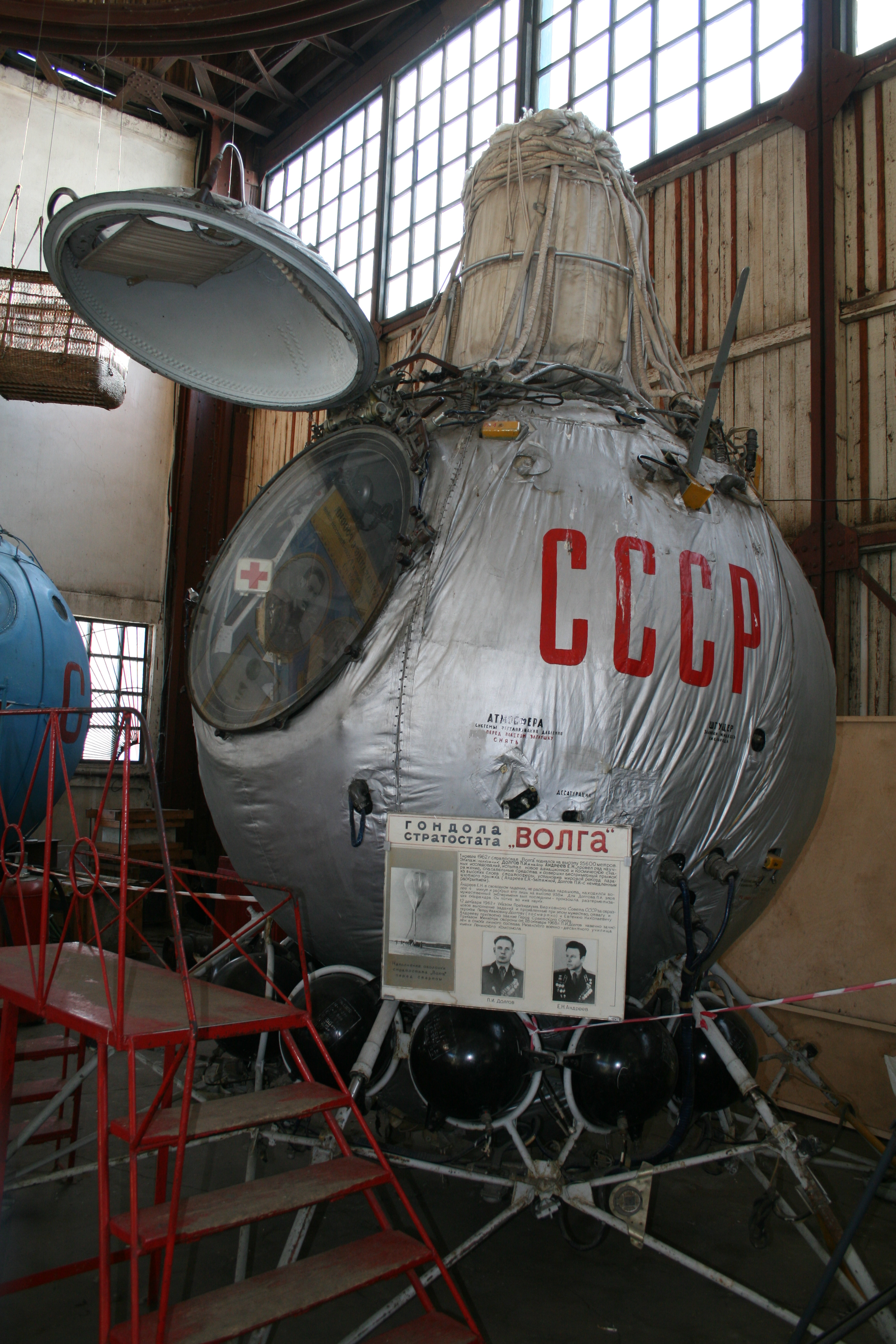
- The Volga balloon gondola with his portrait at right
- Born: Yevgeny Nikolayevich Andreyev; 4 September 1926
- Died: 9 February 2000 (aged 73)
- Allegiance: Soviet Union
- Rank: Colonel
- Awards: Hero of the Soviet Union

Yevgeny Nikolayevich Andreyev (Russian: Евгений Андреев; 4 September 1926 – 9 February 2000) was a colonel in the Soviet Air Force. He set an official record for the longest-distance free-fall parachute jump on 1 November 1962, which the Guinness Book of Records put at 24,500 metres (80,400 ft). The previous record holder for highest free-fall jump was Joseph Kittinger. Although Andreyev did not break the record for highest parachute jump, also held by Kittinger, Kittinger's jump was stabilized by a drogue parachute and therefore not free-fall. Andreyev was awarded the Hero of the Soviet Union for his feat.

Andreyev's record stood until 2012, when Felix Baumgartner broke it with a jump from 39,000 metres (128,000 ft).

== Early life ==
Andreyev was born on 4 September 1926 in the city of Novosibirsk, Russia. From 1937 to 1942 he was brought up in an orphanage in Serov, Sverdlovsk Region. He worked in a factory in the city of Nizhny Tagil. He was in the Soviet Army in 1943. He studied at the School of Armavir pilots.

In 1955 he graduated from the Ryazan Airborne School. After graduation he participated in a test of parachute systems on 1 November 1962 as part of a secret experiment conducted by the head of the Soviet space program Sergey Korolev. From 1972 to 1991, he was a member of the CPSU.

== Career and death ==
On 1 November 1962, Andreyev and Pyotr Dolgov ascended from Volsk, near Saratov. Andreyev jumped from the capsule at 25,458 metres (83,524 ft) and free-fell 24,500 metres (80,400 ft) before successfully deploying his parachute.

By decree of the Presidium of the Supreme Soviet of the USSR on 12 December 1962 for courage and heroism shown during the trial of the parachute equipment, Evgeny Andreyev was awarded the title Hero of the Soviet Union with the award of the Order of Lenin and Gold Star medal (№ 11092).

Andreyev was a Master of Sports in the former USSR and holder of FAI Sporting Licence #3812.

In 1985, Andreyev, one of the first in the country, was awarded the honorary title of Honored skydiver test the USSR, badge number 3.

In total, he made eight jumps from the stratosphere.

He lived in the village Chkalovsky, Moscow region. He died on 9 February 2000 and is buried in the cemetery of the village Leoniha of Schyolkovo district, Moscow region.

== See also ==
- Parachuting
- Space diving
