= Nick Piantanida =

American amateur parachute jumper (1932-1966)

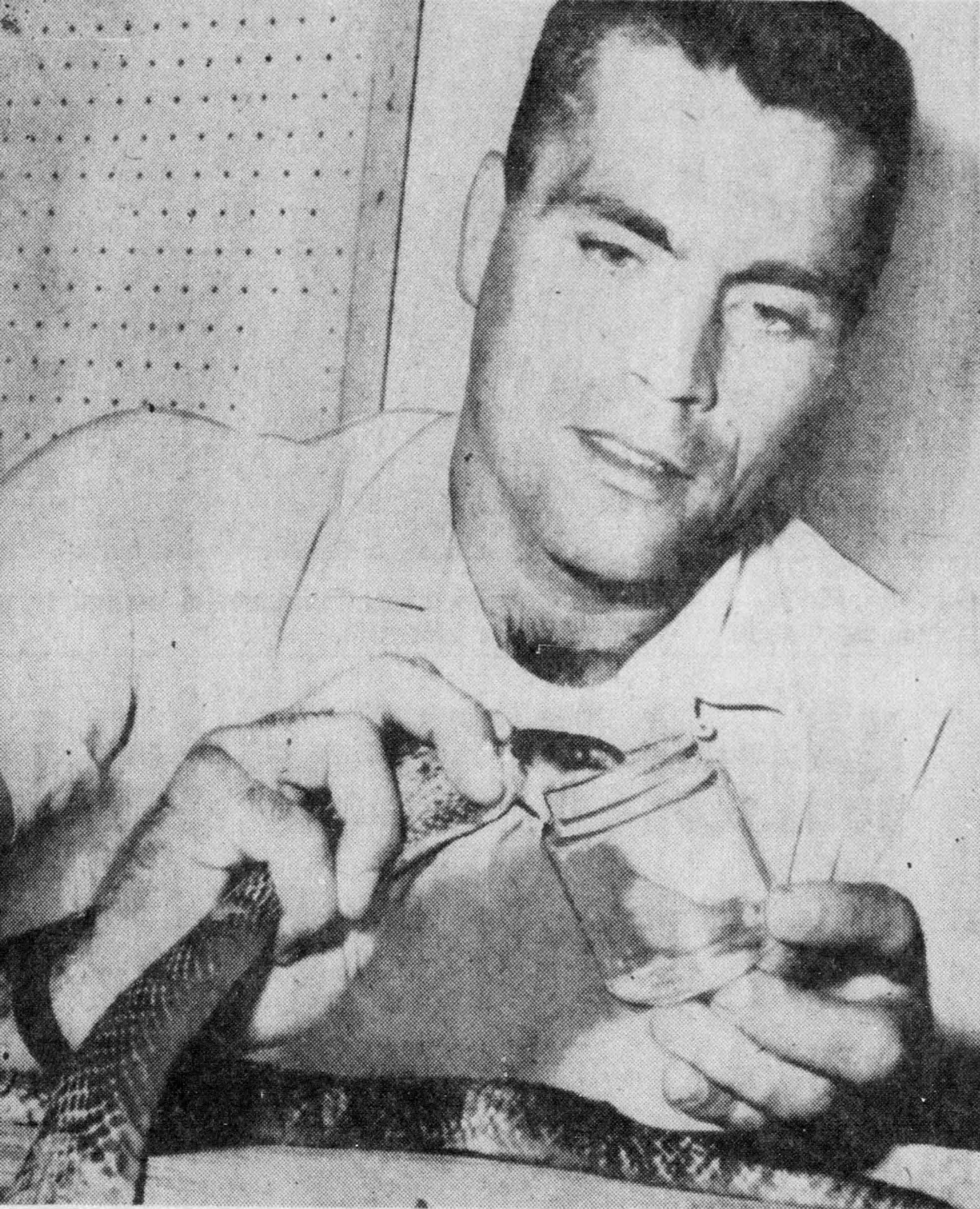
- Piantanida in 1963
- Born: Nicholas John Piantanida; August 15, 1932; Union City, New Jersey, U.S.
- Died: August 29, 1966 (aged 34); Philadelphia, Pennsylvania, U.S.
- Known for: Setting balloon altitude record
- Spouse: Janice McDowell (1963–1966; his death)
- Children: 3

Nicholas John Piantanida (August 15, 1932 – August 29, 1966) was an American amateur parachute jumper who reached 123,500 feet (37,600 meters; 23.39 miles) with his Strato Jump II balloon on February 2, 1966, flying a crewed balloon higher than anyone before, a record that stood until Felix Baumgartner's flight on October 14, 2012.

== Early life ==
Piantanida was born August 15, 1932, to father Cvito Piantanida (1906–1994), and mother Katarina Piantanida (née Zarnečić; 1913–1995), a family of mixed Croatian-Italian descent. He grew up in Union City, New Jersey. He had a younger brother, Vern. When Piantanida was 10 years old, he experimented with homemade parachutes, harnessing a stray neighborhood cat to one in a test drop off the five-story apartment building where they lived. When a neighbor informed Piantanida's parents of this, Piantanida tested the next parachute himself, jumping off a lower roof and breaking his arm. As he grew older, he took up skydiving with a "dogged determination", according to his brother.

As a young man, Piantanida played basketball in East Coast leagues. After graduating from St. Michael's High School, where he played football, he joined the U.S. Army Reserve and shortly thereafter, the U.S. Army for two years, where he earned the rank of corporal.

After his military service, Piantanida and his climbing partner, Walt Tomashoff, became the first people to climb a route on the north side of Auyán-tepui, the plateau in Venezuela from which Angel Falls drops from a cleft near the summit. For this accomplishment he was interviewed on the Today Show.

After his return to the United States, Piantanida worked in an embroidery factory, played basketball at various colleges, and worked as an ironworker on the Verrazzano–Narrows Bridge.

== Skydiving career ==
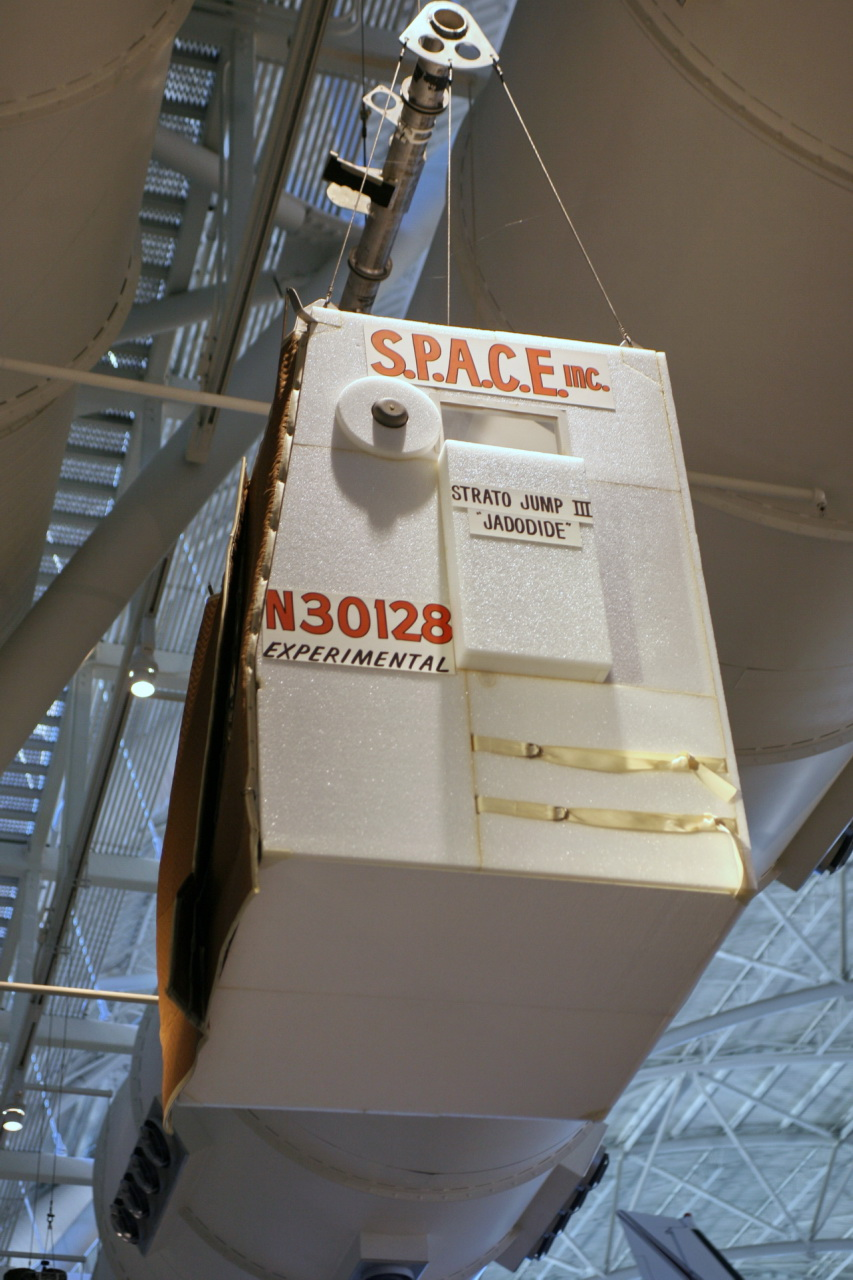
Strato Jump III gondola at the Smithsonian Institution's National Air and Space Museum

In 1963, Piantanida was living in Brick Township, New Jersey, and had a business selling pets when he discovered skydiving. One day after watching jumps at the then new Lakewood Sport Parachuting Center near Lakewood, he began taking lessons and jumping regularly. After making hundreds of jumps and earning a class D expert license, he learned of the 83,000-foot (25,000 m) jump from a balloon by Yevgeni Andreyev that gave the official world record for the highest parachute jump to the Soviet Union, and determined to bring the world record back to the United States. (The unofficial record, which Piantanida was also trying to break, was held by Joseph Kittinger of the U.S.)

Piantanida took a job driving trucks in order to give him time to train on weekends. He earnestly studied meteorology, balloon technology and survival systems. As author Craig Ryan put it, he "transformed himself into the director of a one-man aeronautical research program." He obtained money from sponsors, and, after lobbying by a United States Senator, the United States Air Force gave him access to training facilities and David Clark Company loaned him a pressure suit. He assembled a team of volunteers for an attempt at the world free-fall record.

On October 22, 1965, Piantanida made his first attempt at the record in his balloon named Strato Jump I. The attempt ended when a wind shear tore off the top of his balloon, ending the flight at just 16,000 feet (4,900 m) and forcing Piantanida to parachute into the Saint Paul, Minnesota city dump.

On February 2, 1966, in his second attempt, Piantanida launched in Strato Jump II from Joe Foss Field near Sioux Falls, South Dakota, and reached an unprecedented altitude of 123,500 feet (37,600 m). From that height he had planned to jump from the gondola to set a world record for the highest parachute jump, but was unable to disconnect himself from his oxygen line. He aborted the jump and detached the gondola from the balloon, returning to earth in the gondola without the balloon. Because he did not return to earth with his balloon, his unprecedented altitude is not recognized by the Fédération Aéronautique Internationale as a balloon altitude world record, and because he did not jump from the balloon's gondola at 123,500 feet, he earned no parachute altitude record.

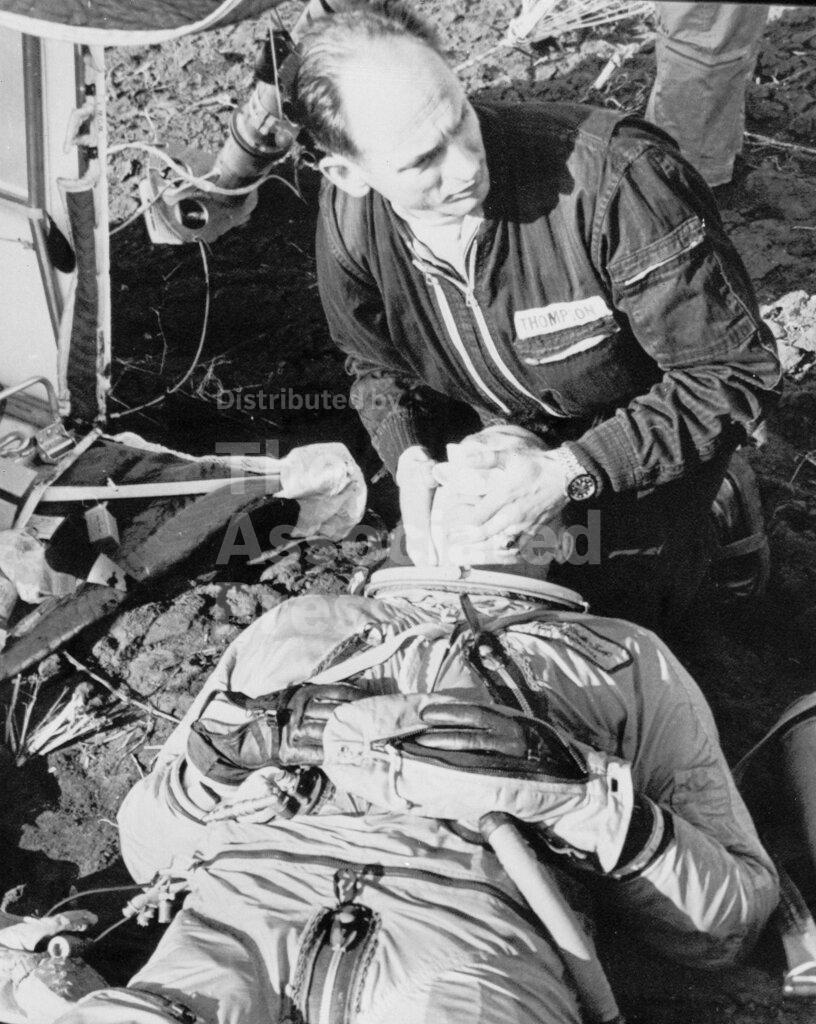
A doctor helps Piantanida breathe after Strato Jump III

His third attempt occurred on the morning of May 1, 1966. Piantanida donned a bright orange suit and parachute harness. Secured inside a styrofoam-insulated gondola about the size of a portable toilet, he began his ascent for a planned super-sonic free fall from over 120,000 feet (37,000 m). However, ground controllers listening to the communications link with the Strato Jump III were startled by the sound of a whoosh of rushing air and a sudden, cut-off call over the radio to abort. Piantanida's suit had depressurized at about the 57,000-foot (17,374 m) mark. Ground controllers immediately jettisoned the balloon at close to 56,000 feet (17,000 m) – higher than the cruising altitude for commercial jets – and for 25 minutes Piantanida's gondola parachuted to the ground. He barely survived the descent, having suffered massive tissue damage due to ebullism. The lack of oxygen left him brain damaged and in a coma from which he never recovered. Piantanida died four months later at the Veterans Hospital in Philadelphia, on August 29. He was buried in Holy Cross Cemetery in North Arlington, New Jersey.

The gondola of the Strato Jump III is preserved and displayed in the Boeing Aviation Hangar at the Smithsonian National Air and Space Museum's Steven F. Udvar-Hazy Center in Chantilly, Virginia.

== Personal life ==
Piantanida was Roman Catholic. He married Janice McDowell in 1963, and they had three daughters: Donna, Diane, and Debbie. He was a cousin of Nat Hickey.

A film based on his life, entitled Angry Sky, premiered at the Tribeca Film Festival on April 22, 2015, and on ESPN as part of the 30 for 30 series on July 30, 2015.
