= Joseph Kittinger =

American military pilot (1928–2022)

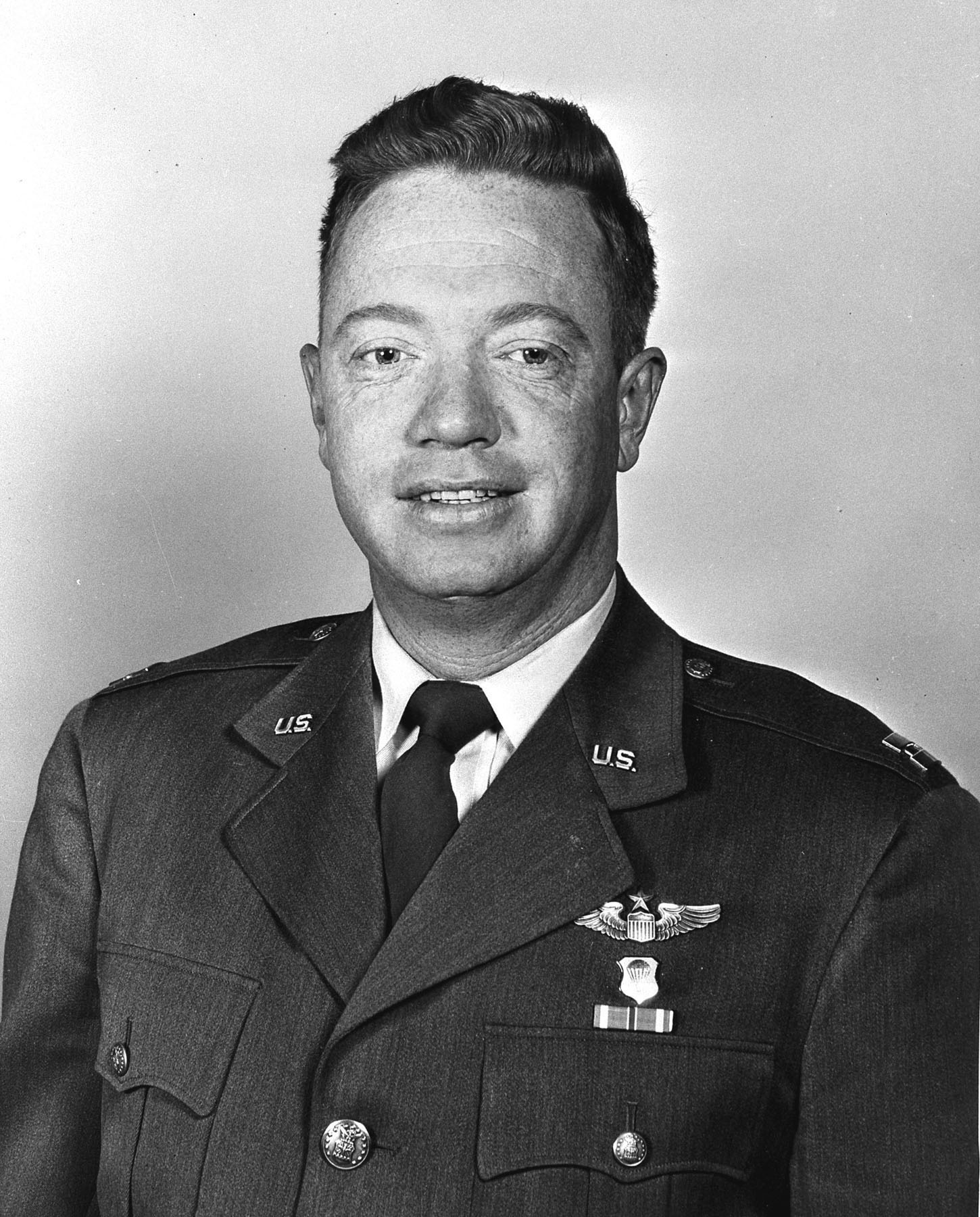
- Colonel Joseph W. Kittinger II, USAF (pictured as a captain); First person to conduct stratospheric space diving
- Born: Joseph William Kittinger II; July 27, 1928; Tampa, Florida, U.S.
- Died: December 9, 2022 (aged 94); Orlando, Florida, U.S.
- Burial place: Arlington National Cemetery
- Alma mater: University of Florida
- Military career
- Allegiance: United States of America
- Branch: United States Air Force
- Service years: 1949–1978
- Rank: Colonel
- Nickname: Red
- Conflicts: Vietnam War
- Awards: Silver Star (2); Legion of Merit (2); Distinguished Flying Cross (6); Bronze Star (Valor) (3); Purple Heart (2); Meritorious Service Medal; Air Medal (24); Prisoner of War Medal
- Other work: Vice President of Flight Operations for Rosie O'Grady's Flying Circus (1978–1992)

Joseph William Kittinger II (July 27, 1928 – December 9, 2022) was an American military pilot who was an officer in the United States Air Force. He served from 1950 to 1978 and earned Command Pilot status before retiring with the rank of colonel. He held the world record for the highest skydive—102,800 feet (31.3 km)—from 1960 until 2012.

Kittinger participated in the Project Manhigh and Project Excelsior high-altitude balloon flight projects from 1956 to 1960 and was the first man to fully witness the curvature of the Earth.

A fighter pilot during the Vietnam War, Kittinger shot down a North Vietnamese MiG-21 jet fighter. He was later shot down as well, subsequently spending 11 months as a prisoner of war in a North Vietnamese prison before he was repatriated in 1973.

In 1984, Kittinger became the first person to make a solo crossing of the Atlantic Ocean in a gas balloon.

In 2012, Kittinger participated in the Red Bull Stratos project as capsule communicator at age 84, directing Felix Baumgartner on his 24-mile (39 km) freefall from Earth's stratosphere, which broke Kittinger's own 53-year-old record. Felix Baumgartner's record would be broken two years later by Alan Eustace.

== Early life and military career ==
Born in Tampa, Florida, and raised in Orlando, Florida, Kittinger was educated at The Bolles School in Jacksonville, Florida, and the University of Florida. He became fascinated with planes at a young age and soloed in a Piper Cub by the time he was 17. After racing speedboats as a teenager, he entered the U.S. Air Force as an aviation cadet in March 1949. On completion of aviation cadet training in March 1950, he received his pilot wings and a commission as a second lieutenant. He was subsequently assigned to the 86th Fighter-Bomber Wing based at Ramstein Air Base in West Germany, flying the F-84 Thunderjet and F-86 Sabre.

In 1954, Kittinger was transferred to the Air Force Missile Development Center (AFMDC) at Holloman AFB, New Mexico. It was during this assignment that he flew the observation/chase plane that monitored flight surgeon Colonel John Stapp's rocket sled run of 632 mph (1,017 km/h) in 1955. Kittinger was impressed by Stapp's dedication and leadership as a pioneer in aerospace medicine. Stapp, in turn, was impressed with Kittinger's skillful jet piloting, later recommending him for space-related aviation research work. Stapp was to foster the high-altitude balloon tests that would later lead to Kittinger's record-setting leap from over 102,800 feet (31,300 m). In 1957, as part of Project Manhigh, Kittinger set an interim balloon altitude record of 96,760 feet (29,490 m) in Manhigh I, for which he was awarded his first Distinguished Flying Cross.

Project Excelsior

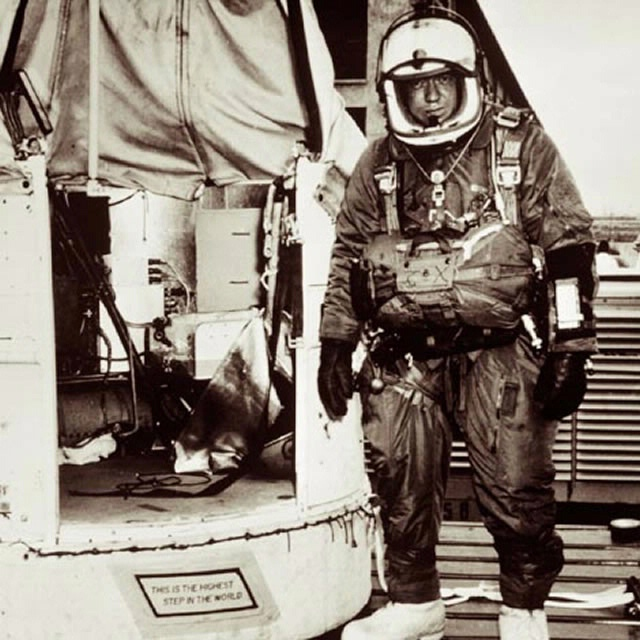
Kittinger next to the Excelsior gondola

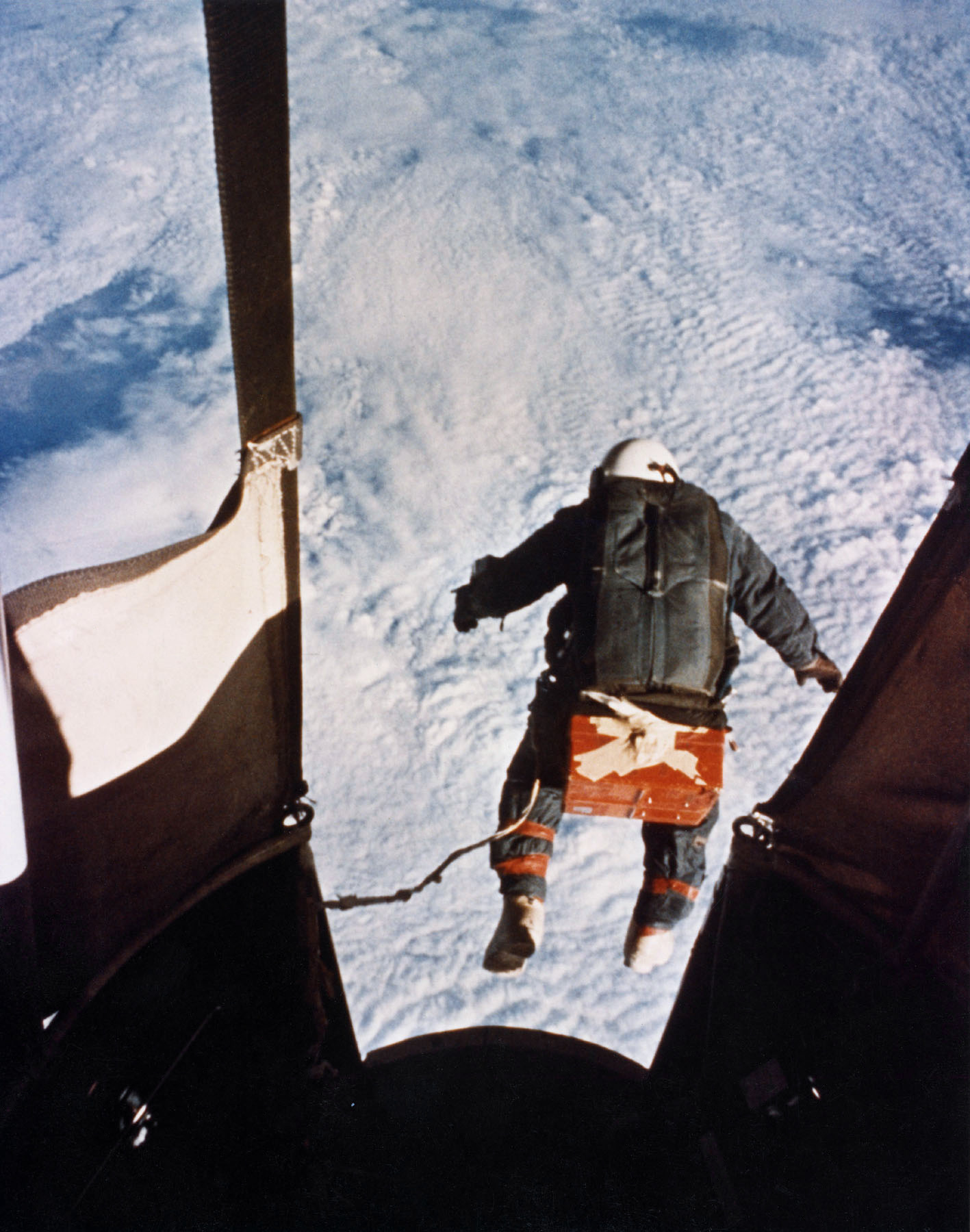
Kittinger's record-breaking skydive from Excelsior III

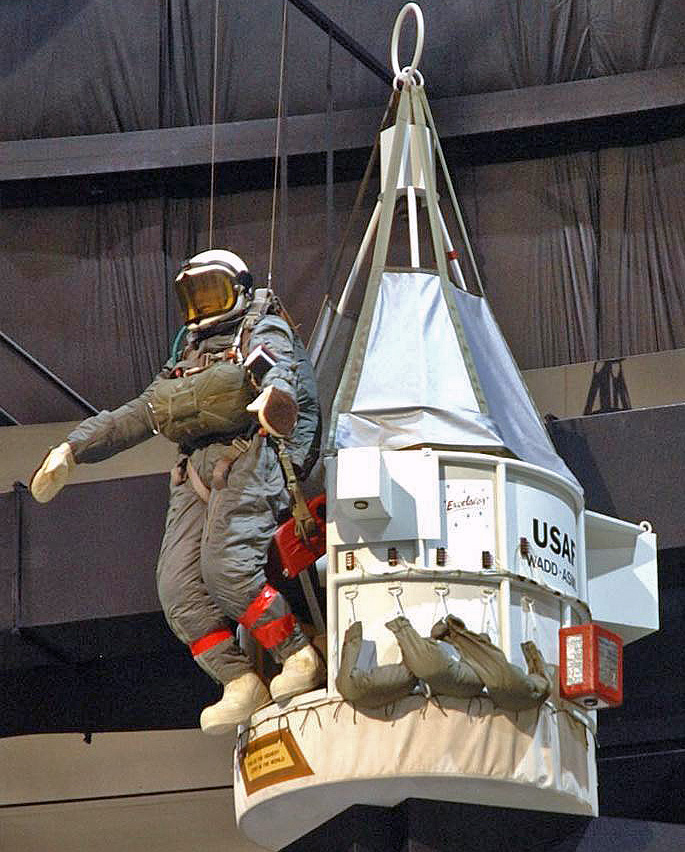
Replica of Excelsior III gondola and mannequin of Kittinger at the National Museum of the U.S. Air Force

== Project Excelsior ==
Captain Kittinger was next assigned to the Aerospace Medical Research Laboratories at Wright-Patterson AFB in Dayton, Ohio. For Project Excelsior (meaning "ever upward"), a name given to the project by Colonel Stapp as part of research into high-altitude bailouts, he made a series of three extreme altitude parachute jumps from an open gondola carried aloft by large helium balloons. These jumps were made in a "rocking-chair" position, descending on his back, rather than in the usual face-down position familiar to skydivers. This was because he was wearing a 60 lb (27 kg) "kit" on his behind, and his pressure suit naturally formed a sitting shape when it was inflated, a shape appropriate for sitting in an airplane cockpit.

Excelsior I: Kittinger's first high-altitude jump, from about 76,400 feet (23,300 m) on November 16, 1959, was a near-disaster when an equipment malfunction caused him to lose consciousness. The automatic parachute opener in his equipment saved his life. He went into a flat spin at a rotational velocity of about 120 rpm, the g-forces at his extremities having been calculated to be over 22 times the force of gravity, setting another record.

Excelsior II: On December 11, 1959, Kittinger jumped again from about 74,700 feet (22,800 m). For this leap, he was awarded the A. Leo Stevens Parachute Medal.

Excelsior III: On August 16, 1960, Kittinger made the final high-altitude jump at 102,800 feet (31,300 m). Towing a small drogue parachute for initial stabilization, he fell for 4 minutes and 36 seconds, reaching a maximum speed of 614 miles per hour (988 km/h) before opening his parachute at 18,000 feet (5,500 m). Incurring yet another equipment malfunction, the pressurization for his right glove malfunctioned during the ascent and his right hand swelled to twice its normal size, but he rode the balloon up to 102,800 feet before stepping off.

Lord, take care of me now.

— Kittinger, jumping from the balloon gondola Excelsior III at 102,800 feet

Of the jumps from Excelsior, Kittinger said:

There's no way you can visualize the speed. There's nothing you can see to see how fast you're going. You have no depth perception. If you're in a car driving down the road and you close your eyes, you have no idea what your speed is. It's the same thing if you're free falling from space. There are no signposts. You know you are going very fast, but you don't feel it. You don't have a 614-mph wind blowing on you. I could only hear myself breathing in the helmet.

Kittinger set historical numbers for highest balloon ascent, highest parachute jump, longest-duration drogue-fall (four minutes), and fastest speed by a human being through the atmosphere. These were the USAF records, but were not submitted for aerospace world records to the Fédération Aéronautique Internationale (FAI). Kittinger's record for the highest ascent was broken in 1961 by Malcolm Ross and Victor Prather. His records for highest parachute jump and fastest velocity stood for 52 years, until they were broken in 2012 by Felix Baumgartner.

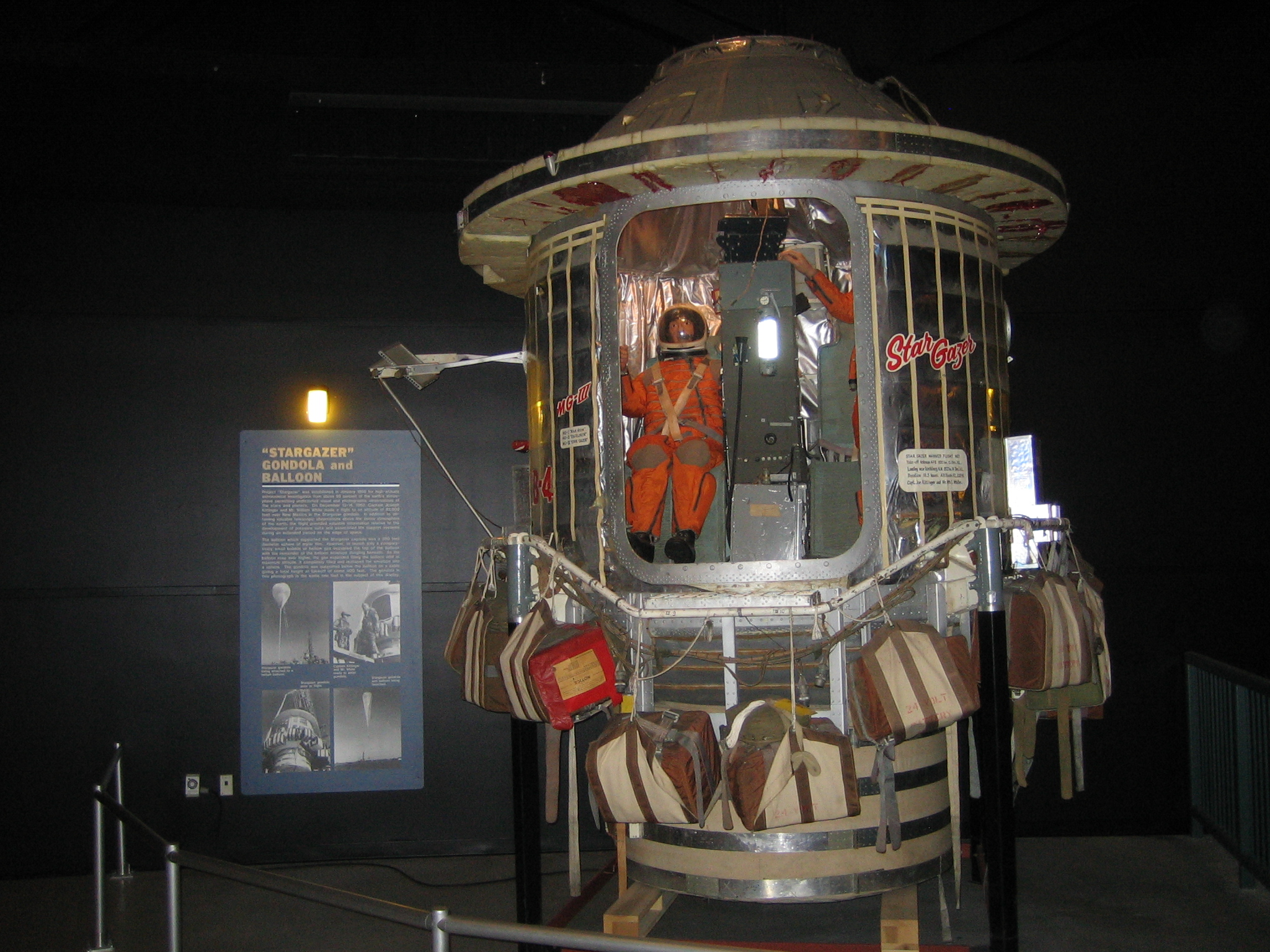
Stargazer gondola on display at the National Museum of the U.S. Air Force

For this series of jumps, Kittinger was profiled in Life magazine and the National Geographic Magazine, decorated with a second Distinguished Flying Cross, and awarded the Harmon Trophy by President Dwight D. Eisenhower.

Kittinger appeared as himself on the January 7, 1963, episode of the game show To Tell the Truth. He received two votes.

== Project Stargazer ==
Back at Holloman Air Force Base, Kittinger took part in Project Stargazer on December 13–14, 1962. He and the astronomer William C. White took a balloon packed with scientific equipment to an altitude of about 82,200 feet (25,100 m), where they spent over 18 hours and performed a number of astronomical observations. After the first flight, however, the project was canceled due to the NASA's recent ability to send astronauts into space, and launch satellites into Earth orbit.

== Later USAF career ==
In 1965, after returning to the operational Air Force, Kittinger was approached by civilian amateur parachutist Nick Piantanida for assistance on Piantanida's Strato Jump project, an effort to break the previous freefall records of both Kittinger and Soviet Air Force officer Yevgeni Andreyev. Kittinger refused to participate in the effort, believing Piantanida's approach to the project was too reckless. Piantanida died in 1966 as the result of a mishap suffered during his Strato Jump III attempt.

Kittinger later served three combat tours of duty during the Vietnam War, flying a total of 483 combat missions. During his first two tours he flew as an aircraft commander in Douglas A-26 Invaders and modified On Mark Engineering B-26K Counter-Invaders as part of Operations Farm Gate and Big Eagle.

Following his first two Vietnam tours, he returned to the United States and soon transitioned to the McDonnell Douglas F-4 Phantom II. During a voluntary third tour of duty to Vietnam in 1971–72, he commanded the 555th Tactical Fighter Squadron (555 TFS), the noted "Triple Nickel" squadron, flying the F-4D Phantom II. During this period he was credited with shooting down a North Vietnamese MiG-21 while flying an F-4D, USAF Serial No. 66-7463, with his WSO, 1st Lieutenant Leigh Hodgdon.

Kittinger was shot down on May 11, 1972, just before the end of his third tour of duty. While flying an F-4D, USAF Serial No. 66-0230, with his weapons systems officer, 1st Lieutenant William J. Reich, Kittinger was leading a flight of Phantoms approximately 5 miles (8.0 km) northwest of Thai Nguyen, North Vietnam, when they were engaged by a flight of MiG-21 fighters. Kittinger and his wingman were chasing a MiG-21 when Kittinger's F-4 was hit by an air-to-air missile from another MiG-21 that damaged the plane's starboard wing and set the aircraft on fire. Kittinger and Reich ejected a few miles from Thai Nguyen and were soon captured and taken to the city of Hanoi. During the same engagement, Kittinger's wingman, Captain S. E. Nichols, shot down the MiG-21 they had been chasing.

Kittinger and Reich spent 11 months as prisoners of war (POWs) in the Hỏa Lò Prison, the so-called "Hanoi Hilton". Kittinger was put through rope torture soon after his arrival at the POW compound and this made a lasting impression on him. Kittinger was the senior ranking officer (SRO) among the newer prisoners of war, i.e., those captured after 1969. In Kittinger's autobiography "Come Up and Get Me" (by Kittinger and Craig Ryan), Kittinger emphasized being very serious about maintaining the military structure he considered essential to survival. Kittinger and Reich were returned to American hands during Operation Homecoming on March 28, 1973, and they continued their Air Force careers, with Kittinger having been promoted to full colonel while in captivity. Following his return, Colonel Kittinger attended and graduated from the Air War College at Maxwell AFB, Alabama and concurrently completed requirements for a bachelor's degree via an extension center of Tulane University.

Following completion of the Air War College, Kittinger became the vice commander of the 48th Tactical Fighter Wing at RAF Lakenheath, United Kingdom, where he again flew the F-4 Phantom II. In 1977, he transferred to Headquarters, 12th Air Force, at Bergstrom AFB, Texas, retiring from the U.S. Air Force in 1978.

Kittinger accumulated 7,679 flying hours in the U.S. Air Force, including 948 combat flying hours during three tours during the Vietnam War. In addition, he flew over 9,100 hours in various civilian aircraft.

== Military awards and decorations ==
Kittinger received the following awards and decorations during his USAF career:

USAF Command Pilot wings
Master Parachutist Badge
Silver Star w/ 1 bronze oak leaf cluster
Legion of Merit w/ 1 bronze oak leaf cluster	Distinguished Flying Cross w/ 1 silver oak leaf cluster	Bronze Star Medal w/ Valor device and 2 bronze oak leaf clusters
Purple Heart w/ 1 bronze oak leaf cluster	Meritorious Service Medal	Air Medal w/ 4 silver oak leaf clusters
Air Medal w/ 2 bronze oak leaf clusters	Air Force Commendation Medal	Presidential Unit Citation
Air Force Outstanding Unit Award	Prisoner of War Medal	Army of Occupation Medal
National Defense Service Medal w/ 1 bronze service star	Vietnam Service Medal w/ 1 silver and 2 bronze service stars	Air Force Longevity Service Ribbon w/ 1 silver and 1 bronze oak leaf clusters
USAF Marksmanship Ribbon	Republic of Vietnam Gallantry Cross with Palm	Republic of Vietnam Campaign Medal

== Award Citations ==
=== Silver Star citation (first award) ===
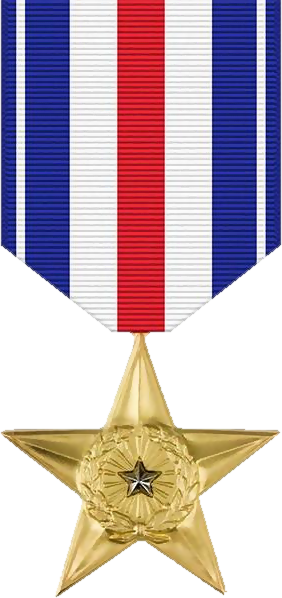

The President of the United States of America, authorized by Act of Congress, July 8, 1918 (amended by act of July 25, 1963), takes pleasure in presenting the Silver Star to Lieutenant Colonel Joseph William Kittinger, Jr. (AFSN: AO-190919/FR-52808/AD-14329714), United States Air Force, for gallantry in connection with military operations against an opposing armed force as an F-4D Aircraft Commander of the 432d Tactical Reconnaissance Wing, Udorn Royal Thai Air Base, Thailand, PACIFIC Air Force, in action over hostile territory in Southeast Asia, on 1 March 1972. On that date, Colonel Kittinger led a flight of two F-4D Tactical Fighters that provided cover from hostile aircraft for bombing operations in support of friendly forces. With complete disregard for his own personal safety, Colonel Kittinger aggressively engaged a superior number of hostile aircraft in aerial combat and successfully destroyed one enemy aircraft. By his gallantry and devotion to duty, Lieutenant Colonel Kittinger has reflected great credit upon himself and the United States Air Force.

=== Silver Star citation (second award) ===
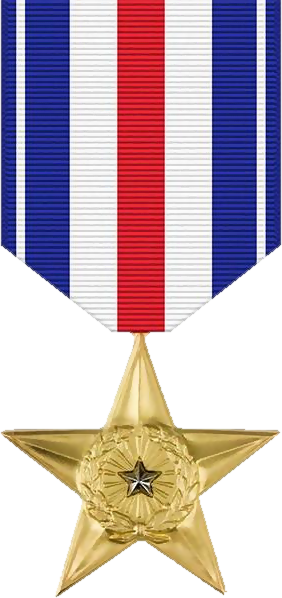

The President of the United States of America, authorized by Act of Congress, July 8, 1918 (amended by act of July 25, 1963), takes pleasure in presenting a Bronze Oak Leaf Cluster in lieu of a Second Award of the Silver Star to Colonel Joseph William Kittinger, Jr. (AFSN: AO-190919/FR-52808/AD-14329714), United States Air Force, for gallantry and intrepidity in action in connection with military operations against an opposing armed force during the period 11 May 1972 to 13 June 1972, while a Prisoner of War in North Vietnam. Ignoring international agreements on treatment of prisoners of war, the enemy resorted to mental and physical cruelties to obtain information, confessions, and propaganda materials. Colonel Kittinger resisted their demands by calling upon his deepest inner strengths in a manner which reflected his devotion to duty and great credit upon himself and the United States Air Force.

=== Legion of Merit citation (first award) ===
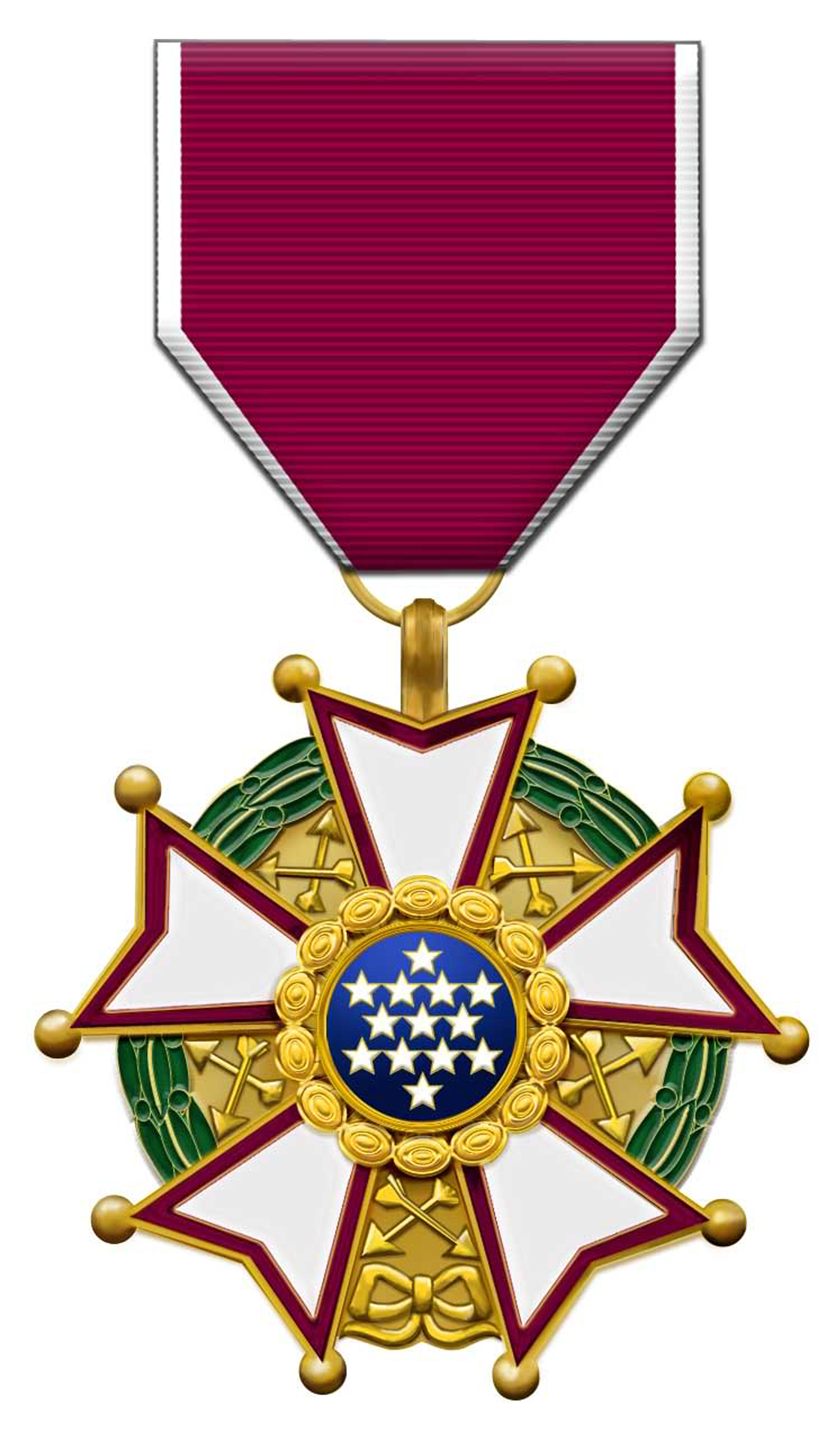

The President of the United States of America, authorized by Act of Congress, 20 July 1942, takes pleasure in presenting the Legion of Merit to Lieutenant Colonel Joseph William Kittinger, Jr. (AFSN: AO-190919/FR-52808/AD-14329714), United States Air Force, for exceptionally meritorious conduct in the performance of outstanding services to the Government of the United States as Air Operations Officer, Special Operations Center, Europe, J-3 Directorate, United States European Command, from July 1968 to July 1970. In this extremely sensitive position, Colonel Kittinger's personal initiative, exceptional knowledge of unconventional warfare and counter insurgency operations, coupled with a keen appreciation of the overall military and political objectives of the United States in Europe and in the North Atlantic Treaty Organization, contributed to decisions and programs of broad significance to the United States, the Department of Defense, and the United States European Command. Colonel Kittinger's professional competence, dedication, tenacity, and distinguished performance of duty reflect great credit upon himself and the United States Air Force.

=== Legion of Merit citation (second award) ===
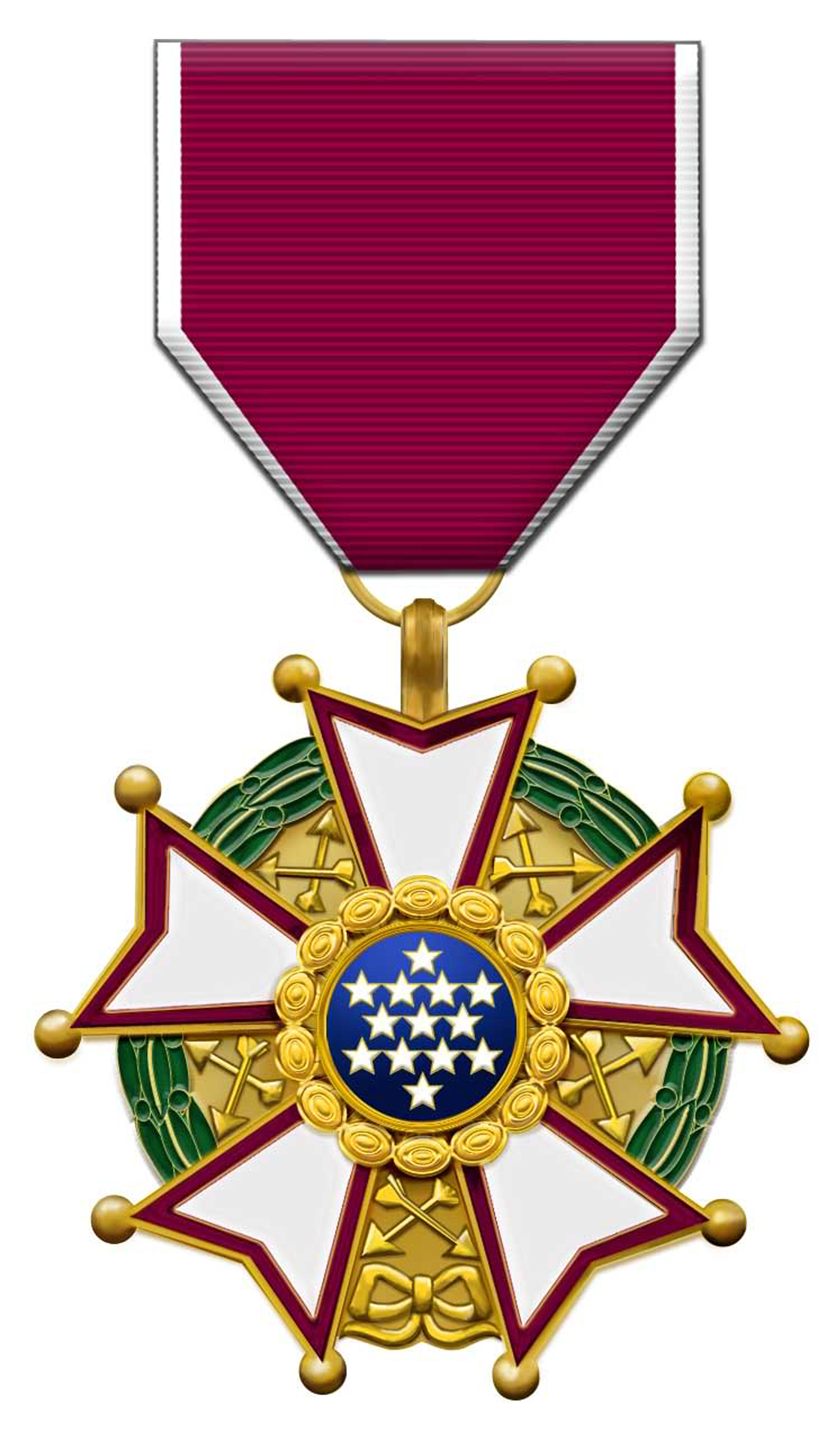

The President of the United States of America, authorized by Act of Congress, 20 July 1942, takes pleasure in presenting a Bronze Oak Leaf Cluster in lieu of a Second Award of the Legion of Merit to Colonel Joseph William Kittinger, Jr. (AFSN: AO-190919/FR-52808/AD-14329714), United States Air Force, for exceptionally meritorious conduct in the performance of outstanding services to the Government of the United States as the Chief, Ready Team Program Management, Headquarters, TWELFTH Air Force, Bergstrom Air Force Base, Texas, from 11 April 1977 to 31 July 1978. Under Colonel Kittinger's superior leadership, depth of knowledge and aggressive management ability, the transition of the 49th Tactical Fighter Wing from F-4 aircraft to the F-15 was accomplished without loss of combat effectiveness. Colonel Kittinger's direct personal contributions to the management of the planning and execution of major aircraft unit conversions have contributed greatly to the overall combat readiness of the Tactical Air Command. The singularly distinctive accomplishments of Colonel Kittinger culminate a distinguished career in the service of his country and reflect great credit upon himself and the United States Air Force.

=== Distinguished Flying Cross citation (first award) ===
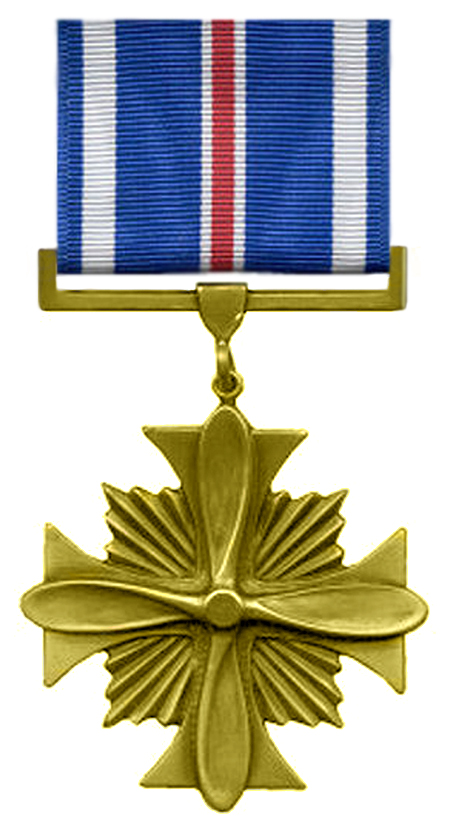

The President of the United States of America, authorized by Act of Congress, July 2, 1926, takes pleasure in presenting the Distinguished Flying Cross to Captain Joseph William Kittinger, Jr. (AFSN: AO-190919/FR-52808/AD-14329714), United States Air Force, for extraordinary achievement while participating in aerial flight on 2 June 1957 in performing a solo flight to an altitude of 97,000 feet in a gondola suspended from a plastic balloon. Scientific measurements made by Captain Kittinger constitute a valuable pioneering contribution to our knowledge of extreme altitude flight. Despite difficulties due to communications malfunction and a minor oxygen failure during the flight, Captain Kittinger remained emotionally stable and outstandingly effective in collecting and transmitting data, manipulating scientific instruments, taking pictures under extremely difficult conditions and relaying as much information as possible by Morse code to ground recorders. In preparation for this, he underwent many months of preparatory training during which he participated in parachute jumps, altitude chamber tests and free balloon flights. The contributions of Captain Kittinger to the first experimental flight of a human in the MAN-HIGH project reflect great credit upon himself and the United States Air Force.

=== Distinguished Flying Cross citation (second award) ===
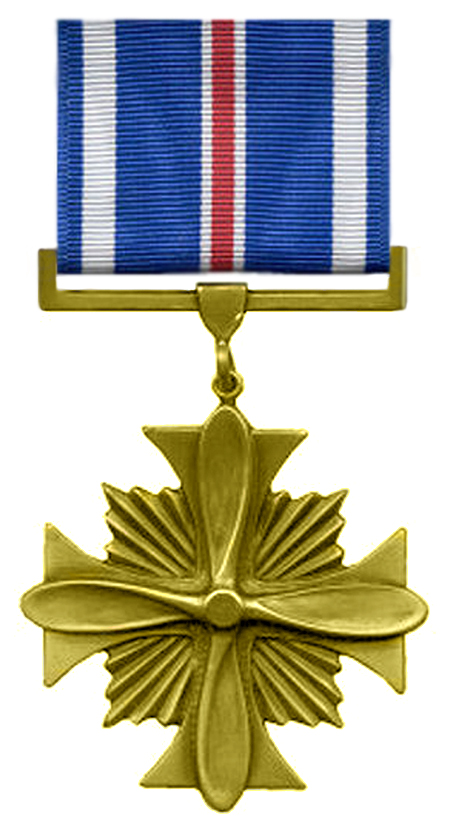

The President of the United States of America, authorized by Act of Congress, July 2, 1926, takes pleasure in presenting a Bronze Oak Leaf Cluster in lieu of a Second Award of the Distinguished Flying Cross to Captain Joseph William Kittinger, Jr. (AFSN: AO-190919/FR-52808/AD-14329714), United States Air Force, for extraordinary achievement while participating in aerial flight on 16 August 1960 near Holloman Air Force Base, New Mexico. On that date, Captain Kittinger made an open gondola balloon ascent to an altitude of 102,800 feet, surpassing all previous records. From this record altitude, Captain Kittinger successfully tested an experimental stabilization parachute system, free-falling for four minutes and thirty-eight seconds to an altitude of 17,500 feet where deployment of the recovery parachute occurred. By this historic achievement of national and international significance, Captain Kittinger has made a vital contribution to the advancement of aeronautical science. The personal courage, outstanding airmanship and selfless devotion to duty of Captain Kittinger reflect great credit upon himself and the United States Air Force.

=== Distinguished Flying Cross citation (third award) ===
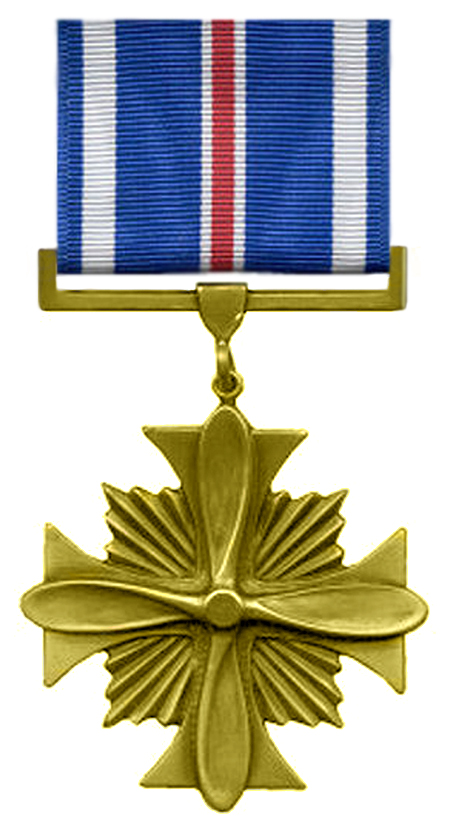

The President of the United States of America, authorized by Act of Congress, July 2, 1926, takes pleasure in presenting a Second Bronze Oak Leaf Cluster in lieu of a Third Award of the Distinguished Flying Cross to Major Joseph William Kittinger, Jr. (AFSN: AO-190919/FR-52808/AD-14329714), United States Air Force, for extraordinary achievement while participating in aerial flight as an Aircraft Commander over North Vietnam on 4 July 1966. On that date, while engaged in a night armed reconnaissance mission, Major Kittinger accepted a diversionary flak suppression mission against a highly defended target. Disregarding his own personal safety, Major Kittinger made repeated flak suppression attacks and flare passes over heavily armed targets. The professional competence, aerial skill, and devotion to duty displayed by Major Kittinger reflect great credit upon himself and the United States Air Force.

=== Distinguished Flying Cross citation (fourth award) ===
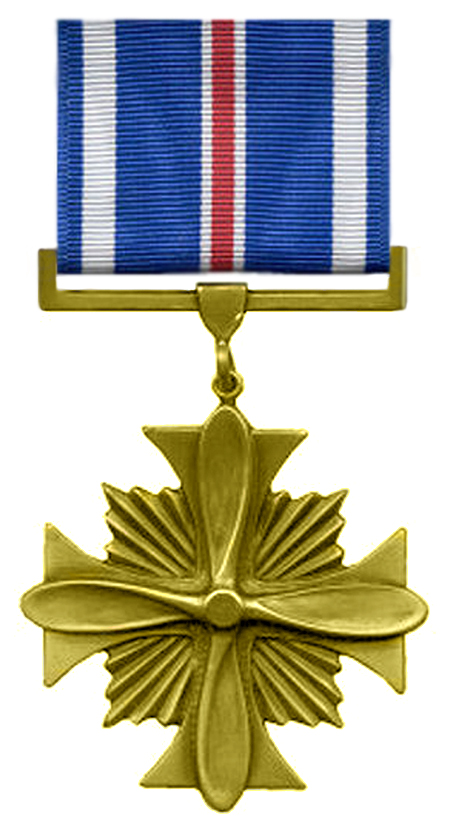

The President of the United States of America, authorized by Act of Congress, July 2, 1926, takes pleasure in presenting a Third Bronze Oak Leaf Cluster in lieu of a Fourth Award of the Distinguished Flying Cross to Lieutenant Colonel Joseph William Kittinger, Jr. (AFSN: AO-190919/FR-52808/AD-14329714), United States Air Force, for extraordinary achievement while participating in aerial flight as an Aircraft Commander over Southeast Asia on 16 November 1966. On that date, Colonel Kittinger willingly risked his life as he aggressively attacked hostile forces in the face of intense anti-aircraft fire. With full realization of the extreme hazards involved, Colonel Kittinger attacked the target repeatedly until he had expended all of his ordnance. This singular act of heroism resulted in the destruction of three active anti-aircraft positions, several fully loaded fuel trucks and was credited with causing several hostile casualties. The outstanding heroism and selfless devotion to duty displayed by Colonel Kittinger reflect great credit upon himself and the United States Air Force.

=== Distinguished Flying Cross citation (fifth award) ===
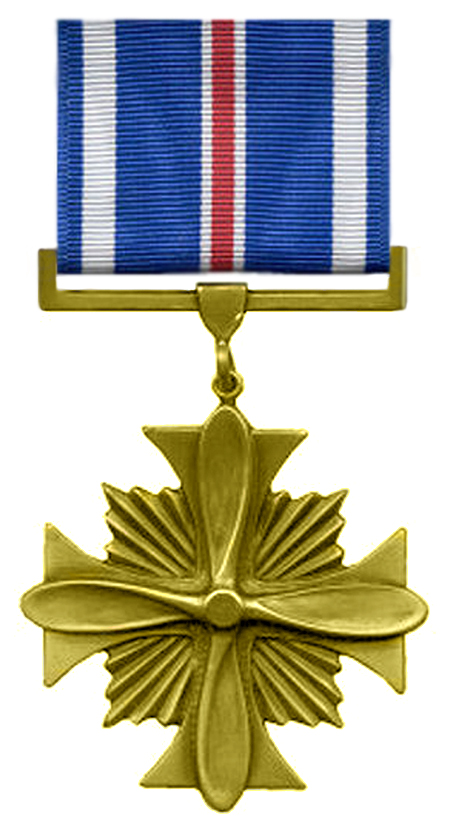

The President of the United States of America, authorized by Act of Congress, July 2, 1926, takes pleasure in presenting a Fourth Bronze Oak Leaf Cluster in lieu of a Fifth Award of the Distinguished Flying Cross to Lieutenant Colonel Joseph William Kittinger, Jr. (AFSN: AO-190919/FR-52808/AD-14329714), United States Air Force, for extraordinary achievement while participating in aerial flight as an F-4D Aircraft Commander over hostile territory on 18 April 1972. On that date, Colonel Kittinger led a flight of two F-4D Tactical Fighters that struck a heavily defended truck park and storage area. Despite marginal weather conditions and heavy ground fire directed at his aircraft, Colonel Kittinger's outstanding airmanship and leadership were directly responsible for the destruction of the target complex. The professional competence, aerial skill, and devotion to duty displayed by Colonel Kittinger reflect great credit upon himself and the United States Air Force.

=== Distinguished Flying Cross citation (sixth award) ===
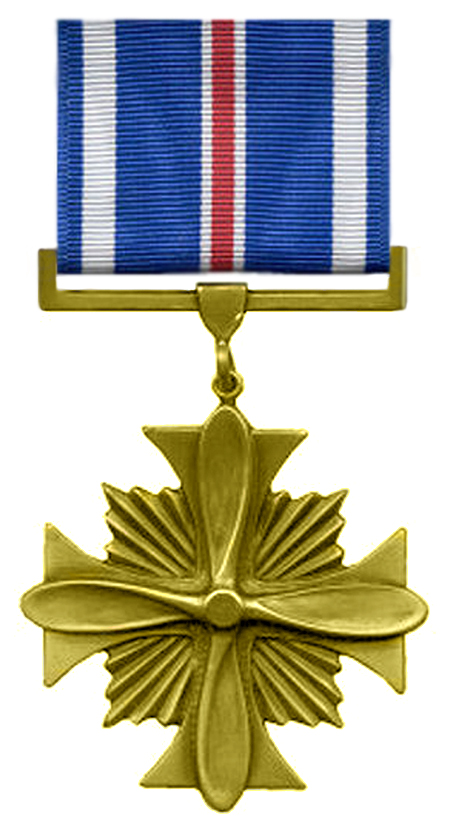

The President of the United States of America, authorized by Act of Congress, July 2, 1926, takes pleasure in presenting a Silver Oak Leaf Cluster in lieu of a Sixth Award of the Distinguished Flying Cross to Lieutenant Colonel Joseph William Kittinger, Jr. (AFSN: AO-190919/FR-52808/AD-14329714), United States Air Force, for extraordinary achievement while participating in aerial flight as an Aircraft Commander near Hanoi, North Vietnam, on 16 April 1972. On that date, Colonel Kittinger was flying an F-4D fighter aircraft on a mission to provide protection from hostile interceptors for sixteen strike aircraft hitting targets in the Hanoi area. While flying in extremely hazardous weather conditions and taking ground fire from heavy anti-aircraft guns and surface-to-air missiles, Colonel Kittinger successfully chased off two flights of hostile aircraft. The protection given the strike force by Colonel Kittinger resulted in the successful completion of a very difficult mission. The professional competence, aerial skill, and devotion to duty displayed by Colonel Kittinger reflect great credit upon himself and the United States Air Force.

=== Bronze Star citation (first award) ===
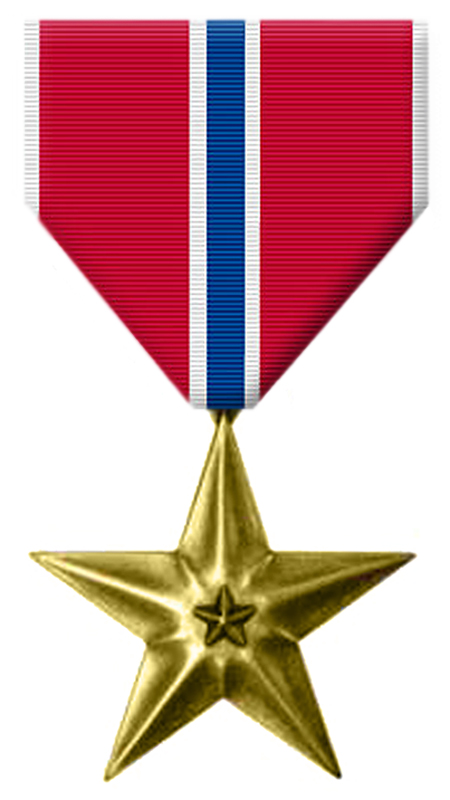

The President of the United States of America, authorized by Executive Order 11046, 24 August 1962, takes pleasure in presenting the Bronze Star Medal to Lieutenant Colonel Joseph William Kittinger, Jr. (AFSN: AO-190919/FR-52808/AD-14329714), United States Air Force, for meritorious service while engaged in ground operations against an opposing armed force in Southeast Asia as Operations Officer, Detachment 1, 603d Air Commando Squadron, from 14 July 1966 to 2 January 1967. During this period, Colonel Kittinger was responsible for effectively implementing all mission requirements of project "Big Eagle," an extremely important test and evaluation of A-26 aircraft in the night combat environment of Southeast Asia. These responsibilities included operational details involved in deploying the detachment from the United States to Southeast Asia, establishing operational needs and procedures for initiating the test and evaluation criteria necessary for the "Big Eagle" project, and supervision of all details concerned with maintenance and armament, scheduling, and development of combat tactics and mission profiles to accomplish the mission. These responsibilities were completed in a clearly superior manner. The exemplary leadership, personal endeavor, and devotion to duty displayed by Colonel Kittinger in this responsible position reflect great credit upon himself and upheld the highest traditions of the United States Air Force.

=== Bronze Star citation (second award) ===
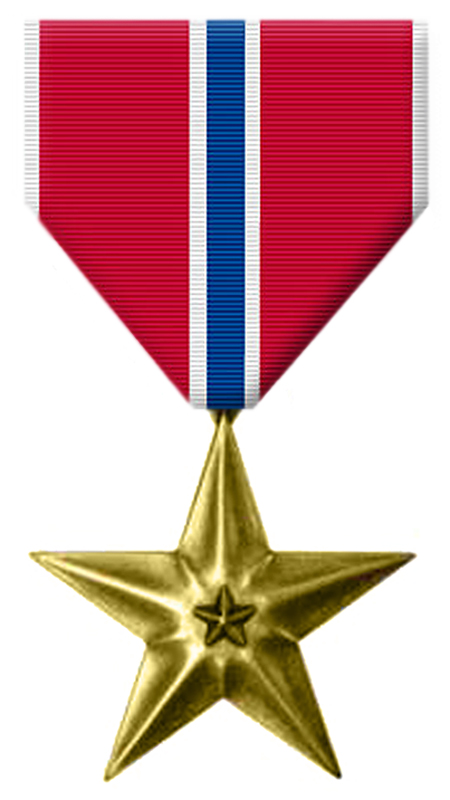

The President of the United States of America, authorized by Executive Order 11046, 24 August 1962, takes pleasure in presenting a Bronze Oak Leaf Cluster in lieu of a Second Award of the Bronze Star Medal with Combat "V" to Colonel Joseph William Kittinger, Jr. (AFSN: AO-190919/FR-52808/AD-14329714), United States Air Force, for heroic achievement as a Prisoner of War while engaged in operations against an opposing armed force in North Vietnam during the period 31 May 1972 to 28 March 1973. In an atmosphere of enemy harassment and brutal treatment, he continued to establish and maintain communications through unusual and ingenious methods, which resulted in American and Allied prisoners presenting a posture of increased resistance to the enemy’s wishes, and, at the same time, improving prisoner morale. By his heroic endeavors and devotion to duty under adverse conditions of his environment, he reflected great credit upon himself and upheld the highest traditions of the United States Air Force.

=== Bronze Star citation (third award) ===
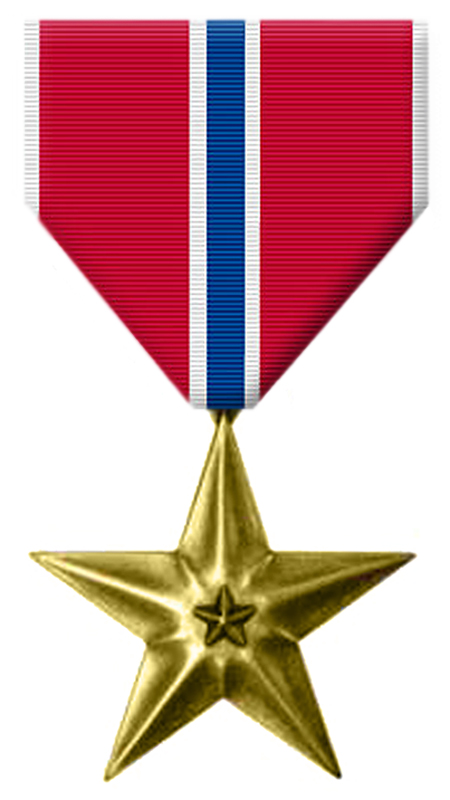

The President of the United States of America, authorized by Executive Order 11046, 24 August 1962, takes pleasure in presenting a Second Bronze Oak Leaf Cluster in lieu of a Third Award of the Bronze Star Medal with Combat "V" to Colonel Joseph William Kittinger, Jr. (AFSN: AO-190919/FR-52808/AD-14329714), United States Air Force, for heroic achievement while a Prisoner of War in North Vietnam from May 1972 to March 1973. His ceaseless efforts to conduct himself strictly in accord with the Code of Conduct and policies of the prisoner organization in the difficult conditions of a communist prison clearly demonstrated his loyalty, love of country, and professionalism. By his unselfish dedication to duty, he reflected great credit upon himself and the United States Air Force.

=== Prisoner of War Medal citation ===
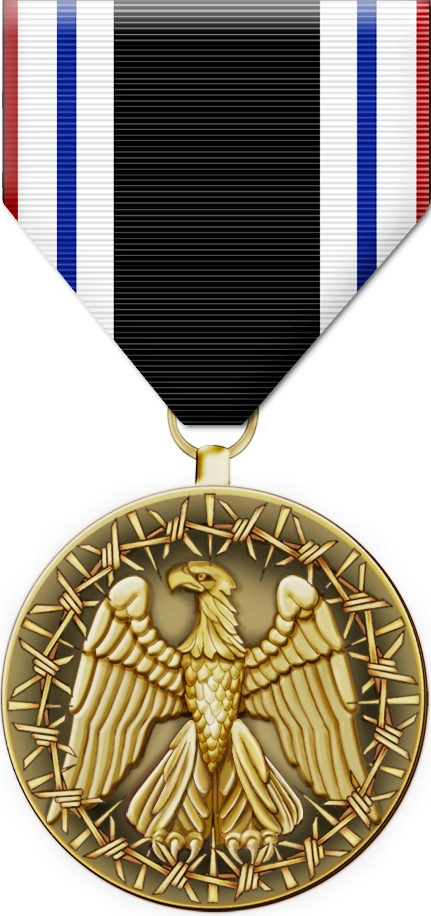

Colonel Joseph William Kittinger, Jr. (AFSN: AO-190919/FR-52808/AD-14329714), United States Air Force, was held as a Prisoner of War in North Vietnam from May 11, 1972 until his release on March 28, 1973.

== Later civilian career ==
Kittinger retired from the Air Force as a colonel in 1978 and initially went to work for Martin Marietta (now Lockheed Martin) Corporation in Orlando, Florida. He later became vice president of flight operations for Rosie O'Grady's Flying Circus, part of the Rosie O'Grady's/Church Street Station entertainment complex in Orlando, prior to the parent company's dissolution.

Still interested in ballooning, Kittinger set a world distance record for the AA-06 size class of gas balloons of 3,221.23 kilometers (2,001.58 mi) in 1983. The record has since been broken. In 1984, he completed the first solo balloon crossing of the Atlantic in the 106,000-cubic-foot (3,000 m^{3}) Balloon of Peace, launched from Caribou, Maine, on September 14 and landing on September 18. The flight was organized by the Canadian promoter Gaetan Croteau. An official FAI world aerospace record, the 5,703.03-kilometer (3,543.70 mi) flight is the longest gas balloon flight in the AA-10 size category. For the second time in his life, he was the subject of a story in National Geographic Magazine.

Kittinger participated in the Gordon Bennett Cup in ballooning in 1989 (ranked third) and 1994 (ranked 12th).

In the early 1990s, Kittinger helped NASA plan Charles "Nish" Bruce's project to break Kittinger's highest parachute jump record. The project was suspended in 1994.

Joining the Red Bull Stratos project, Kittinger advised Felix Baumgartner on Baumgartner's October 14, 2012, free-fall from 128,100 feet (39,000 m). The project collected leading experts in the fields of aeronautics, medicine, and engineering to ensure its success. Kittinger served as CAPCOM (capsule communicator) for Baumgartner's jump, which broke Kittinger's altitude record set during Project Excelsior.

In 2013, Kittinger helped balloonist Jonathan Trappe as he attempted to be the first to cross the Atlantic by cluster balloon.

== Legacy ==
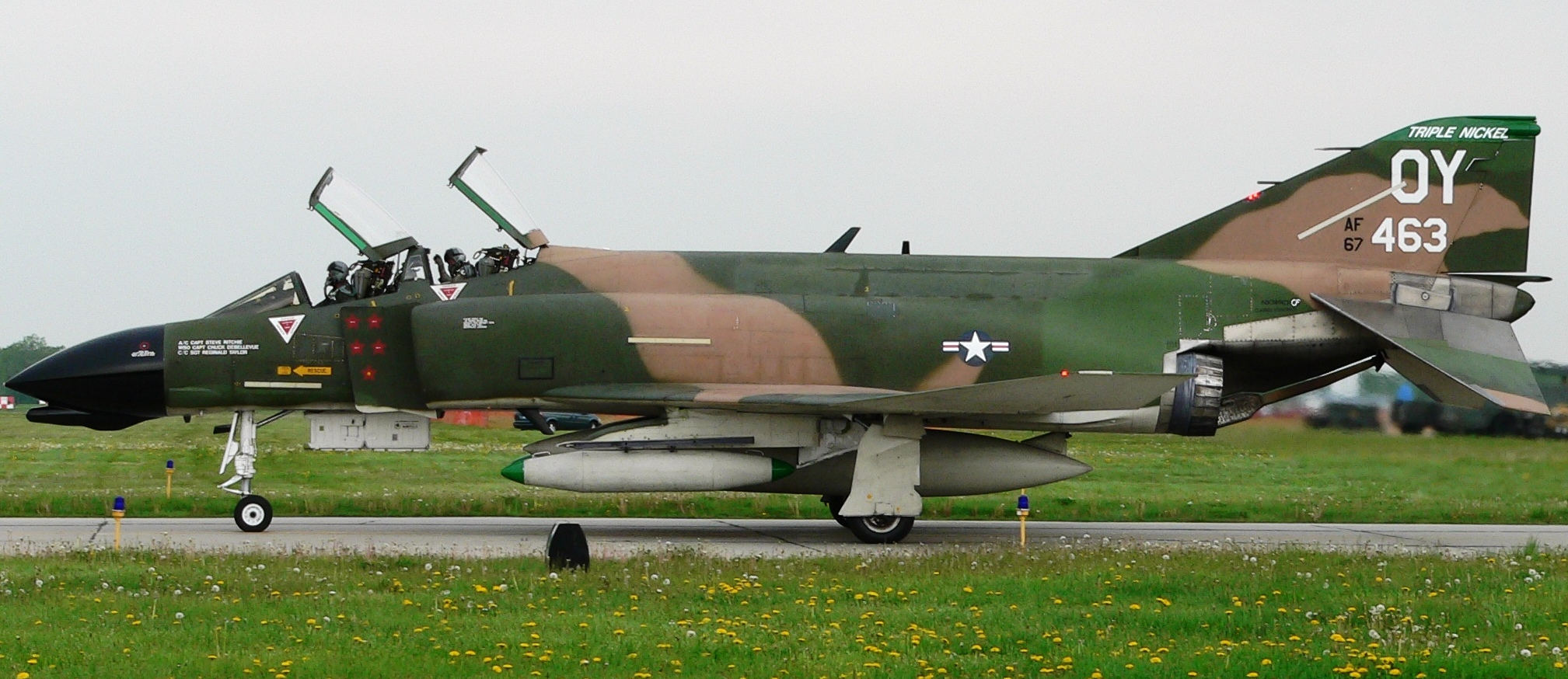
Collings Foundation F-4D Phantom II with markings & serial number of the F-4D that then-Lt Col Kittinger achieved his MiG-21 kill in while commanding the 555th Tactical Fighter Squadron. The actual F-4D, AF Ser. No. 66-7463, is now on permanent display at the USAF Academy.

In 1997, Kittinger was inducted into the National Aviation Hall of Fame in Dayton, Ohio.

On January 23, 2007, the Civil Air Patrol honored Kittinger by renaming the Texas CAP wing's TX-352 Squadron after him. Texas Governor Rick Perry cited Kittinger's work, as did the Texas state senate with a special resolution presented during the dedication ceremony attended by Kittinger and his wife, Sherry. The Colonel Joseph W. Kittinger Phantom Senior Squadron of CAP's Texas Wing is based at the former Bergstrom AFB, the site of Kittinger's last active duty assignment in the Air Force and which is now the Austin-Bergstrom International Airport.

Kittinger was honored at a 2009 ceremony in Caribou, Maine, the launch point for his 1984 solo trans-Atlantic balloon flight. He also served as the guest of honor at the community's sesquicentennial celebration.

On February 20, 2013, Kittinger visited his alma mater, the University of Florida, and spoke to over 400 students and faculty about his role in the Red Bull Stratos and Excelsior III.

The event took place during the UF Engineers Week, and it was made possible due to the efforts of the UF American Institute of Aeronautics and Astronautics, UF's Air Force ROTC Detachment 150, and the UF College of Engineering.

In November 2023, Kittinger was posthumously inducted into the Florida Veterans Hall of Fame in Tallahassee, Florida.

In April 2025, the U.S. Post Office in Casselberry, Florida was renamed the Colonel Joseph W. Kittinger II Post Office Building.

=== Colonel Joe Kittinger Park ===
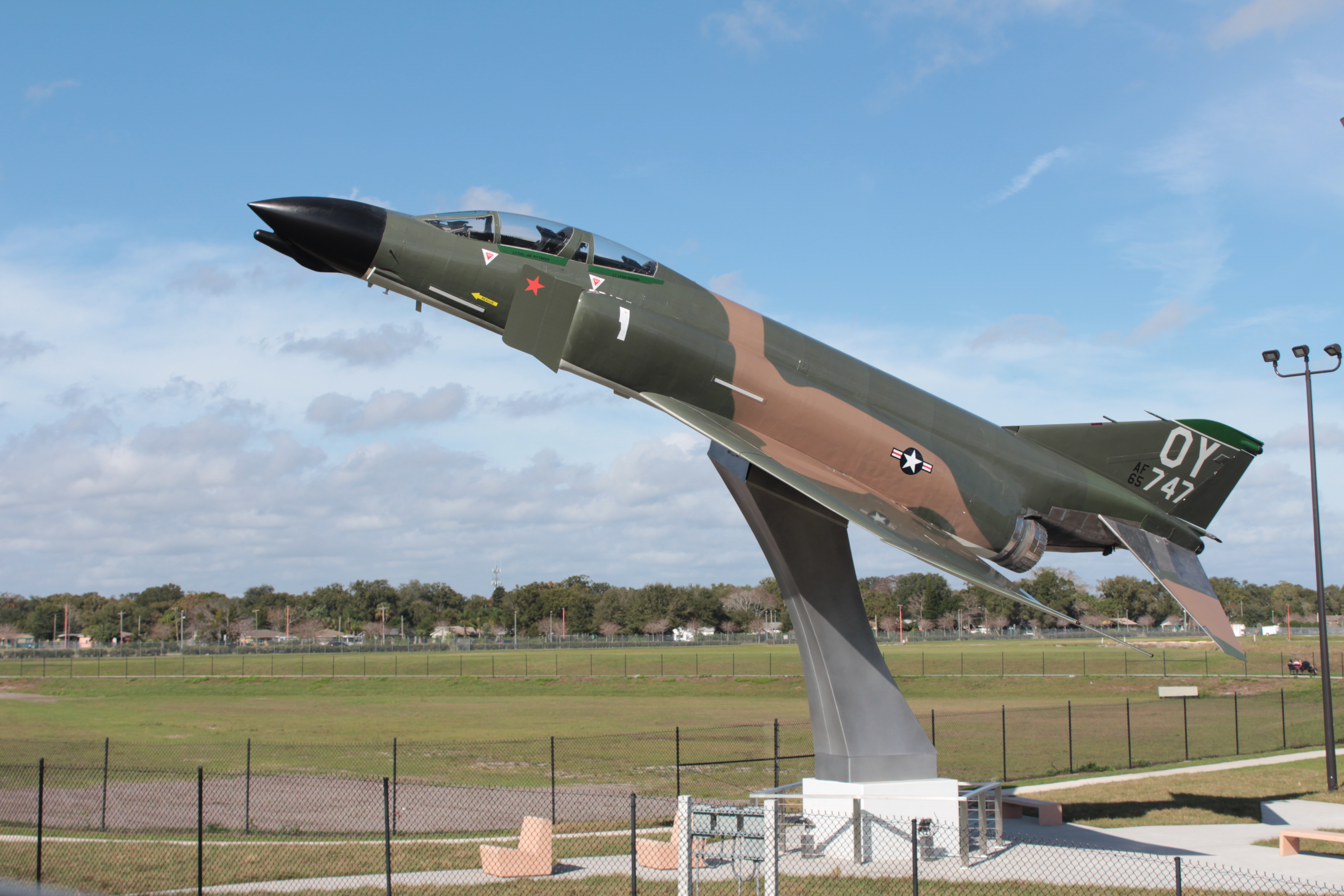
F-4D, AF Ser. No. 65-0747, on display at Colonel Joe Kittinger Park

In September 1992, Colonel Joe Kittinger Park in Orlando, Florida, was completed by the Greater Orlando Aviation Authority (GOAA) for the City of Orlando. Located on the southwest corner of the Orlando Executive Airport, at the corner of Crystal Lake Drive and South Street, the park was named in Kittinger's honor, but was temporarily closed and partially demolished circa 2008–2011 in order to create a stormwater runoff retention area to permit a highway expansion project of the State Road 408 East-West Expressway. In March 2011, the park was reopened at its previous location.

In spring 2014, the mayor of Orange County, the mayor of Orlando, the GOAA Board, and other City of Orlando and GOAA officials approved the installation in the park of a restored USAF F-4 Phantom II aircraft. The National Museum of the U.S. Air Force picked an F-4D previously on display in Corsicana, Texas (Air Force serial no. 65-0747) to be moved to Orlando for display. It was subsequently determined that Kittinger had flown this particular F-4D on several occasions when it was assigned to his fighter wing in Thailand during the Vietnam War, and later when it was assigned to his fighter wing in Great Britain. Disassembled in Texas and transported in two semi-trailers over several days, the aircraft arrived in Orlando on July 22, 2014. It was restored by a team of volunteers at Orlando Executive Airport and painted with the colors and markings of the squadron that Kittinger commanded during the Vietnam War. The restored aircraft was mounted on its pylon and formally dedicated on December 14, 2014.

== Personal life and death ==
Kittinger died at the age of 94 on December 9, 2022, from lung cancer, survived by his wife, two sons, four grandchildren and eight great-grandchildren. He is interred at Arlington National Cemetery.

== See also ==
- Parachuting

Records
Preceded by None	Highest space dive (23.287 km); November 16, 1959 – August 16, 1960	Succeeded by Joseph Kittinger
Preceded by Joseph Kittinger	Highest space dive (31.333 km); August 16, 1960 – October 14, 2012	Succeeded by Felix Baumgartner
