= STEM in 30 =

American science education program

- Genre: Science Education
- Starring: Beth Wilson, Marty Kelsey
- Country of origin: United States
- Original language: English
- No. of seasons: 9
- No. of episodes: 74

Production
- Producers: Jon Boyette, Paul Griffith
- Editors: Ryan Shank (2018-), Devon Eifel (2019-21)
- Camera setup: multi-camera
- Running time: 30 min.

Original release
- Network: NASA TV
- Release: 2014 – present

STEM in 30 is a non-commercial online science educational program for middle school students produced by the Smithsonian's National Air and Space Museum in Washington, D.C. The show is hosted by science-educators Marty Kelsey and Beth Wilson. The program is released on a monthly basis throughout the school year free through the museum's website, YouTube and social media as well as broadcast on NASA-TV. Each episode is typically a half hour and features special guests and different science, math, engineering or technology topics.

Since first broadcasting in 2014, the program has covered dozens of topics including the NASA's Apollo program, Tuskegee Airmen, astronaut training, the Wright brothers and the Orion program. While the program is often based in one of the two locations of the National Air and Space Museum, the show has also been filmed on location in New York City, Seattle, Boston, Detroit, Houston, in Hurricane Florence and on the aircraft carrier USS Dwight D. Eisenhower.

The first four seasons of the show were broadcast live with a student audience. With its fifth season, STEM in 30 has switched its format to a pre-taped show along with a "Mission Debrief" a week later featuring a topic expert. The "Mission Debrief" is a live question and answer session about that month's topic.

In 2019, the first episode of season five, "Robotics: FIRST There Were People, Then There Were Machines," was nominated for a National Capital / Chesapeake Bay Emmy Award for Technology Program. The program has since received five regional Emmy nominations in total.

As of 2025, it was rerun by Nashua ETV, part of Nashua Community Television, in Nashua, New Hampshire.

== List of episodes ==
Season 1 Episode List
Episode	Title	Special Guests
1.1	Vacuum Packed Space Food: It's What's for Dinner	Chef K
1.2	Kites to Flight: Inventing with the Wright Brothers	Tom D. Crouch
1.3	Lighter, Stronger, Better: Composites	Dan Hagedorn
1.4	Space Junk: Fast Trash	Dr. Cathy Lewis, Dr. Roger Thompson, Dr. Don Thomas, Dr. Andrew Johnston
1.5	Oh You're Just Full of Hot Air: Hot Air Balloons and Air Pressure	Tom D. Crouch, Vanessa Nagengast, Greta Glaser, Curt Westergard, Ron Broderick
1.6	WWI: How History Shaped Technology	Dr. Peter Jakob, Dan Taylor, Dorothy Cochrane, Christopher Moore
1.7	Earth Day: Earthrise and Photography from Space	Dr. Jennifer Levasseur, Dr. Martin Collins, Dr. Andrew K Johnston
1.8	Living and Working in Space	Dr. Piers Sellers, Paolo Nespoli, Dr. Jennifer Levasseur, Dr. Valerie Neal

Season 2 Episode List
Episode	Title	Special Guests
2.1	Time and Navigation	Rory McEvoy, Dr. Andrew K. Johnston, Roger Connor, Dr. Paul Ceruzzi
2.2	Asteroid Redirect Mission	Dr. Michele Gates, Lindley N. Johnson, Randy Bresnik, Bo Naasz
2.3	Mars	Dr. John Grant, Dr. Matthew Shindell, Dr. Marshall Porterfield, Dr. Mary Cleave, Paolo Nespoli
2.4	ISS: 15 Years of Continuous Human Presence	Dr. Cathy Lewis, Samantha Cristoforetti, Clay Anderson, Reid Wiseman, Terry Virts, Paolo Nespoli, Randy Bresnik
2.5	Wilbur and Orville Wright: The Process of Invention	Matt Anderson
2.6	Milestones of Flight: The Lindberghs	Dorothy Cochrane, Bob van der Linden, Malcolm Collum, Reeve Lindbergh
2.7	WWII and Tuskegee Airmen	Jeremy Kinney, Tom D. Crouch, Joe Murchison, Charles McGee
2.8	SR-71 Blackbird	Buz Carpenter, James David, Layne Karafantis, Stanley Seagle
2.9	Mars Rover	Jim Zimbelman, Kobie Boykins, Stanley Seagle
2.10	Kites	Tom D. Crouch, Amanda Malkin, Jon Burkhardt, James "Fletch" Fletcher, Dawn Hayworth, Scott Weider, Dave Ashworth, Paul LaMasters
2.11	Copters, Choppers and the Phrog: The Science of Vertical Flight	Roger Connor, Steve Bussman
2.12	Moon Rocks	Dr. Tom Watters, Pricilla Strain, Dr. Allan Needell, Lisa Young

Season 3 Episode List
Episode	Title	Special Guests
3.1	Star Trek at 50: Science Fiction to Science Fact	Margaret Weitekamp, Marc Okrand, Rod Roddenberry
3.2	A Sky Full of Color: Live from the Albuquerque Balloon Fiesta	Tom D. Crouch, Andy Richardson
3.3	Seven Minutes of Terror: The Engineering behind Landing on Other Planets	Ian Clark, Bill Siders, Paolo Nespoli, Timothy Kopra
3.4	Scientist or Guinea Pig: Science on Station	Anna Lee Fisher, Brett McNish, Stephanie Wilson, Kjell Lindgren, Michael Collins, Timothy Kopra
3.5	The Wright Stuff: Flying the Wright Flyer	Peter Jakab, Keith Yoerg, Tom D. Crouch, Anna Lee Fisher, Barrington Irving, Timothy Kopra, Kobie Boykins, Eric Fanning, Christina Koch, Kjell Lindgren
3.6	The Biology of Long Term Space Flight	Michael Barratt, Kjell Lindgren, Anna Lee Fisher
3.7	Taking the Fast Lane to Orbit: The Technology of Rockets and Racecars	Kurt Romberg, Kevin Schlesier, Jacob Wallace, Rick Davis, Warren Lipford
3.8	The Women who are Paving the Way to Mars	Abigail Harrison, Catherine Wiedman, Christina Koch, Anne McClain
3.9	World War I: Legacy, Letters, and Belgian War Lace	Dirk Wouters, Katrin Wouters, Peter Jakab, Karen Thompson, Lora Vogt, Paul Broadhurst, Juliete Broadhurst, Alice Blom, Louis Blom

Season 4 Episode List
Episode	Title	Special Guests
4.1	Solar Eclipse Special: Live From the Path of Totality	Ivanka Trump, Gary Lezak, Shauna Edson, Staci Lester, Geneviéve de Messiéres
4.2	Building a Better Mousetrap and Inventing the Airplane: All About Patents	Elizabeth Dougherty, Dr. Magaret Weitekamp, Tom D. Crouch, Dr. Cathly Lewis, RJ Batts
4.3	Live Downlink with the International Space Station & Astronaut Randy "Komrade" Bresnik	Randy Bresnik
4.4	We Choose to Go to the Moon...	Michael Collins, Julie Kramer White, Daniel Newmyer, Dr. Jennifer Levasseur, Dr. Cathy Lewis, Allan Needell, Vincent Rossi, Brian Matthews
4.5	Landing a Really Fast Plane on a Really Big Boat	CDR Chris Browne, Capt. Paul C. Spedero Jr., Capt. Sterling Gilliam, Lt. Joe Ash, CDR Ray Stromberger
4.6	The Psychology of Long Term Space Flight: Music, Art, and Creature Comforts	Randy Bresnik, Samantha Cristoforetti, Dr. Jennifer Levasseur, Kjell Lindgren, Dr. James Picano, Beth Turner, Reid Wiseman
4.7	Meet Orion and SLS: America's Next Great Spacecraft	Shane Kimbrough, Jack Fischer, Travis Fitzgerald, Danielle Richey, Keith Yoerg
4.8	The Airplane's Family Tree: From the Wright Brothers to Today	Randy Bresnik, Nick Borer, Peter Jakab, Captain Kyle Whitaker, Julie Callers, Phil Marasigan, Wally Coates, Patti Erickson, Ryan Dominguez, Christine Hanna
4.9	Astronaut Training	Kjell Lindgren, Joe Acaba, Michael Barratt, Anna Lee Fisher, Travis Fitzgerald, Victor Glover, Shane Kimbrough, Christina Koch, Timothy Kopra, Kate Rubins, Jeff Williams
4.10	Staying Safe is No Accident: The Science of Safety	Maggy Benson, Carla Dove, Jane Foster, Beth McHugh, Erik Mueller, Don Kramer, Marie Moler
4.11	The Engineering Behind a Record-Breaking Skydive	Tom D. Crouch, Alan Eustace, Jared Leidich, Dr. Cathy Lewis
4.12	Ask an Astronaut with Randy Bresnik and Paolo Nespoli	Randy Bresnik, Paolo Nespoli
4.13	How Do We Know What's Out There?	Geneviéve de Messiéres, Shauna Edson
4.14	Live Downlink with the International Space Station & Serena Auñón-Chancellor	Serena Auñón-Chancellor, Deanne Bell, Ansel Austin, Austin Suder, Jason Qin, Niki Werkheiser, Jason Crusan, Joe Acaba

Season 5 Episode List
Episode	Title	Episode Synopsis	Special Guests	Mission Debrief Expert
5.1	Robotics: FIRST There Were People, Then There Were Machines	Beth and Marty invite local FIRST teams to show off their robotic skills, while they learn about the different FIRST competitions and the different robots that reside at the museum.	Dean Kamen, Frank Merrick	Paul Ceruzzi, Centreville Robotics, CascadesThunderbots
5.2	What Goes Up Must Come Down: Plummeting Through the Layers of the Atmosphere	Beth, Marty and a group of middle school students learn about the different layers of the atmosphere by looking at Alan Eustace's world-record-setting skydive and a weather balloon. They find out why the earth has layers and how that's related to weather.	Alan Eustace, Jared Leidich, Chris Strong	Anne Douglass
5.3	World War One: How the Great War Still Influences Today	A group of middle schoolers travel back in time to learn about what caused the Great War and what life was like on the home front. Marty and Beth join them for a look at the Sopwith Camel, one of the most important airplanes from the war.	Patty Wagstaff, Dr. Peter Jakab	Dr. Peter Jakab
5.4	Magic or Math? Math in the Aerospace Industry	Marty decides to quit the show to become a magician, the show gets a special message from the Houston Texans and a group of middle-schoolers race the Wright Flyer.	Toro, Peggy Whitson, Joe Acaba, Corey Williams	Dr. David DeVorkin, Dr. Geneviève de Messières
5.5	STEM in Real Life	Beth and Marty celebrate their 50th episode by taking a look back at all the guests and segments of the show. They also look at the different ways science, technology, engineering and mathematics have been used on the show for real life situations.	Marc Okrand, Kate Rubins, Jared Leidich, Aaron Parness, Dean Kamen, Curt Westergard, Dr. Michael Nickens (Doc Nix), Jon Burkhardt, Tom D. Crouch, Amanda Malkin Andy Richardson, Kjell Lindgren, Frederick D. Gregory, Randy "Komrade" Bresnik, Scott Tingle, Paolo Nespoli, Peggy Whitson, Shaesta Waiz, Samantha Cristoforetti, Reid Wiseman, Stephanie Wilson, Dr. Peter Jakab, Rod Roddenberry, Ivanka Trump, Shauna Edson, Michael Collins, Dr. Cathy Lewis, Shane Kimbrough Tim Kopra, Alan Eustace, Walter Cunningham, Michael Barratt, Buz Carpenter	Lisa Pitts
5.6	Your Ticket to Space: Commercial Spaceflight	Marty and Beth travel to a middle school to conduct some experiments that they haven't been allowed to do in the museum, while explaining the difference between the NASA space program and other commercial space programs. The National Air and Space Museum and Virgin Galactic celebrate the launch of the commercial spaceship SpaceShip Two.	Tom Lassman, Scott Tingle, Celena Dopart, Dr. Michael Neufeld, Dr. Ellen Stofan, Sir Richard Branson, Dr. Valerie Neal, Mike Moses, Karin Nildotter, Byron Henning, Mark Stucky, Harrison Ford, Victor Glover	Tom Lassman
5.7	Rock Me Like a Hurricane: The Science of Earth's Largest Storms	Marty travels with the hurricane hunters through the eye of Hurricane Florence. To better understand the type of data that was collected, he and Beth travel to New York City to talk with ABC News Chief Meteorologist Ginger Zee. They also talk to the chief scientist of the JUNO mission to Jupiter about hurricanes on other planets.	Ginger Zee, Shauna Edson, 1st Lt. Garrett Black, Hoot Gibson, Scott Bolton	Jason Samenow
5.8	Reboot the Suit: Neil Armstrong's Spacesuit	Marty and Beth surprise a group of middle-schoolers with being able to visit the National Air and Space Museum's conservation lab and see the spacesuit Neil Armstrong wore on the Moon. The students are taught about how important conservation is to the museum and how conservationists protect the collection.	Cathy Lewis, Lisa Young, Michael Collins, Jennifer Lavasseur, Alvin Drew	Cathy Lewis
5.9	Voyage to the Moon: 50 Years Ago and Today	Coming up on the 50th anniversary of the Apollo 11 Moon landing, Beth and Marty travel to Seattle to see the Command Module Columbia that took Neil, Buzz and Michael to the Moon and back. Marty visits the Baltimore Ravens' practice field to find out how to hit moving targets and a group of middle schoolers face off against professional soccer players from Reign FC in gravity games.	Ted Heutter, Gene Kranz, Geoff Nunn, Michael Collins, Robert Griffin III, Willie Snead IV, Tim Dee, Megan Oyster, Darian Jenkins, Poppy Northcutt	Christine Darden, Margot Lee Shetterly

Season 6 Episode List
Episode	Title	Episode Synopsis	Special Guests	Mission Debrief Expert
6.1	Top of the Tower: How Air Traffic Control Keeps the Skies Safe	Beth learns about what information Air Traffic Controllers are giving to pilots, while Marty tags along with middle school students as they learn how to fly airplanes. They both learn how weather impacts Air Traffic and what was the hardest day to be an Air Traffic Controller.	Abby Welch, Shakari Stroud, Mike Spleidel, Jamaal Teel, Chayanne Hyde, Arielle Clark, Ginger Zee, Michelle Salcedo	Chris Browne
6.2	Fly Girls: Women in Aerospace	The first private women space explorer, Anousheh Ansari, stops by the museum as Beth and Marty take the opportunity to learn about all the inspiring women in the aerospace field over the years including Amelia Earhart, Ruth Law, Bessie Coleman, Anne Morrow Lindbergh, Poppy Northcutt, Sally Ride, and others. Anousheh also helps Beth, Marty and a group of middle-schoolers as they try to build painting robots.	Ellen Stofan, Anousheh Ansari, Poppy Northcutt, Tam O'Shaughnessy, Michelle Curran, Dottie Metcalf-Lindenburger, Shauna Edson, Diane Kidd, Margaret Weitekamp, Emily Martin, Hana Kim	Astronaut Abby
6.3	Apollo 12: The Shocking Story	Beth and Marty explore the Virginia Air and Space Center to learn about the Apollo 12 mission. They learn from a middle school science teacher why the Saturn V appeared to be struck by lightning when it lifted off the launch pad. Nancy Conrad gives them background on the all Navy crew of Pete Conrad, Alan Bean and Dick Gordon. They learn why Apollo 12 was considered a pinpoint landing and how the new Orion capsule is similar to the capsule used on the Apollo missions.	Robert R. Griesmer, George Conway, Raji Ganguli, Nancy Conrad, Jim Pouchot, Alan Keller, Clancy Hatleberg	Nancy Conrad
6.4	Solving Complex Problems with Simple Machines	Marty takes Beth to a 19th-century working gristmill and meet with a group of kids. While there they find out about all the simple machines that go into the operation of a grist mill and compare that to the use of simple machines at the National Air and Space Museum.	Kathryn Blackwell, Stephen Golobic, Chris Redderson, Stephanie Stewart, Kristen Horning, Brian Kerr	Megan Schaller
6.5	Buzz the Tower: How Bees Influence Aviation	TBA	Holly Walker, Seán Brady, Hartmut Doebel, Farhana Alam, Imad Atallah, Allison Cameron, Camille Leopni, Fiona Lupi-Peate, Jean DeStefano	Holly Walker, Imad Atallah
6.6	Spy Planes: Eyes in the Sky	Beth receives intelligence from a mysterious source and it's the Junior Agents of STEM's job to find out if it's reliable. To help them along the way Beth and Marty visit CIA Headquarters to learn about the art of intelligence gathering. The Junior Agents of STEM meet back up with them at the International Spy Museum to find out who Beth's source was.	Robert Byer, Brent Geary, David Robarge, Vince Houghton, Major Kris, Ryan Shank, Devon Eifel, Michael Collins	Walter Watson
6.7	Diamonds in the Sky: Stars and Exoplanets	A group of students visit the Steven F. Udvar-Hazy Center are approached by a mysterious woman who offers them a chance to visit other planets.	Shauna Edson, Barb Gruber, Paul Griffith, Scott Bolton, Carly Solis, Devon Eifel, Harold Geller, Mary Jimenez, Natasha Latouf, Peter Plavchan, Michael Summers, James Trefil, Justin Wittrock	Luke Sollitt
6.8	World War II: Victory in Europe	Celebrating the 75th anniversary of VE Day, Marty and Beth take a look at the European theater of the Second World War with the help of Tuskegee Airman Charles McGee and National World War II Museum in New Orleans, Louisiana. Beth and Marty then meet up with student reporter, Jaden Jefferson, to interview a veteran and offers tips on how the audience can do the same.	Charles McGee, Seth Paridon, Jaden Jefferson, Alvin Drew, Bella Townsend, Kate Danno, Michael Collins	Seth Paridon, Kate Fitzgerald
6.9	Shake Rattle and Roll: The Science Underneath Earthquakes and Volcanoes	Beth and Marty travel the Pacific Northwest for the 40th anniversary of the 1980 Mount St. Helens Eruption. They visit the USGS Cascades Volcano Observatory to learn more about different kind of volcanos and how they can impact airplanes. Marty and Beth compare earthquakes to the data collection of marsquakes with the InSight Lander. Beth takes a reluctant Marty to the top of the Space Needle in Seattle to explain how structures are built to withstand different geological forces.	Alexa Van Eaton, Dottie Metcalf-Lindenburger, Eric Forsman, Michael Collins	Ed Venzke, Janine Krippner

Season 7 Episode List
Episode	Title	Special Guests	Live Chat
7.1	Victory in Japan, and the End of WWII	Donald Stratton, Scott Tingle, George Haines, Geraldine 'Geri' Nyman	Katherine Sharp Landdeck
7.2	Pushing the Envelope: The Art and Science of Ballooning	Tom Crouch, Alan Eustace, Jared Leidich, Bill Costen, Vanessa Nagengast, Greta Glaser, Andy Richardson, Ginger Zee, Zebras	Bill Costen
7.3	At Home In Space: The International Space Station at 20	John Herrington, Drew Feustel, Shane Kimbrough, Scott Tingle, Nick Hague, Anne McClain, Serena Auñón-Chancellor, David Wolf, Ryan Shank, Mark Vande Hei, Joe Acaba, Victor Glover, Michael Barratt	Kjell Lundgren
7.4	The Need for Speed: TOPGUN and Naval Aviation!	Alfred Taddeo, Chris Browne, Jason Hwang, Robert Curbeam, Joe "Pound" Ash, Victor Glover, Matt Baumgardt	Blue Angels
7.5	Communication is Key: National History Day 2021	Gene Kranz, Bill Costen, Robert Griffin III, Darian Jenkins, Craig Laughlin, Megan Oyster, Tom Crouch, John Herrington, Elizabeth Borja, Margot Lee Shetterly, Jennifer Levasseur, Ginger Zee, Kevin Lamparter, Paul Griffith, Lexi Danielson, Lexi Simms, Quentin Basnaw, Ryan Shank, Devon Eifel	Jennifer Levasseur, Teasel Muir-Harmony, James David, Peter Jakab, Heather Wilson
7.6	Perseverance, What it Takes to Explore the Red Planet	Courtney Peckham, Shannon Baldioli, Katie Stack Morgan, Matthew Golombek, Jaden Jefferson, Alex Mather, Mariah Baker, John Grant	Abigail Harrison
7.7	Shhhhh. The Science of Stealth	Chris Kratt, David Robarge, Dean Kamen, Walter Watson, Jeff Duford	Tim Sutton, Kristen Wolfe
7.8	Space Shuttle at 40	Michael Barratt, Alvin Drew, Anna Fisher, Tam O’Shaughnessy, Jennifer Levasseur, David Wolf, John Herrington, Paul Richards, Michael Good, Ray-J Johnson, Megan McArthur, John Grunsfeld, Drew Feustel, Joe Acaba, Ricky Arnold, Dottie Metcalf-Lindenberger, Julie Kramer White	Amy Foster, Emily Margolis
7.9	What do you want to be when you grow up? Careers in Aerospace	Ginger Zee, Kjell Lindgren, Anne McClain, Peter Plavchan, Mary Jimenez, Natasha Latouf, Alvin Drew, Ryan Shank, Quentin Basnaw, Lexi Simms, Lexi Danielson, Maj. Michelle Curran, Kate Rubins, Julie Kramer White, Michael Good, Ryan Dahm, Serena Auñón-Chancellor, Danielle Richey, Dean Kamen, Jeff Williams, Jared Leidich, Scott Tingle, Gene Kranz, Michael "Doc Nix" Nickens, David Wolf, Capt. Ray "Gator" Stromberger, Poppy Northcutt, Robert Griffen III, Alan Eustace, Ariel Tweto, Victor Glover, Maj. Jason Markzon, Anna Fisher, Anousheh Ansari, Dottie Metcalf-Lindenburger	Kelly Johnson, Andre Gore, DeMarco Best

Season 8 Episodes
Episode	Title	Special Guests
8.1	At Home Astronomy: How You Can Observe the Night Sky	Julian "Zeus" McClurkin, Darnell "Speedy" Artis, Max Bawarski, Becca Lundgren, Samantha Thompson, Michael Summers, James Trefil, Scott Bolton
8.2	Mail Away, Mail Away, Mail Away	Daniel Piazza, Lynn Heidelbaugh, Bob van der Linden
8.3	Remote Sensing and how it impacts YOUR life	Tim Walsh, Brendon Rubin-Oster, Melissa Wagner
8.4	Birds, Bats, Bugs and Brothers: Animals Pave the Way for Human Flight	Chris Kratt

== Awards ==
Year	Nominee / work	Award	Result
2016	15 Years on the ISS	Telly Award	Won
2019	Robotics: FIRST There Were People, Then There Were Machines	National Capital / Chesapeake Bay Emmy Award - Technology Program	Nominated
2020	Top of the Tower: How Air Traffic Control Keeps the Skies Safe	National Capital / Chesapeake Bay Emmy Award - Education/Schools - Program/Special	Nominated
2020	A Flight with the 53rd Weather Reconnaissance Squadron, the Hurricane Hunters	National Capital / Chesapeake Bay Emmy Award - Weather - Program/Special	Nominated
2021	Get Excited About the Creepy Crawly Stuff! The GW Buzz	National Capital / Chesapeake Bay Emmy Award - Education/Schools - Short Form Content	Nominated
2021	Spy Planes: Eyes in the Sky	National Capital / Chesapeake Bay Emmy Award - Informational/Instructional - Long Form Content	Nominated
