= Alan Eustace =

American computer scientist (born 1956)

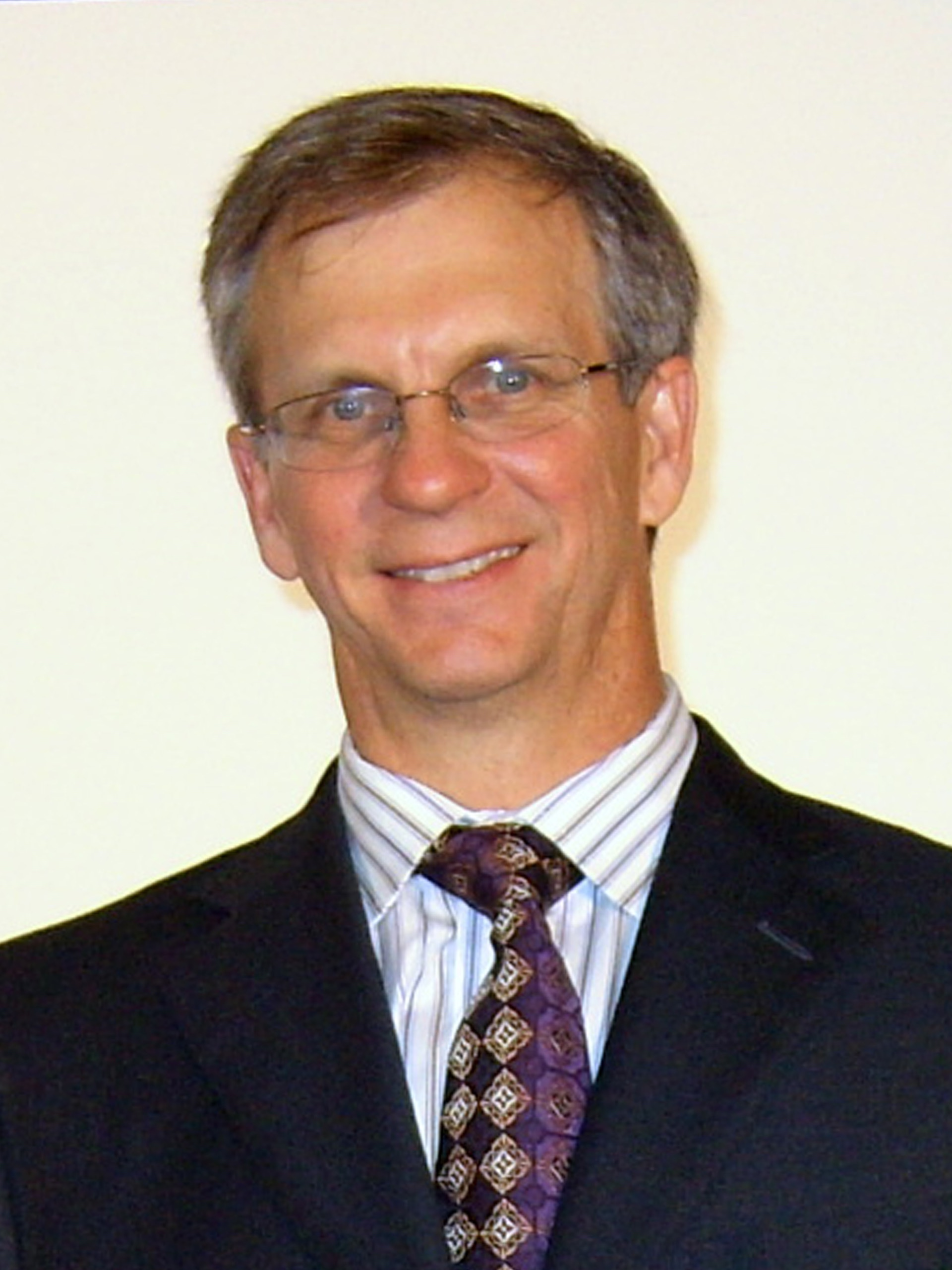
- Eustace in 2008
- Born: Robert Alan Eustace; December 19, 1956 (age 69)
- Education: University of Central Florida
- Occupation: Computer scientist
- Known for: World record for the highest-altitude free-fall jump
- Board member of: Anita Borg Institute for Women and Technology

Robert Alan Eustace (born December 19, 1956) is an American computer scientist who served as senior vice president of engineering and first senior vice president for knowledge at Google until retiring in 2015. On October 24, 2014, he made a free-fall space dive from the stratosphere, breaking Felix Baumgartner's world record. The jump was from 135,890 feet (41.42 km), an altitude record that stands as of 2026. His freefall lasted 4 minutes 27 seconds, with a further 10 minutes under parachute. He won the Laureus World Action Sportsperson of the Year in 2015.

== Early years ==
The son of a Martin Marietta engineer, Eustace grew up in Pine Hills, Florida, then a working-class suburb of Orlando, where small ranch houses had been built for employees of the Martin Marietta Corporation. After graduating from Maynard Evans High School in 1974, he received a debate scholarship from Valencia College and attended it for a year before transferring to Florida Technological University—now known as the University of Central Florida—to major in mechanical engineering.

As a university student, Eustace worked part-time selling popcorn and ice cream in Fantasyland and working on the monorail at Walt Disney World. After taking a class on computer science, he decided to switch majors and ended up completing three academic degrees in the field, including a doctorate in 1984.

== Professional career ==
After graduation, Eustace worked briefly for Silicon Solutions, a startup in Silicon Valley, before joining Digital, Compaq and then HP's Western Research Laboratory, where he worked 15 years on pocket computing, chip multi-processors, power and energy management, internet performance, and frequency and voltage scaling. In the mid-1990s, he worked with Amitabh Srivastava on ATOM, a binary-code instrumentation system that forms the basis for a wide variety of program analysis and computer architecture analysis tools. These tools had a profound influence on the EV5, EV6 and EV7 chip designs.

Eustace was appointed head of the laboratory in 1999, but left it three years later to join Google, then a new startup. At Google, he worked as Senior Vice President of Engineering until he retired from that section of Google on March 27, 2015.

As of 2025, Eustace is board chair of Pivotal, sometimes giving interviews about their electric VTOL aircraft, the Pivotal BlackFly.

In the course of his professional career, Eustace co-authored nine publications and appeared as co-inventor in 10 patents.

== Stratosphere jump ==
Comparisons: Jump altitudes by Alan Eustace and others versus atmospheric temperature and pressure

In 2011, Eustace decided to pursue a stratosphere jump and met with Taber MacCallum, one of the founding members of Biosphere 2, to begin preparations for the project. Over the next three years, the Paragon Space Development technical team designed and redesigned many of the components of his parachute and life-support system. The Paragon team integrated systems for the Stratospheric Explorer mission code named StratEx Space Dive.

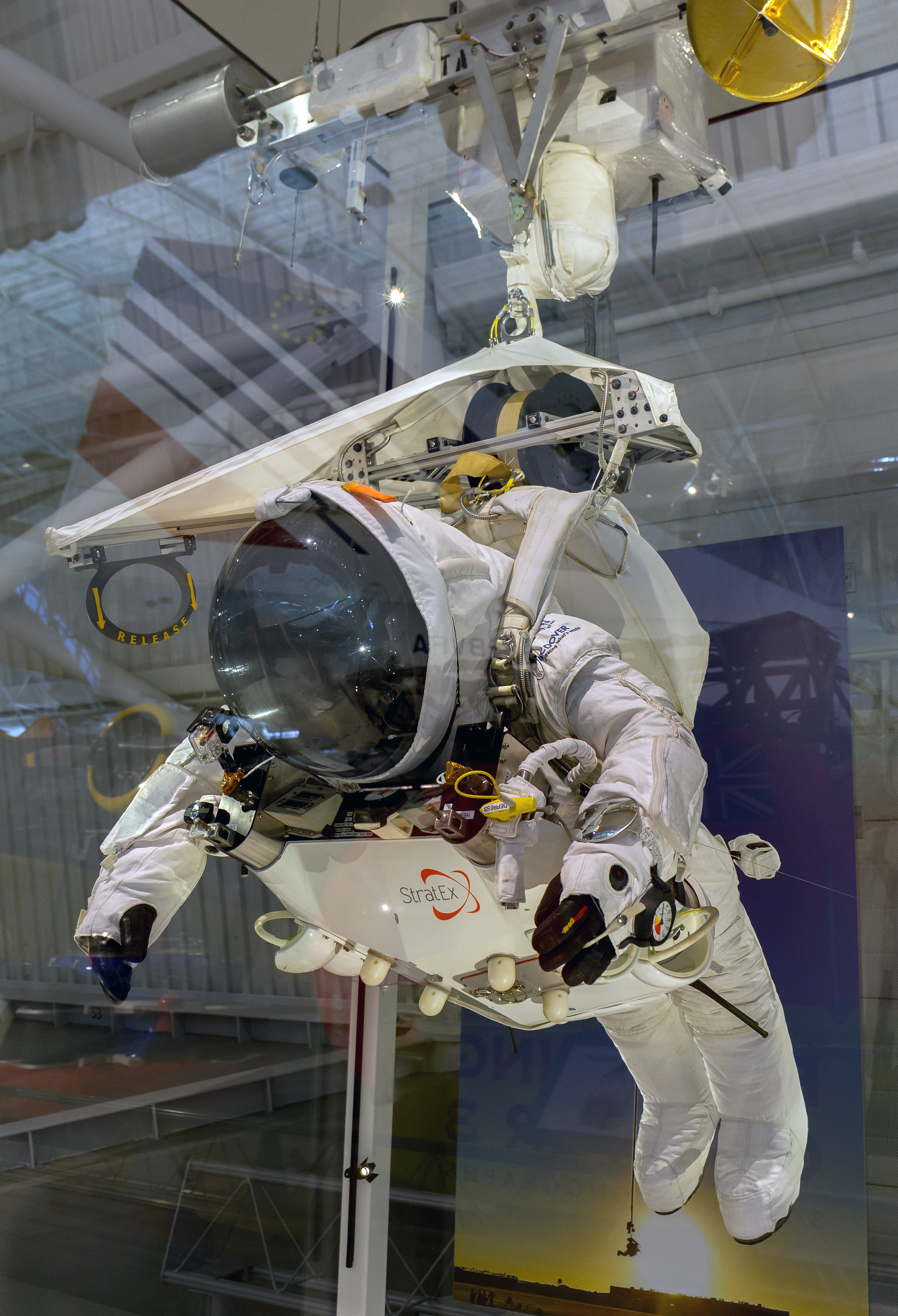
Eustace's suit on display at the Udvar-Hazy Center

On October 24, 2014, Eustace made a jump from the stratosphere, breaking Felix Baumgartner's 2012 world record. The launch-point for his jump was an abandoned runway in Roswell, New Mexico, where he began his gas balloon-powered ascent early that morning. He reached a reported maximum altitude of 135,908 feet (41.425 km; 25.7402 mi), but the final number submitted to the World Air Sports Federation was 135,889.108 feet (41.419000 km; 25.7365735 mi). The balloon used for the feat was manufactured by the National Balloon Facility of Tata Institute of Fundamental Research at Hyderabad, India. Eustace in his pressure suit, built by ILC Dover, hung tethered under the balloon, without the kind of capsule used by Felix Baumgartner. Eustace started his fall by using an explosive device to separate from the helium balloon.

His descent to Earth lasted 4 minutes and 27 seconds and stretched nearly 26 miles (42 km) with peak speeds exceeding 822 miles per hour (1,323 km/h), setting new world records for the highest free-fall jump and total free-fall distance 123,414 feet (37.617 km; 23.3739 mi). However, because Eustace's jump involved a drogue parachute, while Baumgartner's did not, their vertical speed and free-fall distance records remain in different categories.

Unlike Baumgartner, Eustace, a twin-engine jet pilot, was not widely known as a daredevil prior to his jump.

Eustace's world record jump was featured in two episodes of STEM in 30, a television show geared towards middle-school students by the National Air and Space Museum.

Records
Preceded by (Austria) Felix Baumgartner	Highest space dive (41.419 km); October 24, 2014 – present	Current holder
