= StratEx Space Dive =

On October 24, 2014, Alan Eustace broke the world record for the highest balloon flight and skydive of all time, releasing himself from a balloon at 135,908 feet.

Comparisons: Jump altitudes by Alan Eustace and others versus atmospheric temperature and pressure

== Details ==
In 2011, Eustace decided to pursue a stratosphere jump and met with Taber MacCallum, one of the founding members of Biosphere 2, to begin preparations for the project. Over the next three years, the Paragon Space Development technical team designed and redesigned many of the components of his parachute and life-support system. The Paragon team integrated systems for the Stratospheric Explorer mission code named StratEx Space Dive.

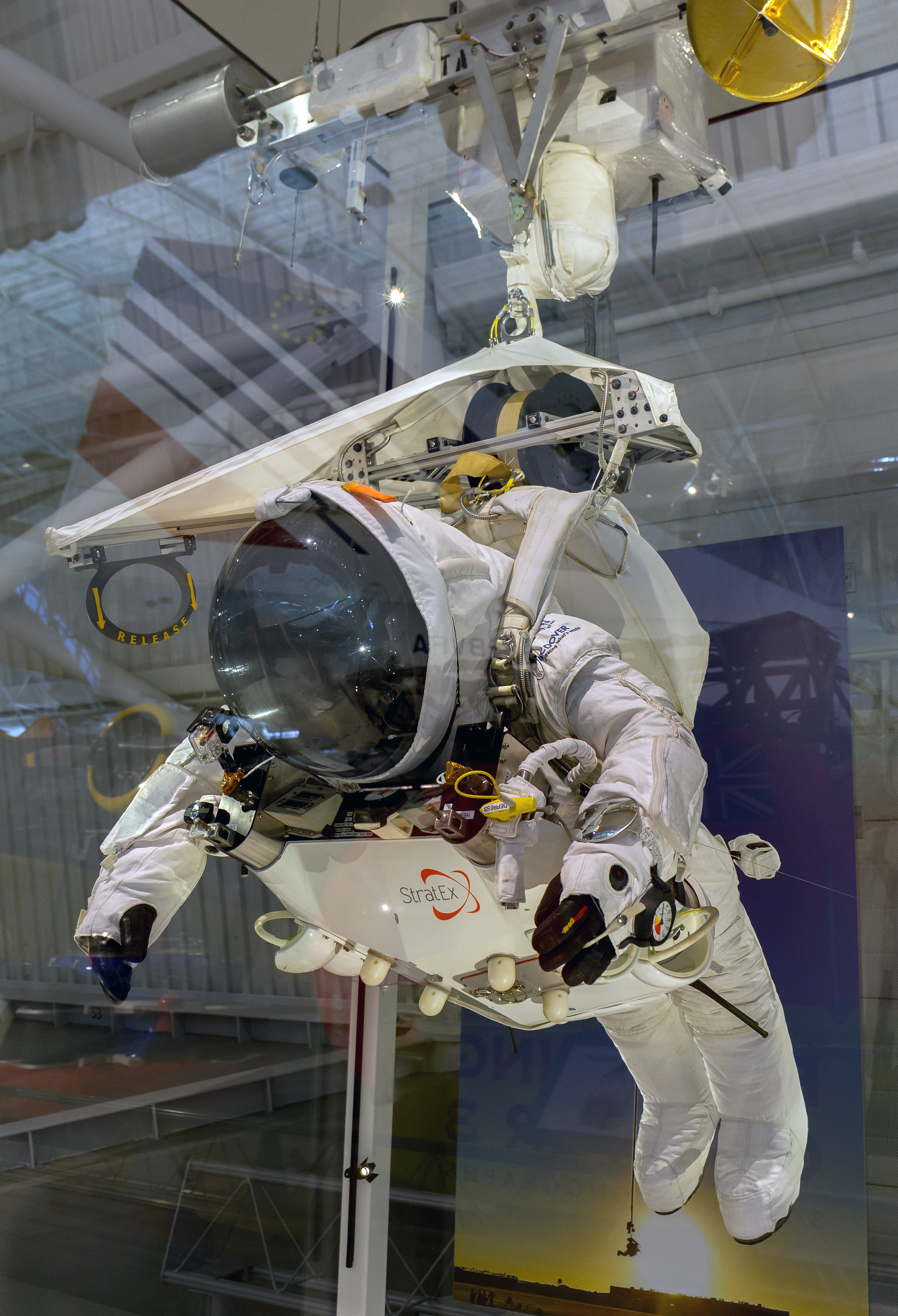
Eustace's suit on display at the Udvar-Hazy Center

On October 24, 2014, Eustace made a jump from the stratosphere, breaking Felix Baumgartner's 2012 world record. The launch-point for his jump was from an abandoned runway in Roswell, New Mexico, where he began his gas balloon-powered ascent early that morning. He reached a reported maximum altitude of 135,908 feet (41.425 km; 25.7402 mi), but the final number submitted to the World Air Sports Federation was 135,889.108 feet (41.419000 km; 25.7365735 mi). The balloon used for the feat was a zero-pressure balloon manufactured by the Balloon Facility of the Tata Institute of Fundamental Research, Hyderabad, India. Eustace in his pressure suit hung tethered under the balloon, without the kind of capsule used by Felix Baumgartner. Eustace started his fall by using an explosive device to separate from the helium balloon.

His descent to Earth lasted 4 minutes and 27 seconds and stretched nearly 26 miles (42 km) with peak speeds exceeding 822 miles per hour (1,323 km/h), setting new world records for the highest free-fall jump and total free-fall distance 123,414 feet (37.617 km; 23.3739 mi). However, because Eustace's jump involved a drogue parachute, while Baumgartner's did not, their vertical speed and free-fall distance records remain in different categories.

Unlike Baumgartner, Eustace, a twin-engine jet pilot, was not widely known as a daredevil prior to his jump.

Eustace's world record jump was featured in two episodes of STEM in 30, a television show geared towards middle-school students by the National Air and Space Museum.
