= Scott Bolton =

Scott Bolton may refer to:

- Scott Bolton (rugby league) (born 1987), Australian rugby league footballer
- Scott Bolton (American football) (born 1965), American football wide receiver
- Scott J. Bolton (born 1958), American theoretical and experimental space physicist
