= Krippner =

Krippner is a surname. Notable people with the surname include:

- Janine Krippner, physical volcanologist from New Zealand
- Martin Krippner (1817–1894), Bohemian-born Austrian settler of New Zealand
- Ronny Krippner, German-born British organist, conductor, teacher, and composer
- Stanley Krippner (born 1932), American psychologist and parapsychologist
