= Dorothy Metcalf-Lindenburger =

American astronaut (born 1975)

Dottie Metcalf-Lindenburger
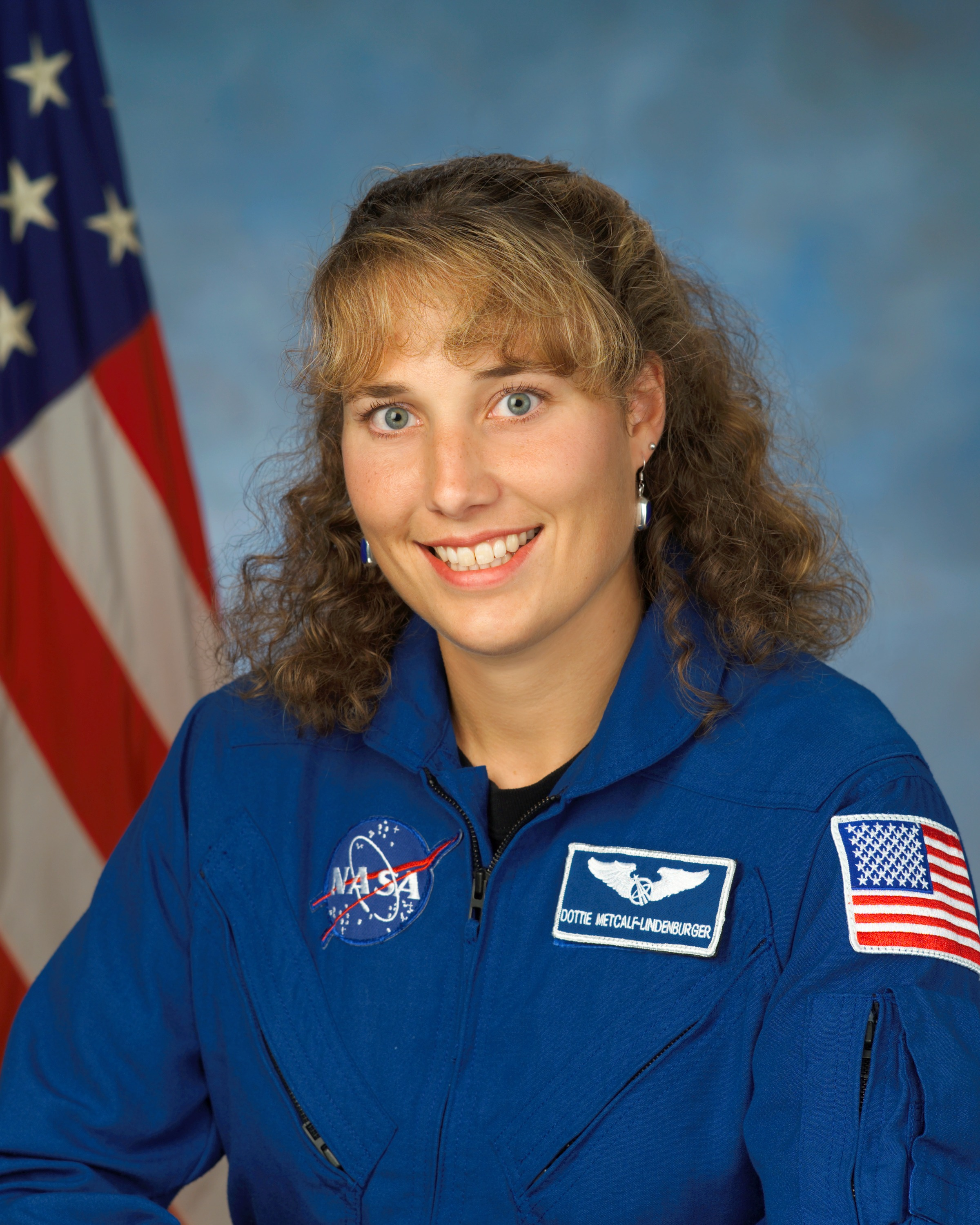
- Born: Dorothy Marie Metcalf; May 2, 1975 (age 51); Colorado Springs, Colorado, U.S.
- Education: Whitman College (BS); University of Washington (MS)
- Spouse: Jason Lindenburger (m. 2000)
- Children: 1
- Space career

NASA astronaut
- Time in space: 15d 2h 47m
- Selection: NASA Group 19 (2004)
- Missions: STS-131
- Retired: June 13, 2014

Dorothy Marie "Dottie" Metcalf-Lindenburger (born May 2, 1975) is a retired American astronaut. She was a science teacher at Hudson's Bay High School in Vancouver, Washington when she was selected in 2004 as an educator mission specialist. She was the first Space Camp alumna to become an astronaut.

== Early life and career ==
Dorothy Metcalf was born in Colorado Springs, Colorado to Joyce and Keith Metcalf.

Metcalf graduated from Fort Collins High School, Fort Collins, Colorado. She went on to attend Whitman College in Walla Walla, Washington, where she studied geology. As an undergrad, she undertook research with the KECK Consortium for two summers. In 1995, she worked in Wyoming mapping the last glaciations of Russell Creek, and in 1996 she mapped and determined the petrology of the rocks in the Wet Mountain region of Colorado. She graduated from Whitman College in 1997.

She received her teaching certification at Central Washington University, Ellensburg, Washington in 1999. Metcalf spent five years teaching earth science and astronomy at Hudson's Bay High School in Vancouver, Washington. She spent three years coaching cross-country at the high school level, and two years coaching Science Olympiad.

In 2000, she married Jason Lindenburger, a fellow Whitman College graduate and educator, from Pendleton, Oregon. They have one daughter together.

In 2016, Metcalf-Lindenburger earned her master's degree in geology from the University of Washington.

She is a member of the organizations International Order of the Rainbow for Girls, Phi Beta Kappa, the National Education Association, and The Mars Generation.

== Honors ==
- 2007 Space Camp Hall of Fame Inaugural Inductee
- 1999 Outstanding Teacher Preparation Candidate at Central Washington University.
- 1997 Whitman College Leed's Geology Award
- 1997 Whitman College Order of the Waiilatpu
- 1996 GSA Field Camp Award
- 1995–1996 NAIA Academic All-American in Cross Country and Track
- 1996 NAIA Conference Champion in the 10K.

== NASA career ==
Metcalf-Lindenburger was selected by NASA in May 2004 as an astronaut candidate. Astronaut candidate training includes orientation briefings and tours, numerous scientific and technical briefings, intensive instruction in Shuttle and International Space Station systems, physiological training, T-38 flight training, and water and wilderness survival training. Successful completion of this training in February 2006 qualified her as a NASA Astronaut. She served as a mission specialist on STS-131, an April 2010 Space Shuttle mission to the International Space Station. The mission's primary payload was the Multi-Purpose Logistics Module Leonardo, which was filled with food and science supplies for the station. The MPLM also carried the third and final Minus Eighty Degree Laboratory Freezer for ISS (MELFI), Window Orbital Research Facility (WORF), one Crew Quarters Rack, the Muscle Atrophy Resistive Exercise (MARES) rack, Resupply Stowage Racks (RSRs), and Resupply Stowage Platforms (RSPs).

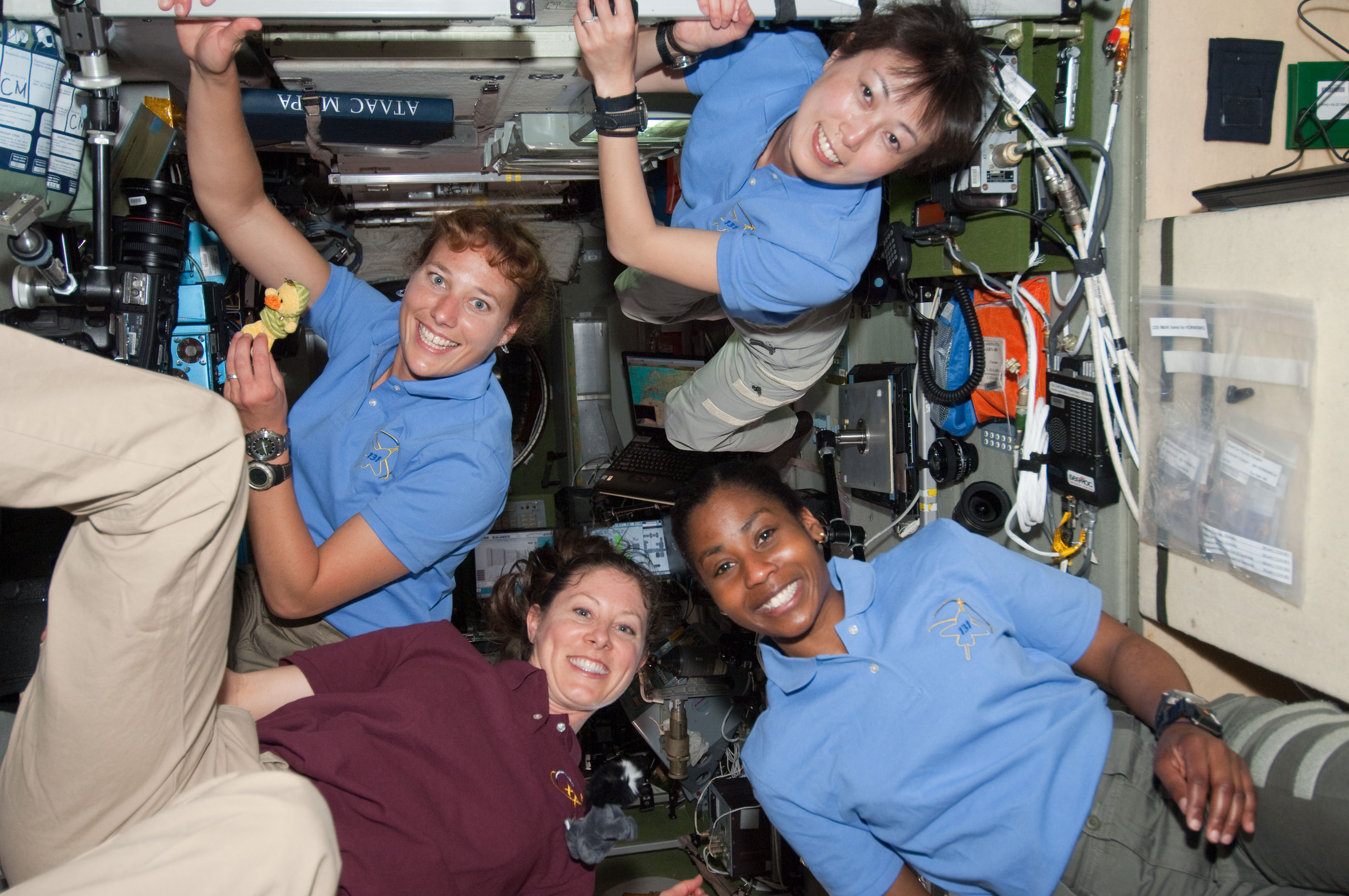
The three astronauts of STS-131 (Metcalf-Lindenburger on the top left) and Tracy Caldwell of ISS Expedition 23, the first time four women were in space at the same time.

On July 20, 2009, Metcalf-Lindenburger sang the national anthem at the Houston Astros game against the St. Louis Cardinals in celebration of the 40th anniversary of the Apollo 11 Moon landing. She has been a long-time lead singer with the all-astronaut rock band, "Max Q".

On April 16, 2012, NASA announced that Metcalf-Lindenburger would command the NEEMO 16 undersea exploration mission aboard the Aquarius underwater laboratory, scheduled to begin on June 11, 2012, and last twelve days. The NEEMO 16 crew successfully "splashed down" at 11:05 am on June 11. On the morning of June 12, Metcalf-Lindenburger and her crewmates officially became aquanauts, having spent over 24 hours underwater. The crew safely returned to the surface on June 22.

Metcalf-Lindenburger retired from NASA on June 13, 2014, to live and work in the Seattle area.

=== Spaceflights ===
STS-131 Discovery (April 5 to 20, 2010), a resupply mission to the International Space Station, was launched at night from the Kennedy Space Center, Florida. On arrival at the station, Discovery's crew dropped off more than 27,000 pounds of hardware, supplies and equipment, including a tank full of ammonia coolant that required three spacewalks to hook up, new crew sleeping quarters and three experiment racks. On the return journey, Leonardo, the Multi-Purpose Logistics Module (MPLM) inside Discovery's payload bay, was packed with more than 6,000 pounds of hardware, science results and trash. The STS-131 mission was accomplished in 15 days, 2 hours, 47 minutes and 10 seconds and traveled 6,232,235 statute miles in 238 Earth orbits.
