= Jenni Barclay =

Professor of volcanology

- Education: University of Edinburgh; University of Bristol
- Known for: Volcanology
- Scientific career
- Workplaces: University of Bristol; University of East Anglia; University of California, Berkeley; University of Geneva; Montserrat Volcano Observatory

Professor Jenni Barclay is the AXA Chair in Volcanology at the University of Bristol. She works on ways to mitigate volcanic risks, the interactions between rainfall and volcanic activity and the communication of volcanic hazards in the Caribbean. Barclay leads the NERC-ESRC funded Strengthening Resilience to Volcanic Hazards (STREVA) research project as well as a Leverhulme Trust programme looking at the volcanic history of the Ascension Islands.

== Early life and education ==
Barclay became interested in the natural environment as a child, particularly volcanoes, tsunamis and avalanches. She enjoyed watching scientists from the Climatic Research Unit on BBC Horizon. Barclay studied geology at the University of Edinburgh. She moved to Bristol for her doctoral degree, and studied degassing processes in silicic volcanoes. During her postdoctoral fellowships she investigated magma storage in the Soufrière Hills volcano, an eruption which began on 18 July 1995. She identified that the Soufrière Hills magma contained amphibole, quartz, plagioclase, pyroxene, magnetite and ilmenite at pressures of 115 to 130 Megapascals. She worked at the University of California, Berkeley and University of Geneva, as well as serving as a duty scientist at the Montserrat Volcano Observatory.

== Research and career ==
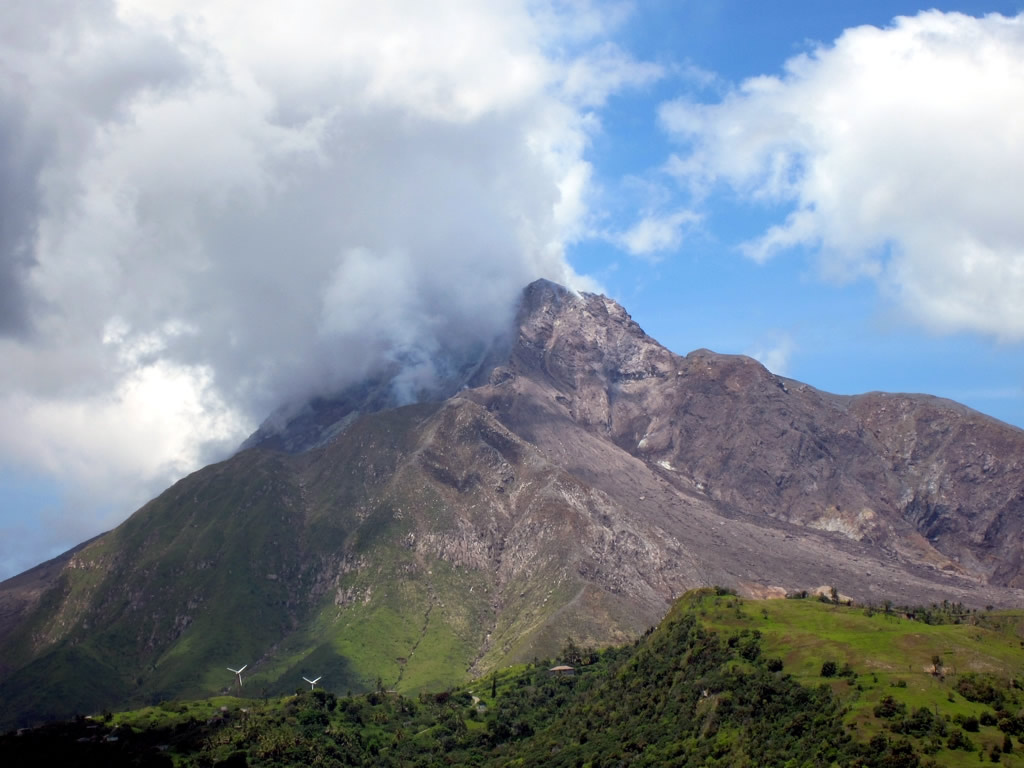
The Soufrière Hills volcano that Barclay has extensively studied.

In 1999 Barclay was appointed to the University of East Anglia, moving to University of Bristol in 2024 to take up a position as the AXA Chair of Volcanology. Her research combines geological investigations into the dynamic processes of volcanoes with analysis of the social and cultural landscapes in which they erupt in. She served as Principal Investigator on Strengthening Resilience to Volcanic Hazards (STREVA), looking to develop a practical volcanic risk assessment framework, which was supported by the Natural Environment Research Council and Economic and Social Research Council. During STREVA Barclay worked with people from Saint Vincent and the Grenadines to document the historical and culture record of the 1902 and 1979 La Soufrière eruptions. As part of the programme, the researchers worked with the University of the West Indies to create a portable exhibit that toured the Caribbean. She combined historical archives, field measurements and meteorological modelling to reconstruct the La Soufrière eruptions. This allowed her to understand how the wind flow around volcanoes controls the movement of ash plumes through the atmosphere, depositing ash both close to the volcano and far away. In her work with communities in Ecuador Barclay showed that volcanic risk can be improved with collaborative monitoring. This work has inspired her latest project, Tomorrow's Cities, which looks at urban disaster risk in cities including Quito. Barclay has argued that the deaths that occur due to pulses of gas and solids after a volcano are avoidable.

=== Public engagement ===
Alongside her research, Barclay is committed to outreach and public engagement. She focuses on communicating the relationships between the hazards and surface topographies; for example, the difficult situations that arise when land that is important to communities becomes too dangerous as a place to live. STREVA resulted in a series of films that gave a voice to affected communities. In 2011 Barclay worked with Top Trumps to create a volcano themed version of the game. To create the game, Barclay consulted her colleagues to rank the thirty volcanoes for their explosiveness and deadliness. Barclay used the funds raised from Volcano Top Trumps to fund annual competitions to help people affected by volcanoes. They helped children in Ecuador make a book about volcano legends, the sales of which raised more money for the local community. She has created websites to communicate the relationship between hazards and landscape. She has appeared on the BBC, as well as speaking at Pint of Science, the Norwich Science Festival and the Natural History Museum. Barclay is a member of the editorial committee of the Diamond open access journal Volcanica.

=== Awards and recognition ===
2022 - Reginald Daly Lecture of the American Geophysical Union. This is presented 'annually to a recipient who exemplifies Daly's work with outstanding contributions to volcanology, geochemistry, or petrology.'

2015 - UK Volcanic and Magmatic Studies Group of the Geological Society of London, Thermo-Fisher Award, awarded annually to an individual who 'has made a significant contribution to our .. understanding of volcanic and magmatic processes'.

=== Selected publications ===
Her publications include;

- Haynes, Katharine; Barclay, Jenni; Pidgeon, Nick (20 May 2008). "Whose reality counts? Factors affecting the perception of volcanic risk". Journal of Volcanology and Geothermal Research. 172 (3): 259. Bibcode:2008JVGR..172..259H. doi:10.1016/j.jvolgeores.2007.12.012.
- Oppenheimer, Clive; Pyle, David M.; Barclay, Jenni (2003). "Volcanic degassing". Geological Society of London. ISBN 9781862391369.
- Barclay, Jenni; Rutherford, Malcolm J.; Sparks, RSJ (15 September 1998). "Experimental phase equilibria constraints on pre‐eruptive storage conditions of the Soufrière Hills magma" (PDF). Geophysical Research Letters. 25 (18): 3437–3440. Bibcode:1998GeoRL..25.3437B. doi:10.1029/98GL00856.

== Personal life ==
Barclay is married with two children.
