= Volcanica =

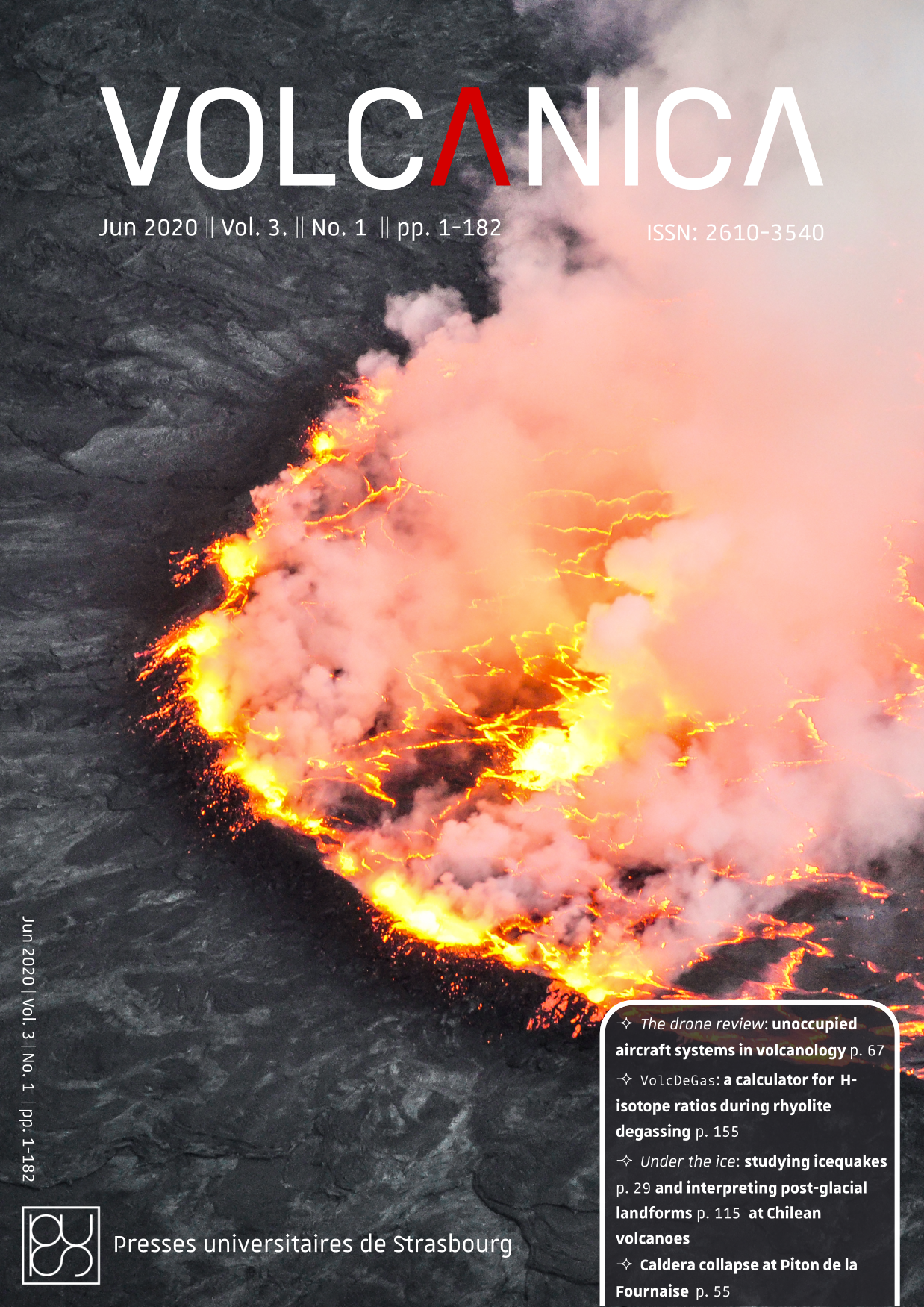
- Discipline: Earth sciences, volcanology
- Language: English
- Edited by: Jamie Farquharson

Publication details
- History: 2018–present
- Publisher: Volcanica (France)
- Frequency: Biannual, rolling publication
- Open access: Diamond Open Access
- License: CC-BY 4.0
- Impact factor: 2.1 (2025)

Standard abbreviations
- ISO 4: Volcanica

Indexing
- ISSN: 2610-3540
- OCLC no.: 1060571594

Links
- Journal homepage; Online access

Volcanica is a peer-reviewed open-access academic journal publishing original research on volcanoes and volcanology, including volcanic products, eruptive behaviour, volcanic hazards, societal impact of volcanoes, and pertinent research from other related disciplines. The journal operates in a Diamond open access model: free for both authors and readers. The costs associated with article processing are instead covered by Presses universitaires de Strasbourg (PUS), a French academic publishing house based in Strasbourg. The journal platform is based on Open Journal Systems open source software (itself developed by the Public Knowledge Project). The journal has been awarded a DOAJ Seal, demonstrating its commitment to best practice in open access publishing. The journal is a member of the Free Journal Network and the Open Access Scholarly Publishing Association.

Since 2018, Volcanica has achieved 'level 1' as a recommendable and relevant journal from the perspective of the Norwegian academic system. In 2024, the Finnish Publication Forum added it to its list of acceptable journals to publish in.

Volcanica's grassroots, diamond open access model has been cited as an inspiration for new and prospective open access initiatives across the Earth sciences, including seismology, sedimentology, and geochemistry.

== Abstracting and indexing ==
This journal is abstracted and indexed in:

- GeoRef
- GEOBASE
- Scopus
- Emerging Sources Citation Index

== Editorial board and committee ==
Volcanica consists of a team of volunteers in various editorial, technical, and outreach roles. As of November 2024, there are around forty editors. Notable past and present editors include Jenni Barclay, Kayla Iacovino, and Janine Krippner.
