= Kobie Boykins =

NASA affiliated American mechanical engineer

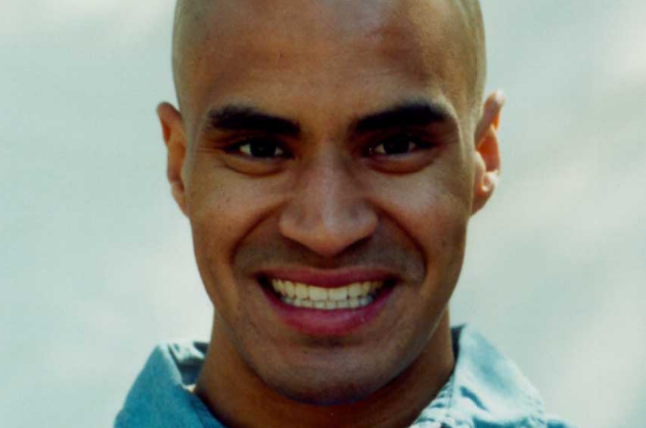
NASA Mechanical Engineer Kobie Boykins

Kobie Boykins is a senior mechanical engineer at NASA's Jet Propulsion Laboratory in Pasadena, California. In 2013, he was awarded the NASA Exceptional Achievement Medal. He designed the solar array systems for the Mars exploration rovers Spirit and Opportunity, and designed the actuators on the Mars rover Curiosity. He is currently the supervisor of the mobility and remote sensing teams for Curiosity. In 2003, he was part of NASA's M-Team, which lectured nationally to students regarding careers in science, technology, engineering, and mathematics. He lectures internationally for National Geographic regarding exploration on Mars.

== Personal life ==
Boykins attended Omaha Northwest High School and lived in Nebraska until college. Boykins then moved to New York to attend college, at B.S Mechanical Engineering Rensselaer Polytechnic Institute. After Graduation Boykins chose to take a position at Jet Propulsion Laboratory (JPL) and started working on projects with his selected team. Boykins was offered this opportunity while still studying at R.P.I. After arriving at JPL, Boykins meet Hannah Kim. Boykins and Kim got married and have two children. Boykins loves playing hockey and tries to play the game at least once a week.

== Career ==
After leaving R.P.I Boykins became a mechanical engineer at NASA's Jet Propulsion Laboratory in Pasadena, California. He worked with his team to design the solar array systems for the Mars Exploration Rovers Spirit and Opportunity, and designed the actuators for the Curiosity rover. This system generates power so the rover can operate while on Mars. Two rechargeable batteries are held inside the Mars Exploration Rover; these batteries are power sources for the rover when the sun is not shining. The rover can generate about 140 watts of power when fully illuminated and need about 100 watts for motion. The solar array system is attached to the rover and looks almost like wings, although they cannot be used for flight they are crucial for the system to function properly.

The Mars rover landed on January 25, 2004 which was only supposed to last approximately 90 days but the rover system is still online and adventuring mars to this day. Boykins then had the opportunity to design the actuators on the Mars rover Curiosity. The system is attached to the updated Mars Rover and is used for many research activities. He also is currently the supervisor of the mobility and remote sensing teams for Curiosity. has also been involved in other projects like, projects like Mars Pathfinder mission and the Ocean Surface Topography Mission. In 2024, Boykins worked on NASA's Europa Clipper mission which studied the surface ice of Jupiter's Europa moon.

== Awards ==
Boykins' achievements all start in 2002. This is when Boykins joined "Marsapalooza", which is a public education tour hoping to raise awareness of the Mars Exploration Project. The project visited 5 different cities across the country and presented himself as a role model to inspire the next generation of explorers. In 2003, he was part of NASA's M-Team, which lectured nationally to students regarding careers in science, technology, engineering, and mathematics. He lectures internationally for National Geographic regarding exploration on Mars. Boykins then joined another teaching program called the JASONProject Expedition; "Mysteries of Earth and Mars". Boykins joined the team in 2006, lecturing to students and teachers worldwide showing his knowledge in his field. In 2013, he was awarded the NASA Exceptional Achievement Medal.
