= Window Observational Research Facility =

Experiment rack facility manufactured by the Brazilian Space Agency

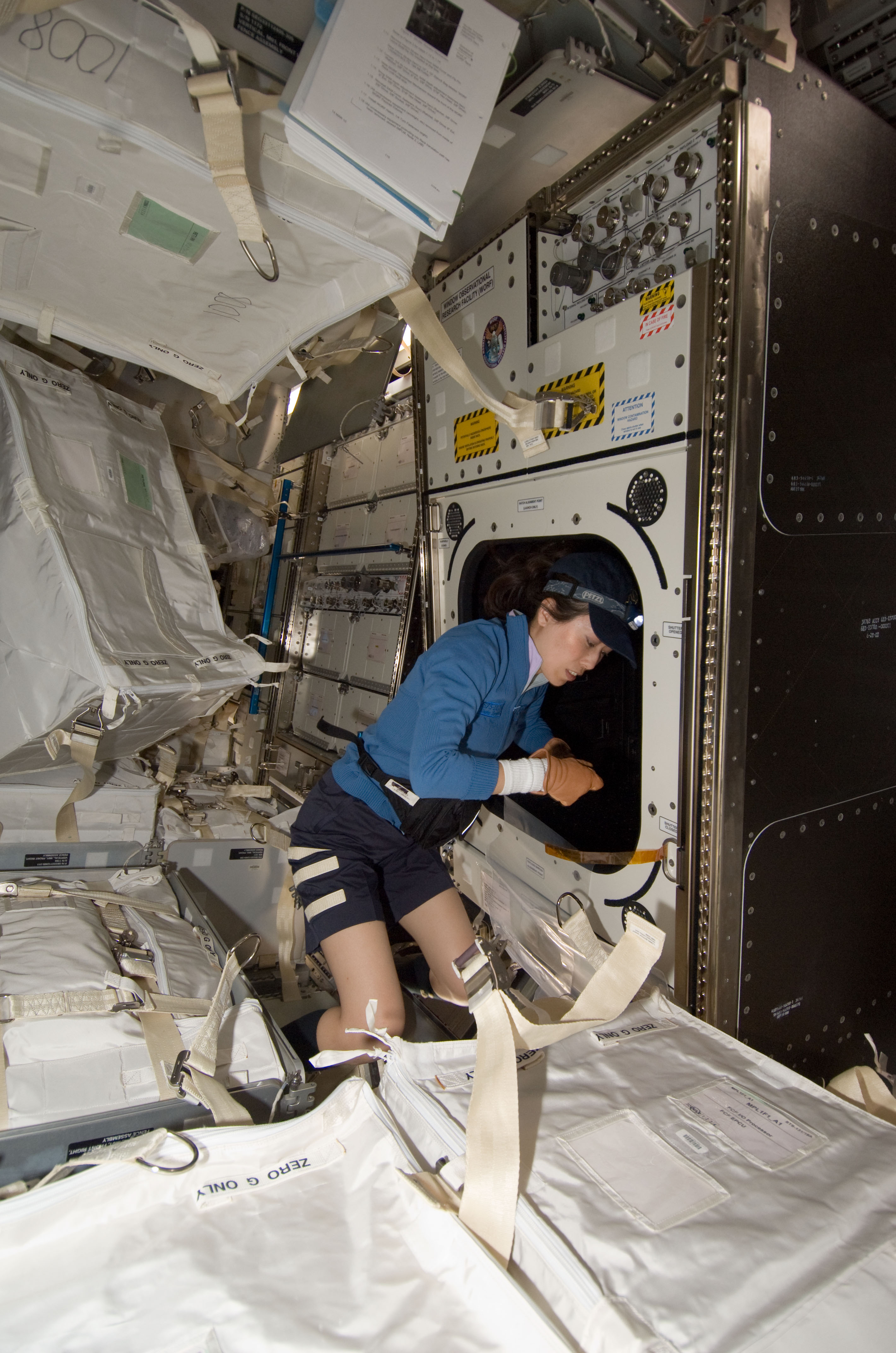
Japanese astronaut Naoko Yamazaki installs WORF in Destiny

The Window Observational Research Facility (WORF) is an experiment rack facility manufactured by the Brazilian Space Agency, which remotely operated payloads and crew members can perform Earth and space science research, including hand held photography, at the U.S. Laboratory Science Window on the International Space Station. WORF is based on an International Standard Payload Rack (ISPR) and utilizes avionics and hardware adapted from the EXPRESS Rack program. The rack provides a payload volume equivalent to 0.8 m^{3} (28 cu ft), and will be able to support up to three payloads simultaneously, depending on available resources and space available at the window. The WORF will also provide access and equipment for crew Earth observations, such as crew restraints, camera/camcorder brackets, and condensation prevention. WORF payloads include those focusing on geology, agriculture, ranching, environmental and coastal changes, and education.

The WORF design uses existing EXpedite the PRocessing of Experiments to Space Station (EXPRESS) Rack hardware which includes a Rack Interface Controller (RIC) box for power and data connection, Avionics Air Assembly (AAA) fan for air circulation within the rack, rack fire detection, and appropriate avionics to communicate with the ISS data network. The WORF will maximize the use of this window by providing sensors (cameras, multi-spectral and hyper-spectral scanners, camcorders and other instruments) to capture imagery of the Earth and space.

WORF also provides attachment points for power and data transfer and the capability for multiple instruments to be mounted and used in the window simultaneously. WORF will include a means of preventing the formation of condensation on the interior surface of the window and a retractable bump shield to protect the interior window surface from impacts of loose tools and hardware being used in the area during the set-up and change-out of sensor packages by the crew. The interior of the WORF provides a non-reflective, light-tight environment to minimize stray reflections and glare off the window allowing use to equipment that are sensitive to extremely low energy phenomena such as auroras. An opaque fabric shroud can be attached to the front of the rack to allow crew-members to work in the WORF without the problem of glare from the U.S. Laboratory interior lights.

When the WORF is not in use, when visiting spacecraft are docking with the International Space Station (ISS), or when the window is exposed to orbital ram conditions during special orientations of the ISS, the research lab window is protected by a metal cover on the outside of the Destiny lab module. This external window shutter pivots on hinges and is rotated open and closed by the crew using controls on the WORF rack.

== Delivery ==
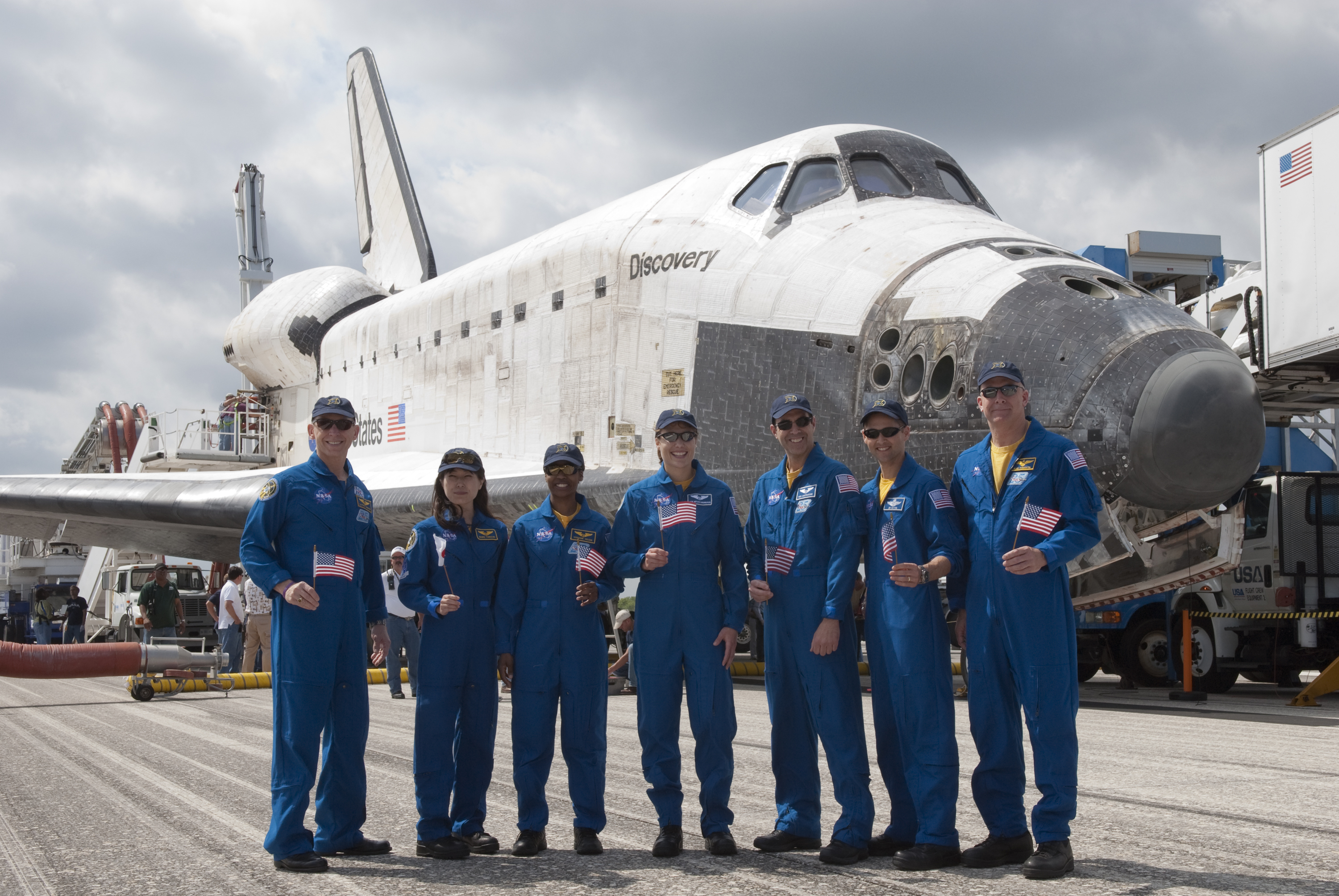
The Shuttle crew that delivered WORF to ISS poses for a crew photo after their successful mission to space

WORF was delivered by ISS Flight 19A (STS-131) . It was launched on April 5, 2010, aboard the NASA Space Shuttle.

== Operations ==
After transfer into the US Lab, WORF will be installed in the LAB1D3 location over the Destiny Window. The installation process includes attaching light close-outs, removing launch fasteners, connecting to U.S. Laboratory resources and installing mounting brackets.

After installation, WORF will be powered on by crew/ground command and a checkout will be performed to ensure all systems are functioning. After checkout, WORF will be ready to support payload operations. Typical payload operations will include mounting the imaging equipment on the payload shelf, connecting power/data cables, powering payload subsystems and initiating payload software.

WORF Payload operations will consist of crew-tended or automated activities. For crew-tended operations, the WORF hatch will be removed and the crew member can use the payload shroud to block any incoming light from the U.S. Laboratory. For automated operations, the hatch will be installed to protect the payload hardware and commands can be sent to the payload via the ground or WORF laptop computer.

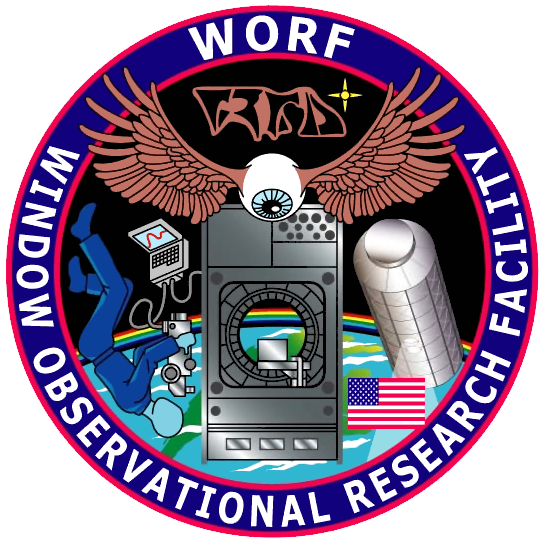
WORF mission patch

== WORF patch and Star Trek ==
As an allusion to the fictional character Worf from the science fiction television and movie franchise Star Trek, the mission patch incorporated text written in the Klingon language. The patch's creator contacted Star Trek producer Rick Berman for permission and to ensure correctness.

== See also ==
- Scientific research on the ISS
- Destiny (ISS module)

== Gallery ==
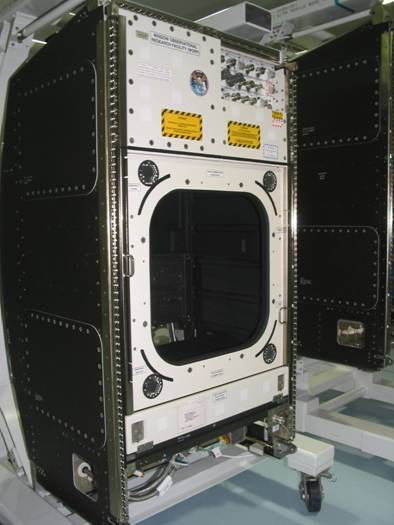
Close-up image of the Window Observation Research Facility (WORF) Flight rack at Kennedy Space Center.

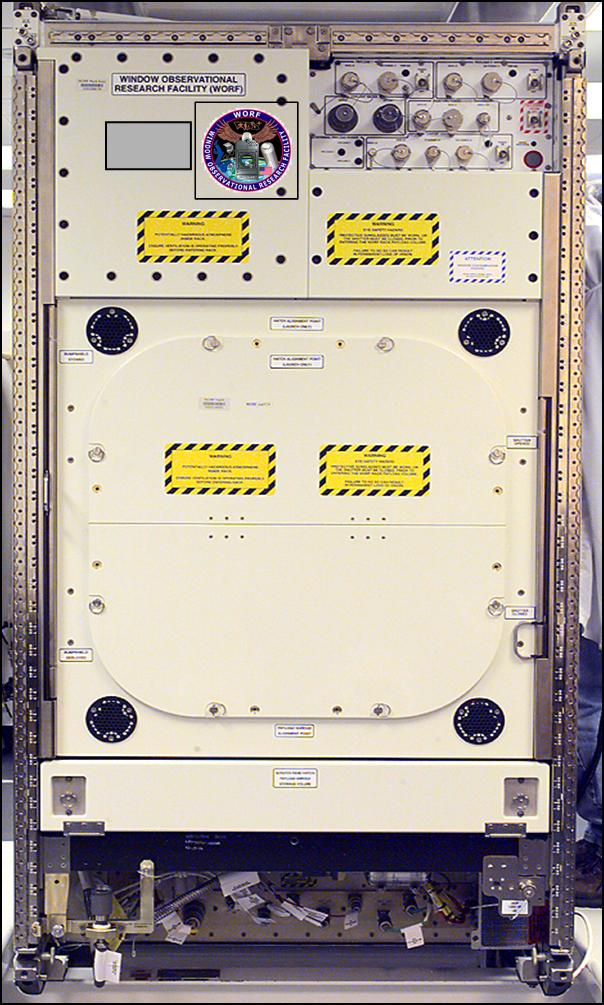
John Phillips, Expedition 11 Science Officer, with the Window Observation Research Facility (WORF) training rack at Johnson Space Center, Houston, TX.

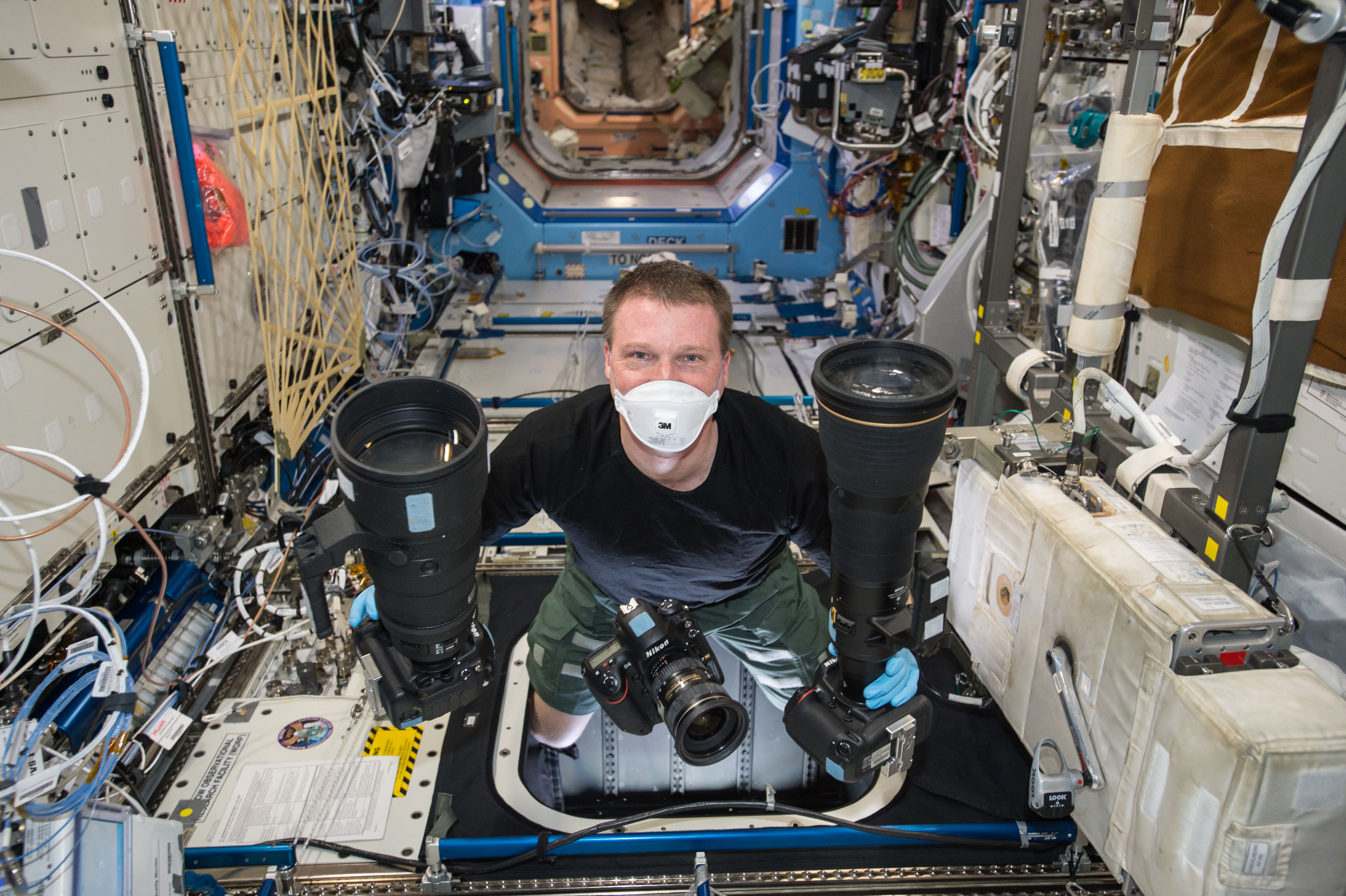
Terry Virts prepares to take photographs in the WORF

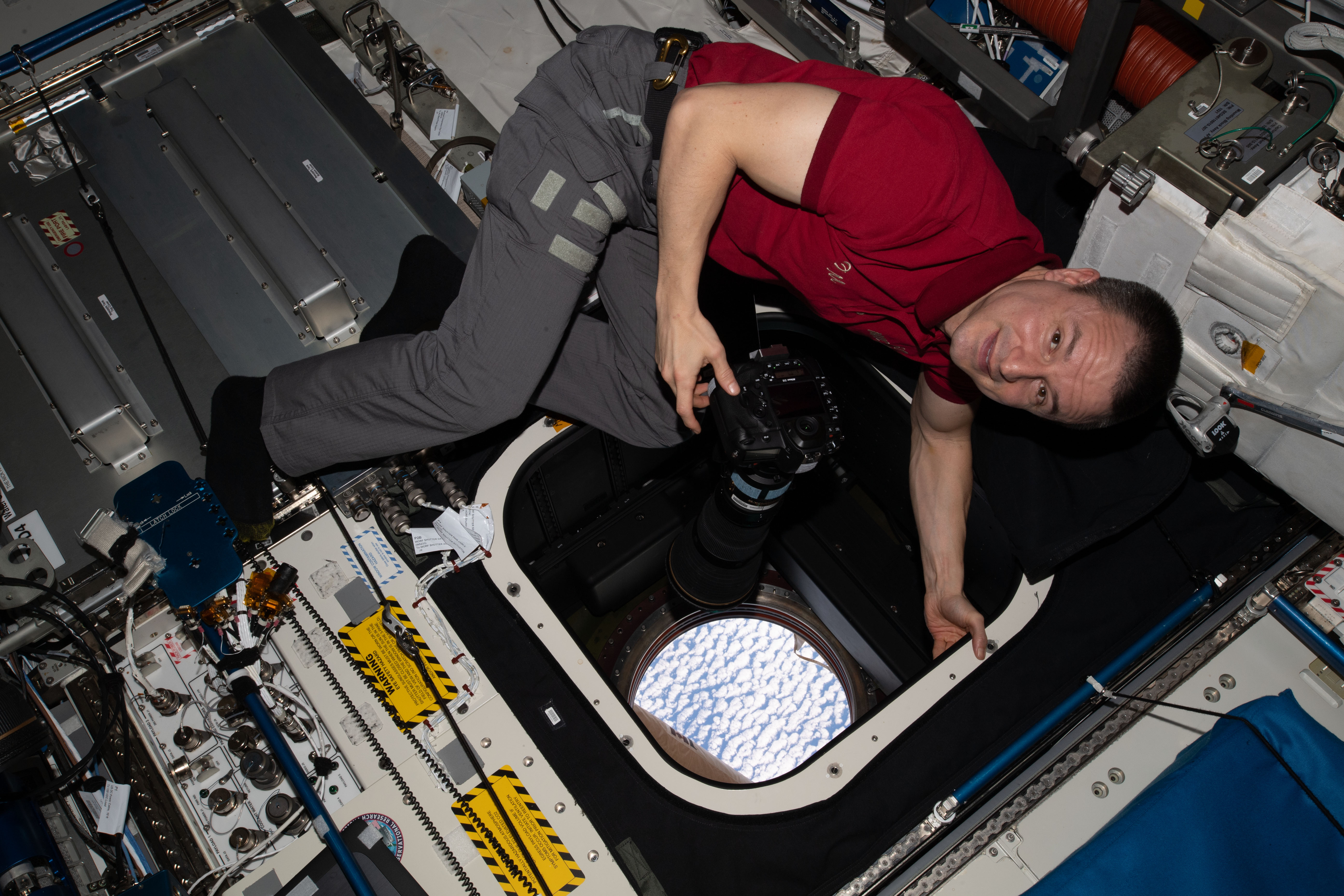
Andrew Morgan takes photographs of the Earth from the WORF

== Related publications ==
- Eppler D, Runco S. Earth Observations Capabilities of the Window Observational Research Facility on Board the International Space Station. American Institute of Aeronautics & Astronautics; AIAA-2001-4915. 2001
