= Felix Baumgartner =

Austrian skydiver and extreme sportsman (1969–2025)

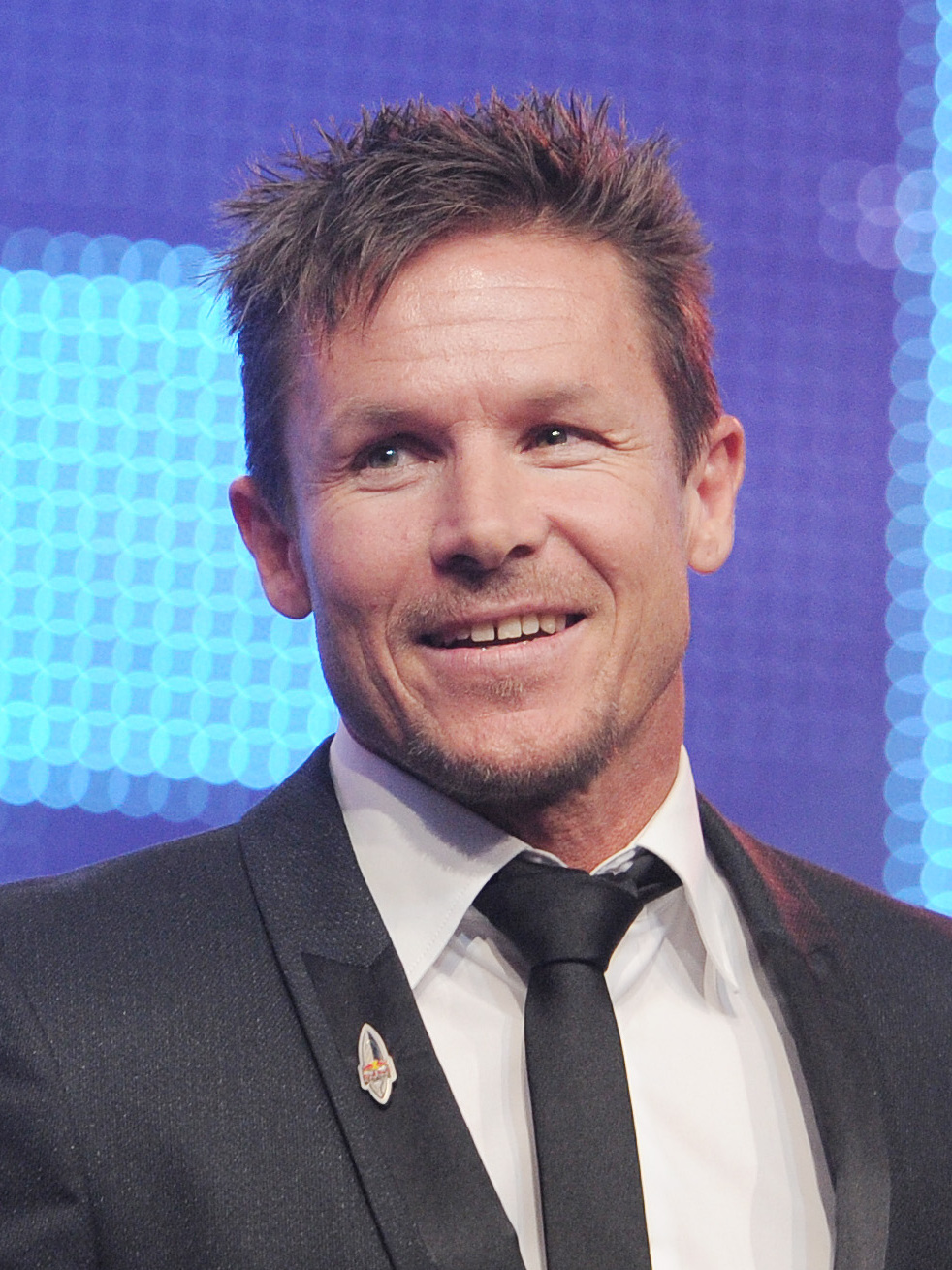
- Baumgartner in 2014
- Born: 20 April 1969; Salzburg, Austria
- Died: 17 July 2025 (aged 56); Porto Sant'Elpidio, Italy
- Other name: B.A.S.E. 502, Fearless Felix
- Website: felixbaumgartner.com

Felix Baumgartner (German: [ˈfeːlɪks ˈbaʊ̯mˌɡaʁtnɐ]; 20 April 1969 – 17 July 2025) was an Austrian skydiver, extreme sportsman, and BASE jumper. He was widely known for jumping to Earth from a helium balloon in the stratosphere on 14 October 2012 and landing in New Mexico, United States, as part of the Red Bull Stratos project. By doing so, he set world records for skydiving an estimated 39 km (24 mi), reaching an estimated top speed of 1,357.64 km/h (843.6 mph), or Mach 1.25. (Note: The FAI ratified the three world records claimed by Austrian parachutist Felix Baumgartner for Maximum Vertical Speed without a drogue (#16669) 1,357.6 kilometres per hour (843.6 mph), Exit Altitude (#16670) 38,969.4 metres (127,852 ft), and Vertical Distance of Freefall (#16671) 36,402.6 metres (119,431 ft). 14 October 2012 flight did not break the FAI Absolute Altitude (#2325) record for balloon flight set in 1961 by Malcolm Ross, which requires the balloonist to descend with the balloon.) He became the first person to break the sound barrier relative to the surface without vehicular power on his descent. He broke skydiving records for exit altitude (38,969.3 metres), vertical freefall distance without a drogue parachute, and vertical speed without a drogue. Although his name is still attached to the last two records, his exit altitude record was broken two years later, when on 24 October 2014, Alan Eustace jumped from 135,890 feet (41.42 km; 25.74 mi) with a drogue.

Baumgartner was also renowned for the particularly dangerous nature of the stunts he performed during his career. He spent time in the Austrian military, where he practised parachute jumping, including training to land on small target zones. On 17 July 2025, he died in a paragliding accident in Porto Sant'Elpidio, Italy, at the age of 56.

== Biography ==
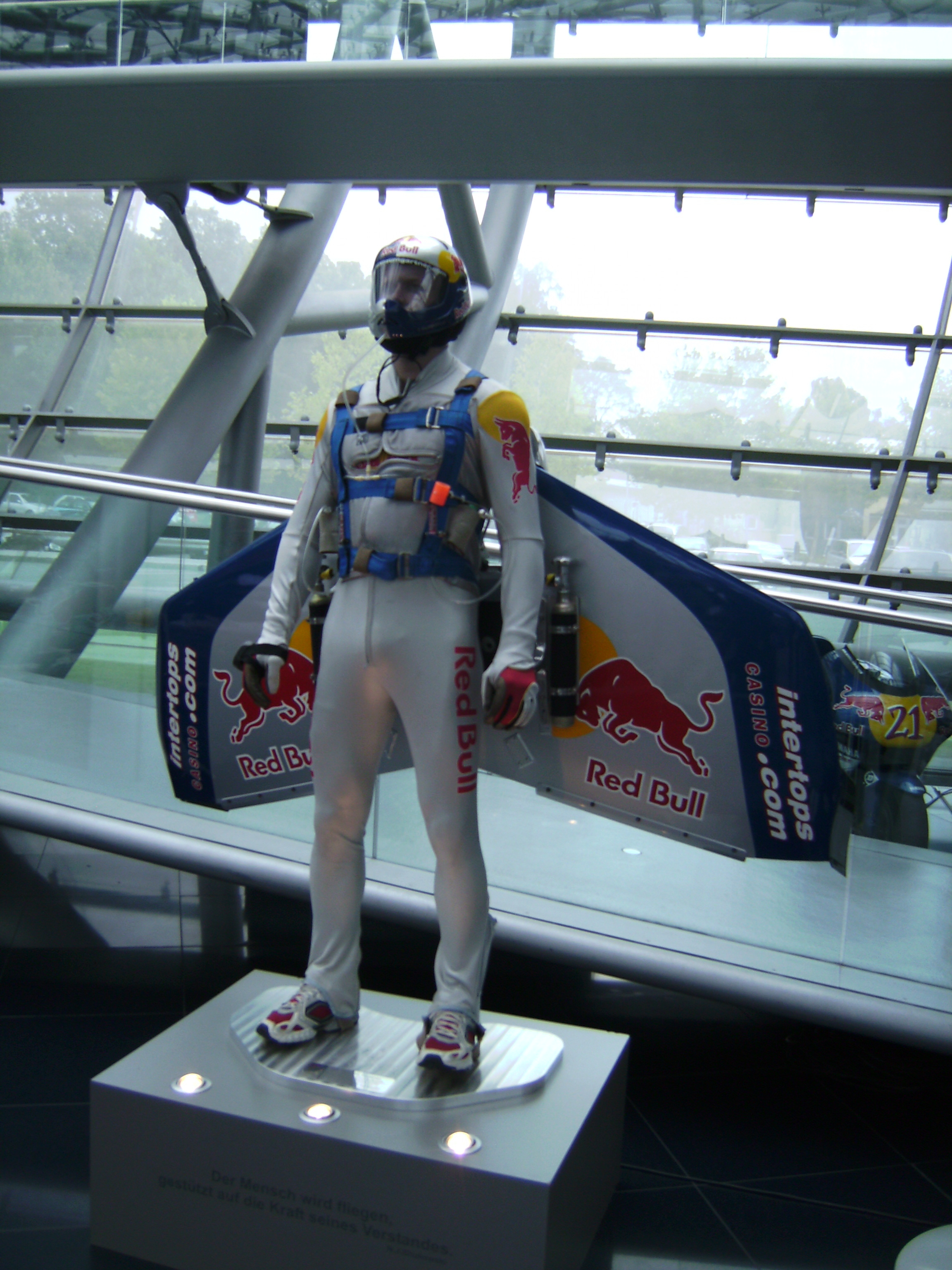
Suit used by Baumgartner to cross the Channel in 2003

Felix Baumgartner was born to Eva (Note: Baumgartner's mother's name has also been reported as Ava.) in Salzburg, Austria. He had a younger brother, Gerard. As a child, he dreamt about flying and skydiving. In 1999, he claimed the world record for the highest parachute jump from a building when he jumped from the Petronas Towers in Kuala Lumpur, Malaysia. On 20 July 2003, Baumgartner became the first person to skydive across the English Channel using a specially made carbon fiber wing. Alban Geissler, who developed the SKYRAY carbon fiber wing with Christoph Aarns, suggested after Baumgartner's jump that the wing he used was a copy of two prototype SKYRAY wings sold to Red Bull (Baumgartner's sponsor) two years earlier.

Baumgartner also set the world record for the lowest BASE jump ever, when he jumped 29 metres (95 ft) from the hand of the Christ the Redeemer statue in Rio de Janeiro. This jump also stirred controversy among BASE jumpers who pointed out that Baumgartner cited the height of the statue as the height of the jump even though he landed on a slope below the statue's feet, and that other BASE jumpers had previously jumped from the statue but avoided publicity.

He became the first person to BASE jump from the completed Millau Viaduct in France on 27 June 2004 and the first person to skydive onto, then BASE jump from, the Turning Torso building in Malmö, Sweden, on 18 August 2006. On 12 December 2007, he became the first person to conduct an unauthorised BASE jump from the 91st floor observation deck of the then-tallest completed building in the world, Taipei 101 in Taipei, Taiwan. Baumgartner was then banned from re-entry into Taiwan as a result of the incident.

=== Professional boxing ===
In 1992, Baumgartner had his first and only fight, in the welterweight class, which he won.

=== Red Bull Stratos ===
In January 2010, New Scientist reported that Baumgartner was working with a team of scientists and sponsor Red Bull GmbH to attempt the highest sky-dive on record, using a helium balloon.

==== Training for the jump ====
Baumgartner initially struggled with claustrophobia after spending time in the pressurised suit required for the jump, but overcame it with help from a sports psychologist and other specialists.

==== Test jumps ====
On 15 March 2012, Baumgartner completed the first of 2 test jumps from 21,818 metres (71,581 ft). During the jump, he spent approximately 3 minutes and 43 seconds in free fall, reaching speeds of more than 580 km/h (360 mph), before opening his parachute. In total, the jump lasted approximately eight minutes and eight seconds and Baumgartner became the third person to safely parachute from a height of over 21.7 km (13.5 mi).

On 25 July 2012, Baumgartner completed the second of two planned test jumps from 29,460 metres (96,640 ft). It took Baumgartner about 90 minutes to reach the target altitude and his free fall was estimated to have lasted three minutes and 48 seconds before his parachutes were deployed.

==== Main jump ====
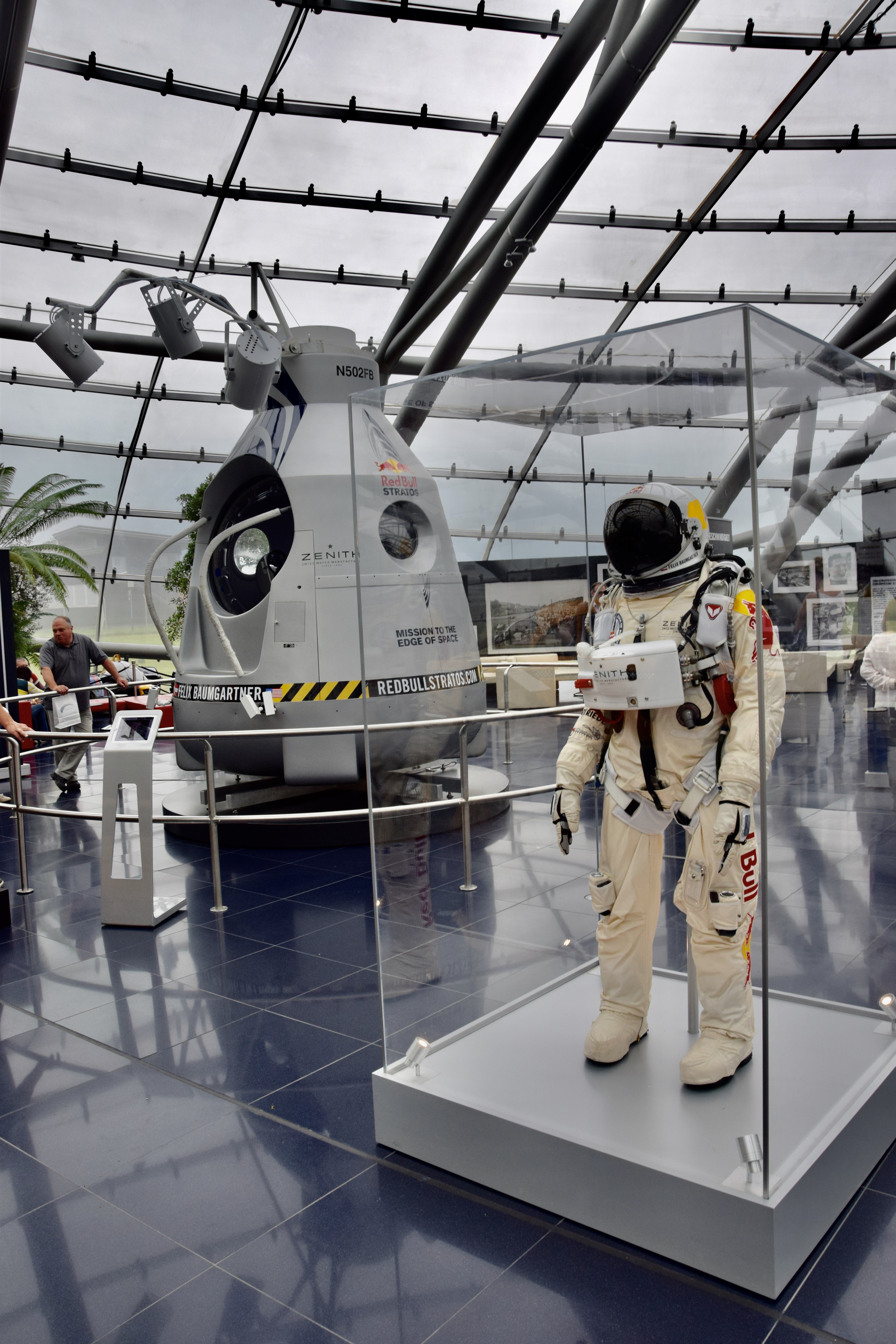
Baumgartner's Stratos suit and capsule on display in Hangar-7, 2015

The launch was originally scheduled for 9 October 2012 but was aborted due to adverse weather conditions. Launch was rescheduled and took place on 14 October 2012. Baumgartner landed in eastern New Mexico after jumping from a then world-record 38,969.3 metres (127,852 feet), falling a record distance of 36,402.6 metres (119,431 feet) and parachuting the final 2,566.7 metres (8,421 feet).

During this descent Baumgartner set the record for fastest speed of free fall at 1,357.64 km/h (843.6 mph; 377.1 m/s), making him the first human to break the sound barrier outside a vehicle. Baumgartner was in free fall for 4 minutes and 19 seconds, a fall time 17 seconds shorter than the record set during mentor Joseph Kittinger's jump on 16 August 1960. Kittinger was also in radio contact during the jump.

Two years and 10 days later Baumgartner's altitude record was broken by Alan Eustace.

=== Audi Motorsport ===
In 2014, Baumgartner decided to join Audi Motorsport to drive an Audi R8 LMS for the 2014 24 Hours of Nürburgring after racing Volkswagen Polos in 2013. He underwent another intense physical and driver training session to prepare him for the race. He helped the team to a ninth-place overall finish.

== Personal life ==
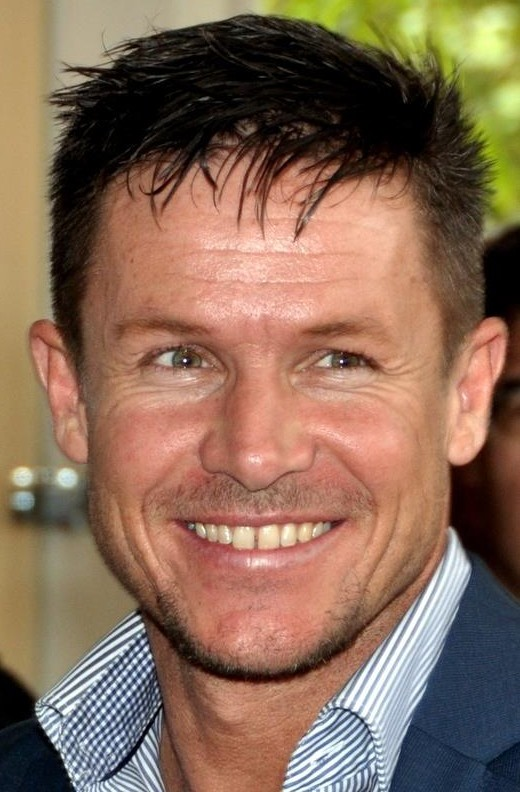
Baumgartner in 2013

In October 2012, when Baumgartner was asked in an interview with the Austrian newspaper Kleine Zeitung whether a political career was an option for his future life, he stated that the "example of Arnold Schwarzenegger" showed that "you can't move anything in a democracy" and that he would opt for a "moderate dictatorship [...] led by experienced personalities coming from the private (sector of the) economy". He finally stated that he "didn't want to get involved in politics".

On 6 November 2012, Baumgartner was convicted of battery and was fined €1500 after slapping the face of a Greek truck driver, following a petty argument between the two men.

In January 2016, Baumgartner provoked a stir of critical news coverage in his home country after posting several critical remarks against refugees and recommending the Hungarian Prime Minister Viktor Orbán for the Nobel Peace Prize. Later on, Baumgartner endorsed the presidential candidate of the right-wing populist Freedom Party of Austria, Norbert Hofer. On 13 July 2016, Facebook deleted his fan page of 1.5 million fans. Baumgartner subsequently claimed that he must have become "too uncomfortable" for "political elites".

After Austrian authorities refused to grant sports tax breaks to Baumgartner, he moved to Arbon, Switzerland, whereupon his house in Salzburg and his helicopter were seized.

Baumgartner dated Playboy German playmate of the century Gitta Saxx. Later, he was engaged to Nicole Öttl, a model and former beauty queen (Miss Lower Austria 2006). They separated in 2013.

From 2014 until 2025, he was in a relationship with the Romanian television presenter Mihaela Rădulescu Schwartzenberg.

== Death ==
On 17 July 2025, Baumgartner died at the age of 56 during a powered paragliding flight in Porto Sant'Elpidio, near the town of Fermo in Italy. He lost control of the craft and crashed into a wooden hut near a swimming pool of the Le Mimose Family Camping Village. One person was injured by debris from the impact. On 6 October 2025, the investigating attorney general released his final report, which revealed that the cause of the accident was human error, as the paraglider was in perfect condition and had no defects. The autopsy report of Baumgartner's body had already ruled out a heart attack as the cause of death.

== Awards and accolades ==
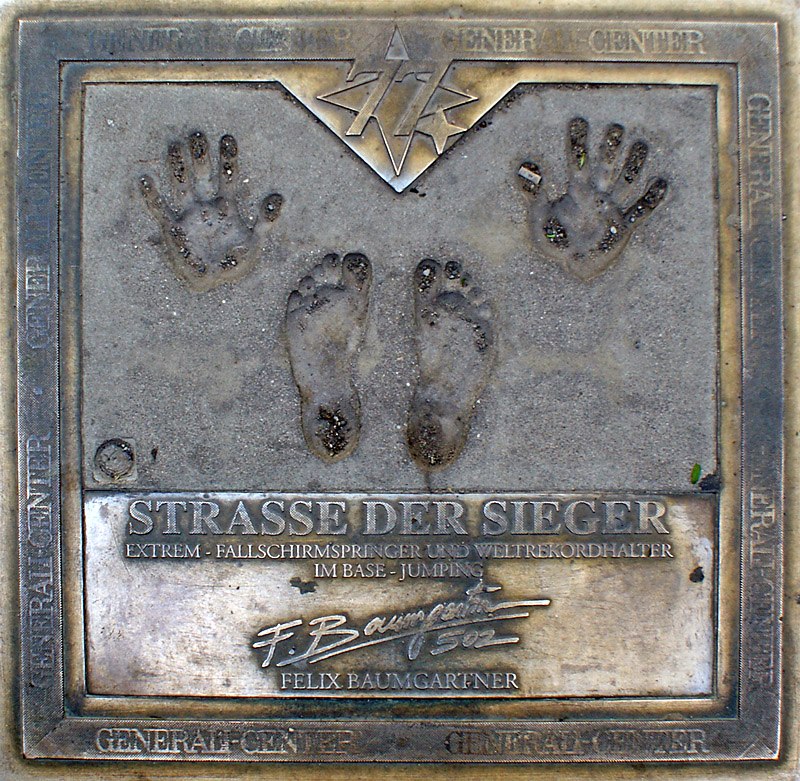
Tribute to Baumgartner in Straße der Sieger, Mariahilfer Street, Vienna, Austria

- In 2012, he won the Bambi award in the category of "Millennium".
- In December 2012, Baumgartner was named one of "The Men of the Year 2012" by Top Gear magazine.
- He was named Laureus World Action Sportsperson of the Year (12 March 2013).
- He received the Mankind Award at The 2013 Spike Guys' Choice Awards.
- Flying magazine ranked him number 46 on their 2013 list of "51 Heroes of Aviation"; he was the youngest living person on the list.

== See also ==
- Armstrong limit – Altitude above which water boils at body temperature
- Eugene Andreyev – Soviet air force colonel (1926–2000)
- Michel Fournier – French adventurer (born 1944)
- Nick Piantanida – American amateur parachute jumper (1932-1966)
- Nish Bruce – British soldier
- Project Manhigh – 1950s U.S. Air Force aero-medical research program
- Pyotr Dolgov – Soviet air force officer (1920–1962)
- Space diving – Skydiving from near space
- Steve Truglia – British stunt performer

== Sources ==
- Abrams, Michael (2006). Birdmen, Batmen, and Skyflyers: Wingsuits and the Pioneers Who Flew in Them, Fell in Them, and Perfected Them. New York City: Harmony Books. ISBN 978-1-4000-5491-6.

Records
Preceded by (United States) Joseph Kittinger	Highest space dive (38.969 km); 14 October 2012 – 24 October 2014	Succeeded by (United States) Alan Eustace
