= Janine Krippner =

Physical volcanologist from New Zealand

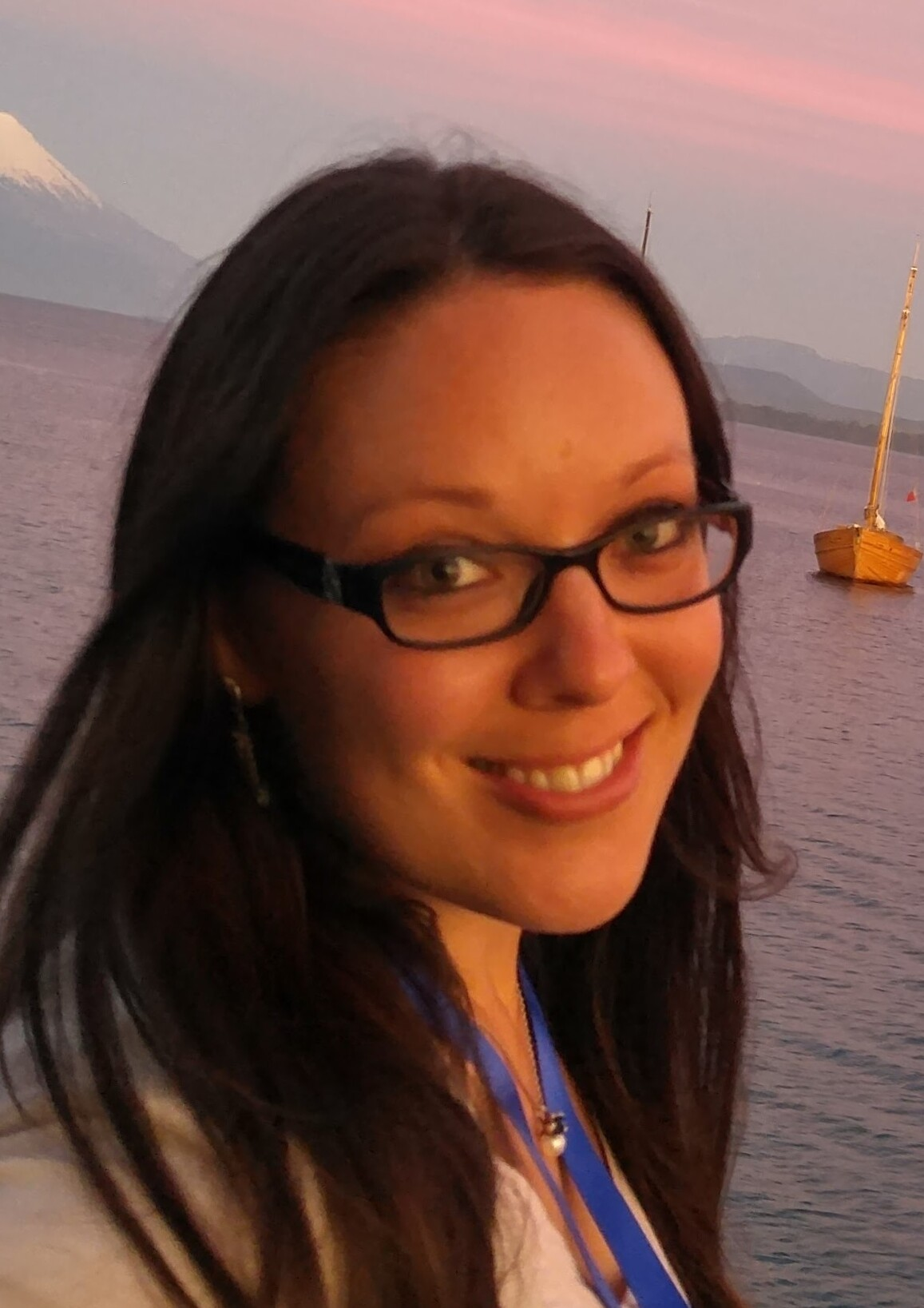
- Krippner in 2016
- Education: University of Pittsburgh; University of Waikato
- Known for: Volcanology; Science communication
- Scientific career
- Workplaces: Smithsonian Institution; Concord University; Shell Australia

Janine Krippner is a physical volcanologist from New Zealand who uses remote sensing to study pyroclastic flows and is a popular science communicator.

== Early life and education ==
Krippner was born in Te Awamutu, New Zealand. She completed her Bachelors (2006) and Masters (2009) at the University of Waikato under the supervision of Roger Briggs. For this work she studied Mount Ngauruhoe, an active basaltic andesite-to-andesite composite cone volcano. She worked for Shell Australia between 2010 and 2012 as a graduate geoscientist. She completed her PhD on "Large dome collapse driven block-and-ash flows on Shiveluch volcano, Kamchatka, and pyroclastic flows on Mount St. Helens", at the University of Pittsburgh in 2017, funded by NASA. Whilst a PhD student she was listed by Wired as one of the top scientists to follow on Twitter. Krippner was appointed a Phipps Science Communication Fellow in 2015.

== Research and career ==
Krippner joined Concord University as a postdoctoral researcher in 2018, where she continued her PhD research on pyroclastic density currents. She was part of a volcanic tephra project THROUGHPUT: Standards and Services for Community Curated Repositories, looking at Cascades Range volcanic deposits. The project, funded by the National Science Foundation EarthCube program, looks to report research in earth sciences using online tools, social media, and publicly accessible databases.

Between 2019 and 2020 Krippner worked as a Contract Scientist for the Smithsonian Institution's Global Volcanism Program (GVP) writing volcanic activity reports for their Bulletin of the Global Volcanism Network, and later as an Image Collection and Outreach Specialist to update photo captions, revise volcanic hazard galleries in coordination with the VolFilms project, and expand the GVP image collection, as well as continuing to write volcano reports.

Krippner is best known for her active presence on social media, sharing stories about volcanic eruptions. Krippner followed the activity of Mount Agung from Pittsburgh using social media and official monitoring information, providing clear explanations for the technical language and directing people to reliable sources. She used Twitter to provide information about the volcano's activity in English, helping tourists on-site. Due to her efforts during the Agung eruption, she was given the Geosciences in the Media Award for 2020 by the AAPG.

Krippner keeps a popular science blog In the Company of Volcanoes with Alison Graettinger. She has served as an editor of the open-access journal Volcanica. Along with Erik Klemetti, in 2019 she began hosting the Popular Volcanics podcast.
