= Abigail Harrison =

American internet personality and science communicator

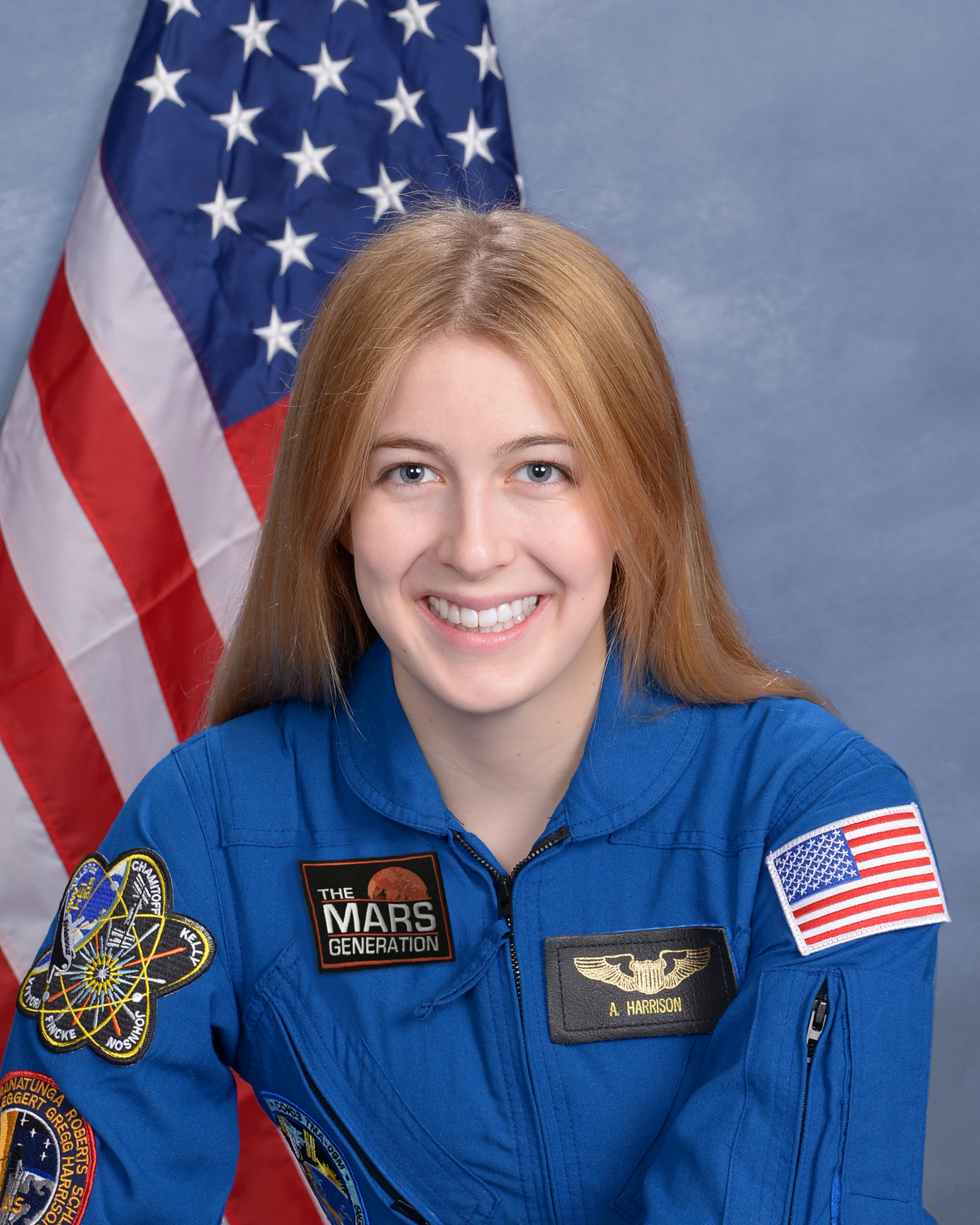
- Harrison in 2015
- Born: June 11, 1997 (age 29); Saint Paul, Minnesota, U.S.
- Education: Wellesley College (BA)
- Occupation: Science communication
- Employer: The Mars Generation
- Known for: Astronaut Abby

Abigail Harrison (born June 11, 1997), also known as Astronaut Abby, is an American internet personality and science communicator, particularly in the area of the United States space program. Harrison is the founder and current leader of The Mars Generation, a 501(c)(3) nonprofit. She is not an astronaut.

== Early life and education ==
Harrison was born in 1997 in Saint Paul, Minnesota. Harrison has sought to become the first person on Mars since an early age. Harrison attended Saint Paul and Minneapolis Public Schools for K-12 education. Harrison graduated in 2019 from Wellesley College with a Bachelors of Arts. She pursued astrobiology (self-made major) and Russian Area Studies degrees.

== Career ==
=== The Mars Generation ===
In 2015, Harrison founded the 501(c)(3) nonprofit called The Mars Generation and currently serves as the President of the Executive Board. The Mars Generation is an American non-governmental nonprofit organization involved in public outreach and advocating for human space exploration and science, technology, engineering, and mathematics (STEM) education.

The Mars Generation offers 3 main programs. The Future of Space Outreach program encourages the support of space exploration and STEM education. The Student Space Ambassador Leadership Program (SSA) is a dual program in mentorship and leadership designed to provide school and career guidance to students ages 13–24.

The final program provides full paid scholarships for students demonstrating financial need to attend U.S. Space Camp. In order to apply for consideration students need to be age 15–17, demonstrate interest in space exploration and an aptitude in STEM and complete the application, including obtaining a recommendation from a teacher and/or mentor.

=== Author ===
In January 2021, Penguin Random House published a book by Harrison titled "Dream Big! How To Reach For Your Stars". Harrison and Random House have stated that any proceeds from the sale of the book will be donated to The Mars Generation, Harrison's nonprofit organization.

=== Public engagement ===
Harrison's online presence as Astronaut Abby was spurred from an 8th grade National History Day project titled 'Debate and Diplomacy: The History of the ISS". Harrison set up a Twitter account under the name of AstronautAbby to connect with NASA employees to get a quote for her project. On May 28, 2013, Harrison attended the Soyuz TMA-09M launch of her mentor, Astronaut Luca Parmitano, to the International Space Station, becoming Parmitano's Earth Liaison. As his Earth Liaison, she shared his 6-month experience of living in space with her social media community.
