= Scott J. Bolton =

American physicist

- Bolton in 2026
- Education: University of Michigan, BSc; University of California, Berkeley, PhD
- Occupation: Astrophysicist
- Scientific career
- Fields: Planetary science Theoretical physics Space physics Astrophysics

Scott J. Bolton is an American theoretical and experimental space physicist. He is an associate vice president of the Southwest Research Institute Space Science and Engineering Division. His research area is planetary sciences with a focus on the giant planets and the origin of the Solar System. Previously serving as a member of the Galileo and Cassini–Huygens missions, Bolton became the Principal Investigator of Juno, a New Frontiers program mission to Jupiter which began primary science in 2016.

== Career ==
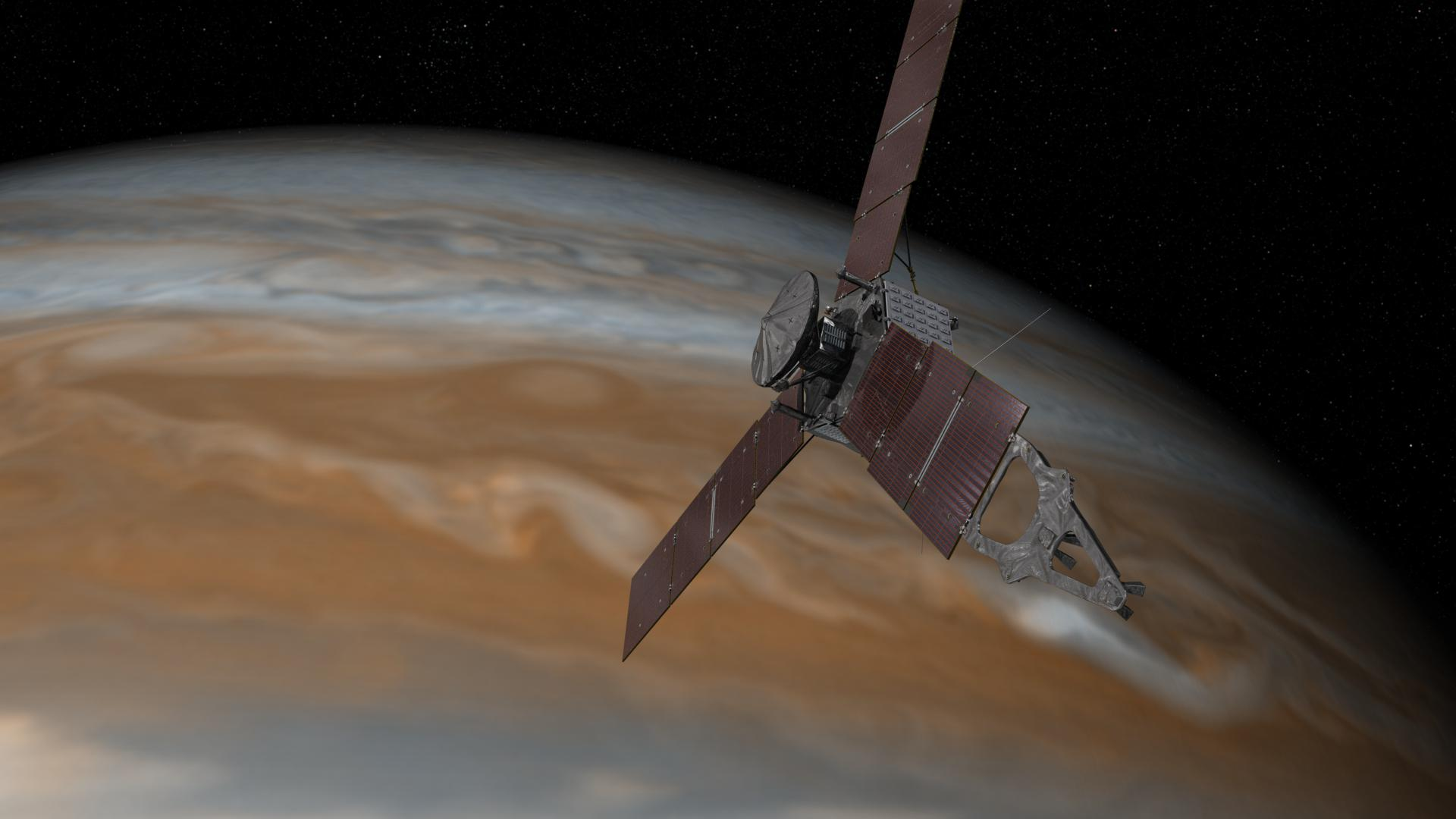
The Juno mission, of which Scott Bolton is the principal investigator.

Bolton is the principal investigator for Juno, a mission launched in 2011 to study Jupiter's origin, atmosphere, magnetosphere and interior structure, part of NASA's New Frontiers program to explore the outer planets of the solar system. Bolton previously served on the Galileo mission as a member of the plasma spectrometer team and plasma wave instrument team.

Bolton is a Co-Investigator on a number of NASA missions including experiments on the Cassini-Huygens mission. During the early phases of the Cassini mission, Dr. Bolton chaired the Titan observation planning group for the Cassini-Huygens mission and helped formulate of the scientific investigation of Saturn's moon Titan. Bolton has been a Principal Investigator with NASA on various research programs since 1988. His research includes the modeling of the Jovian and Saturnian radiation belts, atmospheric dynamics and composition, and the formation and evolution of the Solar System. He has authored over 250 scientific papers, five book chapters, and consulted/appeared in five space science documentaries. He also received JPL Individual Awards for Exceptional Excellence in Leadership in 2002, 2001, and 1996, and Excellence in Management in 2000; and has received over twenty NASA Group Achievement Awards. Bolton maintains a relationship with JPL and the California Institute of Technology through a special appointment as a Senior Staff Scientist.

He received the NASA Exceptional Achievement Medal in 2002 and the NASA Outstanding Leadership Medal in 2012. In 2018, Bolton was awarded Smithsonian Magazine's American Ingenuity Award in the Physical Sciences category.

He is an associate vice president of the Southwest Research Institute in the Space and Engineering Division.

== Education ==
Bolton has a B.S. in Aerospace Engineering from the University of Michigan and a Ph.D. in Astrophysics from the University of California at Berkeley.

== Educational outreach ==
Bolton also leads a number of educational programs aimed at developing science, math and art skills for children from elementary to high school and college level. As part of the NASA Juno Educational Outreach Program (E/PO), He has helped develop educational programs involving both formal and informal education including the creation of science and math curriculum driving new national standards for elementary level education (an age bracket known to be underserved in this area). Bolton has worked with a number of corporate sponsors dedicated to space science educational programs, including Lego, Universal, Sony, and Time-Warner. For example, Bolton and his team worked with Lego to include a trio of solid aluminum figurines representing Juno, Jupiter, and Galileo riding in the Juno spacecraft.

Bolton partnered with the Lewis Center for Educational Excellence on an innovative educational program that provides elementary to high school students an opportunity to experience the scientific and engineering process directly. This program trains teachers on science and math education and provides access to NASA research facilities and scientists for hundreds of schools around the country.

Through his private company, Artistic Sciences, Inc, Bolton's has produced a number of musical concerts, art exhibits, scientific documentaries and videos aimed at inspiring and motivating children in academic studies. He has worked with a number of musical artists developing both educational and musical programs. He has worked with the composer Vangelis in creation the Vangelis Foundation in Athens, Greece dedicated to the combined study of Science, Math, Art, Music and Philosophy.
