= History of aviation medicine =

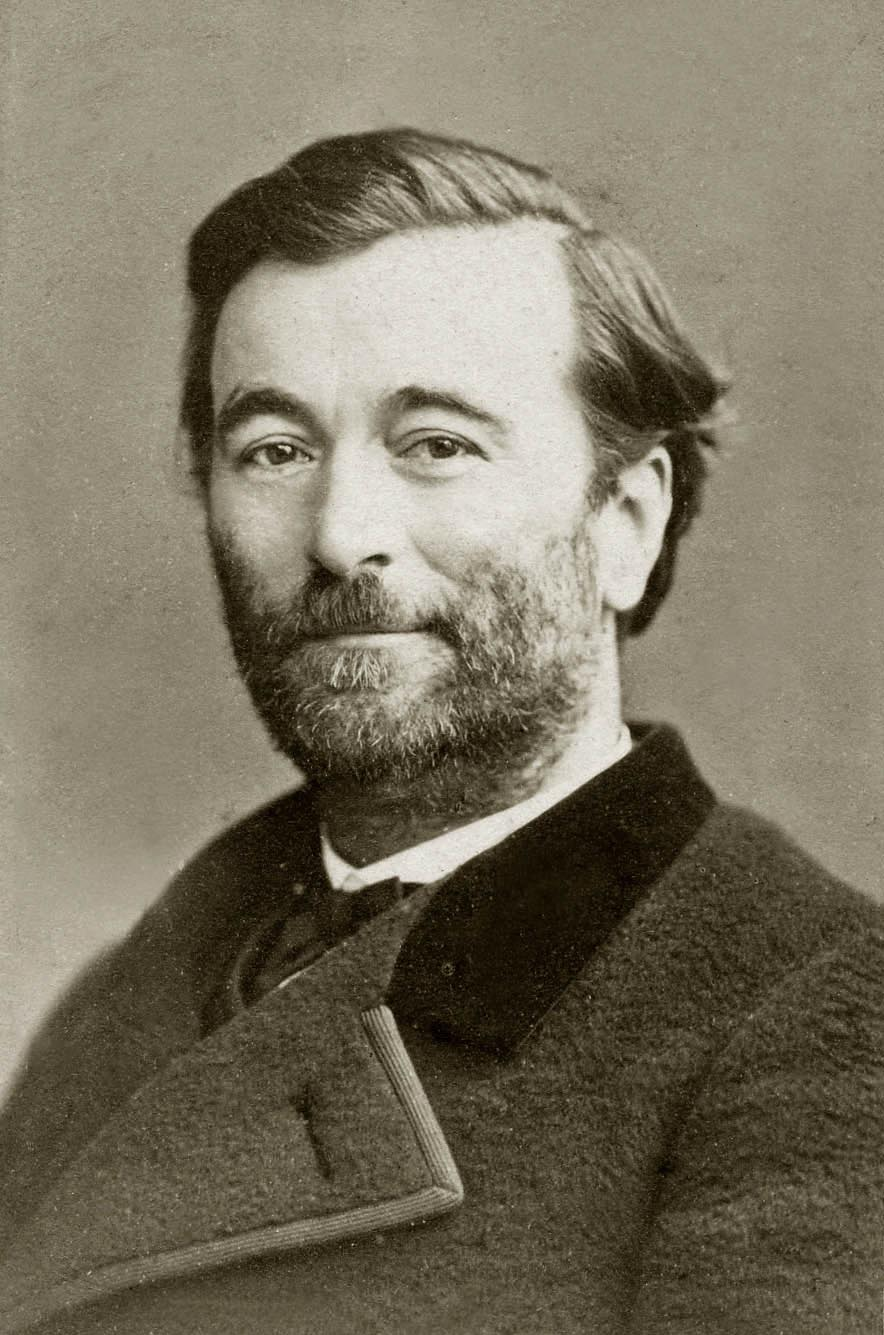
Paul Bert, French zoologist and the architect of aviation medicine

The history of aviation medicine began largely after World War I, when aircraft needed to fly to higher altitudes. In the Jet Age, aircraft became pressurised so rapid decompression became a hazard leading to passing out, high g-forces which led to G-LOC and ejection seats caused spinal compression and other injuries. Much of the adverse health effects in aviation are caused by rapid changes in atmospheric pressure, such as decompression sickness.

Aviation medicine is not purposed for people with diseases, but contingencies have been developed to allow people to go into low pressure environments, which in itself is a large medical challenge.

Paul Bert (1833–1886) of France is known as the Father of Aviation Medicine, the first to research effects of air-pressure on health and oxygen toxicity; he worked with the French meteorologist Gaston Tissandier. The first fatalities from aviation hypoxia occurred on 15 April 1875 in France, when the balloon Zenith reached 28,200 ft.

== Early research on altitude sickness ==
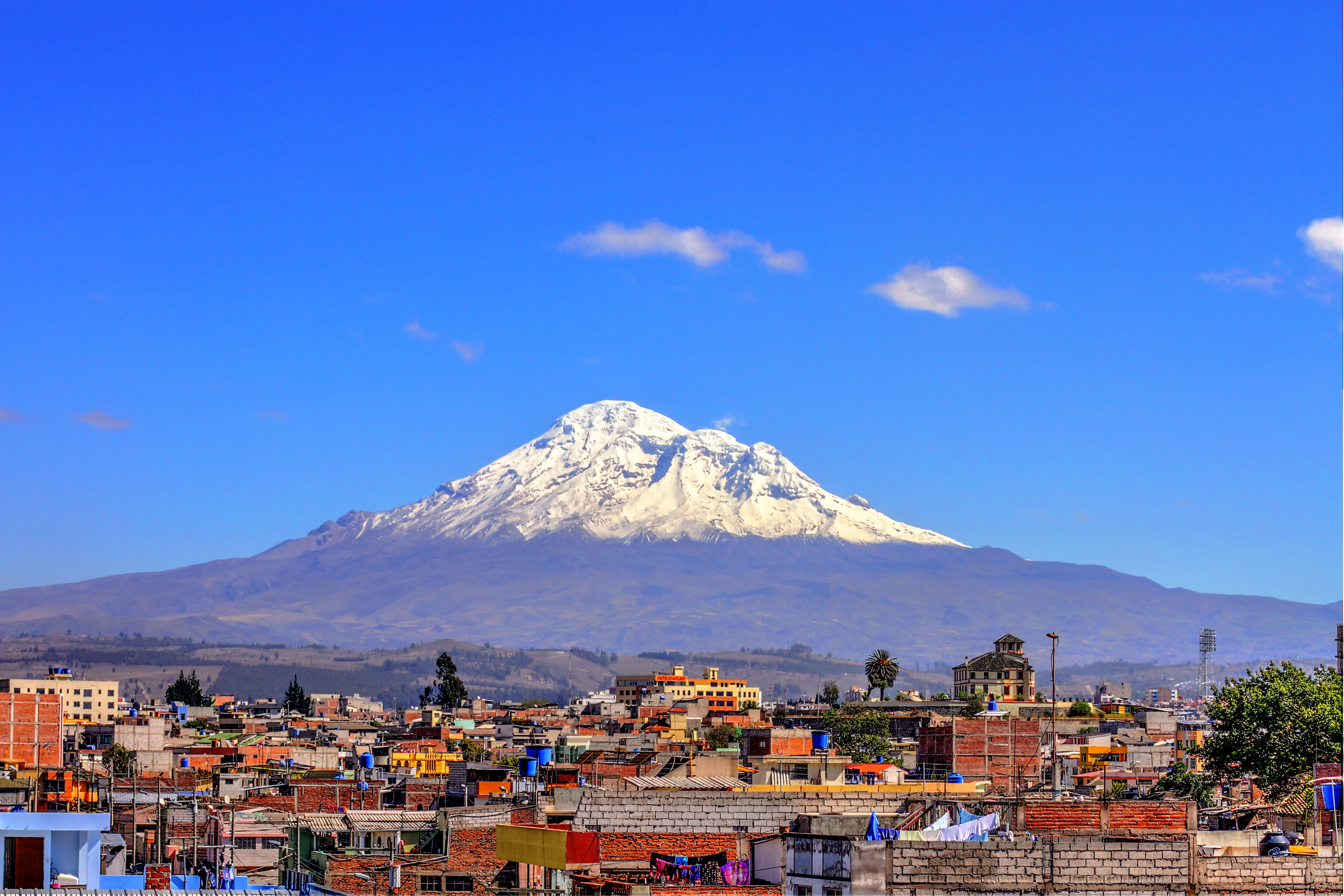
Chimborazo in July 2014

Alexander von Humboldt in 1802 climbed 19,286 feet up Chimborazo, setting a record, but suffered oxygen starvation in the blood. This was described as 'mountain sickness', or altitude sickness. Denis Jourdanet, of France, later described this as 'anoxemia'.

The summit of Chimborazo, in Ecuador, is the furthest place away from the centre of the Earth, due to the Earth being flatter at the poles.

Austrian Hermann von Schrötter was one of the first to look at decompression, when he joined the Berlin Aero Club in 1900, flying in a balloon with meteorologists Arthur Berson and Reinhard Süring. He worked with German Nathan Zuntz.

Similar work on decompression was done by Sir Joseph Barcroft in Britain, and Yandell Henderson of the US. Archibald Hill worked on oxygen and the blood. James Leatham Birley of the RAF looked at the effects of altitude. Martin Flack also looked at medical needs of pilots.

On 31 July 1901 German meteorologists Arthur Berson and Reinhard Süring reached 10,800 metres in an unenclosed balloon. From this ascent, German meteorologist Richard Assmann and French meteorologist Léon Teisserenc de Bort discovered the stratosphere in 1902.

== World War I ==
Italy was the first country to develop research into aviation medicine in World War I, followed by France. Britain was the first country to look at the effects of atmospheric pressure on pilots. By 1917, Britain and America were collaborating on research into aviation medicine, with a combined report in March 1918 started by Brigadier General Theodore C. Lyster (1875–1933), who helped to form the United States Army Air School of Aviation Medicine in 1918.

The Royal Flying Corps (RFC) did not believe in issuing any of their World War I pilots with parachutes, as the 'stiff upper lip' British believed that parachutes could 'impair the fighting spirit of pilots'. But other air forces, instead, issued their World War I pilots with parachutes.

== Interwar era ==
In the interwar era, techniques in aviation medicine mainly started; aircraft were gradually becoming more advanced. The United States passed its Air Commerce Act on 20 May 1926, which laid down medical regulations for commercial pilots. In 1931, the Swiss physicist Auguste Piccard made important investigations of atmospheric pressure of the upper atmosphere (mesosphere).

The first textbook on aviation medicine was written in 1919 by Henry Graeme Anderson (1882-1925), in the UK. He was a surgeon at the Royal Air Force Central Hospital. It included work by Martin William Flack and Oliver Horsley Gotch (1889-1974), published by Hodder & Stoughton; his grandfather John Callcott Horsley had designed the world's first Christmas card in 1843; his father was the neuroscientist Francis Gotch.

An early 'catapulted cockpit' was developed by Romanian Anastase Dragomir, and first tested by Lucien Bossoutrot, on 28 August 1929, in France.

=== High altitude enclosed ballooning ===
On November 4 1927 Hawthorn Charles Gray, of the US, is claimed to have reached around 12,950m in a US Army balloon. He had died of hypoxia, when the balloon descended.

So Auguste Piccard designed an aluminium balloon, made by Georges L'Hoir of Liège of Belgium. The breathing apparatus was by Hermann Stelzner (1884-1942) of Dräger (company) in Lübeck. The balloon was made by August Riedinger of Augsburg. It flew in 1931 and 1932.

In only a few years, the Soviet balloon USSR-1 on September 30 1933 reached 18,482m. On January 30 1934 the Soviet balloon Osoaviakhim-1 reached 21,978m, but crashed.

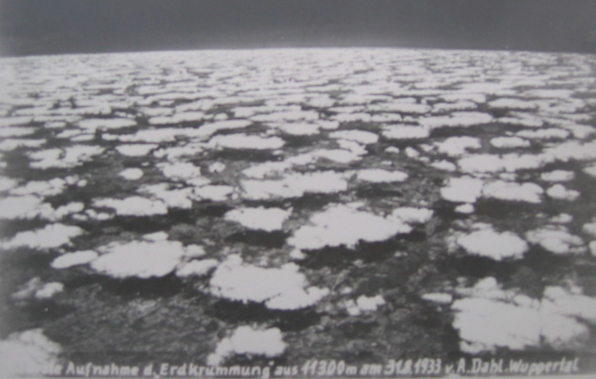
August 1933 picture showing the curvature of the Earth

In May 1934 meteorologists Martin Schrenk and Victor Masuch at Bitterfeld in eastern Germany, died of hypoxia. The balloon landed at Sebezh in Pskov Oblast in Russia, with no-one aboard. The balloon was 'Bartsch von Sigsfeld', named after the German balloonist Hans Bartsch von Sigsfeld (1861-1902). On 31 August 1933 this balloon had reached a height of 11,300m, which is the highest altitude that an unenclosed balloon has ever reached, piloted by Alexander Dahl.

The US Army Explorer II balloon reached 22,066m on November 11 1935, launched from the Stratobowl at Rapid City, South Dakota.

=== Pressurised aircraft ===
The first pressurised aircraft flew on 8 June 1921 in the US.

In 1935 Harry George Armstrong described what cabins should have.

In France, Air Minister Pierre Cot would not fund any work on pressurised aircraft from the early 1930s. Early pressurised aircraft included the Farman F.1000 and a version of the Farman F.220, from the Farman Aviation Works of France. The Renard R.35 of Alfred Renard of Belgium, first flew on April 1 1938, but crashed, killing the pilot Georges Van Damme.

In Germany the Junkers Ju 49 first flew on October 2 1931, developed by Justus Muttray. Another project was the Junkers EF 61, which first flew in March 1937. Junkers went no further in this area, but Henschel & Son produced the Henschel Hs 128, Henschel Hs 129 and Henschel Hs 130. Arado Flugzeugwerke proposed the Arado E.340. But the Luftwaffe took scant interest in such aircraft, as most were highly difficult to build, or fly. In Germany Theodor Benzinger looked at the health effects of high altitude.

In Italy, in the 1930s research was carried out at the Direzione superiore studi ed esperienze at Guidonia Air Base, by Tommaso Lomonaco, with assistance from Amedeo Herlitzka; he invented the plethysmograph, and worked with Angelo Mosso. Mosso had built a laboratory on Monte Rosa, to test hypoxia and hypocapnia, where Nathan Zuntz worked with Adolf Loewy. It was led by Col Mario Pezzi (aviator), who on October 22 1938 climbed to 17,083 m in a Caproni Ca.161 biplane, which still holds this aviation record.

In Spain, Emilio Herrera Linares built the stratonautical space suit in 1935, at Madrid–Cuatro Vientos Airport and Guadalajara, Spain.

In the US, Carl Greene developed the Lockheed XC-35, which first flew on May 9 1937. The Boeing 307 Stratoliner began passenger service in July 1940. The Douglas DC-4 entered service in 1942, developed from the 1938 Douglas DC-4E. Russell Colley of the Goodrich Corporation at Akron, Ohio developed a pressure suit for pilot Wiley Post, and later for the first NASA astronauts in the early 1960s. John David Akerman (1897-1972) also developed a pressure suit at the University of Minnesota College of Science and Engineering.

In the Soviet Union, Yevgeny Chertovsky designed a pressure suit in 1931.

In the UK, the Bristol Type 138 set height records, but the pilot Ronald Swain wore a suit developed by Sir Robert Henry Davis of Siebe-Gorman, with additional work by Sir Leonard Hill (physiologist).

=== Centrifugal research ===
Germany started centrifugal research in 1935.

Paul Garsaux (1882-1970) and André Broca (1863-1925), in France, were the first to look at centrifugal effects on animals.

In the US, research into anti-G suits took place at the Mayo Clinic at Albuquerque, New Mexico, led by William Randolph Lovelace II and James Paget Henry (1914-96), educated at Sidney Sussex College, Cambridge.

=== Breathing equipment ===
At the Mayo Clinic in Albuquerque, Arthur H. Bulbulian developed the A-14 oxygen mask.

== World War II ==
By 1941–42, some production military aircraft were pressurised for the first time.

From 1940-51 much work was conducted by John Farquhar Fulton at a university aeromedical unit. At this centre, Samuel Gelfan, Leslie F. Nims, and Robert Burr Livingston looked at explosive decompression. M Laurent, M Richou and Paul Garsaux looked at decompression in France.

Research in the war for the RAF was conducted by Roland Henry Winfield DFC (20 December 1910 - 1 November 1970), who flew on twenty bombing missions, from August 1941 to July 1942, to look at the effect of amphetamine (benzedrine).

A few reconnaissance high-altitude versions of the Mosquito had a pressurised cabin from around 1944, but nothing else did. But it was British civil engineer Sir Ernest William Moir who had developed the first air-lock and recompression chamber, in 1889.

Most revolutionary new Luftwaffe aircraft were tested at Müritz Airpark at Rechlin in north-east Germany. During the war, Junkers produced the Junkers Ju 188, Junkers Ju 288 and Junkers Ju 388 for high-altitude flight, although only the Ju 388 was designed with a pressurised cabin from the outset. The Germans never produced a high-altitude fighter aircraft, with the closest being the Blohm & Voss BV 155, and the prototype Focke-Wulf Ta 152 and the Focke-Wulf Ta 153 design. Hermann Tietze at Draeger developed a pressure suit by the end of the war, which would have been worn by pilots of the proposed manned-rocket Bachem Ba 349 Natter.

The Luftwaffe had medical research conducted by Hubertus Strughold (1898 - 1986), who worked with Hermann Becker-Freyseng and Siegfried Ruff. The chief of the Luftwaffe Medical Service was Oskar Schröder. Strughold later joined NASA and was heavily involved with life support systems for the Apollo program.

=== Ejection seats ===
The Germans were the first to develop ejection seats from 1939, and in January 1942 Helmut Schenck was the first to eject, out of a turbojet Heinkel He 280, developed by Ulf Weiß-Vogtmann (1900-89).

The Heinkel He 219 Uhu nightfighter was the first production aircraft to have an ejection seat fitted, as standard equipment. On 11 April 1944, at 11.08pm, a Heinkel He 219, of 2./NJG 1, was shot down by a Mosquito of 239 Sqn at RAF West Raynham, over Weert in the south-east of the Netherlands, and Unteroffizier Herter ejected.

Over 60 Luftwaffe pilots made ejections in the course of the war, from April 1944.

== Post-war ==
In the post-war era, jet aircraft were now commonplace. Jet engines allowed aircraft to reach much higher altitudes; an aircraft has a maximum height it can reach known as its ceiling.

The 1950 Heathrow BEA Vickers Viking crash was investigated in 1952 by Donald Teare, who found that many deaths were caused by seat belts.

Wilbur R. Franks looked at centrifugal effects in Canada, and invented the G suit, and similar work was conducted in Australia by Professor Frank Cotton, who invented another G-suit.

Hugh DeHaven conducted much research into surviving accidents in the US.

=== Ejection seats ===
Sgt Lawrence Lambert was the first American to eject, out of a Northrop XP-61, over Wright-Patterson Air Force Base in Dayton, Ohio.

Around August 1947, ejection seats were tested by a Gloster Meteor III, piloted by John Ernest Dudley Scott (May 10 1908 - April 23 2002), known as Jack Scott. Later tests were by Sqn Ldr John Stewart Fifield DFC, in a Meteor VII. In October 1955, he ejected at 40,000ft. Fifield had flown with nightfighter Mosquitos with 169 Sqn in Norfolk.

On May 30 1949 the first operational firing of a Martin-Baker seat was by J.O. Lancaster, who landed near Long Itchington in Warwickshire.

In the 1950s the US Navy tested its Martin Baker ejection seats at Naval Air Station Patuxent River.

=== Record ejection height ===
On Wednesday April 9 1958 the record for the highest ejection was set over Monyash in Derbyshire, at 56,000 ft. The previous highest ejection was 45,200 ft in 1954, by a USAF pilot. Pilot Flt Lt (John) Peter Fane de Salis, aged 29 of Hythe, Hampshire and navigator Fl Off Patrick Henry George Lowe, aged 23 of Potters Bar in Hertfordshire, ejected from Canberra B6 'WT207', which had a booster Napier Double Scorpion rocket attached, to reach high altitude, where the Canberra of 76 Sqn, which took off from RAF Hemswell at 3pm, had climbed from 45,000 ft, to 60,000 ft, in 4 minutes. The Canberra had earlier flown from RAF Cranfield, but the Bedfordshire airfield was closed.

Ejecting at that height could be fatal, as the temperatures at 56,000ft is -93 C, and air pressure is 1.2 pounds per square inch; a minimum of 2.7 pounds per square inch is needed to get oxygen into the blood. At that altitude, you would expect to live for 15 seconds.

Both pilots freefalled for around nine miles, before the parachutes opened at 10,000ft. On landing, blood was coming from their eyes, nose and ears. Parts of their body, and face, had greatly swollen in the life-threatening low pressure conditions. Both were taken to Bakewell Cottage Hospital, then Chesterfield Royal Hospital, when none had broken bones. Later taken to Princess Mary's Royal Air Force Hospital Halton. Their eyes stopped bleeding after two days. Their sinuses were full of blood. This is the highest ever ejection from an aircraft.

Peter de Salis in the 1960s flew the Shackleton with 206 Sqn at RAF Kinloss, and left the RAF in 1968 and flew with British Caledonian until the 1980s: he died in January 2005, in Itchingfield in West Sussex. He was the grandson of Australian Leopold William Jerome Fane De Salis (1845-1930).

Pat Lowe later became an air traffic controller in west London, and died in February 2014.

=== Rocket ejection ===
The first rocket ejection seat was tested in Gloster Meteor VII 'WA634' mid-March 1962 with 36-year-old Sqn Ldr Peter Howard (December 15 1925 - October 21 2007), of Church Crookham in Hampshire, in a Martin-Baker Mk 4 seat, at 288mph. For this he was awarded the Richard Fox-Linton Memorial Prize in March 1964. He was an RAF doctor, who was head of the RAF Institute of Aviation Medicine from 1975-88, later becoming Air Vice-Marshal. This type of seat entered service as the Martin-Baker Mk.6.

During the Vietnam War was the highest number of ejections, in Martin-Baker seats, in one day - 11 on November 22 1969.

Stanley Aviation was an early American manufacturer of ejection seats; Robert Stanley (aviator) had made the first American jet flight, on October 1 1942.

The Russian Kamov Ka-50 is the first helicopter to fit an ejection seat; not many others have followed. The experimental Sikorsky S-72 had an ejection system in 1976, but this was not a production aircraft.

== Research ==
The RAF Institute of Aviation Medicine researched aviation medicine, established in 1939 by Sir Bryan Matthews and Group Captain William Kilpatrick Stewart, later commanded by Roland Winfield.

== Education ==
USAF Flight Surgeons trained at the School of Aviation Medicine.

== By country ==
=== United Kingdom ===
The RAF Medical Services was formed in April 1918; the RAF Nursing Service was formed in June 1918; the RAF Dental Branch was formed in July 1930 (later part of the Defence Dental Agency from March 1996 in Buckinghamshire, and now part of Defence Medical Services, based in Staffordshire).

The RAF centrifuge in north Hampshire opened on 17 May 1955. It cost £350,000 and was largely built by GEC.

The RAF's survival school was at RAF Thorney Island from 1955.

The Institute of Naval Aviation, in north Hampshire, tested ejection seats for naval aircraft.

The European Congress of Aviation Medicine was held in London at the Royal College of Surgeons of England from 30 August 1960.

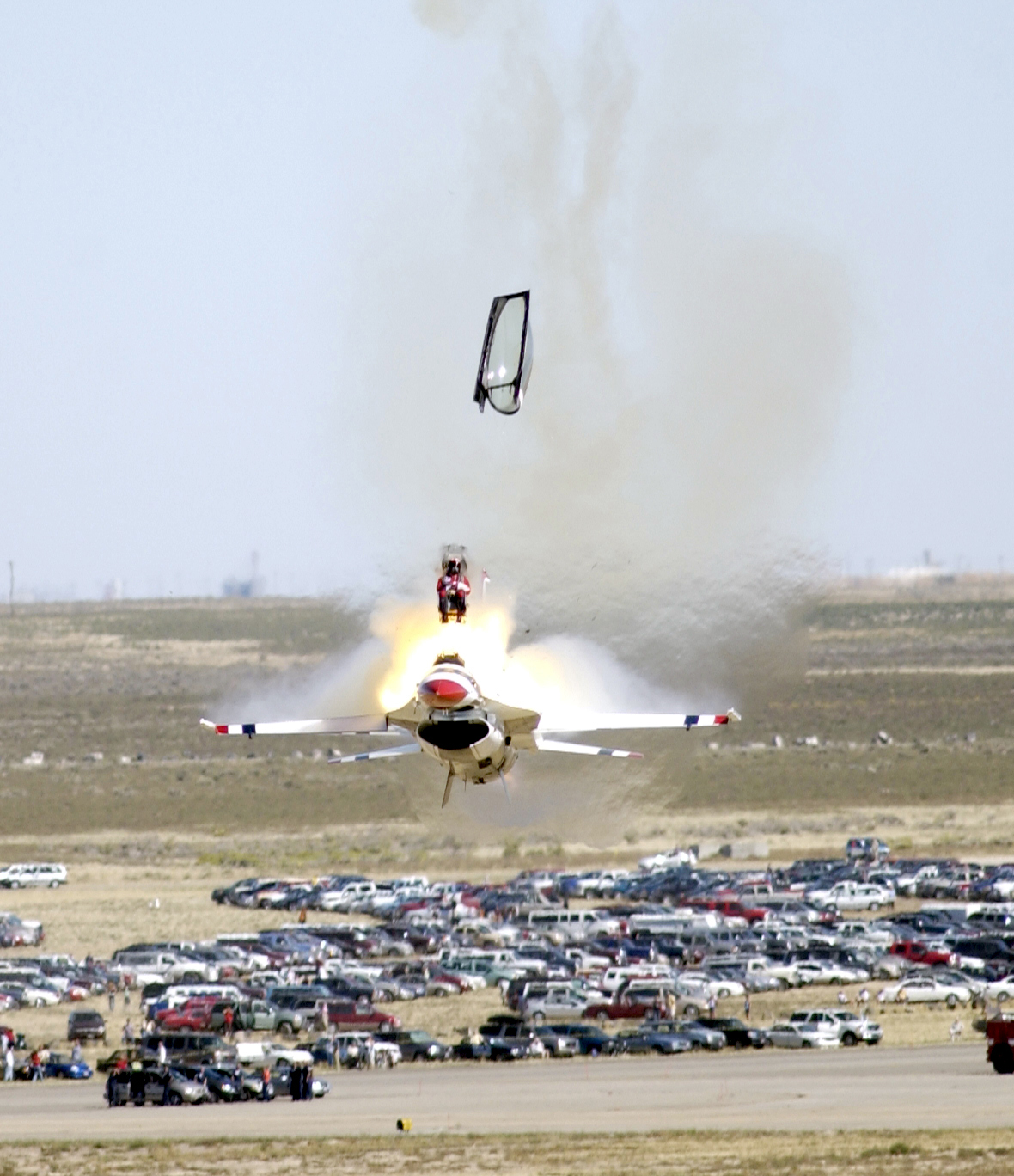
Captain Christopher Stricklin ejects from his United States Air Force Thunderbirds F-16 on 14 September 2003, one second before impact.

=== United States ===
On 15 December 1928, the Aero Medical Association of the United States was formed. The United States Air Force Medical Service was formed in 1949.

== See also ==
- Flight altitude record
- Aviation accidents and incidents
