= Claude Gordon Douglas =

British physiologist

Claude Gordon Douglas FRS (26 February 1882 in Leicester – 23 March 1963 in Radcliffe Infirmary, Oxford) was a British physiologist, known for his research on respiratory physiology and the invention of the Douglas Bag.

== Biography ==
C. Gordon Douglas was the second son of the prominent surgeon Claude Douglas. After education at Berkshire's Wellington College and at Leicester's Wyggeston Grammar School for Boys, C. Gordon Douglas matriculated in 1900 at New College, Oxford. However, in his first term he won a demyship to Magdalen College, Oxford, where he graduated in 1904 with B.A. After his B.A. he received in 1906 the research degree of BSc for work done at Oxford's physiology laboratory under the supervision of John Scott Haldane. In 1906 Douglas received a London University scholarship at Guy's Hospital. There he received M.B., B.Chir. (Oxon.) in December 1907. About six months earlier he had been elected to a fellowship at St John's College, Oxford. He held the fellowship from 1907 to 1949. He was given the higher medical qualification Doctor of Medicine in 1913.

From 1908 to 1914, Douglas did research with John Scott Haldane on human respiration. In 1910 Nathan Zuntz organised a high-altitude expedition to Tenerife in the Canary Islands; the participants included Douglas from Oxford, Joseph Barcroft from Cambridge, and Arnold Durig from Berlin. In 1911 J. S. Haldane, Douglas, Yandell Henderson, and Edward C. Schneider were the four principal members of an Anglo-American expedition to Pikes Peak in Colorado to do research on high-altitude breathing. The four principal members, but no other expedition participants, went to the summit house of Pikes Peak. Mabel Purefoy FitzGerald joined the expedition to conduct research of mining town residents at lower altitudes. Gerald B. Webb, J. Richards and J. E. Fuller also did research for the Pikes Peak expedition.

From 1914 to 1919, Douglas served in the Royal Army Medical Corps, where he attained the rank of temporary lieutenant-colonel. After the gas attacks at Wulverghem in the Second Battle of Ypres, John Scott Haldane and Douglas were rushed to a central laboratory at the British General Headquarters in Ypres. During World War I, Joseph Barcroft, John Scott Haldane, and Douglas were among the leading technical experts on gas warfare.

At Oxford, Douglas became in 1919 demonstrator in general metabolism, reader in 1937, and professor in 1942, retiring as professor in 1949 at the mandatory retirement age. However, he accepted the position of demonstrator so that he could continue teaching and retired as demonstrator in 1953.

After 1920 the work of Douglas and his research students dealt mainly with the effects of exercise on respiration, metabolism, and the circulatory system. One of his last three research students was Roger Bannister. After 1920 Douglas also devoted more time to government committee work.

C. Gordon Douglas died unmarried. His older brother James Sholto Cameron Douglas was appointed to the Joseph Hunter chair of pathology at the University of Sheffield.

== Awards and honours ==
- 1911 – Radcliffe Prize
- 1919 – CMG
- 1922 – Fellow of the Royal Society
- 1945 – Osler Memorial Medal, University of Oxford
- 1950 – Honorary Fellow of St Johns

== Selected publications ==
- Douglas, C. Gordon (1906). "A method for the determination for the volume of blood in animals". The Journal of Physiology. 33 (6): 493–505. doi:10.1113/jphysiol.1906.sp001134. PMC 1465760. PMID 16992816.
- with John Scott Haldane: Douglas CG, Haldane JS (1909). "The causes of periodic or Cheyne-Stokes breathing". The Journal of Physiology. 38 (5): 401–414. doi:10.1113/jphysiol.1909.sp001314. PMC 1533630. PMID 16992962.
- with John Scott Haldane & J. B. S. Haldane (1912). Douglas CG, Haldane JS, Haldane JB (June 1912). "The laws of combination of haemoglobin with carbon monoxide and oxygen". The Journal of Physiology. 44 (4): 275–304. doi:10.1113/jphysiol.1912.sp001517. PMC 1512793. PMID 16993128.
- with Johanne Christiansen & John Scott Haldane: Christiansen, Johanne; Douglas, C. G.; Haldane, J. S. (1914). "The absorption and dissociation of carbon dioxide by human blood". The Journal of Physiology. 48 (4): 244–271. doi:10.1113/jphysiol.1914.sp001659. PMC 1420520. PMID 16993252.
