= Adolf Loewy =

German physiologist

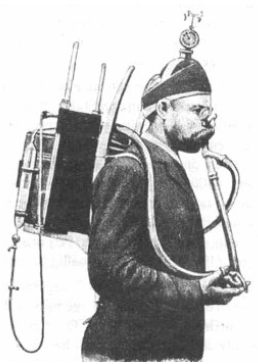
Adolf Loewy during a walk experiment.

Adolf Loewy (German spelling: Adolf Löwy; 29 June 1862 – 26 December 1937) was a German physiologist.

A native of Berlin, Loewy studied medicine at the University of Berlin as a student of Emil du Bois-Reymond and Hugo Kronecker, obtaining his medical doctorate in 1885. Later on, he was an assistant to physiologist Nathan Zuntz (1847-1920) in Berlin (Landwirtschaftliche Hochschule). In 1900 he became an assistant professor, and in 1921 was a professor and in charge of the Schweizerisches Institut für Hochgebirgsphysiologie und Tuberkuloseforschung (Swiss Institute for Altitude Physiology and Tuberculosis) at Davos.

Loewy conducted extensive research in the field of altitude physiology. This included studies performed at the Jüdischen Krankenhaus (Jewish Hospital) in Berlin, and at Capanna Regina Margherita, a research station at the top of Monte Rosa, Italy. Here he worked with Dr. Zuntz, and other renowned scientists that included Angelo Mosso (1846-1910) and Arnold Durig (1872-1961).

With Austrian physiologist Hermann von Schrötter (1870-1928), he performed pioneer research of pulmonary hemodynamics. In 1905, through the use of an endobronchial catheter, they were the first to achieve airway separation on a human subject.

In 1925 he became a member of the German Academy of Sciences Leopoldina. Many of his published works were included in Pflüger's "Archiv für die Gesammte Physiologie", in the "Archiv für Anatomie und Physiologie" and in "Virchow's Archiv".

== Selected written works ==
- Über den Einfluß der Temperatur auf die Filtration von Eiweißlösungen durch tierische Membranen. (dissertation), Berlin 1885.
- Untersuchungen über die Respiration und Zirkulation bei Änderung des Druckes und des Sauerstoffs der Luft (Studies on respiration and circulation in regards to air pressure and oxygen), Berlin, 1895.
- Untersuchungen über Blutcirculation beim Menschen, (Studies on blood circulation in humans), (1905) 197-311; with Hermann von Schrötter.
- Lehrbuch der Physiologie des Menschen. (Textbook of human physiology) Leipzig, 1909; with Nathan Zuntz.
- Über den Stoffverbrauch bei der landwirtschaftlichen Arbeit, (About energy consumption in agricultural work), Wiener Med. Wschr. 27 (1925) 1585-1590; with Hermann von Schrötter.
- Über den Energieverbrauch bei musikalischer Betätigung (Study on energy consumption of musicians), (1926), with Hermann von Schrötter.
- Physiologie des Höhenklimas. (Physiology of altitude climate), J. Springer, Berlin 1932.
