= Geppert =

Geppert is a German surname and may refer to:

- Carl Geppert (1883–1937), German actor
- Christopher Charles Geppert (born 1951), birth name of American singer Christopher Cross
- Denis Geppert (born 1976), German luger
- Edyta Geppert (born 1953), Polish singer
- Eugeniusz Geppert (1890–1979), Polish painter
- Harald Geppert (1902–1945), German mathematician and Nazi supporter, brother of Maria-Pia
- Julius Geppert (1856–1937), German pharmacologist
- Maria-Pia Geppert (1907–1997), German mathematician and biostatistician, sister of Harald
