= Kathleen Richardson, Baroness Richardson of Calow =

British life peer and Methodist leader (born 1938)

The Reverend and Right Honourable The Baroness Richardson of Calow OBE
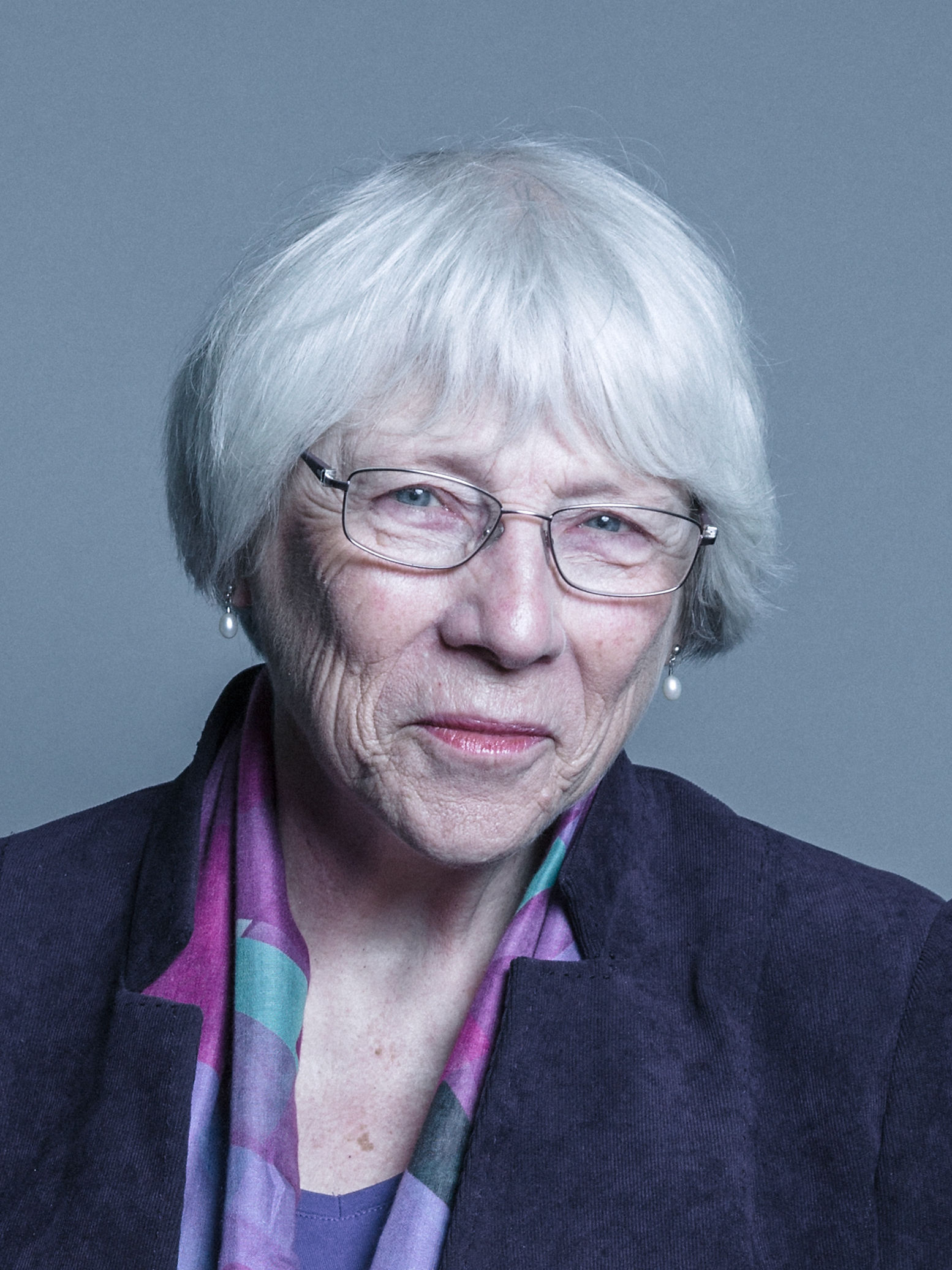

Member of the House of Lords
- Lord Temporal
- Life peerage 3 August 1998 – 20 December 2018

President of the Methodist Conference
- In office 1992–1993
- Vice President: Dr Edmund Marshall MP
- Preceded by: Ronald W. C. Hoar
- Succeeded by: Brian Beck

Personal details
- Born: Kathleen Margaret Fountain; 24 February 1938 (age 88)
- Education: St Helena School, Chesterfield
- Alma mater: Stockwell College; Deaconess College, Ilkley; Wesley House, Cambridge
- Known for: First woman president of the British Methodist Conference

Kathleen Margaret Richardson, Baroness Richardson of Calow, OBE (born 24 February 1938) is a British Methodist minister who was the first woman to serve as president of the Methodist Conference. Created a life peer in 1998, she served as a crossbench member of the House of Lords until 2018.

== Early life and education ==
Richardson was born on 24 February 1938 to Francis and Margaret Fountain. She was educated at St Helena School, an all-girls secondary school in Chesterfield, Derbyshire. She then attended Stockwell College of Education, where she completed a Certificate in Education. She trained for ordained ministry at the Deaconess College in Ilkley and at Wesley House in Cambridge.

== Ministry and activism ==
Richardson was made a deaconess in 1961 and ordained as a presbyter in 1980.

Richardson was the first woman to become a chair of district within the British Methodist Church. Later she became the first female President of the Methodist Conference (leader of the British Methodist Church and successor to John Wesley), serving a one-year term from 1992 to 1993. She was the moderator of the Free Churches Federal Council from 1995 to 1999.

As a peer, Richardson was active in the House of Lords from 3 August 1998 until her retirement on 20 December 2018. She sat on the crossbenches and was a member of the Committee On Religious Offence.

She is a patron of Methodist Homes (MHA). Richardson is also a patron of a right to die organization, My Death, My Decision. It wants to see a more compassionate approach to dying in the UK, including giving people the legal right to a medically assisted death if that is their persistent wish

== Personal life ==
In 1964, she married Ian David Godfrey Richardson. Together they have had three daughters.

== Honours ==
In the 1996 New Year Honours, Richardson was appointed Officer of the Order of the British Empire (OBE) "for services to the Methodist community". On 3 August 1998 she was made a life peer as Baroness Richardson of Calow, of Calow in the County of Derbyshire.
