= Albert Frankel =

Albert Frankel may refer to:

- Albert Frankel (architect) (1868–1957), Swedish-American architect
- Albert Fraenkel (1864–1938), German physician
- Albert Fraenkel (1848–1916), German physician
