= Mabel Purefoy FitzGerald =

British physiologist

- Born: 3 August 1872; Preston Candover, Hampshire, England
- Died: 24 August 1973 (aged 101); Oxford, England
- Scientific career
- Fields: Physiology, pathology

Mabel Purefoy FitzGerald (3 August 1872 – 24 August 1973) was a British physiologist and clinical pathologist best known for her work on the physiology of respiration. She became the second female member of the American Physiological Society in 1913. She worked with many great scientists during her research like William Osler, John Scott Haldane, Charles Scott Sherrington, and many more in a plethora of fields like pathology, immunology, gastroenterology, respiratory physiology and neurobiology. FitzGerald published a total of eleven papers about her work.

== Early life and education ==
Mabel FitzGerald was born in 1872 in Preston Candover near Basingstoke. She was educated at home, as was typical for upper and middle class girls in her time. In 1895, both her parents died and Mabel moved to Oxford with her sisters in 1896. She began to teach herself chemistry and biology from books, as well as attending classes at Oxford University between 1896 and 1899, even though women were not yet allowed to receive degrees. She continued her studies at the University of Copenhagen, Cambridge University and New York University.

In 1887, Sir Francis Gotch granted Mabel permission to attend the Honor School of Physiology, where she became the first female student in medical school at the University of Oxford. She attended her first scientific presentation in 1902 at the inauguration of Statens Serum Institut in Copenhagen alongside future Nobel prize winners Paul Ehrlich and Robert Koch. In 1904, while working alongside John Scott Haldane to determine the role of carbon dioxide in disease, she met William Osler, the father of modern medicine. Mabel was invited by Osler to help him establish a medical training program at Radcliff Infirmary. As a couple years passed, Mabel found herself as a research fellow at the new Rockefeller Institute in New York City. Once there, she befriended Canadian fellow Maud Menten and both relocated to the University of Toronto. There, she modified the histological method and proved the origin of hydrochloric acid in the parietal cells of gastric tubules. After completing her research, Mabel returned to New York in hopes of earning her medical degree from Oxford. Her 1500 hours in the medical curriculum and three years of clinical training with Osler proved to be insufficient as the University of Oxford did not award medical degrees to women at the time. The New York Board of Regents decided that Mabel should attend an American high school due to them claiming Mabel's extensive English education was insufficient for her to receive her medical degree. Mabel began high school in New York City.

Mabel is noted with creating the motto, "If you can't get what you like, like what you get", within her diaries a result of career experience and motivation to reach her goals. It was Mabel's hard work, dedication, and perseverance towards her education and early career that allowed her to produce multiple publications and develop friendships with her mentors.

== Work ==
FitzGerald began to work with Francis Gotch at the physiology department in Oxford. Gotch also helped her get a paper published by the Royal Society in 1906.

From 1904, FitzGerald worked with John Scott Haldane on measuring the carbon dioxide tension in the human lung. After studying the differences between healthy and ill people, the two continued to investigate the effects of altitude on respiration; it is this work that they are most famous for. FitzGerald's observations of the effects of full altitude acclimatization on carbon dioxide tension and haemoglobin remain accepted today.

In 1907, FitzGerald was awarded a Rockefeller travelling scholarship, which allowed her to work in New York and Toronto.

FitzGerald is perhaps most known for her work with John Scott Haldane with regards to respiratory physiology. In 1911 she participated, along with C. Gordon Douglas and several other scientists, in an expedition within unruly mining towns of the Colorado Rockies. This expedition was led by John Scott Haldane with the goal to investigate human respiration at high altitudes. During the Pikes Peak's Expedition, FitzGerald was the only woman on the trip. She was not allowed to travel with the men however, but was able to make a lot of measurements as she traveled around to the high altitude areas and mining towns in Colorado with her mule. She went to altitudes of 6000 to 12500 feet in the mountains for data in areas like hemoglobin and alveolar air. Her patients included herself and the workers and civilians of the towns she traveled to. Her findings heavily contributed to the world's knowledge on respiration at higher altitudes like lower PaCO_{2}, greater ventilation, and elevated hemoglobin levels. She recognized that these were the simple, basic, but necessary changes the brain does to accommodate for the environment. Even after all the data she had discovered, she was disappointed for now finding data from sea level to 5000 feet.

As a result of self-criticism for not acquiring data from sea level to 5000 feet, she ventured to North Carolina in the summer 1913 to confirm her results from sea level to 5000 feet altitudes. Mabel made measurements on the breathing and the blood of a total of 43 adult residents chosen from three different locations in the Southern Appalachian chain. She was delighted to have her data reveal the same changes in PaCO_{2} and hemoglobin levels as she found at higher elevations. However, she recognized that her own PaCO_{2} values did not change with minor changes in altitude, but her hemoglobin levels rose. This result indicated that PaCO_{2} was not responsible for the rise in hemoglobin. Mabel was close to hypothesizing the presence of an physiological oxygen sensor within the body, but after 1915 she surprisingly stopped publishing scientific papers.

== Later life ==
As a woman who was still being disrespected by the many societal roles of the time, she was very frustrated with the Board of Regents continuously making it hard for her to teach and do research. Until in 1915, Jamie Richie, the founder of the Pathological Society and the Journal of Pathology and Bacteriology who also mentored her, sent her a message. He wanted her to come down to Edinburgh Infirmary to be a clinical pathologist. She left as quickly as she could to replace the doctor that had left for the war. As she arrived in Scotland, she continued her attempt to get into medical school and get her degree. She applied to the London College of Physicians and Surgeons. This sadly never happened as they told her that it would not be plausible to work as a clinical pathologist and go to medical school. She remained as a teacher at the University of Edinburgh Medical School until 1930. She did not publish any more papers and remained out of contact with the physiology community even after her return to Oxford in 1930.

In 1961, on the centenary of Haldane's birth, her work was rediscovered. In 1972, at 100 years old, she received an honorary MA from Oxford University, 75 years after she had attended classes there, and an apology from the Vice Chancellor, Sir Alan Bullock. She was also made a member of The Physiological Society.

She lived her life proving that women did not have to accept the gender roles of her time and received much scrutiny for the path she took. FitzGerald never had any bad feelings for the people tried to put her down and stop her from changing the ways for women. She only wanted the world to know that "women can do as well men",

== Papers ==
Her papers (Nachlass) are held by Bodleian Library.

After her death R. W. Torrance was asked to look at her scientific apparatus and papers in the house at 12 Crick Road. ... The apparatus formed the tools of her trade as a physiologist studying acclimatizations at high altitude, including an altimeter, haemoglobinometer, haemocytometer, and the two hemi-Haldane apparatuses she had used in North Carolina. There was a trunk full of family diaries including her own and many letters including some about scientific work from Haldane, Douglas, Gotch, Mann, Henderson and Sherrington. This material is now in the Bodleian Library. There was also correspondence with Osler for whom she collected medical books.

== Selected publications ==
- FitzGerald, MP; Haldane, JS (1905). "The normal alveolar carbonic acid pressure in man" (PDF). The Journal of Physiology. 32 (5–6): 486–494. doi:10.1113/jphysiol.1905.sp001095. PMC 1465735. PMID 16992788.
- FitzGerald, MP (1913). "The changes in the breathing and the blood at various high altitudes". Philosophical Transactions of the Royal Society of London. Series B, Containing Papers of a Biological Character. 203 (294–302): 351–371. doi:10.1098/rstb.1913.0008.
- FitzGerald, MP (1914). "Further observations on the changes in the breathing and the blood at various high altitudes". Proceedings of the Royal Society of London. Series B, Containing Papers of a Biological Character. 88 (602): 248–258. Bibcode:1914RSPSB..88..248P. doi:10.1098/rspb.1914.0072.
