= St Helena School =

St Helena School may refer to:

- St Helena School, Colchester
- Chesterfield St Helena School

== See also ==
- Saint Helena (disambiguation)
