= Chesterfield Royal Hospital NHS Foundation Trust =

Coordinates: 53.2363°N 1.4001°W

- Type: NHS hospital trust
- Established: 1 January 2005
- Region served: NHS
- Hospitals: Chesterfield Royal Hospital
- Chair: Mahmud Nawaz
- Chief executive: Dr. Hal Spencer

Chesterfield Royal Hospital NHS Foundation Trust is an NHS Foundation Trust providing health services at the Chesterfield Royal Hospital and at other facilities in Chesterfield, Derbyshire, England.

== History ==
The Trust was established as Chesterfield and North Derbyshire Royal Hospital NHS Trust on 4 November 1992. It achieved foundation trust status in January 2005 renaming to Chesterfield Royal Hospital NHS Foundation Trust.

== Performance ==
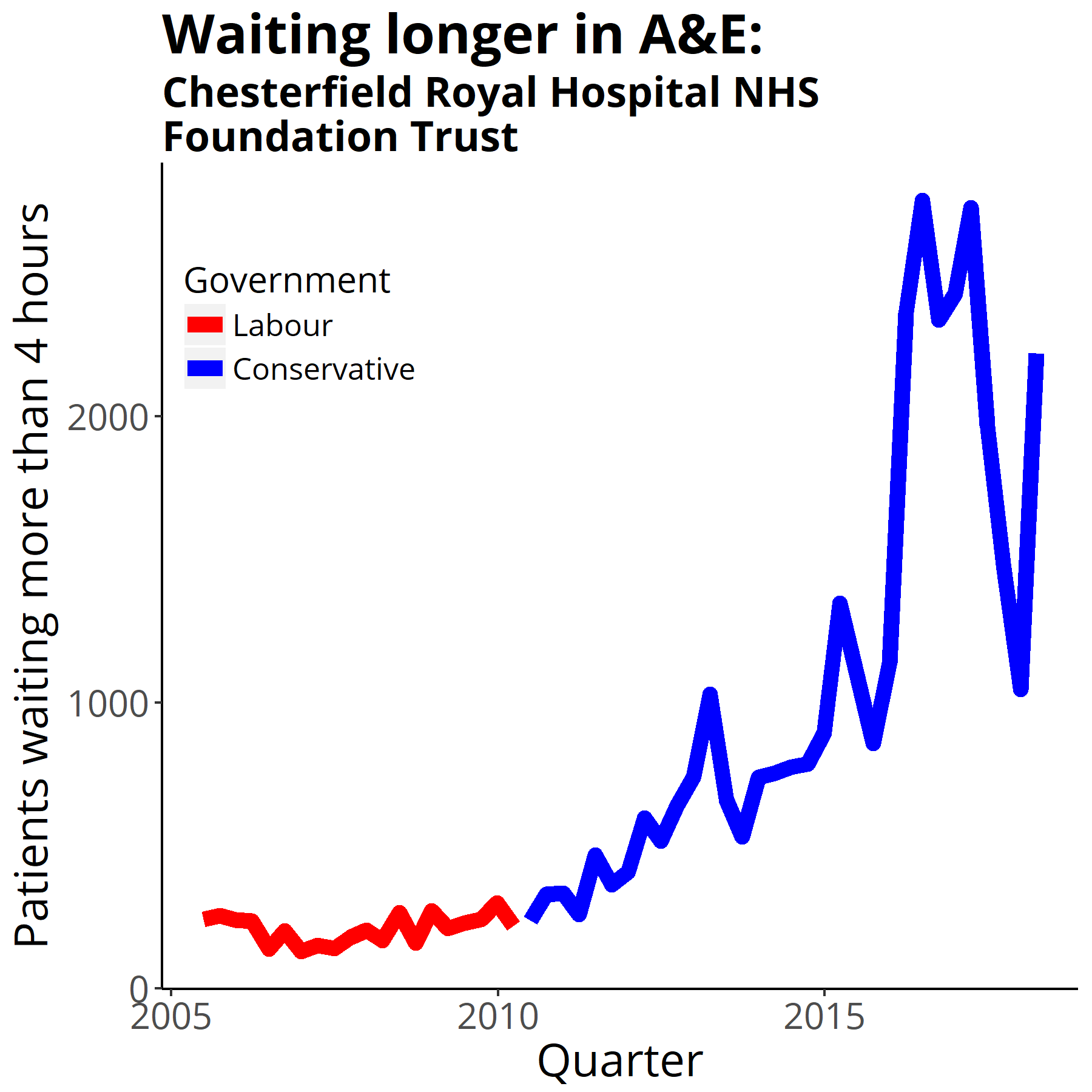
Four-hour target in the emergency department quarterly figures from NHS England Data from https://www.england.nhs.uk/statistics/statistical-work-areas/ae-waiting-times-and-activity/

In August 2013 inspectors from the Care Quality Commission found some patients were not being treated with respect, nutritional needs were not being met and records were not being completed. They also highlighted a lack of choice of suitable food and drink for patients – and a previous inspection found national standards of nutritional needs were not being met.

The Trust developed a scheme where vulnerable patients could order cost-price 'Home From Hospital' food packs through the discharge lounge which was featured by the BBC in "Operation Hospital Food". "The type of patient that might use these packs doesn't normally have a big appetite - they just need something simple, which is why I suggested the basics - such as bread, cheese, milk and butter. That way they can make themselves a cheese sandwich, cheese on toast, bread and butter, something very easy to have with a cup of tea. The hope is that it will reduce the risk of a patient not eating and drinking properly, one of the potential reasons for early re-admission to hospital. It's not rocket science, but as far as we know, it's not been done anywhere else in the NHS."

Basil Ward is used for patients needing to be moved to other types of care outside acute setting. It is designed for 14 patients but is accommodating 28. Visits by the Clinical Commissioning Group and the trust's governors in 2014 found it to be overcrowded with staffing problems and a failure to report incidents.

In May 2015 after the collapse of the Holywell Medical Group the trust's primary care branch, Royal Primary Care, took over the running of GP services to all patients registered with the practice in Chesterfield and Staveley. By 2016 it had taken on four practices, with more than 30,000 patients in total.

On 17 May 2017, Chesterfield Royal Hospital was awarded a GOOD rating from the Care Quality Commission.

In a subsequent inspection carried out on 6 February 2024 and published on 26 July 2024, the hospital was again rated Good overall, with Good ratings for being Safe, Caring, Responsive and Well-led, and a rating of Requires improvement for being Effective.

It won the title of Large Employer of the Year at the East Midlands finals of the National Apprenticeship Awards in 2022.

== See also ==
- List of hospitals in England
- List of NHS trusts
