= Pflügers Archiv: European Journal of Physiology =

- Discipline: Physiology
- Language: English, German
- Edited by: Bernd Nilius

Publication details
- Former names: Pflüger's Archiv für die gesamte Physiologie des Menschen und der Tiere; Archiv für die gesamte Physiologie des Menschen und der Tiere
- History: Archiv für die gesamte Physiologie des Menschen und der Tiere (1868–1910); Pflüger's Archiv für die gesamte Physiologie des Menschen und der Tiere (1910–1968); Pflügers Archiv: European Journal of Physiology (1968–present)
- Publisher: Springer (Germany)
- Frequency: Monthly
- Open access: By author payment
- Impact factor: 2.765 (2017)

Standard abbreviations
- ISO 4: Pflügers Arch.

Indexing
- ISSN: 0031-6768 (print); 1432-2013 (web)

Pflügers Archiv: European Journal of Physiology is a peer-reviewed scientific journal in the field of physiology. A continuation of a journal founded in 1868 by the German physiologist, Eduard Friedrich Wilhelm Pflüger, Pflügers Archiv (German: [ˈpflyːɡɐs aʁˈçiːf]) is the oldest physiological journal. Pflügers Archiv is currently published by Springer, with 11 issues per year.

The journal publishes molecular and cellular studies across the physiological sciences; topics include the physiology of the heart, muscle and sensory systems, transport physiology, neuroscience, signalling, ion channels and receptors. It aims to publish "innovative work that focuses on mechanistic insight into basic physiological functions".

== History ==
Pflügers Archiv is the oldest physiological journal. It was founded in 1868 by the German physiologist, Eduard Friedrich Wilhelm Pflüger, under the title Archiv für die gesamte Physiologie des Menschen und der Tiere. It was published in German. The first issue of the journal contains 26 articles, with contributors including Hermann Rudolph Aubert, Julius Bernstein, Johann Nepomuk Czermak, Franciscus Donders, Sigmund Exner, Siegmund Mayer, Peter Ludvig Panum, William Thierry Preyer, Salomon Stricker, Hermann von Helmholtz, Friedrich Wilhelm Zahn and Nathan Zuntz. It includes the earliest accurate description of the action potential, by Julius Bernstein, using an apparatus called a "differential rheotome".

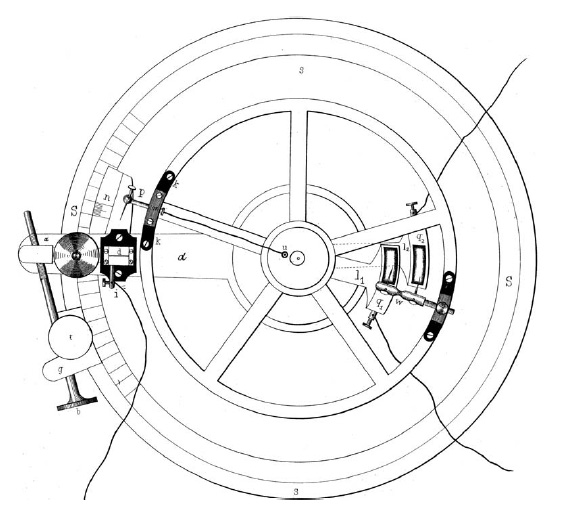
Differential rheotome, from a diagram in Bernstein's paper

The journal was mainly published annually until 1874; there were two or three volumes annually in 1874–1890. From 1891, the volume was split into issues, with five or six issues per volume, and initially three volumes published a year; volumes often did not commence in January. The frequency of volumes increased, with five volumes in 1909.

In 1910, after Pflüger's death, the journal was retitled Pflüger's Archiv für die gesamte Physiologie des Menschen und der Tiere (ISSN 0365-267X). It was published by Springer in German, with some English translations of summaries. Several other German physiology journals merged into the publication: in 1919, Archiv für Anatomie und Physiologie. Physiologische Abt (ISSN 0365-5806), which had been founded in 1877; in 1921, Zentralblatt für Physiologie, which had been founded in 1887; and also Archiv für Physiologie. Publication was interrupted in 1945–46. The journal assumed its current title in 1968. It was published in a mixture of English, French and German until 1997, when it became an exclusively English-language journal.

Other key developments published in the journal include Bernstein's explanation of the resting membrane potential; the demonstration of the requirement for sodium ions for nervous excitation, and the prediction of the existence of a lipid cell membrane by Ernest Overton; and early descriptions of conductance in excitable tissues by Ludwig Hermann. In 1978, Erwin Neher and Bert Sakmann published the first description of the patch clamp technique in Pflügers Archiv.

== Modern journal ==
Pflügers Archiv's 2009 impact factor is 3.158. It is also indexed in Academic OneFile, BIOSIS Previews, CAB Abstracts, Chemical Abstracts, Current Contents/Life Sciences, EBSCO, EMBASE, MEDLINE, ProQuest and Scopus, among other services. All issues are available online as PDFs, with text versions additionally available from 2000; access is by subscription. Additionally, authors can pay to have their articles released freely online as part of a hybrid open access scheme.

As of 2010, the editor in chief is Bernd Nilius (Katholieke Universiteit Leuven, Belgium).

== Key papers ==
- Bernstein, J. (1868), "Ueber den zeitlichen Verlauf der negativen Schwankung des Nervenstroms", Archiv für die gesamte Physiologie des Menschen und der Tiere (in German), 1: 173–207, doi:10.1007/BF01640316, S2CID 32435163
- Bernstein, J. (1902), "Untersuchungen zur Thermodynamik der bioelektrischen Ströme", Archiv für die gesamte Physiologie des Menschen und der Tiere (in German), 92 (10–12): 521–562, doi:10.1007/BF01790181, S2CID 33229139
- Neher, E; Sakmann B.; Steinbach, J. H. (1978), "The Extracellular Patch Clamp: A Method for Resolving Currents Through Individual Open Channels in Biological Membranes", Pflügers Archiv, 375 (2): 219–228, doi:10.1007/BF00584247, PMID 567789, S2CID 8035857
