= Listed buildings in Calow =

Calow is a civil parish in the North East Derbyshire district of Derbyshire, England. The parish contains three listed buildings that are recorded in the National Heritage List for England. All the listed buildings are designated at Grade II, the lowest of the three grades, which is applied to "buildings of national importance and special interest". The parish contains the village of Calow, and the listed buildings consist of a farmhouse, a church, and a war memorial.

== Buildings ==
| Name and location | Photograph | Date | Notes |
|---|---|---|---|
| Lodge House; 53.23347°N 1.37708°W | — | Early 19th century | A farmhouse in sandstone with a hipped slate roof. There are two storeys and three bays. The central doorway has a semicircular fanlight, imposts, and a keystone, and the windows are sashes. |
| St Peter's Church; 53.23409°N 1.39046°W | | 1869 | The church was designed by Samuel Rollinson, and the steeple was added in 1887. The church is built in sandstone with gritstone dressings and a tile roof. It consists of a nave, a chancel with a polygonal apse and a north vestry, a later vestry linked to the north side of the nave, and a southwest steeple. The steeple has a tower that is square at the base with angle buttresses, a south doorway with a pointed arch, and it broaches to become octagonal at the bell stage. The tower is surmounted by an octagonal spire with lucarnes. |
| War memorial 53.23439°N 1.38076°W | | c. 1921 | The war memorial is in Eastwood Park, and is in sandstone. It consists of a wheel-head Celtic cross, on a tapering square plinth, and on a stepped base. On the arms of the cross is a knot-work design. There are two bronze plaques with inscriptions and the names of those lost in the two World Wars. The First World War plaque is on the plinth, and the one for the Second World War is on the base of the shaft. |
