= Eduard Friedrich Wilhelm Pflüger =

German physiologist (1829–1910)

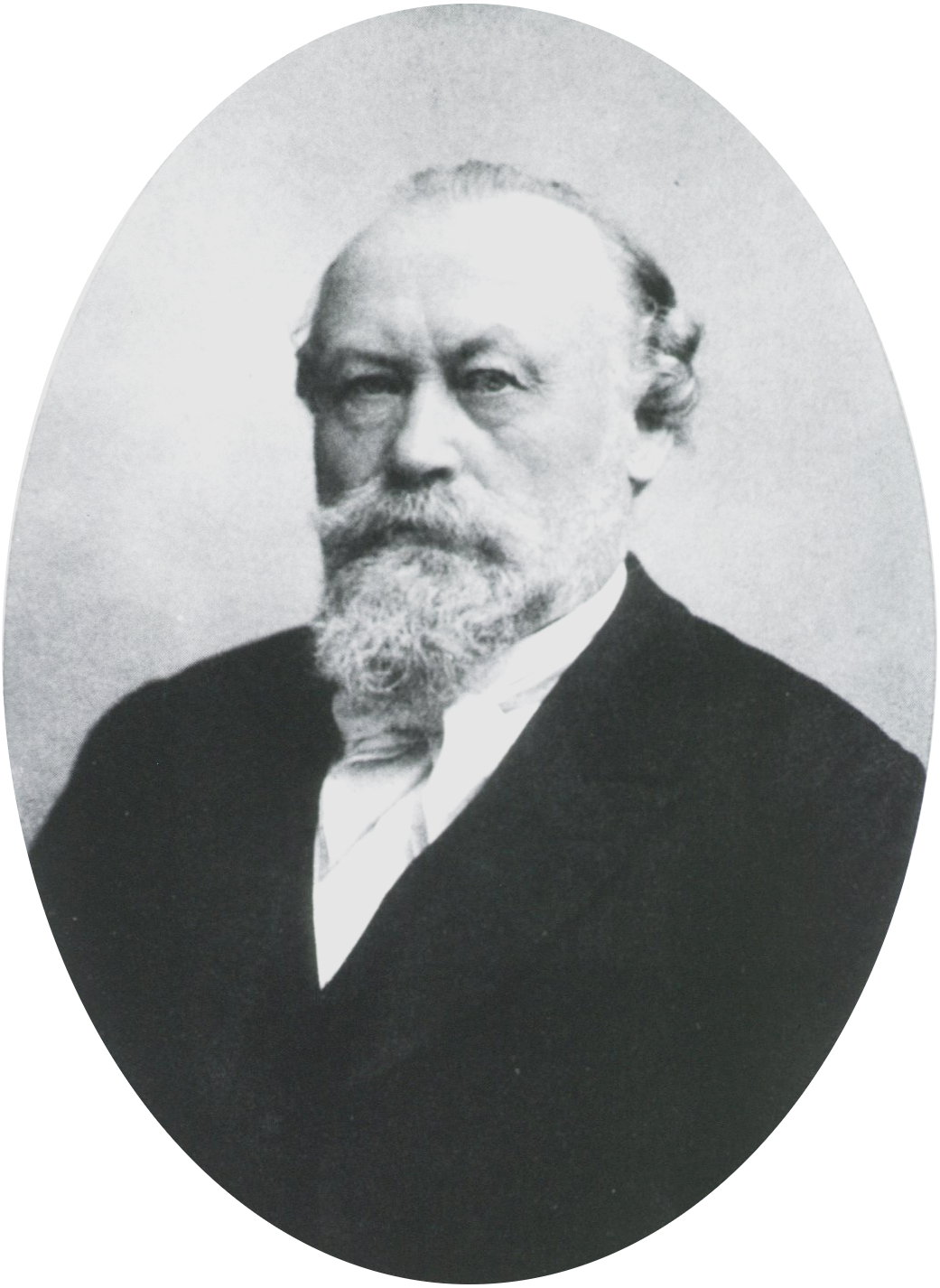
- Born: 7 June 1829; Hanau, Hesse, Germany
- Died: 16 March 1910 (aged 80); Bonn, Germany
- Education: University of Berlin, University of Marburg (doctorate 1853)
- Known for: Pflüger's law on electrical stimulation and muscular contraction.
- Scientific career
- Fields: Physiology
- Workplaces: University of Bonn

Eduard Friedrich Wilhelm Pflüger FRSFor HFRSE (German: [ˈpflyːɡɐ]; 7 June 1829 – 16 March 1910) was a 19th-century German physiologist.

== Life ==
He was born in Hanau on 7 June 1829.

After initially studying law at Berlin University, he transferred to study medicine, also doing further study at the University of Marburg, earning his doctorate in 1853. While in Berlin he worked as an assistant to Emil du Bois-Reymond (1818–1896). In 1859 he became a professor of physiology at the University of Bonn, where he remained for the rest of his career. Among his students in Bonn were physiologist Nathan Zuntz (1847–1920) and chemist Hugo Paul Friedrich Schulz (1853–1932).

Pflüger made contributions in many aspects of physiology, including embryological physiology, respiratory physiology, sensory physiology and electrophysiology. The eponymous "Pflüger's law" (Pflüger's Zuckungsgesetz) is the result of his research on electrical stimulation and its correlation to muscular contraction. In 1868 he founded Archiv für die gesammte Physiologie des Menschen und der Thiere (now Pflügers Archiv: European Journal of Physiology), a publication that became the most influential journal of physiology in Germany.

He conducted research on intestinal peristalsis, the sensory functions of the spinal cord, the physiology of electrotonus, on protein metabolism and on regulation of body temperature by the nervous system, et al. In one of his more important studies, he proved that respiration takes place in the peripheral tissue rather than in the blood. He also performed extensive research of glycogen, and is credited with the creation of several physiological instruments.

He died in Bonn on 16 March 1910.

== Selected publications ==
- Die sensorischen Functionen des Rückenmarks der wirbelthiere (The sensory functions of the spinal cord of vertebrate animals), 1853.
- Experimentalbeitrag zur Theorie der Hemmungsnerven (Experimental contribution to the theory of neural inhibition) In: Archiv für Anatomie, Physiologie und wissenschaftliche Medicin. 1859, S. 13–29.
- Ueber ein neues Reagens zur Darstellung des Axencylinders (About a new reagent for the visualization of axon-cylinders) In: Archiv für Anatomie, Physiologie und wissenschaftliche Medicin. 1859, S. 132.
- Ueber die Ursache des Oeffnungstetanus (On the cause of "oeffnungtetanus") In: Archiv für Anatomie, Physiologie und wissenschaftliche Medicin. 1859, S. 133–148.
- Ueber die Bewegungen der Ovarien (On the movements of the ovaries) In: Archiv für Anatomie, Physiologie und wissenschaftliche Medicin. 1859, S. 30–32.
- Uber die Eierstöcke der Säugetiere und des Menschen (On the ovaries of mammals and humans), 1863.
- Uber die Kohlemsäure des Blute (On carbon dioxide in the blood), 1864.
- Bemerkungen zur Physiologie des centralen Nervensystems (Remarks on the physiology of the central nervous system) In: Archiv für die gesammte Physiologie des Menschen und der Thiere. Band 15, 1877, S. 150–152.
- Wesen und Aufgaben der Physiologie (The nature and role of physiology), 1878.
- Lehrbuch der Psychiatrie für Aerzte und Studirende (Textbook of psychiatry for doctors and students), 1883.
- Neurasthenie (Nervenschwäche), ihr Wesen, ihre Bedeutung und Behandlung vom anatomisch-physiologischen Standpunkte für Aerzte und Studirende (Neurasthenia, its essence, significance and treatment from an anatomic-physiological standpoint for doctors and students), 1885.
- Die Quelle der Muskelkraft (The source of muscle strength), 1891.
- Das Glykogen und seine Beziehungen zur Zuckerkrankheit (Glycogen and its relationship to diabetes), 1905.
