= Albert Fraenkel (1848–1916) =

German physician (1848–1916)

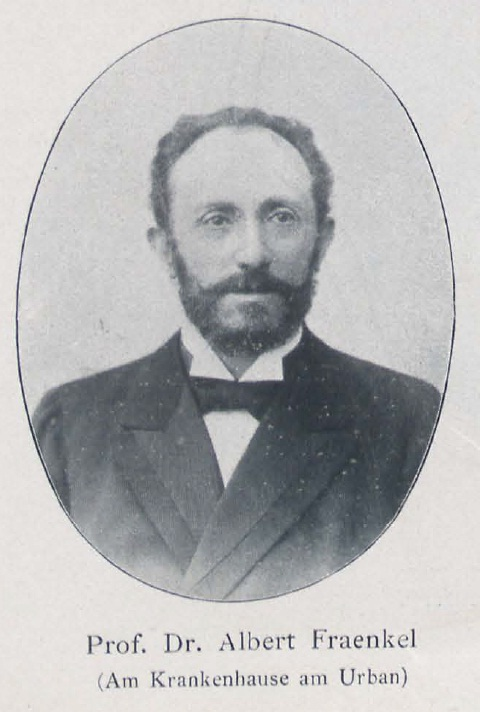
Albert Fraenkel

Albert Fraenkel (10 March 1848, Frankfurt/Oder – 6 July 1916, Berlin) was a German physician.

He received his education at the gymnasium (school) of his native town and at the University of Berlin, whence he graduated as doctor of medicine in 1870. After having been assistant to Adolph Kussmaul, Ludwig Traube and Ernst Viktor von Leyden in Berlin, he settled in the German capital, becoming a lecturer at the university in 1877. He was a nephew of Traube, the third volume of whose "Gesammelte Beiträge zur Pathologic und Physiologic" he published in 1878. Fraenkel received the title of professor in 1884, and became director of the medical department of the Am Urbanplatz Hospital, Berlin.

== Literary works ==
Following in the footsteps of Traube, Fraenkel's first works were on experimental pathology, among them being the following:

- "Ueber den Einfluss der Verminderten Sauerstoffzufuhr zu den Geweben auf den Eiweiszerfall ()", in Virchow's "Archiv," vol. lxvii;
- with Ernst Viktor von Leyden, "Ueber die Grösse der Kohlensäureausscheidung im Fieber", ib. vol. lxxvi;
- with J. Geppert, "Ueber die Wirkungen der Verdünnten Luft auf den Organismus", Berlin, 1873;

After becoming lecturer at the university his field of special research was the diseases of the lungs and the heart. Of his essays and works in this area may be mentioned:

- "Bakteriologische Mittheilungen über die Actiologie der Pneumonie", in "Zeitsch. für Klinische Medizin", vols. x. and xi., in which essay he was the first to expound the theory of the micrococci of pneumonia;
- "Pathologie und Therapie der Krankheiten des Respirationsapparates", 1890-1902;
- "Ueber Septikopyümische Erkrankungen, Speciell Akute Dermatomyositis", 1894;
- "Ueber Akute Leukämie", 1895;
- "Zur Pathologischen Anatomie des Bronchialasthma", 1898.
- His writings have appeared in the "Charité Annalen", "Zeitschrift für Klinische Medizin", "Berliner Klinische Wochenschrift", and "Deutsche Medizinische Wochenschrift".
