= Chesterfield Royal Hospital =

- Chesterfield Royal Hospital NHS Foundation Trust
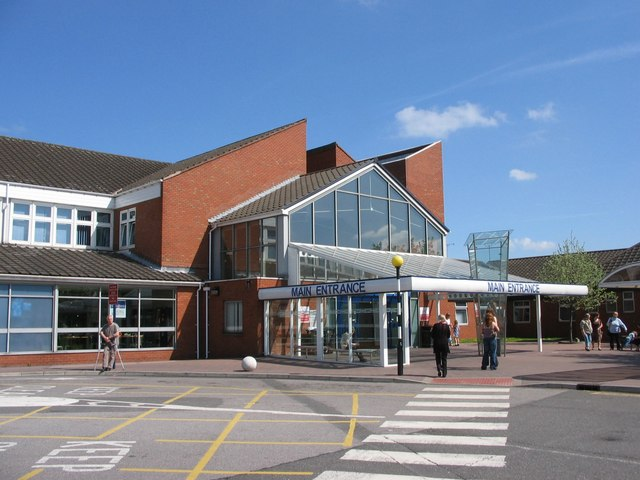
- Chesterfield Royal Hospital

- Shown in Derbyshire

Geography
- Location: Chesterfield, Derbyshire, England, United Kingdom
- Coordinates: 53.2359°N 1.3969°W

Organisation
- Care system: Public NHS
- Type: General

Services
- Emergency department: Yes Accident & Emergency

History
- Founded: 1984

Links
- Website: www.chesterfieldroyal.nhs.uk
- Lists: Hospitals in England

Chesterfield Royal Hospital is an acute general hospital in Chesterfield, Derbyshire. It is managed by the Chesterfield Royal Hospital NHS Foundation Trust.

== History ==
The hospital has its origins in a dispensary established in a small house in St. Mary's Gate in 1854. The foundation stone for a new purpose-built facility was laid by the Marquis of Hartington on the site of Durrant Hall in 1859. The new hospital was officially opened in 1860: this facility became the Chesterfield Royal Hospital in 1918 and a nurses' home was added in 1919 before it joined the National Health Service in 1948.

A new modern hospital at Calow opened to patients on 29 April 1984. It was officially opened by the Queen in 1985 and was extended to include a maternity and gynaecology unit in 1989.

The National Gardens Scheme Macmillan Unit opened in November 2018. The two-storey building has 21 chemotherapy treatment chairs, two treatment beds, and three treatment rooms. It was built by Vinci Construction.

== Notable births ==
People born at the hospital include Thomas Raymond Latimer, a professional wrestler currently based in the United States where he performs under the ring name Bram.
