= Chesterfield St Helena School =

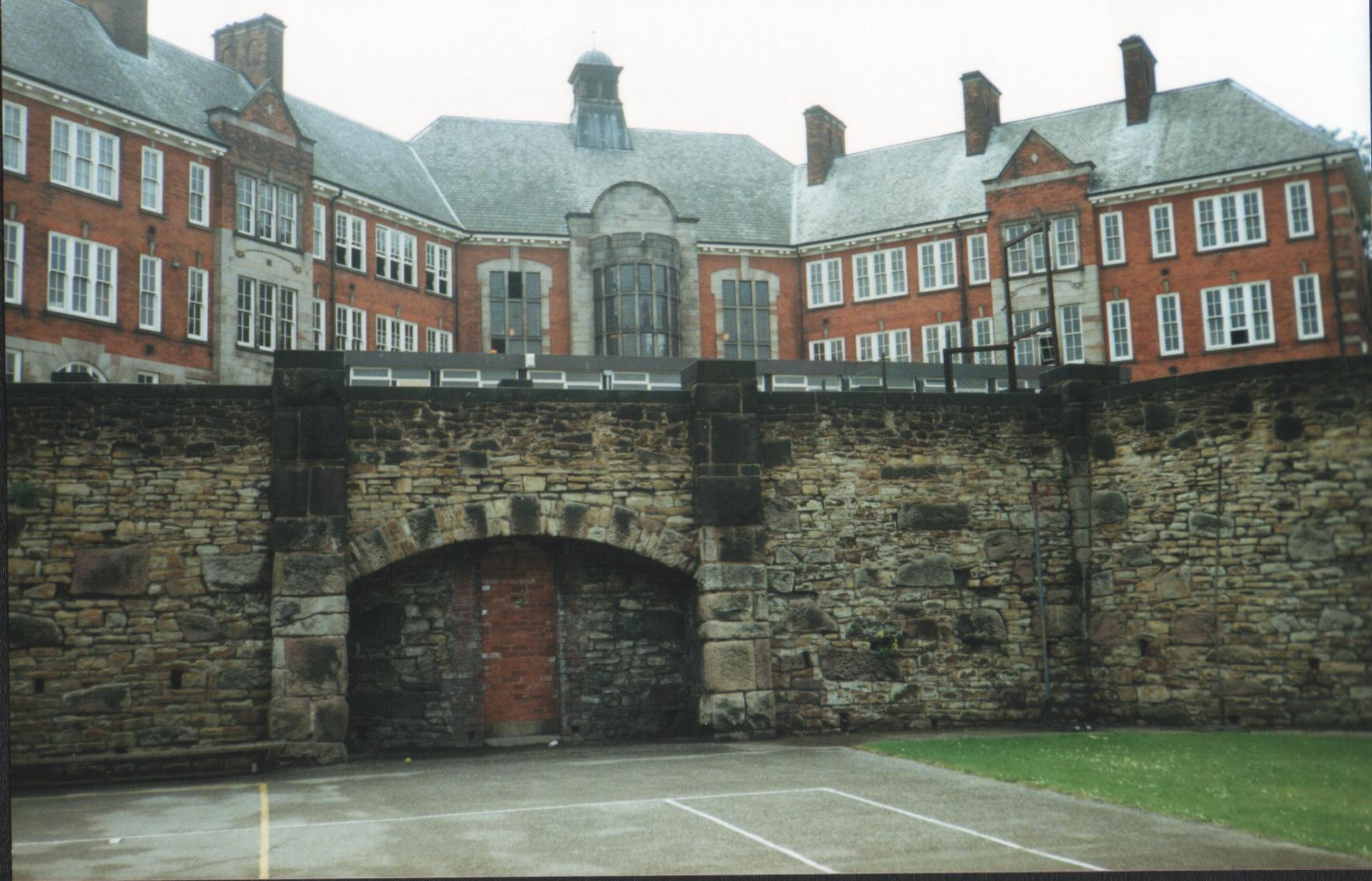

Location
- Sheffield Road; Chesterfield, Derbyshire; England; 53.239722°N 1.426389°W

Information
- Type: Former Girls High School
- Established: 1892
- Closed: 1991
- Gender: Female
- Age: 11 to 18

Chesterfield St Helena School, also known as Chesterfield Girls' Grammar School and St Helena School, Chesterfield, was an all-girls high school in Chesterfield, Derbyshire, teaching 11- to 18-year-old girls between 1892 and its closure in 1991. The building now serves as an Area Education Office for Derbyshire County Council.

== History ==
=== The early days ===
In 1882, education for girls was still considered to be of minimal importance. Fortunately for the young female residents of Chesterfield, a group of influential businessmen, satisfied with the arrangements for the education of their sons, decided they wanted to improve the opportunities for their daughters. As a result of this, a school was set up in the Congregational Schoolroom under the supervision of Miss Walton. The school seems to have thrived, for a report of a Harvest Festival held in October 1889 states that it was held in the presence of about a hundred parents and friends. The schoolroom was appropriately decorated for the occasion and an interesting programme of vocal and instrumental music and recitations was performed. Prizes were presented by the Mayor, Mr. B. Douglas Esq. The Mayor proposed the vote of thanks to Miss Walton and this was seconded by Mr. Voules, Headmaster of the Grammar School.

The school continued to minister to the educational needs of the young ladies of the town until 1892 when the following advertisement appeared:-

CHESTERFIELD HIGH SCHOOL FOR GIRLS

EAST BANK, SHEFFIELD ROAD.

Miss Walton having transferred her kindergarten and school it will be re-opened in September next as the High School for Girls by Miss Wilkes (Higher Cambridge Honours Certificate) and Miss Stevens (late student of Newnham College Cambridge) mistresses of long experience in High School teaching. For particulars apply Miss Wilkes, Northfield, near Brimington, or Miss Walton, Walton Grove, Chesterfield. The kindergarten will remain under the charge of Miss Walton.

So the Chesterfield Girls' Grammar School came into being. The original school building, located at East Bank, Sheffield Road, Chesterfield, still exists today and is now used as offices.

The school was to remain at East Bank until 1911, and during that period secured a reputation for providing a good all-round education for its pupils. In the Midland Railway Guide of 1899 a full page advertisement was devoted to include a sufficient variety of subjects to ensure proper development of all the faculties of the pupils.

By 1904 there were 112 pupils in the school and the number increased each term. The joint headship between Miss Wilkes and Miss Stevens came to an end when the County Council took over the responsibility for the running of the school in 1906. Miss Wilkes was designated Head Mistress and Miss Stevens Second Mistress. It was from this time that official records were kept and from these it would seem that, besides Miss Wilkes and Miss Stevens, there were nine other teachers in the school.

Plans were proposed for the erection of a new, purpose built school on vacant ground opposite East Bank. Before these plans could come to fruition, the school had increased to such an extent that number 68, St Helens Street was purchased to house the kindergarten and two lower forms of the school. Intake age was 4 years for both boys and girls, the boys leaving at the age of 11 to continue their education mainly at the local Grammar School.

In 1909, plans for the new school buildings were passed and work started, though it was not an easy site to develop owing to the severe slope of the land on the east side down to Infirmary Road. The best materials were used, local brick from the Wasps Nest Brick Works in Brampton, a roof of Cumbrian Slate topped off with a copper covered cupola. Masons were employed to dress the considerable quantity of stonework with the exception of the window sills which were cut by a special machine recently invented. Inside, the Assembly Hall was built to accommodate three hundred students and was to have an oak parquet floor whilst the rest of the school was to have floors of Canadian Maple parquet. There were those who regarded this huge office rising from the ground with scorn, predicting that there would never be enough students to make use of the accommodation provided. To overcome the slope on the east side of the site and provide a playing area for the children, the land was terraced and substantial retaining walls were built to prevent any danger of movement of the land. The bottom terrace was grassed over to provide a playing field. The lower ground floor contained two covered play areas built so that they could easily be converted into classrooms.

The foundation stone was laid on 30 August 1909 by Dr, George Booth, a local medical practitioner, described as being to doyen of educationalists in Chesterfield He was to have a long association with the school as chairman of the governing body and always encouraged the education of girls. This stone is still to be seen on the north east corner of the building. Behind it was placed a bottle containing a parchment giving a description of the building, the circumstances of its erection, the names of the governing body together with newspapers and coins of the realm. The whole building cost £24,000.

Miss Wilkes, alas, was never to benefit from the new school for she retired owing to ill health in 1910 and died on 10 December the same year.

=== The 1910s ===
Miss Linnell became Head Mistress in January 1911 and in September that year the new building was opened by the Duke and Duchess of Devonshire. Though the school was at this time was fee-paying a surprising number of pupils were awarded grants by the County Council to cover all or part of their fees. It was not only the wealthy who could afford to send their children to the Girls' High School. A study of the occupations of the parents shows that the pupils came from varied backgrounds, for the September intake of 1911 the fathers' employment covered a wide variety of jobs. Miss Linnell's headship was of short duration as she left in 1913 to take up a post in Burton-on-Trent. Miss Easterby, known to many generations of kindergarten and transition pupils gave a lifetime of teaching to the school, joining the staff in July 1911 and retiring in July 1943.

Miss Munro was appointed Head Mistress and took up her post in September 1913. On 15 October that year the school celebrated its 21st birthday.

By now there was a definite school uniform of box-pleated gym tunic with a white blouse for the more senior pupils. Gym stripes were first awarded in this year.

Miss Stevens, who had been with the school since its foundation, relinquished her position as second mistress in 1912 because of failing health and eventually had to retire in 1914. In the same year, a school outing was arranged to Grindleford by train, than by wagonette to Eyam, a walk back to Grindleford and home again by train. This First World War was declared in the August and by 1915 the pupils at the High School were joining the war effort, knitting for the soldiers. It was reported in the school magazine that 91 scarves, 6 helmets, 40 belts, 3 pairs of cuffs and 2 pairs of socks had been dispatched to the men at The front. The following year, 1916, saw the girls busy collecting foxglove leaves to be used in the preparation of the drug digitalis.

The number of pupils in the school at this time was 34 boys and 300 girls, the boys being in the junior school only.

School dinners had been supplied at the cost of 6d but, owing to wartime conditions, the price had to be increased to 8d. Fees for attending the school were: Seniors £2-2s–0d per term and Juniors £1-5s–0d per term. Coal fires were lit in each form room; the cost of coal being 2s 6d per ton. The chimney-sweeping bill came to a total of £1-1s–0d. Games played an important part in school life, netball in the winter and cricket and tennis in the summer. At the end of the war, Peace Medals were presented to the pupils by Sir Henry Hadow. Some members of staff returned to teaching after being away on war work. However, the World War still cast its shadow over proceedings and it is sad to note that, out of nineteen marriages recorded in the school magazine, four old girls had lost their husbands, killed in action, before the magazine was published.

In 1917 the death of Mary Swanwick occurred. She had been the first woman governor of the school.

By 1918, with the end of the war, the school settled back into a peacetime routine. The number of pupils on roll increased each year so that there were now 349 girls and 12 boys so, only seven years after its opening, pupil numbers were near the limit for which the school was originally built. The staff had increased to twenty including the Head Mistress and it was agreed that staff salaries should be paid six times a year instead of at the end of each term as had previously been the arrangement.

The subjects taught at this time were History, Science, Classics, Modern Languages, Art, English, Scripture, Music and Singing, Gymnastics, Games and Dancing – a wide curriculum for the young ladies of 1918.

=== The 1920s ===
By 1920, the school was going from strength to strength and the ever-increasing number of pupils was becoming an embarrassment. There were nearly four hundred girls and space was at a premium. It was at this time that St Helens House came up for auction on the death of the last private owner, Mr. Burkitt. The Governors decided in some haste to dispatch one of their number to bid for the property. He succeeded in purchasing the House for £2,863, Alderman Johnson Pearson providing the deposit which was required at the time of sale. The County Council did not altogether approve of being manoeuvred into buying a property in this hasty fashion but, after a letter which gently rapped the governors' knuckles, they seem to have co-operated over the adaptation of the House for school use. In 1922 the Lower School, i.e. Kindergarten, Transition, Forms 1 and 2 and the Lower Third moved from the main building to St Helens House. From then on, the main building was always referred to as Big School. Lack of teaching space saw the conversion of the covered playground at the south-east corner of the building into one form room and two Biology labs.

The first Sports Day was held; the races were run on the bottom terrace which was still grass and known as 'The Lawn'. The races were between forms as the House System had yet to be introduced. The appointment of eleven prefects was reported in the school magazine; the prefect system was to last until the 1960s when it gave way to the VIth form committee.

=== The 1930s ===
During the 1920s,the school experienced significant academic evolution.Young women were no longer content to remain at home upon completing their secondary education; Instead, a growing number pursued higher education. This was particularly evident in the field of teacher training, which benefited from the introduction of a highly effective progressive system. Under this initiative, aspiring educators undertook a preparatory year of practical teaching before enrolling in college. This system served as a valuable filtering mechanism, allowing institutes unsuited for classroom management to redirect their career paths. Concurrently, university enrollment among female graduates steadily rose. Despite these academic advancements, health challenges remained a stark reality for the student body. Sadly there were those whose future looked bleak and there were a number of pupils who left on account of ill health reminding us that the 'good old days' lacked the medical skills to conquer tuberculosis, rheumatic fever and other debilitating illnesses. The nineteen twenties came to an end with the school flourishing both academically and on the sports field. Much progress had been made in adapting and improving the accommodation – and numbers were still rising.

=== The 1940s ===
The war years changed life, though lessons went on as usual in spite of the lack of equipment of all types. Margins were no longer acceptable in exercise books and both back and front covers had to be used for writing. School trips abroad were just a memory and even journeys into the countryside were curtailed for a short while. Because of the lack of blackout, the school closed promptly at 3.30 pm and so societies of all kinds lapsed. The School Magazine ceased to be published because of the shortage of paper and the staff were initiated into the tiresome task of fire watching. Being on duty at night in the school, even with a companion for company, must have been an eerie experience, and the sleeping accommodation was not exactly three star. Evacuees, mainly from London, joined the school though in most cases they were not destined to stay for long. An air-raid warden's post was built just inside the main gate of the school and still exists, though today it now contains down-to-earth things like gas meters. National Savings groups were formed and the school adopted a Navy Motor Boat, sending the crew letters, books and at Christmas, cake which must have required some ingenuity in the making owing to the rationing of food. Some of the VIth form decided to start a chess club ad they met in different houses each Saturday afternoon, or if the weather was good, they went on rambles instead.

In 1941, the last entrants into the kindergarten were admitted. The Education Act of 1944 was looming in the distance and this decreed that the school would from then on take only pupils from eleven to eighteen. In spite of the war, the 'little ones' were still able to queue for buns at break and, though these were not of a high quality and all seemed to taste the same irrespective of what they were supposed to be, they were welcome.

=== The 1950s ===
Structural alterations to the school building continued throughout the nineteen fifties. A new domestic science room was created by knocking down the wall between the existing domestic science room and the form room next door. The now completed Physics Laboratory and VIth Form Chemistry Laboratory came into use.

The venue for Speech Day in 1950 was the Civic Theatre, now the Pomegranate Theatre, in Chesterfield, with the attendant problem of marching six hundred plus girls to and from school.

In 1951, the long-awaited stage extension was installed and the lighting system improved. The play "Tobias and the Angel" was produced and a Verse Speaking Competition re-established. The smoke nuisance from the hospital chimney was once again in the news. It covered the terraces with a layer of grit and soot which provided interesting conditions for those playing netball on wet days. Visiting teams were at a distinct disadvantage for the home team had learnt to cope with the slippery surface. The problem was only solved when the Royal Hospital moved to Calow in 1984 by which time a new chimney had been built on the Technical College site on the other side of the courts.

In December 1951, Miss Ingram left the school to become Head Mistress and Holly Lodge School in Liverpool and, in January 1952, Mrs. Miller took her place.

=== The 1960s ===
School plays had now become an annual event and in 1960 a production of "Viceroy Sarah" was performed.

A badminton team was formed and won all its matches and the other sports teams, hockey, netball, and rounders had successful seasons but the real honours that year went to the tennis team who won the Northern Area Final of the Aberdale Cup played at Wimbledon. The Derbyshire Advertiser reported "St Helena School of Chesterfield won unstinted praise from the Lawn Tennis Association for their display in the Aberdale Cup. Their deportment was the admiration of officials and the competing schools – all of which were girls' public schools". Greater glory was to follow in 1961 for the team again won the Northern Area Final and, at Wimbledon in July, went on to win the Aberdale Cup, the first Grammar School ever to have won the trophy.

== List of head teachers ==
Name	Years
Miss L. Wilkes & Miss A. Stevens	1892–1906
Miss L. Wilkes	1906–1911
Miss E. H. Linnell	1911–1913
Miss M. E. Munro	1911–1925
Miss D. Hyslop	1925–1946
Miss D Ingram	1946–1951
Mrs. B. M. Miller	1951–1961
Miss. B. M. Clark	1961–1985
Miss J. Hamblin (Acting Head)	1985–1986 (April)
Miss D. Lucas	April 1986 – 1990
Mrs. N. Hirst (Acting Head)	1990–1991
