= Julius Geppert =

German pharmacologist

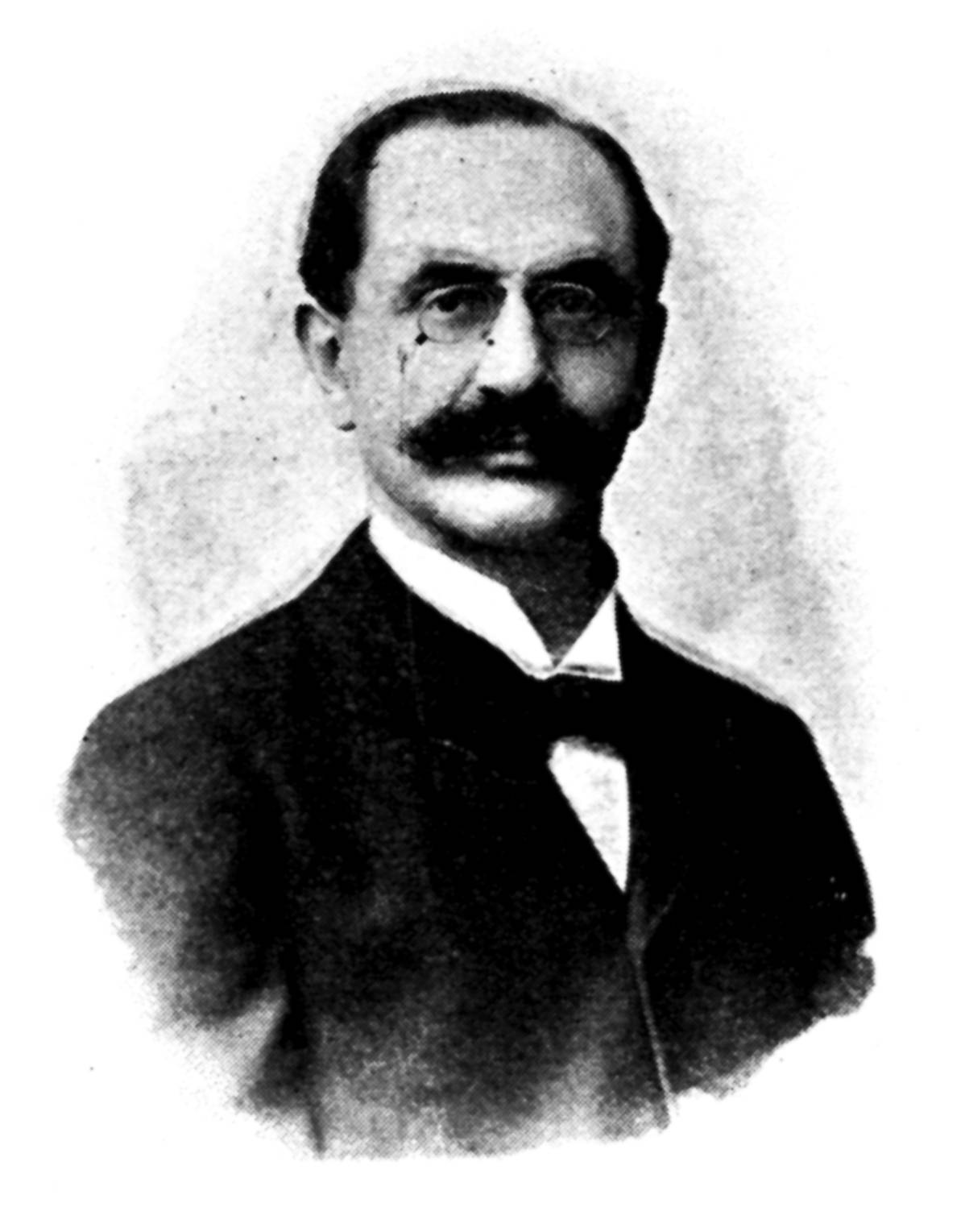
Julius Geppert (1856-1937)

August Julius Geppert (November 7, 1856 – March 12, 1937) was a German pharmacologist born in Berlin.

Geppert is known for research involving the physiology of respiration, anesthetics and hygiene. With physiologist Nathan Zuntz (1847-1920), he developed the Zuntz-Geppert'schen Respirationsapparat (Zuntz-Geppert respiratory apparatus).

== Biography ==
He studied medicine at the Universities of Heidelberg and Berlin, earning his doctorate in 1880 with a thesis titled Die Gase des arteriellen Blutes im Fieber (The arterial blood gases during fever). From 1880 to 1885 he worked as an assistant at the second medical clinic in Berlin, becoming a lecturer at the University of Bonn during the following year. From 1893 he was an associate professor of pharmacology, attaining the title of "full professor" in 1899 at the University of Giessen.

== Written works ==
- Ueber die Wirkungen der verdünnten Luft auf den Organismus (On the effects of rarefied air on the organism), with Albert Fraenkel, Berlin 1883.
- Die Gasanalyse und ihre physiolog. Anwendung (Gas analysis and its physiological application), Ib. 1885.
- Über die Regulation der Athmung (On the regulation of respiration), with Nathan Zuntz, 1888.
- Über das Wesen der Blausäurevergiftung (On the nature of cyanide poisoning, 1889
- Zur Lehre von den Antisepticis (The doctrine of antiseptics), 1889
- Ueber desinficirende Mittel und Methoden (On disinfecting means and methods. 1890
- Zur Methodik der Gasanalyse (On the methodology of gas analysis), 1898.
- Eine neue Narcosenmethode (A new anesthesia method), 1899.
