= Martin-Baker Mk.6 =

British ejection seat

Mk.6
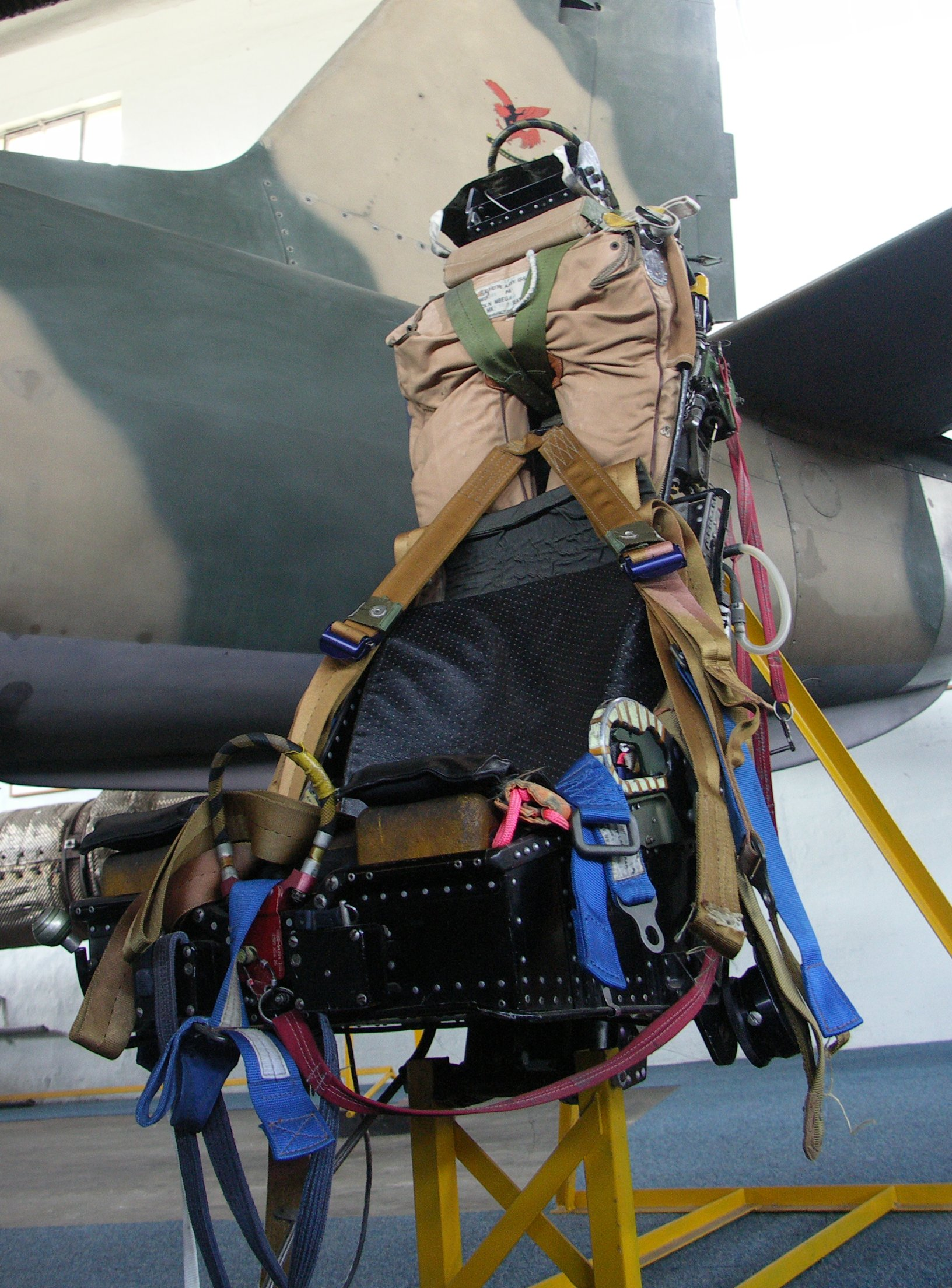
- Martin-Baker Mk.6 on display at the South African Air Force Museum

The Martin-Baker Mk.6 is a British rocket-assisted ejection seat designed and built by Martin-Baker. Introduced in the 1960s, the Mk.6 has been installed in combat and training aircraft worldwide.

== History ==
The Mk.6 seat was developed from the earlier Mk.4 design by the addition of a rocket pack to enable zero-zero capability. A variant of the Mk.6 was fitted with a compressed air cylinder crew breathing system to provide underwater ejection capability for the carrier-borne Blackburn Buccaneer aircraft.

== Operation sequence ==
Operating either the seat pan or face blind firing handles initiates aircraft canopy jettison, as the canopy clears an interlock is removed which allows the main gun located at the rear of the seat to fire, the main gun is a telescopic tube with two explosive charges that fire in sequence. As the seat moves up its guide rails an emergency oxygen supply is activated and personal equipment tubing and communication leads are automatically disconnected, leg restraints also operate.

As the seat moves further up and out of the aircraft the rocket pack is fired by a lanyard attached to the cockpit floor. A steel rod, known as the drogue gun, is fired and extracts two small parachutes to stabilise the seat's descent path. A barostatic mechanism prevents the main parachute from opening above an altitude of 10,000 ft (3,000 m) A time delay mechanism operates the main parachute below this altitude in conjunction with another device to prevent the parachute opening at high speed. The seat then separates from the occupant for a normal parachute descent, a manual separation handle is provided should the automatic system fail.

== Applications ==
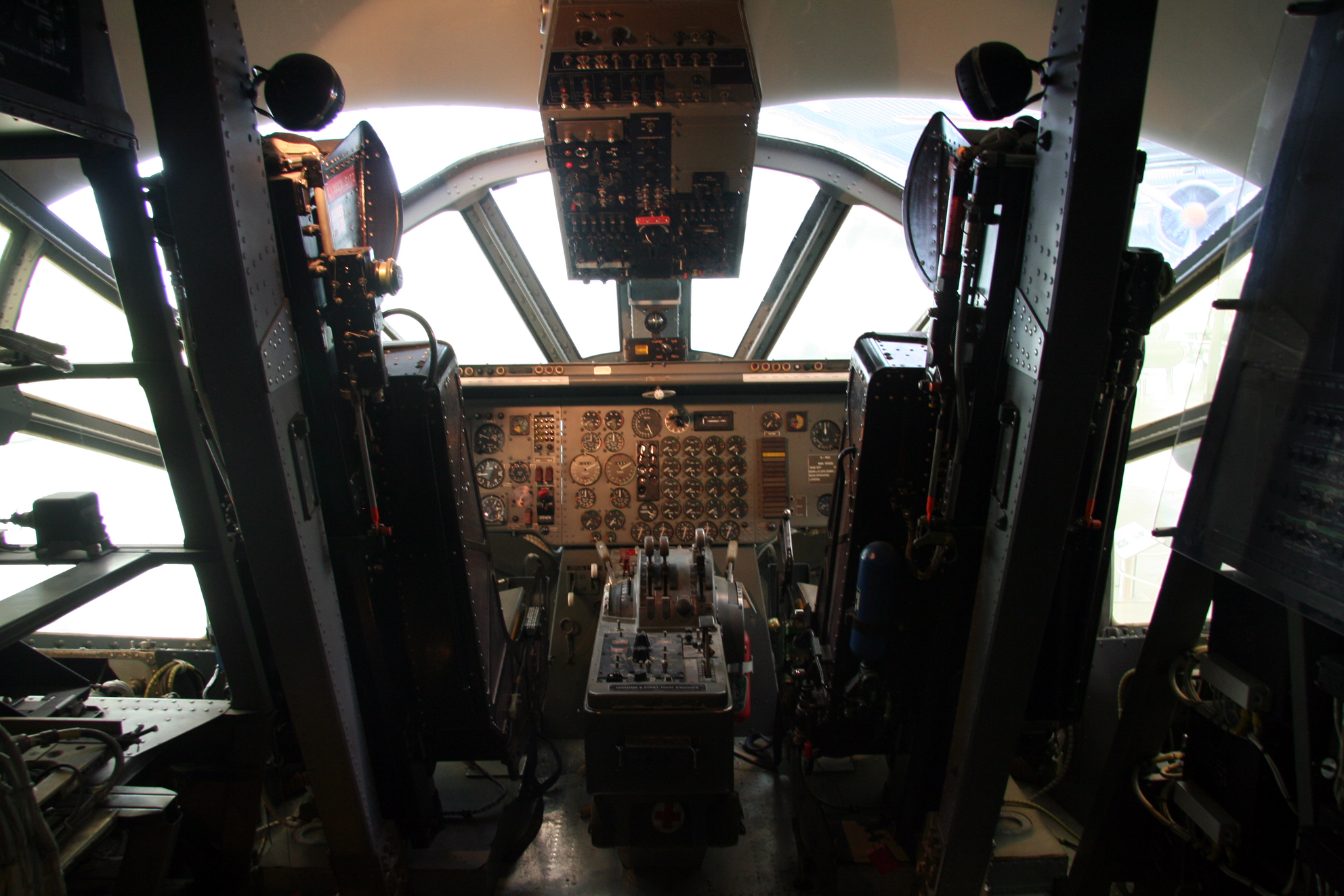
Dual Mk.6 seat installation of the Dornier Do 31

The Mk.6 ejection seat has been installed in the following aircraft types:
List from Martin-Baker.

- Aermacchi MB-326/Atlas Impala
- Atlas Cheetah
- Blackburn Buccaneer
- Dassault Balzac V
- Dassault Mirage III
- Dassault Ouragan
- Dassault-Breguet Super Étendard
- Dornier Do 31
- Fiat G.91
- FMA IA 58 Pucará
- Hawker Siddeley P.1127
- Hunting H.126
- IAI Dagger
- IAI Kfir

== Specifications (Mk.6) ==
- Maximum operating height: 50,000 ft (15,240 m)
- Minimum operating height: Ground level
- Minimum operating speed: Zero
- Maximum operating speed: 600 knots indicated airspeed
