= Calow =

Village and civil parish in Derbyshire, England

Coordinates: 53.2354°N 1.3774°W

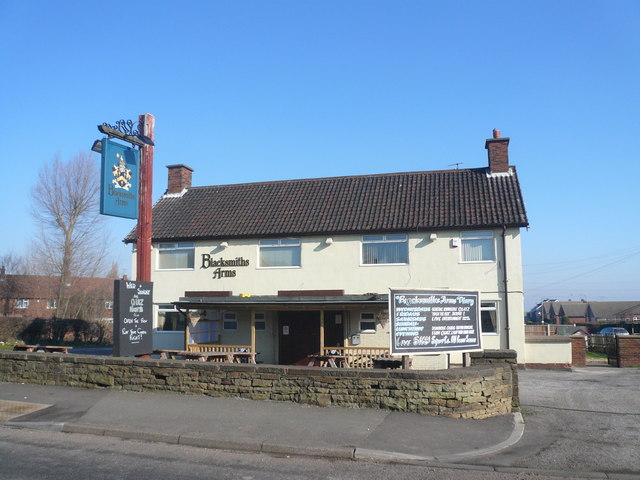
- The Blacksmiths Arms in Calow

- Calow parish highlighted within Derbyshire
- Population: 2,494 (2011)
- OS grid reference: SK415711
- Civil parish: Calow
- District: North East Derbyshire
- Shire county: Derbyshire
- Region: East Midlands
- Country: England
- Sovereign state: United Kingdom
- Post town: CHESTERFIELD
- Postcode district: S44
- Dialling code: 01246
- Police: Derbyshire
- Fire: Derbyshire
- Ambulance: East Midlands
- UK Parliament: North East Derbyshire

Calow is a village and civil parish in the county of Derbyshire in England. The population of the village at the 2011 census was 2,494. Calow is in North East Derbyshire and is adjacent to Chesterfield.

The origins of the village date back to 1086, when it was known as Kalehal (the bare corner of land). In 1430 it was known as Calell, then Calo in 1561 before acquiring its present name. It is recorded that there was a manor house which ’belonged to the king’ around the same time that the Domesday Book was compiled. The manor was in the possession of the successive families of Breton, Loudham and Foljambe, which were notable families at the time.

Coal and iron were worked in the village and for some time blast furnaces were in operation. Coal mined in Calow supplied furnaces in the nearby village of Duckmanton.

The Chesterfield Royal Hospital, built just outside the boundaries of Calow, was opened in 1984. Amenities in Calow include; shops, a small park, a chemist, a primary school and a community centre.

Methodist minister the Rev'd Kathleen Richardson took as her title ’Baroness Richardson of Calow’, after the village, when she was created a life peer in 1998. Baroness Richardson was the subject of an edition BBC Radio 4 programme Lords A Living. The programme, broadcast in January 2011, reflected on the Baroness returning to visit the village in which she spent her childhood.

The village Scout Group was formed by the Reverend C. W. Handford in 1933. The group celebrated its 75th anniversary in 2008 with a number of events, some of which were attended by Mr Clifford Parker, a survivor from the original 1933 group. The group has established international links with groups in Canada and Australia.

The Pipe-field (known as the 'Pipey' to locals) is a notable location in Calow. Named as such due to a pipe which runs under the field and is exposed towards one end.

== Notable people ==
Notable people born in Calow include:

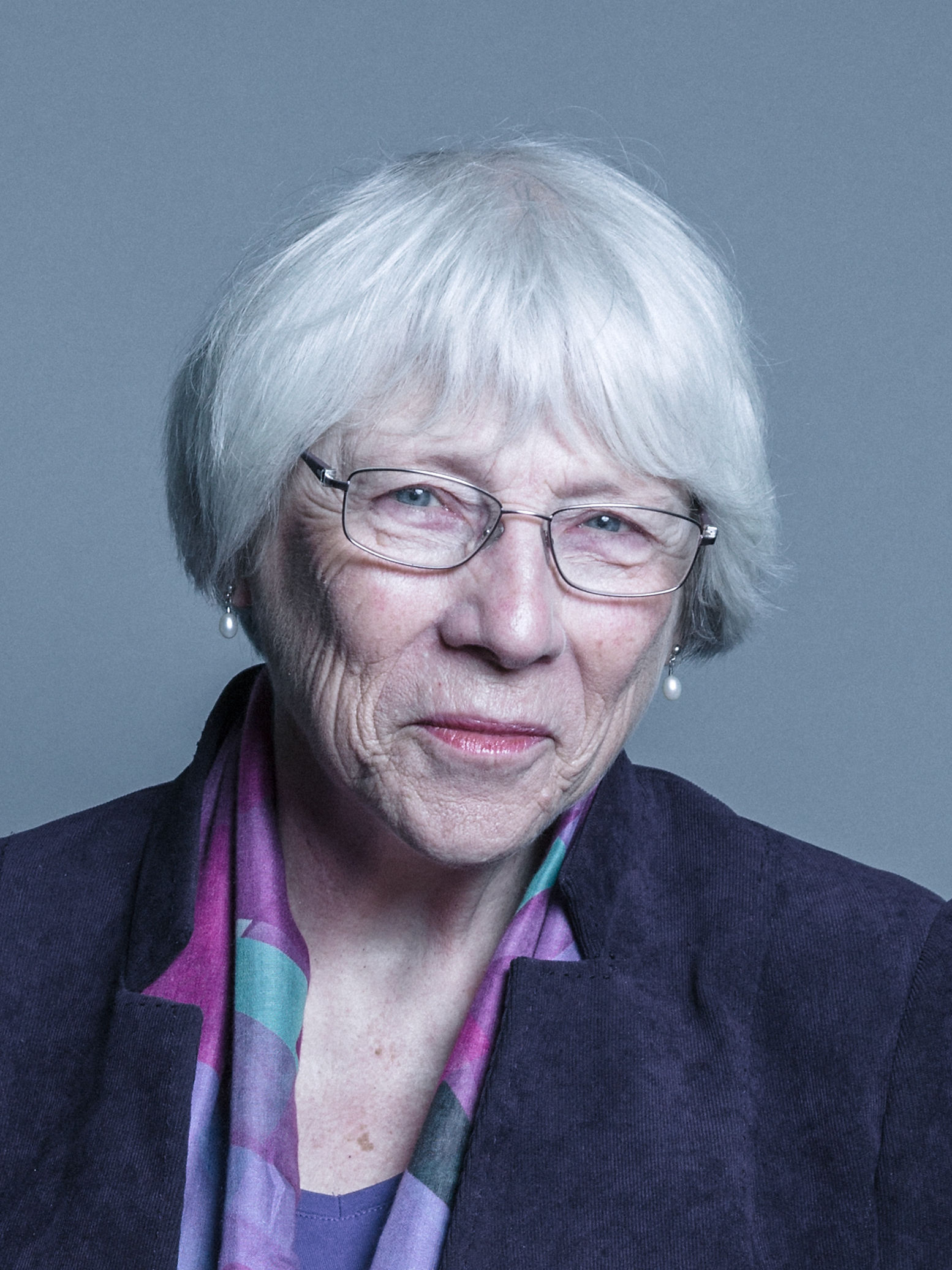
Baroness Richardson of Calow, 2018

- Kathleen Richardson, Baroness Richardson of Calow (born 1938), Methodist minister. the first woman president of the Methodist Conference

=== Sport ===
- Harry Bedford (1899–1976), footballer, played 498 games, including 203 with Derby County and 172 with Blackpool
- Malcolm Partridge (born 1950), footballer, played 340 games including 138 for Mansfield Town.
- Andrew Needham (born 1957), former first-class cricketer, who played 109 first-class cricket matches
- Thom Latimer (born 1986), professional wrestler, with the American-based National Wrestling Alliance

== See also ==
- Listed buildings in Calow
