= Angelo Mosso =

Italian physiologist (1846–1910)

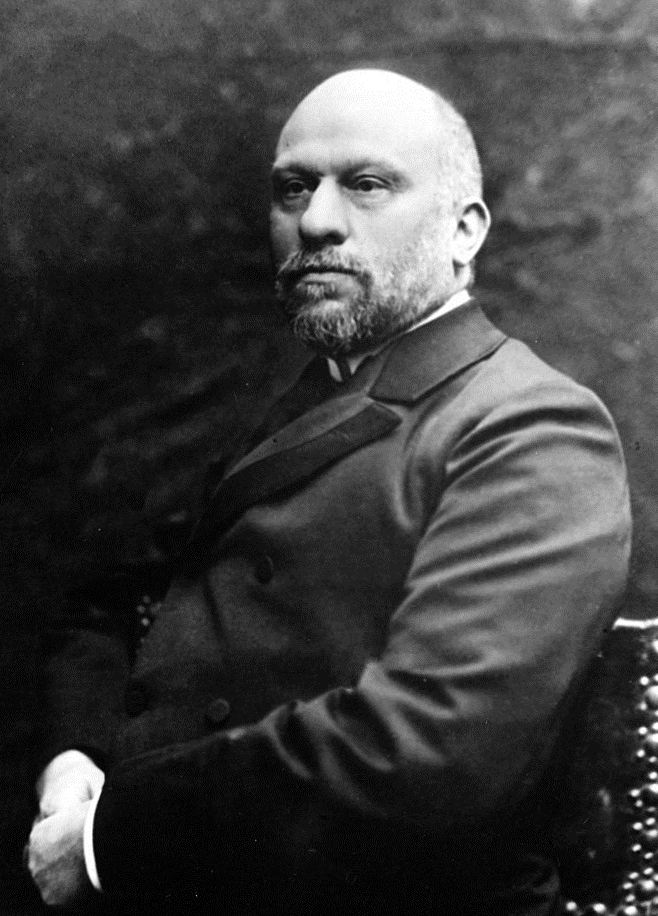
Angelo Mosso in the 1880s

Angelo Mosso (30 May 1846 – 24 November 1910) was a 19th-century Italian physiologist who invented the first neuroimaging technique, known as 'human circulation balance'. He was born and died in Turin.

== Work ==
Mosso began his groundbreaking work by recording the pulsations of the human cortex in patients with skull defects following neurosurgical procedures. He observed that these pulsations changed during mental activity, leading him to infer that blood flow to the brain increases during such activities. To non-invasively measure the redistribution of blood during emotional and intellectual activity in healthy subjects, Mosso invented the 'human circulation balance'. This invention is regarded as the first neuroimaging technique ever and is a forerunner of more refined techniques like functional magnetic resonance imaging (fMRI) and positron emission tomography (PET).

Born in Turin, Mosso studied medicine in Turin, Florence, Leipzig, and Paris. He was appointed professor of pharmacology in 1876 and professor of physiology in 1879 at the University of Turin. Mosso invented various instruments to measure the pulse and conducted extensive experiments on the variations in pulse volume during sleep, mental activity, and emotion. In 1900–01, he visited the United States and embodied the results of his observations in Democrazia nella religione e nella scienza: studi sull' America (1901). In 1882, he co-founded the Archives Italiennes de Biologie with Emery, a journal in which many of his essays were published. Among his other works are:

- Die Diagnostik des Pulses (1879)
- Sulla paura (1884)
- La paura (1891; English translation by E. Lough and F. Kiesow, Fear, London, 1896)
- La fatica (1891; English translation by M. A. and W. B. Drummond, Fatigue, New York, 1904)
- La Temperatura del cervello (1894)
- Fisiologia dell' uomo sulle Alpi (1897; third edition, 1909); English translation, 1898
- Mens Sana in Corpore Sano (1903)
- Vita moderna degli Italiani (1905)
- Escursioni nel mediterraneo e gli scavi di Creta (1907; second edition, 1910; English translation, The Palaces of Crete and their Builders, New York, 1907)
- La preistoria: original della civilta mediterranea (1910; English translation by M. C. Harrison, The Dawn of Mediterranean Civilization, New York, 1911)
- Nuovo Antologia (in collaboration)

Mosso was elected a member of the Royal Swedish Academy of Sciences in 1897.

== Inventions ==
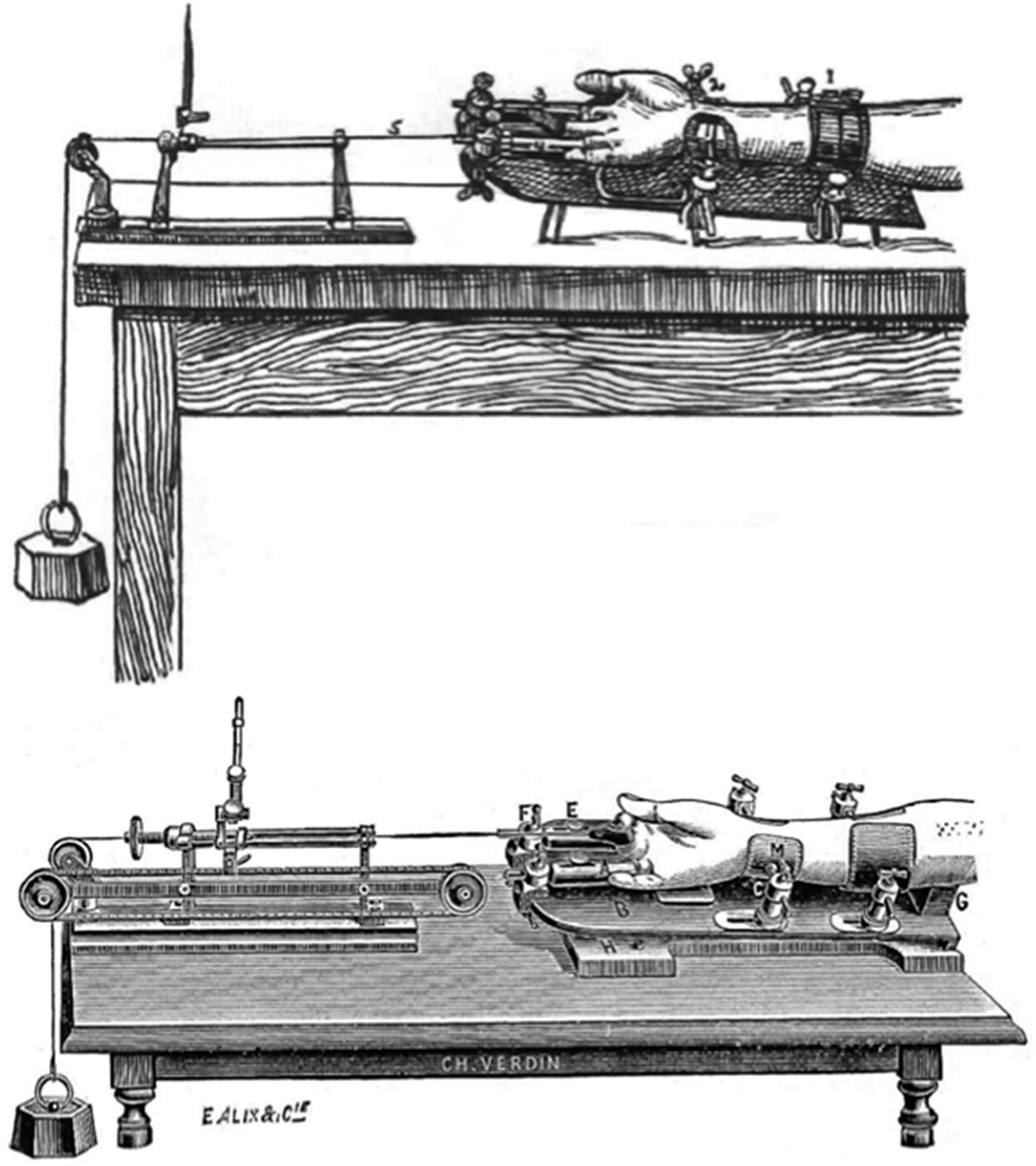
Two versions of Mosso's ergograph, as sold through Charles Verdin's catalogues, from 1890 and 1904

- Mosso's balance, rediscovered by Stefano Sandrone and colleagues
- Mosso's ergograph – (1890) An apparatus for recording the force and frequency of flexion of the fingers
- Mosso's sphygmomanometer – An instrument for measuring blood pressure in the arteries

The American Illustrated Medical Dictionary (1938)
