= Nathan Zuntz =

German physiologist (1847–1920)

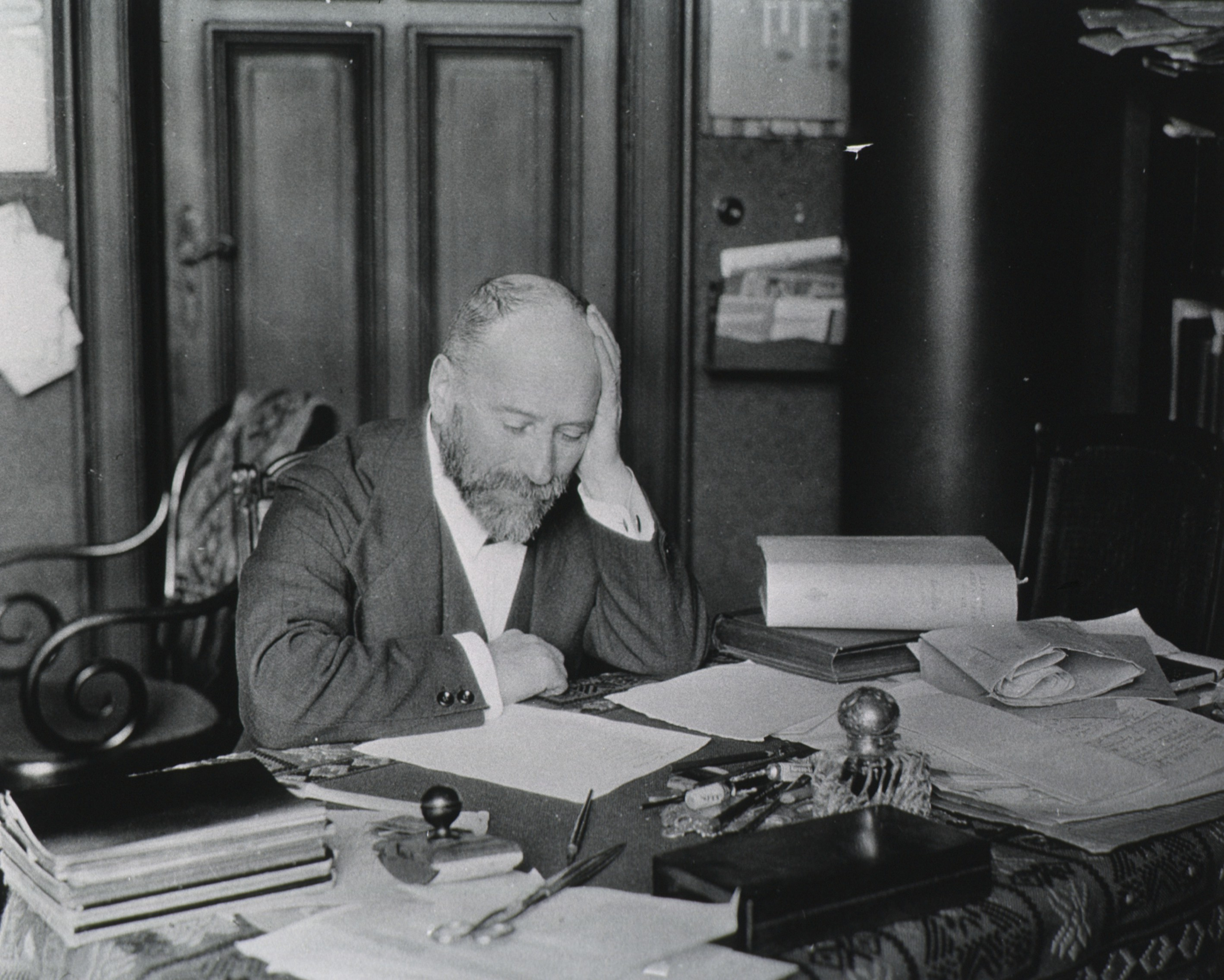
Nathan Zuntz

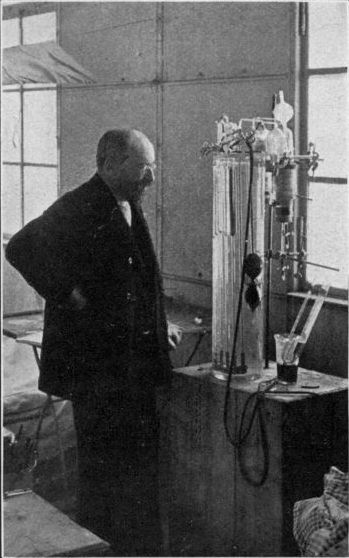
Nathan Zuntz on Tenerife (1910)

Nathan Zuntz (6 October 1847 in Bonn – 22 March 1920 in Berlin) was a German physiologist born in Bonn. He was a pioneer of modern altitude physiology and aviation medicine.

== Academic career ==
He studied medicine at the University of Bonn, where he was an assistant to Max Schultze. In 1868 he earned his doctorate, and following a study trip to Berlin, returned to Bonn in 1870 as an assistant to physiologist Eduard Pflüger. The following year he became a lecturer at the University of Bonn, and in 1872 was an honorary professor of physiology at the Landwirtschaftliche Akademie at Poppelsdorf. From 1881 until his retirement in 1919, he was a professor at the Landwirtschaftliche Hochschule Berlin (Royal Agricultural College) in Berlin. In 1884, Nathan Zuntz was elected as member of the German Academy of Sciences Leopoldina.

== Scientific investigations ==
Zuntz was involved in many facets of physiological research, including metabolism, respiration and nutrition, and is well known for his work in high-altitude physiology. He conducted extensive research on the physiological changes in animals and humans in extreme conditions. Many of his field studies were conducted at Capanna Regina Margherita, a research station at the apex of Monte Rosa, Italy. In 1902 with his assistant Hermann von Schrötter and meteorologists Arthur Berson and Reinhard Süring, he made two high-altitude balloon ascents in which they reached an altitude of 5000 meters. In 1910 Zuntz participated in a scientific expedition to Pico de Teide in the Canary Islands with Schrötter and physiologists Arnold Durig (1872-1961) and Joseph Barcroft (1872-1947).

He published a number of articles on high-altitude medicine, and one of his better known works was Höhenklima und Bergwanderungen in ihrer Wirkung auf den Menschen (High-Altitude Climate and Mountaineering and their Effect on Humans). In 1885 with August Julius Geppert (1856-1937), he created the Zuntz-Geppert respiratory apparatus, and for field studies Zuntz invented a portable Gasuhr (dry gas measuring device). In 1889 he constructed an early treadmill (Laufband), and in 1914 added an X-ray apparatus to the machine in order to observe cardiac changes during exercise. In addition, he opened the first laboratory dedicated to sports medicine in Germany (1911).

== Selected publications ==
- Der Stoffwechsel des Pferdes bei Ruhe und Arbeit (The metabolism of the horse at rest and work), 1889 (with C. Lehmann and O. Hagemann)
- Studien zu einer Physiologie des Marsches (Studies on physiology of marches) Berlin, 1901 (with W. Schumburg)
- Ergebnisse zweier Ballonfahrten zu physiologischen Zwecken (Results of two balloon rides for physiological purposes) Pflügers Archiv 92 (1902), 479-520 (with H. von Schrötter)
- Höhenklima und Bergwanderungen in ihrer Wirkung auf den Menschen. Ergebnisse experimenteller Forschungen im Hochgebirge und Laboratorium (High-altitude climate and mountaineering and their effect on humans. Results of experimental research in the high mountains and the laboratory), 1906 (with Adolf Loewy, F. Müller and W. Caspari)
- Lehrbuch der Physiologie des Menschen (Textbook of human physiology), 1909 (with A. Loewy)
- Zur Physiologie und Hygiene der Luftfahrt (The physiology and hygiene involving aviation), 1912
