= Yandell Henderson =

American physiologist

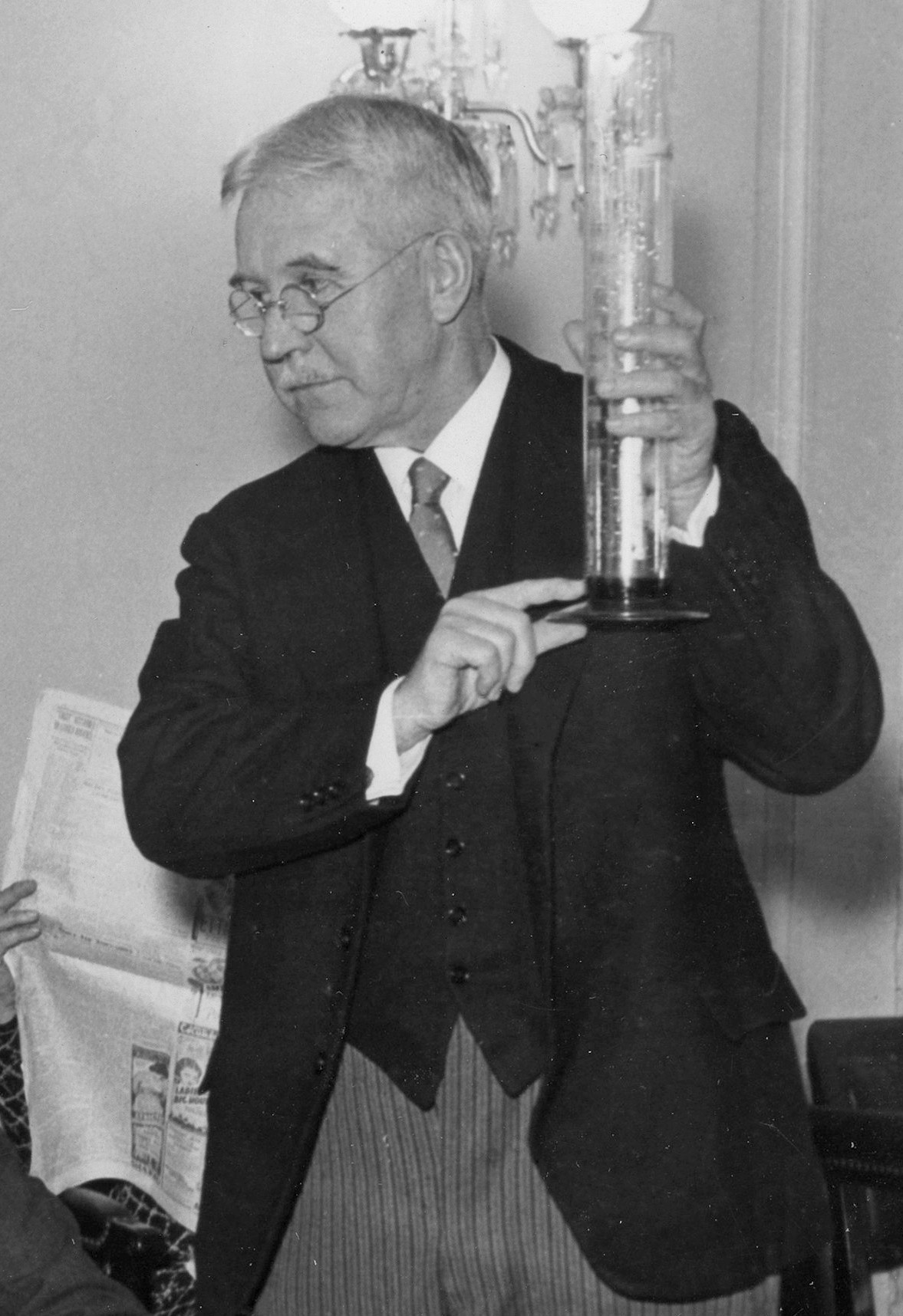
Yandell Henderson testifying in 1932 before a U.S. Senate subcommittee that beers containing 3-4 vol.% alcohol were not intoxicating

Yandell Henderson (April 23, 1873 – February 18, 1944) was an American physiologist. The New York Times called him an "expert on gases" and "an authority on the physiology of respiration and circulation and on pharmacology and toxicology of gases". He was also noted for new methods in resuscitation. Henderson was a director of the Yale Laboratory of Applied Physiology at Yale University, a member of the National Academy of Sciences, chairman of the section of physiology and pathology of the American Medical Association. He was also a member of the American Philosophical Society. A collection of his papers are held at the National Library of Medicine in Bethesda, Maryland.

Beyond his scientific contributions, Henderson acted as a leading advocate of public health, especially in his opposition to the use of tetraethyl lead in gasoline in the early 1920s. Though he did not succeed in preventing its commercialization, his warnings predicted the public health consequences that would result. Fifty years later, in 1973, the U.S. Environmental Protection Agency issued regulations controlling the lead content of gasoline. He was a member of the Connecticut Academy of Arts and Sciences.
