= Arnold Durig =

Austrian physiologist (1872-1961)

- Born: 12 November 1872; Innsbruck, Austria
- Died: 18 October 1961 (aged 88); Schruns, Austria
- Education: University of Innsbruck
- Awards: Lieben Prize (1906)
- Scientific career
- Fields: Physiology

Arnold Durig (12 November 1872 – 18 October 1961) was an Austrian physiologist remembered for his investigations involving physiological and pathophysiological aspects of individuals exposed to high altitude conditions.

He very probably served as the model for the "impartial person" in Sigmund Freud's polemic booklet "The Question of Lay Analysis" (1926).

== Decorations and awards ==
- 1906: Lieben Prize (Imperial Academy of Sciences, Vienna)
- 1917: Member of the German Academy of Sciences Leopoldina
- 1953: Corresponding member of the Bavarian Academy of Sciences and Humanities
- Officer's Cross of the Order of Franz Joseph, with war decoration
- Military Merit Medal (Austria-Hungary)
- Decoration of Honour for Services to the Red Cross, 1st class
- Red Cross Medal, 1st and 2nd class (Prussia)
- Honorary citizen of the City of Vienna (1932)
- Freeman of Tschagguns
- In Montafon, streets are named after Arnold Durig: Hofrat-Durig-Weg in Schruns and Hofrat-Durig-Straße in the Latschau district of Tschagguns
- Arnold Durig and Lorenz Böhler are commemorated by the Durig-Böhler Prize awarded in Vorarlberg
- The Arnold Durig Award is awarded periodically by the Austrian Society for Nutrition to and the Arnold Durig Memorial Lecture is given at the Society's annual meetings.

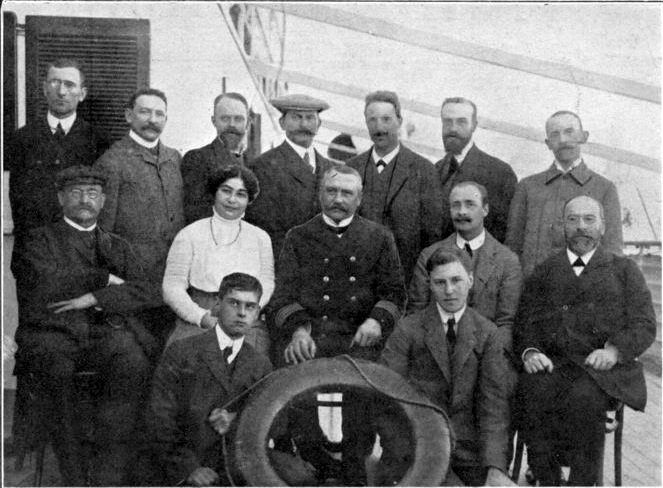
1910 expedition to Tenerife, Durig in back row, third member from the right.

== Selected writings ==
- Beiträge zur Physiologie des Menschen im Hochgebirge. Internationales Institut für Hochgebirgsforschungen Monte Rosa 1903, 1904 - Contributions in regards to the physiology of people living in the mountains. International Research Institute for high altitude research at Monte Rosa in 1903.
- Physiologische Ergebnisse der im Jahre 1906 durchgeführten Monte Rosa-Expedition (1909, second edition 1911) - Results of physiological work conducted on the 1906 Monte Rosa expedition.
- Zum Ernährungsproblem Österreichs, 1920 - On the problem of nutrition in Austria.
- Appetit : Vortrag, 1925 - Appetite: Lectures.
- Die Grundlagen der praktischen Ernährungslehre, 1928 - The basics of practical nutrition education.
- Über die physiologischen Grundlagen der Atemübungen, 1931 - The physiological principles of breathing exercises.
- Über Blutdruck und Blutdruckmessung, 1932 - On blood pressure and blood pressure measurement.
