= Berlin scientific balloon flights =

Series of balloon flights

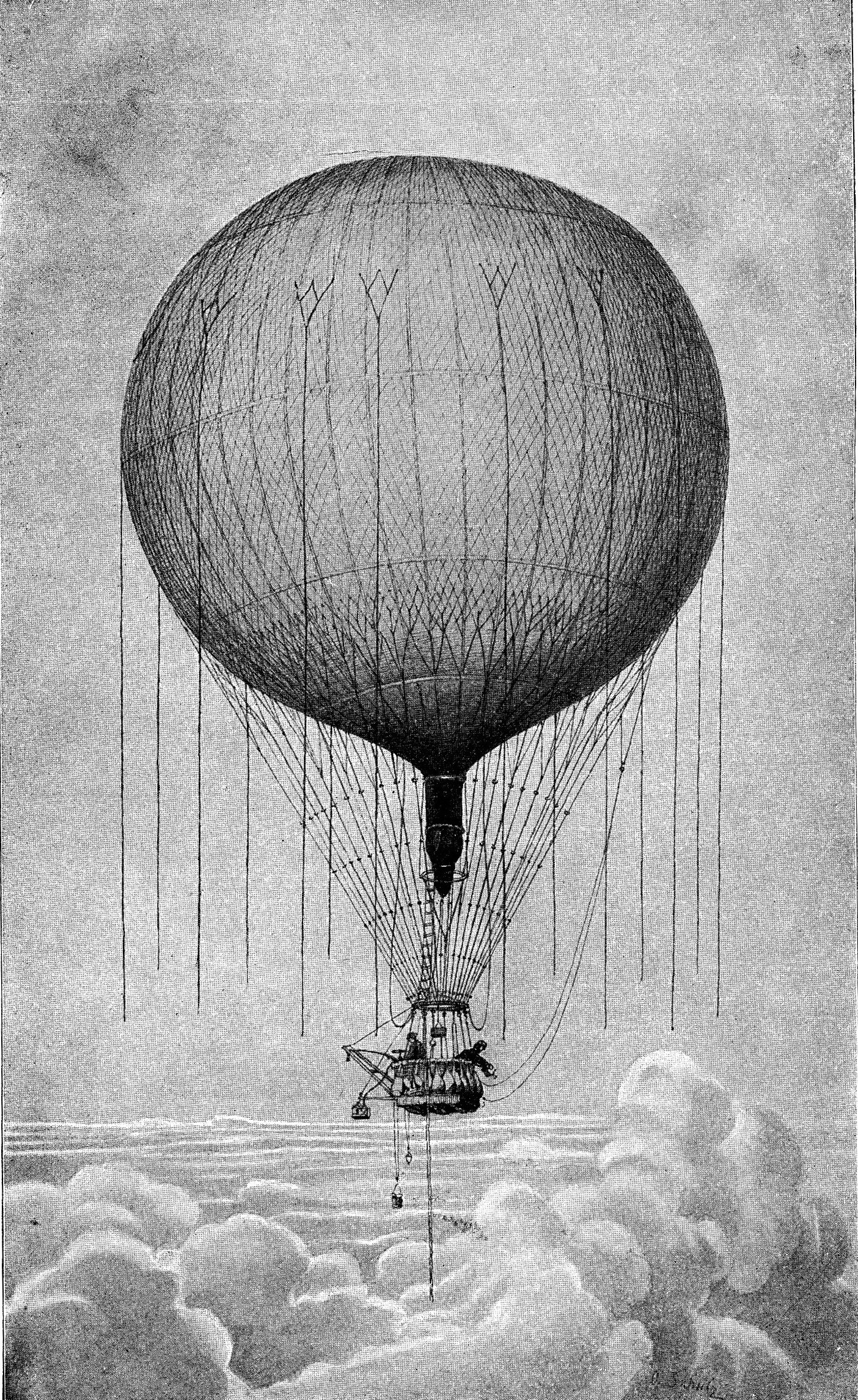
The balloon Humboldt, drawing by Hans Groß

The Berlin scientific balloon flights (Berliner wissenschaftliche Luftfahrten) were a series of 65 manned and 29 unmanned balloon flights carried out between 1888 and 1899 by the German Society for the Promotion of Aeronautics to investigate the atmosphere above the planetary boundary layer. The flights were organized by Richard Aßmann, Professor at the Meteorological Institute of Berlin, who also developed the most important of the measurement instruments employed by them. The execution lay primarily in the hands of the military airship pilot Hans Groß and the meteorologist Arthur Berson. In 1894, Berson flew with the balloon Phönix to a height of 9155 meters, the highest that any human had flown until then.

== Background ==
=== Meteorology in the 1880s ===
In the course of the 19th century, meteorology was no longer solely an observational and descriptive science. On the basis of classical physics, especially particle and continuum mechanics and mechanical thermodynamics, it was developed into a science of measurement and calculation, to a physics of the atmosphere. The basics of atmospheric thermodynamics were already worked out in the 1880s, but the description of the dynamics was through simple approaches such as Buys Ballot's Law.

Scientific weather forecasting was still in its infancy in the late 19th century. This was on one hand due to incomplete knowledge of atmospheric processes, and on the other due to a lack of reliable observations. Observations were almost all made from land, while there were only vague ideas about the vertical structure of the atmosphere.

=== Early scientific ballooning ===
The potential of balloons for research on the upper atmosphere was recognized early on. On the first flight of a gas balloon on 1 December 1783, its inventor Jacques Charles brought along a thermometer and a barometer along with him. In the following year, the chemist Antoine Laurent de Lavoisier established on behalf of the Académie française a program for scientific aviation, that was eventually not realized. In Germany, it was Georg Christoph Lichtenberg, who first addressed the issue of research into the atmosphere in his writings on the use of balloons.

The first balloon flight with the aim of making meteorological observations was undertaken on 30 November 1784 by the American medical doctor John Jeffries together with the professional balloonist Jean-Pierre Blanchard. Some of the first systematic investigations into the upper atmosphere was performed between 1862 and 1866 by the English meteorologist and important pioneer aerologist James Glaisher. On 28 balloon flights, he measured the temperature, air pressure, humidity and the wind speed up to an altitude of almost 9000 meters. As his instruments were not sufficiently protected from solar radiation, and as he placed them inside the basket, his temperature measurements were particularly high and affected by errors. In the following years, most scientific balloon flights were made by French scientists such as Camille Flammarion, Gaston Tissandier and Wilfrid de Fonvielle. However, the investigation of the upper atmosphere remained isolated endeavors of individual researchers until the 1890s.

=== Developments in Berlin ===
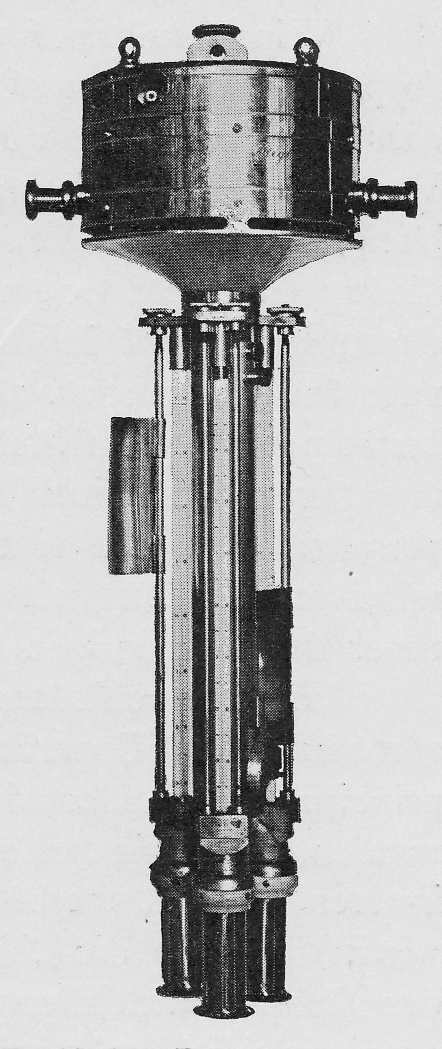
Three-part balloon aspiration psychrometer in the design of Aßmann

In 1885, Wilhelm von Bezold was appointed to the newly established Chair for Meteorology at the Friedrich-Wilhelms-Universität, and as the director of the Prussian Meteorological Institute, both in Berlin. He profoundly restructured the institute, and hired three scientific commissioners on 1 April 1886, among whom was the physician and meteorologist Richard Aßmann from Magdeburg. Aßmann had been working since 1883 on a measurement device that could measure the air temperature accurately in spite of the disruptive effect of solar radiation. In 1887, Aßmann joined the Society for Promotion of Aeronautics (founded in 1881) together with other early Berlin meteorologists, where he got to know the engineer Hans Bartsch von Sigsfeld. Sigsfeld had worked on the same problem for the aviation department (established in 1884) of the Railway Troops of the Prussian Army. Together, they developed the Aßmann aspiration psychrometer, which excluded the influence of sunlight through shielding and permanent ventilation.

The temperature profiles made by Glaisher had long stood as secure knowledge, although there had been isolated doubts about their validity, as they conflicted with theoretical predictions. Aßmann and Sigsfeld saw now the possibility to critically test Glaisher's results with their new instrument.

On 2 June 1888, Wilhelm von Bezold made a speech at the 100th meeting of the German Society for the Promotion of Aviation on "The Meaning of Aviation to Meteorology". In this speech, he sketched a program of cooperation between meteorology and aviation in the investigation of the upper atmosphere, that was well received by members of the Society. Its implementation dominated the activities of the Society for more than a decade. Already on 23 June 1888, Sigsfeld's balloon Herder made its first trip.

== Financing ==
Significant capital was required to undertake this endeavor. Through donations from Society members (Rudolph Hertzog, Werner von Siemens, Otto Lilienthal), the tethered balloon Meteor was purchased. The Royal Prussian Academy of Sciences made a one-time grant of 2000 Marks. Several private citizens (Hans Bartsch von Sigsfeld, Kurt Killisch-Horn (1856–1915), Patrick Young Alexander) put their private balloons at the disposal of the project. Nonetheless, the Society was not in a position to raise the funds to build and maintain a suitable balloon. Subsequently, a "Committee for the Organization of Scientific Flights" was set up in mid-1892, composed of Richard Aßmann, Wilhelm von Bezold, Hermann von Helmholtz, Werner von Siemens, Wilhelm Foerster, August Kundt and Paul Güßfeldt. The committee made an appeal to Kaiser Wilhelm II, which was supported by the Academy of Sciences. The Kaiser granted the request of 50 thousand Marks for the building and operation of the balloon Humboldt from his "Allerhöchsten Dispositionsfonds". After the crash-landing of the Humboldt, he granted a further 32 thousand Marks for the building of the Phönix. To finance additional flights, and for the publication of the scientific results, a renewed application was made in 1895, for which 20,400 Marks were paid. In 1897, the publisher Georg Büxenstein donated a thousand Marks for the building of the recording balloon Cirrus II.

Strong support for the project also came from the Prussian military, which had a pronounced interest in the military use of the skies. Officers of the Luftschifferabteilung undertook in most cases the piloting of the balloons. The meteorologists were often allowed to take part in military training flights. Premierleutnant (senior lieutenant) Groß was intermittently released from his official duties and responsible for the construction of the balloons used for the main flights.

== Participants ==
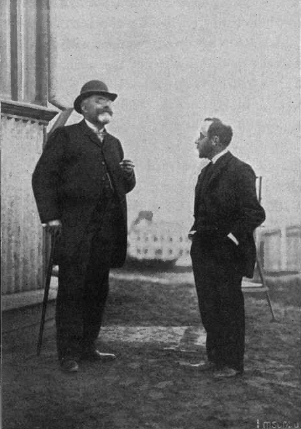
Richard Aßmann and Arthur Berson

The organizer of the Berlin scientific flights was Richard Aßmann. In addition to his position at the Meteorological Institute, he was also the chairman of the Society for Promotion of Aviation from the beginning of 1889. Aßmann took care to obtain excellent instruments and equipment. As leader of the project, he only participated personally in three of the manned flights.

His closest colleague in the Meteorological Institute since 1889 was Arthur Berson, who took part in 50 of the 65 manned flights. On 31 flights, Berson served as the primary observer, and on 9 as balloon pilot, and for 10 solo flights he played both roles. Berson also played a great part in the scientific analysis of the measurement data.

The Premierleutnant (senior lieutenant) of the Berliner Luftschifferabteilung, Hans Groß, was the builder of the gas balloons used, and in 32 flights as pilot, he played an important role in the preparation and execution of the flights. His steady improvements to the available balloon technology, such as the adoption of a rip-device to quickly release the filling gas that is still used almost unchanged by contemporary gas balloons, made the potentially risky endeavor much safer.

Alongside Berson was also Reinhard Süring, who was later the director of the Meteorological and Magnetic Observatory at Potsdam. He served as scientific observer (10 flights), pilot (1 flight), and went on three solo flights. As observer, he flew with Otto Baschin (five flights) Richard Börnstein (three), Victor Kremser (two), Hans Bartsch von Sigsfeld (with whom he also flew once as pilot), and Edmund Köbke, as well as once each with Hermann Stade (1867–1932), Börnstein's assistant Becker, the physician Braehmer and Abbott Lawrence Rotch, the director of the Blue Hill Meteorological Observatory in Boston.

Other participants were the professional pilots Richard Opitz (1855–1892) and Stanley Spencer, the British aviation pioneer Patrick Young Alexander, and a series of military balloonists such as Major Stephan von Nieber (1855–1920), the commander of the Luftschifferabteilung, and Richard von Kehler.

== Technical equipment ==
=== Balloons ===
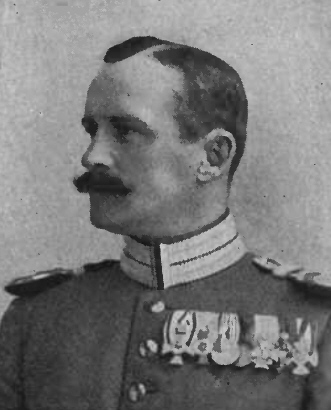
Hans Groß

Sixteen different balloons were used for the 65 manned balloon flights. These ranged from the balloon Falke, which had a gas volume of 290 cubic meters and was used as the "bad weather balloon" when strong winds or bad weather made it impossible to use the larger balloons, to the 3000 cubic meter Majestic of the Briton, Patrick Alexander. About three-quarters of the flights were made on the large balloons M. W., Humboldt, Phönix, Sportpark Friedenau I and Sportpark Friedenau II. The gas used for lifting was hydrogen or the cheaper coal gas, or frequently a mixture of the two.

The balloon Phönix was of special significance, as it was especially constructed by Groß for scientific flights. It had enough lifting power to make high-altitude flights possible. Its hull was built from two layers of rubberized and vulcanized cotton fabric. It contained two valves of different sizes: the smaller was to allow the release of filling-gas during manoeuvres in flight, while the larger was to empty the balloon after landing. In response to the crash-landing of the Humboldt after its sixth flight, Groß fitted the Phönix with a newly developed "Reißbahn" (rip-track), that was stuck to the rest of the hull before the start of the flight. By pulling on the Reißbahn, the balloon pilot could open up the balloon hull wide, to allow a rapid deflation without causing it to be destroyed in the process. Additionally, the balloon's fabric was regularly impregnated with a 10% solution of calcium chloride, to make it electrically conductive and thus prevent electrical sparking due to electrostatic charging, following a suggestion from Bartsch von Sigsfeld.

For a safe landing, most balloons carried a heavy anchor. After the development of the Reißbahn, these were superfluous and so often omitted from later flights. In most cases, the equipment included a tow line, that was about 100 m long in smaller balloons, and 150 m for larger ones. Aviators breathed in oxygen through tubes from steel gas cylinders during high-altitude flights to avoid altitude sickness.

Balloons used in the manned flights
Balloon	Volume (m³)	Material of balloon hull	Flights	Notes
M. W.	1,180	Varnished cotton	5	Privately owned (Killisch von Horn), without tow line
Humboldt	2,500	Rubberized cotton	6	Designed and produced for the scientific balloon flights, suitable for high-altitude flights
Phönix	2,630	Rubberized cotton	23	Designed and produced for the scientific balloon flights, the first to be fitted with a "Reißbahn", suitable for high-altitude flights
Falke	290	Goldbeater's skin	3	Decommissioned military balloon of British manufacture
Sperber	800	Varnished cotton	1	Acquired from the bankruptcy assets of a professional balloon pilot
Sportpark Friedenau I und II	1,250	Rubberized cotton	13	Purchased for sporting flights, very light and also suitable for high-altitude flights
Herder	1,600	Varnished cotton	1	Privately owned (Bartsch von Sigsfeld)
Majestic	3,000	Varnished silk	3	Privately owned (Alexander)
Excelsior	1,600	Varnished cotton	1	Privately owned (Spencer)
Bussard, Condor, Albatross, Dohle	1,300	Rubberized cotton	7	Military balloon of the Luftschifferabteilung
Posen	1,000	Rubberized cotton	1	Military balloon of the Luftschifferabteilung
Feldballon	500	Rubberized cotton	1	Military balloon of the Luftschifferabteilung

The tethered balloon Meteor was made from varnished silk and could reach an altitude of about 800 meters when filled with 130 cubic meters of coal gas. The measurement balloon Cirrus, made from the same material, was a former military tethered balloon with a fill volume of 250 cubic meters. On its fifth flight it carried measurement instruments to an altitude of almost 22 kilometers. Cirrus II was made of rubberized silk of lower quality and had a volume of 400 cubic meters.

=== Measurement instruments ===
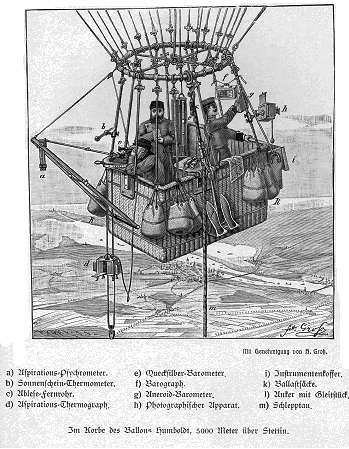
Attachment of instruments in the basket of the Humboldt, drawing by Hans Groß

The research program provided for the measurement of air temperature and humidity and the radiant intensity at different altitudes on every flight. Additionally, the flight heading and speed were recorded and observations on clouds were made. The altitude was calculated from the barometric formula from the air pressure and temperature. To make these measurements, the following instruments were generally used:

- Aneroid barometer constructed by Otto Bohne in Berlin
- Mercury barometer made by the firm of Rudolf Fuess in Berlin,
- Aneroid barograph by Richard Frères in Paris,
- Three-part aspiration psychrometer from Fuess, consisting of one dry and two alternately moistened thermometers, that were kept in a constant stream of air by a clockwork ventilation mechanism,
- Thermometer made by Fuess.

Furthermore, the ground facilities had a compass, a watch and a Moment-Apparat (camera) made by C. P. Goerz after a design by Ottomar Anschütz. To measure temperature without the disturbance from body heat of the passengers and from the basket which was warmed by the sun, the aspiration psychrometer was mounted outside the basket on a boom. It was read with the help of a telescope. To humidify the psychrometer, the boom was raised briefly every thirty minutes. The apparatus was occasionally expanded or modified. On high-altitude flights, in order to read air temperatures below the freezing-point of mercury, an alcohol thermometer was used.

== Events ==
=== Overview ===
Aßmann called the first flights "preliminary". These were used to test the measurement instruments, especially the aspiration psychrometer. Since Bartsch von Sigsfeld moved to Munich and Augsburg at the end of 1888 and took the balloon Herder with him, there was thereafter no other suitable balloon available in Berlin. The tests were moved to Munich from 1889. Aßmann had to confine himself to a few experiments with the tethered balloon Meteor. At the beginning of 1891, a free-flying balloon, M. W., was finally available. Although it was heavy and therefore could never fly above 2000 meters, with its help the tests were successfully completed. Once the psychrometer was ready in its mature form in 1892, systematically-arranged flights could be started.

There were 36 principal flights in 1893 and 1894, of which 23 were on the Phönix. These were arranged so as to cover as wide a spectrum of weather situations at different times of day and periods of the year as possible, in order to get a complete picture of the physical relationships of the free atmosphere. In addition to single flights, there were also simultaneous ascents with more than one balloon, some of which were internationally agreed. At great personal risk, the participating meteorologists, especially Arthur Berson, attempted to reach ever-higher altitudes.

The principal flights delivered comprehensive data that had to be analyzed from 1895 onwards. Further observations were occasionally made on military or sporting flights, which were the additional flights. To confirm the results, another purely scientific flight was made in 1898.

Although the program was in general purely meteorological, it was sometimes productive for other scientific inquiries. Baschin and Börnstein made several measurements on the vertical gradient of electrical potential in the air. On 18 February 1897, Süring took rabbits as experimental animals in the balloon basket to research acute altitude sickness (balloonist's disease), and corresponded about this with the Austrian physiologist and flight physician Hermann von Schrötter.

=== Preliminary flights ===
The first flight was made on 23 June 1888 with the balloon Herder, which belonged to the military balloonist and Society member Hans Bartsch von Sigsfeld. Accompanying him were the professional balloonist Opitz and the meteorologist Victor Kremser. The flight started from the gas facility at Schöngeberg, where the balloon was filled with gas, and reached an altitude of almost 2500 m over Bunkenburg, which is today a part of Lachendorf, near Celle. Sigsfeld tested different methods of attaching the psychrometer to the basket.

The Society purchased the Meteor, in an attempt to compensate for Sigsfeld's move to Munich and its accompanying loss of its only suitable balloon. The spherical tethered balloon was however only usable under windless conditions. Beginning from early 1891, manned flights in free balloons could again be made, as the proprietor of the Berliner Börsen-Zeitung newspaper, Kurt Killisch von Horn, had Groß design the balloon M. W. and put it at the disposal of the Society for scientific flights. Until November, there were five flights. Especially notable was the fourth, because the American meteorologist Rotch was a participant, and because for the first time a simultaneous ascent was attempted. The Meteor was deployed at the same time as the M. W. After the fifth flight, the M. W. could not longer be used because it had been damaged by improper loading, and so once again no balloon was available. It was also clear that the M. W. was too heavy, and could only reach an altitude of 1800 m when only two people were in the basket.

Altogether the preliminary flights showed that the instruments were outstandingly suitable, and that the program was promising enough to continue.

=== Main flights ===
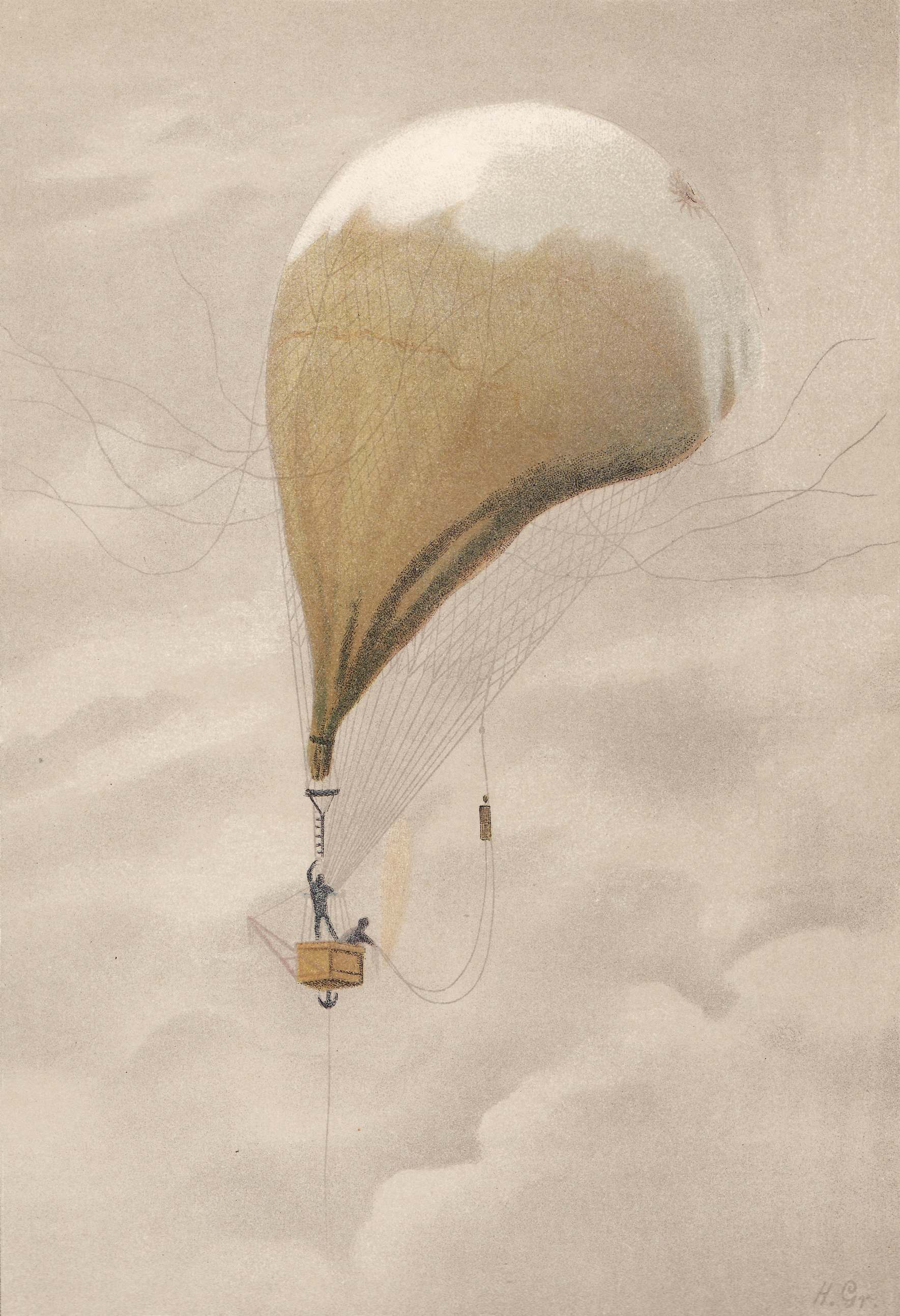
Crash of the Humboldt on 14 March 1893, drawing by Groß

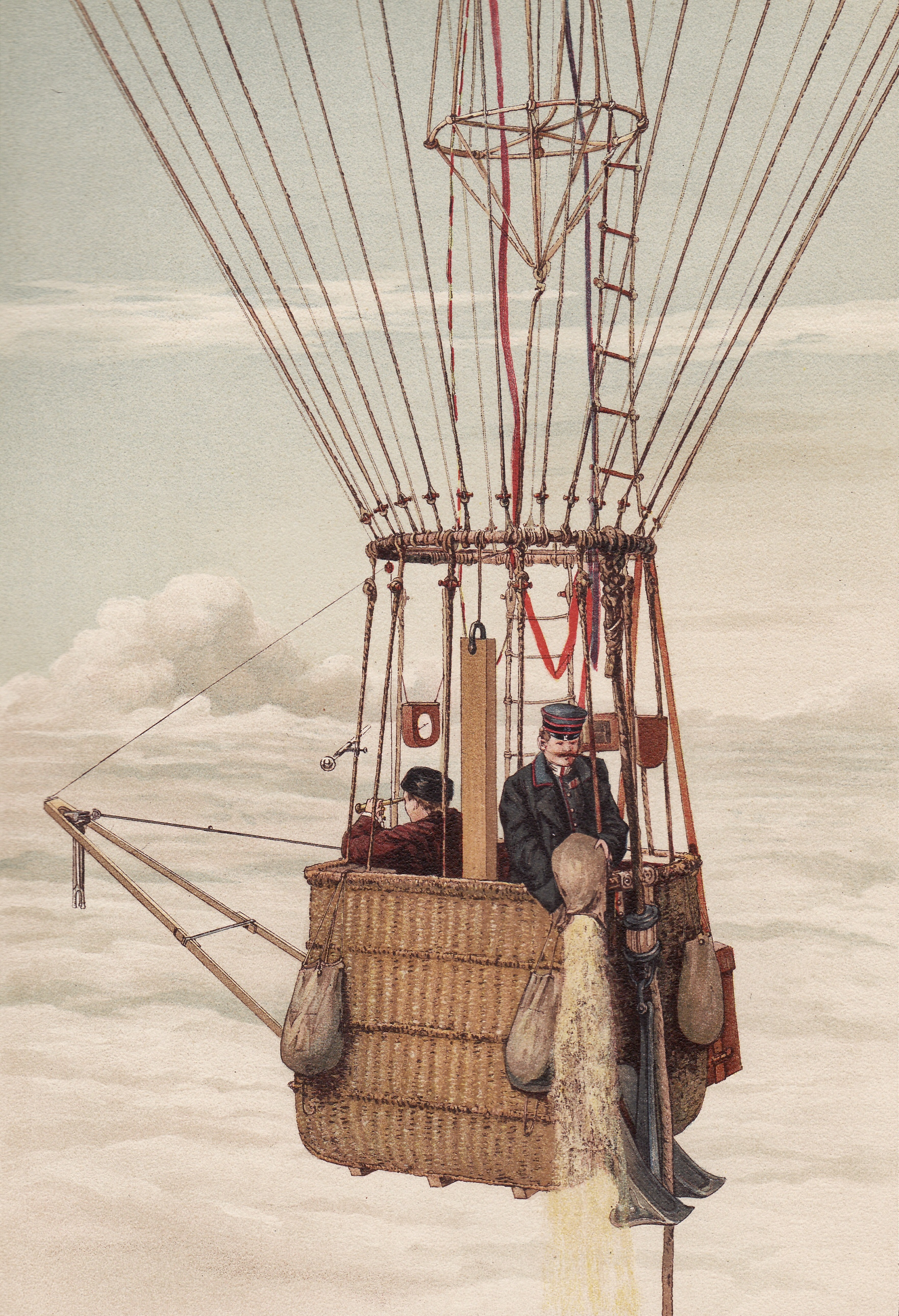
Berson (left) and Groß in the basket of the Phönix, drawing by Groß

For the lack of a balloon, there were no flights in 1892. Aßmann used this year to seek out private or institutional sponsors for his program. A direct appeal to Kaiser Wilhelm II was eventually successful. In 1893, the balloon Humboldt, again built to a design by Hans Groß, was completed. At 2,514 m³, it had more than twice the fill capacity as the M. W. and could therefore reach even higher altitudes. The first ascent of the Humboldt was made on 1 March 1893 in the presence of the Kaiser's family. The flight went peacefully, although upon landing, Aßmann broke his right leg. The later flights of the balloon were also beset by accidents, that made clear the risks to the scientists and balloon pilots. After the sixth flight on 26 April 1893, the balloon was burned as the hydrogen caught fire as it was being released after landing.

For the second flight of the Humboldt, which was planned to be a high-altitude flight, it was fitted with a smaller and lighter basket, and only two rather than three balloonists were to make the ascent. The balloon lifted off on 14 March amid pouring rain with Groß and Berson on board. Despite the greater weight from the rain, Groß could bring it to an altitude of 6,100 m. The aeronauts suffered from the thin air as they did not bring any oxygen with them. On the descent, a mishap occurred: a vent was released uncontrollably by a pull, and the balloon began to deflate during the flight. Groß had no way to close the vent, which was more than one meter across, so the balloon began to fall quickly. From the discovery of the problem at 2,800 m to reaching the ground took only nine minutes. Nonetheless the two balloonists survived with only minor wounds. On scientific terms the flight was a complete success. Berson could extensively study the clouds as they passed through them, and the temperatures measured at the highest altitudes threw further doubts on the accuracy of Glaisher's measurements from thirty years before.

After two and a half months, a new and improved balloon was completed. In allusion to the end of the Humboldt, it was named after the mythical phoenix. From 14 July 1893 to 4 December 1894, flights were made in quick succession. Night and dawn flights were made in addition to the day flights. The night flight on 14/15 July was also the first international coordinated flight, as in agreement with the meteorologists in Berlin, manned balloon flights using instruments recommended by Aßmann were also made in Stockholm by Salomon August Andrée and in Saint Petersburg. Coordinated flights were also made in August 1894 with Andrée in Gothenburg and Michail Pomorzew in Saint Petersburg.

On a few occasions, flights involving more than one balloon were made, beginning on 11 May 1984. It was attempted to bring the Phönix to as high an altitude as possible, and so it was filled with hydrogen rather than the cheaper coal gas. Accompanying this attempt was the military balloon Posen, the unmanned balloon Cirrus and the tethered balloon Falke. It reached an altitude of almost 8,000 m. Only by breathing in pure oxygen that they brought with them could Groß and Berson avoid falling unconscious. Because of different wind directions at their respective altitudes, the Posen was blown south to the neighborhood of Rangsdorf while the Phönix was brought northwards in the direction of Greifswald.

Phönix ballon flight of December 1894

After the success of the Berlin scientific balloon flights became generally known, the British aviation pioneer and promoter Patrick Young Alexander came to Berlin to participate in the flights with his ballon Majestic. Among other flights, he participated in the flight on 4 December 1894 from Berlin. Berson started alone on this day with the Phönix from Leopoldshall (near Staßfurt), partly because there was a convenient supply of hydrogen there, and also because the greater distance to the sea allowed a longer flight with a southerly wind direction. To allow them to reach the highest possible altitude, the basket was stripped of anything that was not strictly necessary, such as the anchor that weighed 40 kg. As the towline was difficult for a single person to handle, it was, contrary to the usual practice, already rolled up before the flight. The balloon, filled with 2,000 m³ of hydrogen, rapidly ascended, and reached 5,000 m within one hour. After two hours, and frequent use of supplemental oxygen by the pilots, the balloon reached equilibrium at 9,155 m altitude, with a temperature of −47.9 °C. As the ballast had been consumed to the point of the emergency reserves, Berson had to descend despite still being in a good physical state. He had reached an altitude higher than any human before him. After a total of five hours' flight, the Phönix landed in the vicinity of Kiel.

=== Additional flights ===
At the end of 1894, the financial resources were completely spent. Kaiser Wilhelm II, who had attended several balloon ascents, again put up a sum of money for additional flights and for the publication of the results. The money was mostly used for occasional measurement balloon flights. In addition, meteorological observers were also allowed to participate in many military flights. The frequency of flights increased, as the Society for the Promotion of Aviation purchased its own balloons for sporting flights, that were also used for meteorology.

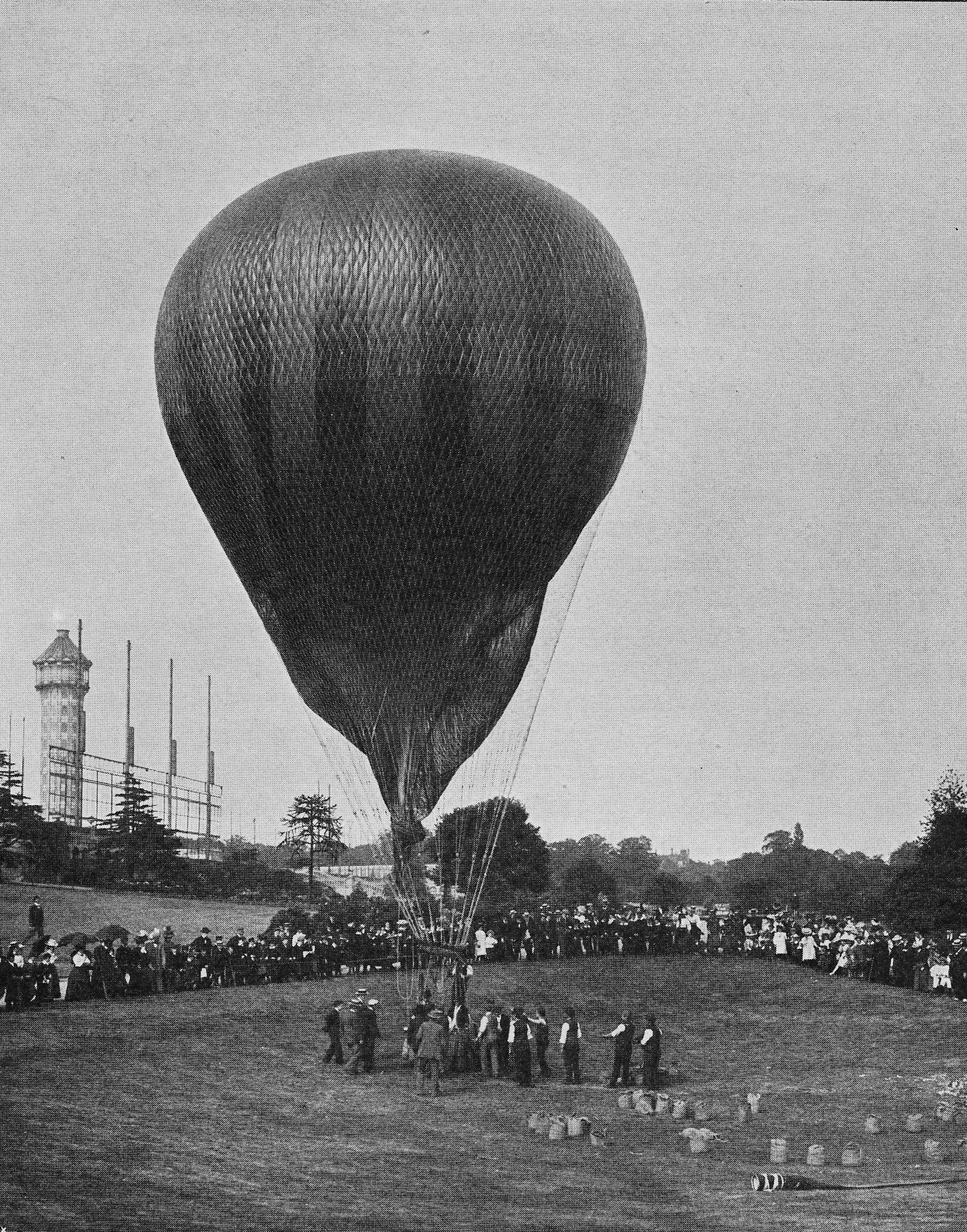
Ascent of the Excelsior in 1898 at Crystal Palace

The International Commission for Scientific Ballooning was founded in Paris in September 1896, at the conference of directors of meteorological institutes. Hugo Hergesell, the director of the Meteorological State Establishment of Alsace-Lorraine was elected as its president. The Berlin meteorologists regularly participated in simultaneous flights organized by the Commission, beginning with the first on 14 November 1896, with both manned and unmanned balloons.

After the first preliminary results of the main flights were published, which contained a criticism of Glaisher's measurement method, there was dissent from some specialists in the field. The eminent Swedish meteorologist Nils Ekholm reproached the authors for making "hasty generalizations". He held the considerable differences in measured temperature profiles between the London and Berlin flights to be real, and sought additional comparative measurements on flights over England and Germany, with both Glaisher's and Aßmann's instruments. The flights took place on 15 September 1898. The ascent at Crystal Palace was organized and financed by Patrick Alexander. Berson flew in the Excelsior with Stanley Spencer. At the same time, Süring flew in a balloon of the Society from the sport park at Friedenau in Berlin. Both flights were planned as high-altitude flights, and reached respectively 8,320 and 6,191 m. While the ground temperature differed by 7 degrees between Berlin and London, this difference had almost disappeared at the altitude of 5,000 to 6,000 m. The lowest temperature measured by Excelsior was −34 °C, compared to the temperature of −20.6 °C once measured by Glaisher at 8,000 m. The results confirmed the previous conclusions of Aßmann and Berson.

== Results ==
=== Scientific results ===
For the first time, advances in instrumentation and measurement methods allowed air temperature and humidity to be reliably measured at all times of day and under all weather conditions in systematically planned balloon flights. It could be shown that temperature measurements from earlier flights contained large errors, largely caused by insufficient shielding of the thermometer from direct solar radiation. The Berlin flights set quality standards for regular probing of the upper atmosphere with balloons and weather kites. Through international simultaneous flights, it pioneered a synoptic view of the upper atmosphere, and the use of three-dimensional data for the improvement of weather forecasting.

The flights offered a convenient means to study the stratification of the troposphere. Simultaneous measurements of temperature, pressure, and humidity could be combined with observations on horizontal and vertical wind movements and cloud formations and layering. However, the stratosphere was not discovered during this project, as the manned flights did not penetrate into this region, and because Aßmann thought that the temperature measurements from unmanned balloons above 10,000 m were an error caused by incomplete shielding from solar radiation. Aßmann eventually came to a different conclusion after a flight to 10,800 m by Berson and Süring on 31 July 1901 in the balloon Preussen, and a simultaneous unmanned flight. On 1 May 1902 he presented a paper titled "On the existence of a warm air current between 10 and 15 km" to the Prussian Academy of Sciences. However, the French meteorologist Léon-Philippe Teisserenc de Bort had already reported on the same discovery three days before in Paris. It is known today that the two researchers had previously agreed to publish this ground-breaking discovery simultaneously in their respective countries.

Die Berliner wissenschaftlichen Luftfahrten waren Höhepunkt einer mit klassischen physikalischen und aeronautischen Methoden betriebenen Erkundungsforschung im Bereich der Troposphäre und bildeten einen Markstein in der Erschließung der dritten Dimension für die meteorologische Forschung und Praxis.

("The Berlin scientific balloon flights were a high point in applying classical physical and aeronautical methods to make discoveries in the troposphere, and constitute a milestone in the opening of a third dimension for meteorological research and practice.")

— Karl-Heinz Bernhardt

=== Publications ===
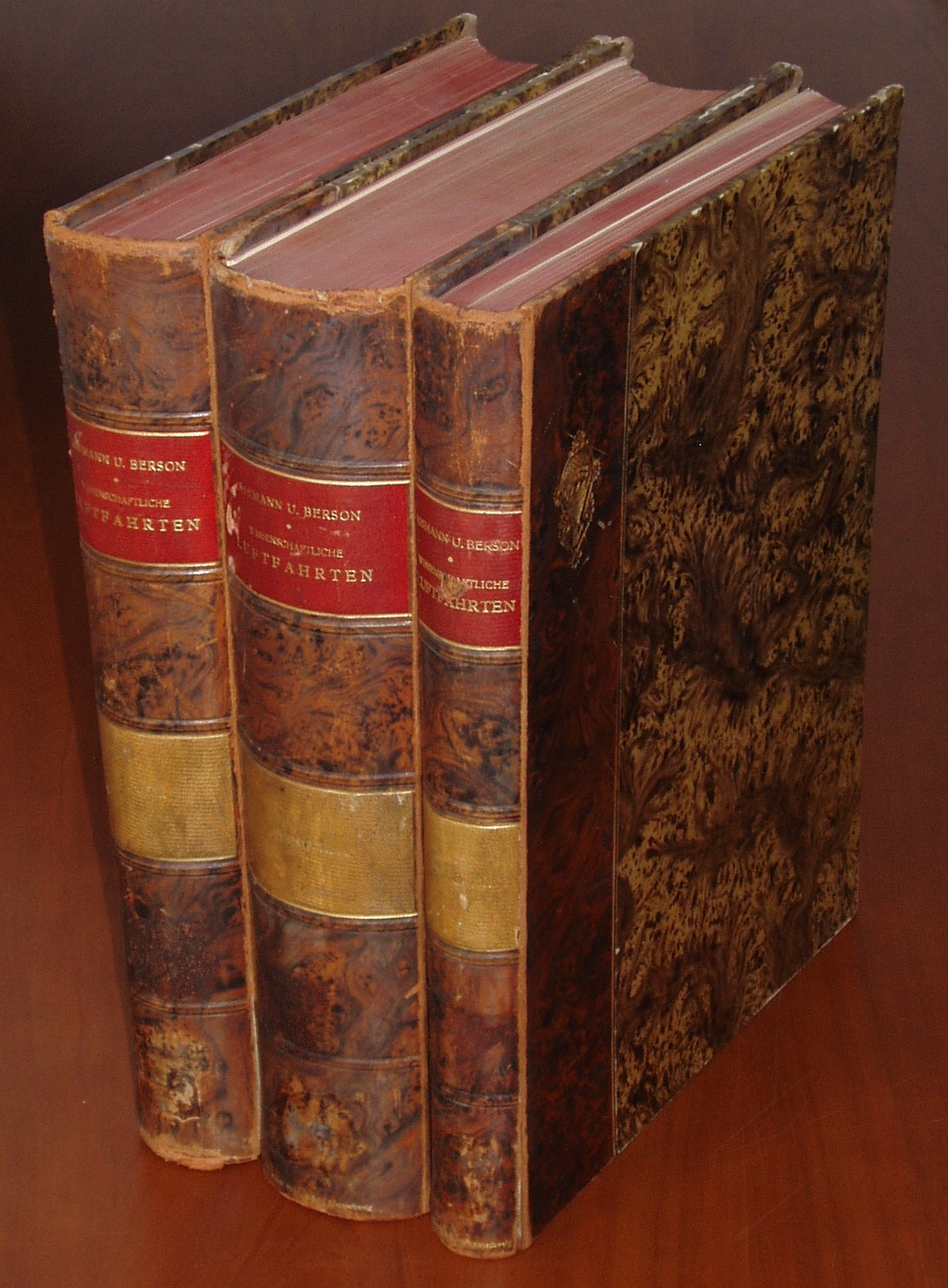
The three volumes of the Wissenschaftlichen Luftfahrten

Immediately after each individual flight, the results were published in journals such as Das Wetter, Zeitschrift für Luftschifffahrt und Physik der Atmosphäre and Meteorologische Zeitschrift. Berson and Aßmann alone were responsible for 12 and 18 articles respectively. A review after 49 flights was published by Aßmann in the Meteorologischen Zeitschrift in 1895.

A complete publication of the measurement data from all 94 manned and unmanned balloon flights, and an extensive scientific analysis and discussion was published in three volumes under the title Wissenschaftliche Luftfahrten ("Scientific Flights") in 1899 (volume 1) and 1900 (volumes 2 and 3). Aßmann and Berson served as editors. Other contributors included Baschin, von Bezold, Börnstein, Groß, Kremser, Stade and Süring. The work contains a historical overview of meteorological observations on earlier balloon flights, a description of the materials used to make the balloons, the instruments used, and measurement methods. It also contains detailed descriptions of each flight in tabular form, graphical illustrations, and reports from the pilots on the progress of each flight and the observers on their measurements. This filled half of the first volume and the whole second volume. The third contained the summary account and scientific discussion of the observational data, divided by temperature, distribution of water vapor, could formations, wind speed and direction, solar radiation, and air electricity. The work ends with a theoretical reflection by Bezold.

The first copy of Wissenschaftlichen Luftfahrten was presented to Kaiser Wilhelm II on 10 June 1900 by Bezold, Aßmann, Berson, and Hauptmann. In recognition of their services, the Kaiser appointed Bezold to the Geheimen Oberregierungsrat and Aßmann to the Geheimen Regierungsrat. Berson and Kremser received the Order of the Red Eagle (4th class), and Süring the Order of the Crown (4th class).

Wissenschaftlichen Luftfahrten was well received by the international community of aerologists. Hugo Hergesell, the president of the International Commission for Scientific Aviation, published a 20-page review in 1901. Viktor Silberer, president of the Wiener Aëro-Club, called it "by far the most important and comprehensive work that the aeronautical literature of all nations of Earth can boast of" in the Wiener Luftschiffer-Zeitung. The Royal Netherlands Academy of Arts and Sciences awarded Aßmann and Berson the Buys Ballot Medal in 1903, which was only award once per decade for outstanding service in the field of meteorology

== Literature ==
- Richard Aßmann, Arthur Berson (eds.): Wissenschaftliche Luftfahrten. Berlin: Deutschen Verein zur Förderung der Luftschifffahrt. 3 vols., Vieweg, Braunschweig 1899 (Vol. 1) / 1900 (Vols. 2 and 3).
- Karl-Heinz Bernhardt: Zur Erforschung der Atmosphäre mit dem Freiballon – die Berliner wissenschaftlichen Luftfahrten (1888–1899). In: Eckart Henning (ed.): Dahlemer Archivgespräche, Vol. 6, Archiv zur Geschichte der Max-Planck-Gesellschaft, Berlin 2000, pp. 52–82.
- Sabine Höhler: Luftfahrtforschung und Luftfahrtmythos. Wissenschaftliche Ballonfahrt in Deutschland, 1880–1910. In: Campus Forschung, vol. 792, Campus, Frankfurt am Main / New York, NY 2001, ISBN 3-593-36840-4 (also published as a dissertation by the Technischen Universität Braunschweig in 1999).
- Hermann Stade: 40 Jahre Berliner Verein für Luftschiffahrt, Berlin 1921.
