= Society for the Promotion of Aeronautics (Germany) =

Aviation Association

Founded on August 31, 1881, the Deutsche Verein zur Förderung der Luftschifffahrt, (Society for the Promotion of Aeronautics), was the first German aviation association.

== Founding ==
The motivation for the association arose from the experience of the massive French military balloon units during the Siege of Paris in the Franco-Prussian War of 1870/1871. The association's objects were to promote airship flight by all means, as well as to work on solving the problem of building steerable airships, and especially to support a permanent research station.

== Journal ==
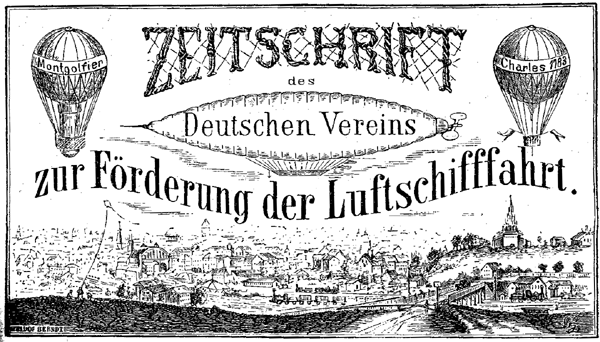
1882 title sheet of the association's technical journal

In 1882 the association started printing Zeitschrift des Deutschen Vereins zur Förderung der Luftschifffahrt, which was the first German technical aviation journal. In 1888 they printed under the title Zeitschrift für Luftschifffahrt (Journal of airshipflight) and the Vienese flight association Wiener Flugtechnische Verein became co-editors. In 1892 the title changed to Zeitschrift für Luftschifffahrt und Physik der Atmosphäre (Journal of airshipflight and atmospheric physics). In 1900 the association adopted the journal Illustrierte Aeronautische Mitteilungen (illustrated aeronautical reports), with the subtitle Deutsche Zeitschrift für Luftschifffahrt (German journal of airshipflight).

In 1903, after Germany saw the founding of numerous other aeronautical associations, it changed its name to Berliner Verein für Luftschifffahrt (Berlin association of airshipflight).

== Membership and activities ==
Among the members were: the airship pioneers Paul Haenlein, Friedrich Hermann Wölfert; the meteorologists Richard Aßmann, Arthur Berson and Reinhard Süring; the airship constructor Hans Bartsch von Sigsfeld and the flight researcher Otto Lilienthal.
