= Richard Börnstein =

German physicist and meteorologist

Richard Börnstein (9 January 1852 – 13 May 1913) was a German physicist and meteorologist.

Born into a Jewish family in Königsberg, he studied natural sciences at the University of Göttingen, and later on, worked as an assistant to Georg Hermann Quincke at the University of Heidelberg. In 1877 he obtained his habilitation at Heidelberg, and afterwards taught classes in experimental physics and meteorology at the Agricultural Academy in Proskau. From 1881 onward, he served as a professor at the Agricultural University of Berlin.

At the university in Berlin he established a meteorological station. He is also credited with the development of a pressure anemometer (1883) and making improvements in regards to rain gauge methodology. In 1883, with chemist Hans Heinrich Landolt, he published the first edition of the Physikalisch-Chemische Tabellen (now referred to as the "Landolt-Börnstein"; it contains more than 400 volumes of data from all areas of the physical sciences). He died in Berlin, aged 61.

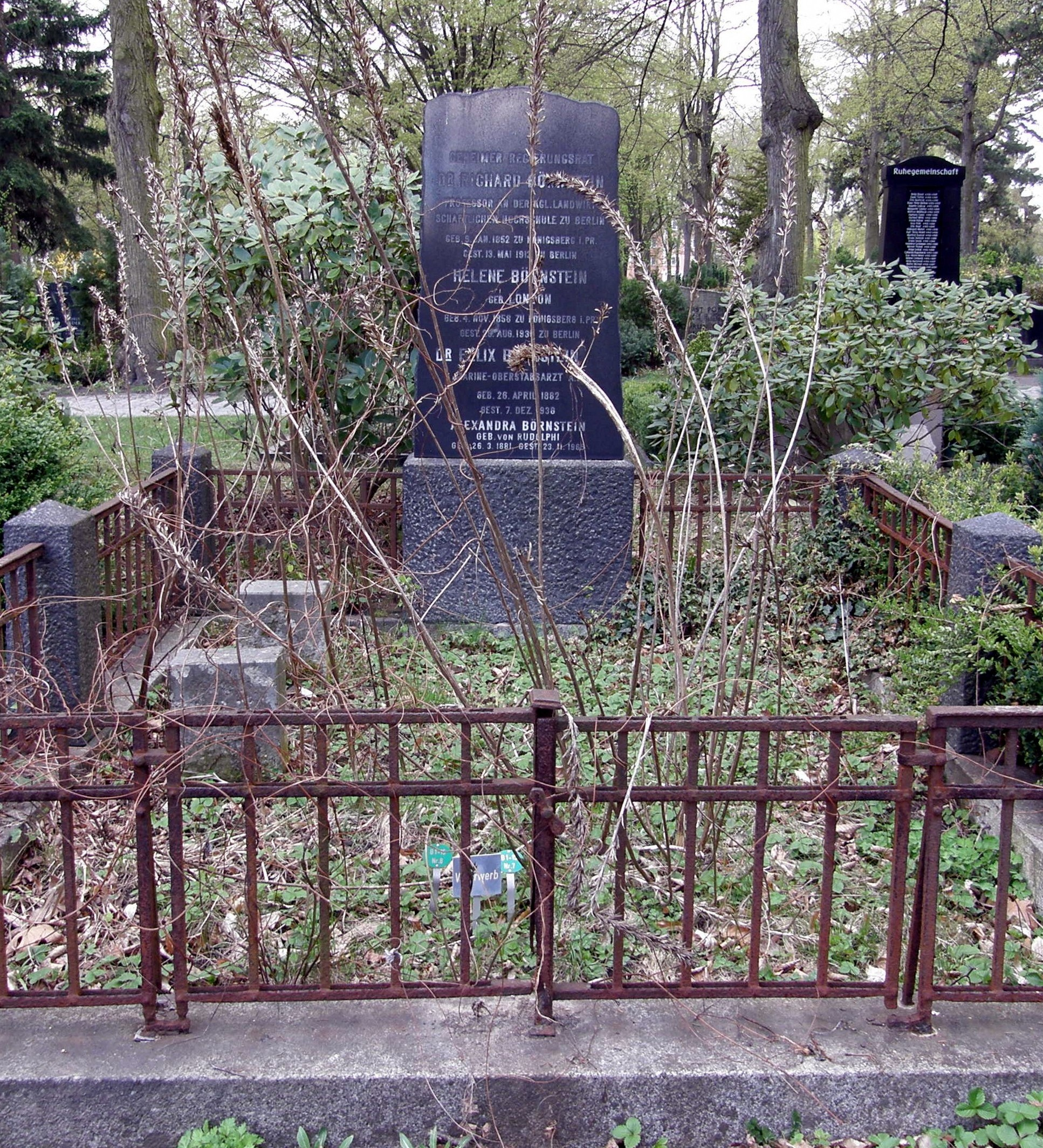
Grave of Richard Börnstein at Friedhof Wilmersdorf in Berlin

== Selected works ==
- Der Einfluss des Lichtes auf den elektrischen Leistungswiderstand von Metallen (habilitation thesis, 1877) – The influence of light on the electric power resistance of metals.
- Unterhaltungen über das Wetter, 1905 – Conversations about the weather.
- Sichtbare und unsichtbare Strahlen, 1905 – Visible and invisible rays.
- Die Lehre von der Wärme, 1907 – The theory of heat.
- Leitfaden der Wetterkunde, 1913 – Guide of meteorology.

He also made contributions to Richard Assmann's Wissenschaftliche Luftfahrten ("Scientific balloon rides", 1899–1900).

== See also ==
- Berlin scientific balloon flights
