= Aero Club =

Aero Club may refer to

- Society for the Promotion of Aeronautics (Germany), founded on 31 August 1881 in Germany as Deutscher Verein zur Förderung der Luftschifffahrt
- Aéro-Club de France, founded 20 October 1898
- Aero Club of Great Britain, founded in 1901
- Aero Club of America, formed in 1905, since 1923 National Aeronautic Association
- Fédération Aéronautique Internationale (FAI), founded on 14 October 1905
- or any modern Flying club
