= Pauline Morrow Austin =

American physicist and meteorologist

- Born: December 18, 1916; Kingsville, Texas
- Died: August 29, 2011 (aged 94); Gainesville, Florida
- Other name: Pauline Morrow
- Education: Wilson College; Smith College; Massachusetts Institute of Technology
- Spouse: James Murdoch Austin
- Children: Doris A. Price; Carol T. West
- Scientific career
- Workplaces: MIT Radiation Laboratory
- Thesis: Propagation of electromagnetic pulses in the ionosphere (1942)
- Doctoral advisor: Julius Stratton

Pauline "Polly" Morrow Austin (December 18, 1916 – August 29, 2011) was an American physicist and meteorologist known for her work on weather radar.

== Early life and education ==
Austin (nee Pauline Morrow) was born in 1916 in Kingsville, Texas. She was raised in Mexico and homeschooled for most of her childhood by her parents who were educational missionaries. However, for the sophomore and senior years of high school she attended North Avenue Presbyterian School in Atlanta, Georgia.

Austin received a BA in mathematics from Wilson College in 1938 where she was a student of Dorothy Weeks. She then went on to earn an MA from Smith College in 1939 and a PhD in Physics from MIT in 1942. At MIT, Austin was the student and protégé of Julius Stratton, an electrical engineer and later president of MIT. Austin's dissertation was on the theory of propagation of electromagnetic radiation through Earth's atmosphere.

== Career ==
Austin began her career in the MIT Radiation Laboratory, where she contributed to the development of Long Range Navigation (LORAN) and radar in World War II. She was praised in the New York Times on January 18, 1942, as one of nine women contributing wartime science and technology. Her work contributed to the then new application of radar to weather.

In 1946, she joined the newly formed MIT Weather Radar Project as the expert on electromagnetic theory. In this work she compared radar echoes to the amount of rainfall, improving the use of radar to predict weather patterns. In 1947 she became a founding and only woman member of the American Meteorological Society's Committee on Radar Meteorology. From 1956-1980 she directed the Weather Radar Project. During her time as Director, she taught radar meteorology and advised graduate students in the MIT Department of Meteorology (now part of the MIT Department of Earth, Atmospheric, and Planetary Sciences). Her research focused on the measurement of rain by radar and in 1974 her project deployed a shipborne radar to measure rainfall over the tropical ocean as part of the Global Atmospheric Research Program's Atlantic Tropical Experiment (GATE).

From 1953-1955, Austin also worked as a lecturer at Wellesley College.

== Personal life ==
Austin met James Murdoch Austin during graduate school at MIT. They wed in 1941 and remained at MIT, where he became a long-time Professor of Meteorology and an early television weather forecaster. Pauline collaborated with him for some of the earliest inclusion of radar observations in television weather reports. They had two daughters together: Doris A. Price of Annapolis, Maryland and Carol T. West of Gainesville, Florida.

After her husband's death in 2000, Austin moved to Gainesville, Florida, to be nearer to one of her daughters. Throughout most of her working and retired life, Austin was an avid golfer. In her later years, she volunteered at the Florida Museum of Natural History.

== Legacy ==
In 2016, Austin was memorialized with an exhibit in the Green Building at MIT, and in 2017, MIT produced a biographical video highlighting her career as one of the first women to earn a Ph.D. in physics from MIT.
