= Sandrine Bony =

French climatologist

Sandrine Bony-Léna
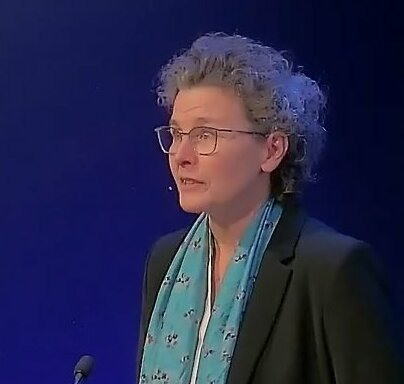
- 2023
- Born: Sandrine Bony

Academic background
- Education: Université Pierre-et-Marie-Curie (Diplôme national de doctorat)
- Doctoral advisor: Hervé Le Treut

Academic work
- Discipline: Climatologist, physicist
- Institutions: The Sorbonne, Centre national de la recherche scientifique
- Main interests: Clouds, human-induced climate change

Sandrine Bony-Léna, née Bony, is a French-born climatologist who is currently Director of research at the Centre National de la Recherche Scientifique (CNRS) at Sorbonne University, Paris. Bony was notably a lead author of the Nobel Prize-winning (2007) Fourth Assessment Report of the Intergovernmental Panel on Climate Change.

== Distinctions ==
- 2012: the Bernard Haurwitz Memorial Lecture prize awarded by the American Meteorological Society (AMS).
- 2017: the Gérard-Mégie prize of the Académie des Sciences.
- 2017: Chevalier de la Légion d'honneur.
- 2018: CNRS Silver Medal.
- 2023: Buys Ballot Medal

== Selected works ==
- Bony, Sandrine; Dufresne, Jean-Louis (2005). "Marine boundary layer clouds at the heart of tropical cloud feedback uncertainties in climate models". Geophysical Research Letters. 32 (20): L20806. Bibcode:2005GeoRL..3220806B. doi:10.1029/2005GL023851. S2CID 18266199.
- Bony, Sandrine; Dufresne, Jean-Louis; et al. (2004). "On dynamic and thermodynamic components of cloud changes". Climate Dynamics. 22 (2–3): 71–86. Bibcode:2004ClDy...22...71B. doi:10.1007/s00382-003-0369-6. S2CID 56077074.
- Bony, Sandrine; Emanuel, Kerry A (2005). "On the role of moist processes in tropical intraseasonal variability: Cloud-radiation and moisture-convection feedbacks". Journal of the Atmospheric Sciences. 62 (8): 2770–2789. Bibcode:2005JAtS...62.2770B. doi:10.1175/JAS3506.1.
- Bony, Sandrine; Stevens, Bjorn; et al. (2016). "Thermodynamic control of anvil cloud amount". Proc. Natl. Acad. Sci. U.S.A. 113 (32): 8927–8932. Bibcode:2016PNAS..113.8927B. doi:10.1073/pnas.1601472113. PMC 4987798. PMID 27412863.
- Bony, Sandrine; Stevens, Bjorn; et al. (2017). "EUREC(4)A: A Field Campaign to Elucidate the Couplings Between Clouds, Convection and Circulation". Surveys in Geophysics. 38 (6): 1529–1568. Bibcode:2017SGeo...38.1529B. doi:10.1007/s10712-017-9428-0. PMC 6956937. PMID 31997845.
- Marotzke, Jochem; Jakob, Christian; Bony, Sandrine; Dirmeyer, Paul A.; O'Gorman, Paul A.; Hawkins, Ed; Perkins-Kirkpatrick, Sarah; Quéré, Corinne Le; Nowicki, Sophie; Paulavets, Katsia; Seneviratne, Sonia I. (February 2017). "Climate research must sharpen its view". Nature Climate Change. 7 (2): 89–91. Bibcode:2017NatCC...7...89M. doi:10.1038/nclimate3206. ISSN 1758-6798. PMC 5871430. PMID 29599824.
- Bony, Sandrine; Stevens, Bjorn; Frierson, Dargan M. W.; Jakob, Christian; Kageyama, Masa; Pincus, Robert; Shepherd, Theodore G.; Sherwood, Steven C.; Siebesma, A. Pier; Sobel, Adam H.; Watanabe, Masahiro (April 2015). "Clouds, circulation and climate sensitivity". Nature Geoscience. 8 (4): 261–268. Bibcode:2015NatGe...8..261B. doi:10.1038/ngeo2398. ISSN 1752-0908. S2CID 29427100.
- Sherwood, Steven C.; Bony, Sandrine; Dufresne, Jean-Louis (January 2014). "Spread in model climate sensitivity traced to atmospheric convective mixing". Nature. 505 (7481): 37–42. Bibcode:2014Natur.505...37S. doi:10.1038/nature12829. hdl:1959.4/unsworks_13600. ISSN 1476-4687. PMID 24380952. S2CID 205236718.
- Overpeck, Jonathan T.; Meehl, Gerald A.; Bony, Sandrine; Easterling, David R. (11 February 2011). "Climate Data Challenges in the 21st Century". Science. 331 (6018): 700–702. Bibcode:2011Sci...331..700O. doi:10.1126/science.1197869. ISSN 0036-8075. PMID 21311006. S2CID 206529954.

== Sources ==
- https://www.ipcc.ch/
- La prévision du climat est-elle fiable ? (lemonde.fr) 02 juin 2013
