= Edward Norton Lorenz =

American mathematician (1917–2008)

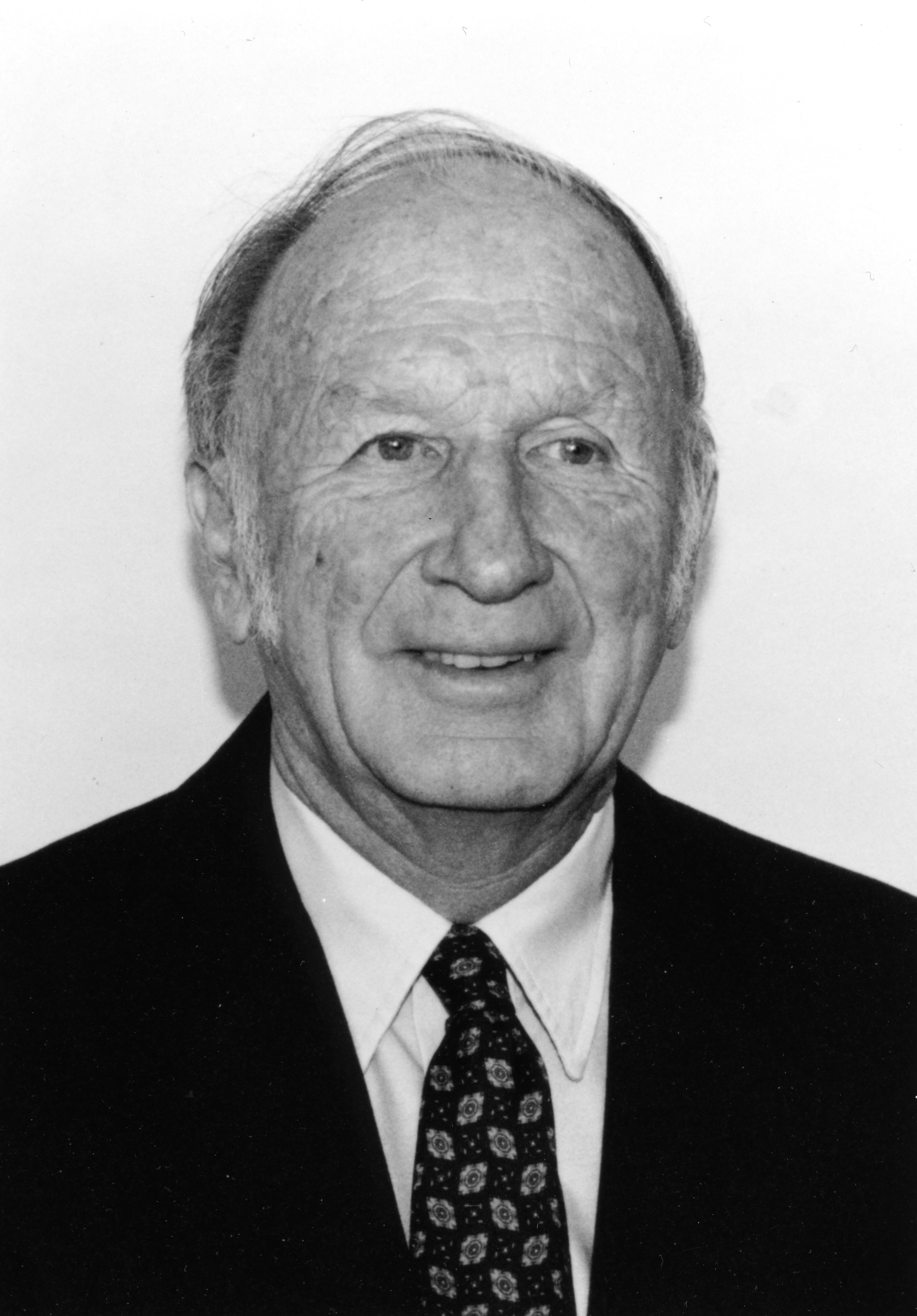
- Born: May 23, 1917; West Hartford, Connecticut, U.S.
- Died: April 16, 2008 (aged 90); Cambridge, Massachusetts, U.S.
- Education: Dartmouth College (BA); Harvard University (MA); Massachusetts Institute of Technology (MS, ScD)
- Known for: Chaos theory; Butterfly effect; Logistic map; Lorenz map; Lorenz attractor; Lorenz energy cycle; Lorenz 96 model
- Awards: Symons Gold Medal (1973); Crafoord Prize (1983); Kyoto Prize (1991); Roger Revelle Medal (1992); Buys Ballot Medal (2004); Lomonosov Gold Medal (2004)
- Scientific career
- Fields: Mathematics; Meteorology
- Workplaces: Massachusetts Institute of Technology
- Thesis: A Method of Applying the Hydrodynamic and Thermodynamic Equations to Atmospheric Models (1948)
- Doctoral advisor: James Murdoch Austin
- Doctoral students: Kevin E. Trenberth; William D. Sellers

Edward Norton Lorenz (May 23, 1917 – April 16, 2008) was an American mathematician and meteorologist who established the theoretical basis of weather and climate predictability, as well as the basis for computer-aided atmospheric physics and meteorology. He founded modern chaos theory, a branch of mathematics focusing on the behavior of dynamical systems that are highly sensitive to initial conditions.

His discovery of deterministic chaos "profoundly influenced a wide range of basic sciences and brought about one of the most dramatic changes in mankind's view of nature since Sir Isaac Newton", according to the committee that awarded him the 1991 Kyoto Prize for basic sciences in the field of earth and planetary sciences.

== Early life ==
Lorenz was born in 1917 in West Hartford, Connecticut. He acquired an early love of science from both sides of his family. His father, Edward Henry Lorenz (1882–1956), majored in mechanical engineering at the Massachusetts Institute of Technology, and his maternal grandfather, Lewis M. Norton, developed the first course in chemical engineering at MIT in 1888. Meanwhile, his mother, Grace Peloubet Norton (1887–1943), instilled in Lorenz a deep interest in games, particularly chess.

== Education ==
Lorenz received a bachelor's degree in mathematics from Dartmouth College in 1938 and a master's degree in mathematics from Harvard in 1940. He worked as a weather forecaster for the United States Army Air Forces during World War II, leading him to pursue graduate studies in meteorology at the Massachusetts Institute of Technology. He earned both a master's and doctoral degree in meteorology from MIT in 1943 and 1948.

His doctoral dissertation, titled "A Method of Applying the Hydrodynamic and Thermodynamic Equations to Atmospheric Models" and written under advisor James Murdoch Austin, described an application of fluid dynamical equations to the practical problem of predicting the motion of storms.

== Scientific career ==
Lorenz spent the entirety of his scientific career at the Massachusetts Institute of Technology. In 1948, he joined the MIT Department of Meteorology as a research scientist. In 1955, he became an assistant professor in the department and was promoted to professor in 1962. From 1977 to 1981, Lorenz served as head of the Department of Meteorology at MIT. In 1983, the MIT Department of Meteorology and Physical Oceanography merged with the Department of Geology to become the current MIT Department of Earth, Atmospheric and Planetary Sciences, where Lorenz remained a professor before becoming an emeritus professor in 1987.

=== Atmospheric circulation ===
In the late 1940s and early 1950s, Lorenz worked with Victor Starr on the General Circulation Project at MIT to understand the role the weather system played in determining the energetics of the general circulation of the atmosphere. From this work, in 1967, Lorenz published a landmark paper, titled "The Nature and Theory of the General Circulation of the Atmosphere", on atmospheric circulation from an energetic perspective, which advanced the concept of available potential energy.

=== Numerical weather prediction ===
In the 1950s, Lorenz became interested in and started work on numerical weather prediction, which relied on computers to forecast weather by processing observational data on such things as temperature, pressure, and wind. This interest was sparked, in part, after a visit to the Institute for Advanced Study in Princeton, New Jersey, where he met Jule Charney, then head of the IAS's Meteorological Research Group and a leading dynamical meteorologist at the time. (Charney would later join Lorenz at MIT in 1957 as a professor of meteorology.) In 1953, Lorenz took over leadership of a project at MIT that ran complex simulations of weather models that he used to evaluate statistical forecasting techniques. By the late 1950s, Lorenz was skeptical of the appropriateness of the linear statistical models in meteorology, as most atmospheric phenomena involved in weather forecasting are non-linear. It was during this time that his discovery of deterministic chaos came about.

=== Chaos theory ===
In 1961, Lorenz, with the assistance of Margaret Hamilton, was using a simple digital computer, a Royal McBee LGP-30, to simulate weather patterns by modeling 12 variables, representing things like temperature and wind speed. He wanted to see a sequence of data again, and to save time, he started the simulation in the middle of its course. He did this by entering a printout of the data that corresponded to conditions in the middle of the original simulation. To his surprise, the weather that the machine began to predict was completely different from the previous calculation. The culprit was a rounded decimal number on the computer printout. The computer worked with 6-digit precision, but the printout rounded variables off to a 3-digit number, so a value like 0.506127 printed as 0.506. This difference is tiny, and the consensus at the time would have been that it should have no practical effect. However, Lorenz discovered that small changes in initial conditions produced large changes in long-term results.

Lorenz's discovery, which gave its name to Lorenz attractors, showed that even detailed atmospheric modelling cannot, in general, make precise long-term weather predictions. His work on the topic, assisted by Ellen Fetter, culminated in the publication of his 1963 paper "Deterministic Nonperiodic Flow" in Journal of the Atmospheric Sciences, and with it, the foundation of chaos theory. He states in that paper:

Two states differing by imperceptible amounts may eventually evolve into two considerably different states ... If, then, there is any error whatever in observing the present state—and in any real system such errors seem inevitable—an acceptable prediction of an instantaneous state in the distant future may well be impossible ... In view of the inevitable inaccuracy and incompleteness of weather observations, precise very-long-range forecasting would seem to be nonexistent.

His description of the butterfly effect, the idea that small changes can have large consequences, followed in 1969.

In the book "The Essence of Chaos", in the chapter "Our Chaotic Weather" from 1993, authored by Edward Lorenz and Krzysztof Haman, the authors delved into the challenges of weather forecasting. The work discusses the consequences of chaos in the atmosphere and its impact on weather prediction. They describe a scenario in which meteorologists, in the computer age, generate multiple long-term weather forecasts based on different yet similar initial atmospheric conditions. Differences in the forecast results arise due to the sensitivity of the system to initial conditions.

Lorenz's insights on deterministic chaos resonated widely starting in the 1970s and 1980s, when it spurred new fields of study in virtually every branch of science, from biology to geology to physics. In meteorology, it led to the conclusion that it may be fundamentally impossible to predict weather beyond two or three weeks with a reasonable degree of accuracy. However, the recognition of chaos has led to improvements in weather forecasting, as now forecasters recognize that measurements are imperfect and thus run many simulations starting from slightly different conditions, called ensemble forecasting.

Of the seminal significance of Lorenz's work, Kerry Emanuel, a prominent meteorologist and climate scientist at MIT, has stated:

By showing that certain deterministic systems have formal predictability limits, Ed put the last nail in the coffin of the Cartesian universe and fomented what some have called the third scientific revolution of the 20th century, following on the heels of relativity and quantum physics.

Late in his career, Lorenz began to be recognized with international accolades for the importance of his work on deterministic chaos. In 1983, along with colleague Henry Stommel, he was awarded the Crafoord Prize from the Swedish Academy of Sciences, considered to be nearly equal to a Nobel Prize. He was also awarded the Kyoto Prize for basic sciences in the field of earth and planetary sciences in 1991, the Buys Ballot Award in 2004, and the Tomassoni Award in 2008. In 2018, a short documentary was made about Lorenz's immense scientific legacy on everything from how we predict weather to our understanding of the universe.

A reprint book containing invited papers on butterfly effects was published to celebrate the 50th anniversary of the metaphorical butterfly effect.

== Personal life and death ==
Later in life, Lorenz lived in Cambridge, Massachusetts with his wife, Jane Loban (1919–2001), and their three children: Nancy, Cheryl, and Edward.

He was an avid outdoorsman, who enjoyed hiking, climbing, and cross-country skiing. He kept up with these pursuits until very late in his life. On April 16, 2008, Lorenz died at his home in Cambridge from cancer at the age of 90.

== Legacy ==
Lorenz is remembered by colleagues and friends for his quiet demeanor, gentle humility, and love of nature. He was described as "a genius with a soul of an artist" by his close friend and collaborator Jule Charney.

=== The Lorenz Center ===
In 2011, The Lorenz Center, a climate think tank devoted to fundamental scientific inquiry, was founded at MIT in honor of Lorenz and his pioneering work on chaos theory and climate science.

=== Centenary celebration ===
In February 2018, The Edward Lorenz Center and Henry Houghton Fund hosted a symposium, named MIT on Chaos and Climate, in honor of the 100th anniversary of the birth of Lorenz and Charney. The two-day event featured presentations from world-renowned experts on the many scientific contributions that the two pioneers made on the fields of numerical weather prediction, physical oceanography, atmospheric dynamics, and experimental fluid dynamics, as well as the personal legacy they left behind of integrity, optimism, and collaboration. A video produced for the event highlights the indelible mark made by Charney and Lorenz on MIT and the field of meteorology as a whole.

== Publications ==
Lorenz published many books and articles, a selection of which can be found below. A more complete list can be found on the Lorenz Center website.

- 1955 Available potential energy and the maintenance of the general circulation. Tellus. Vol. 7; 2.
- 1963 Deterministic nonperiodic flow. Journal of the Atmospheric Sciences. Vol. 20; 130–141.
- 1967 The nature and theory of the general circulation of atmosphere. World Meteorological Organization. Vol. 218.
- 1969 Three approaches to atmospheric predictability. Bulletin of the American Meteorological Society. Vol. 50; 345–349..
- 1972 Predictability: Does the Flap of a Butterfly's Wings in Brazil Set Off a Tornado in Texas? American Association for the Advancement of Sciences, 139th meeting..
- 1976 Nondeterministic theories of climate change. Quaternary Research. Vol. 6.
- 1990 Can chaos and intransitivity lead to interannual variability? Tellus. Vol. 42A.
- 2005 Designing Chaotic Models. Journal of the Atmospheric Sciences. Vol. 62, No. 5; 1574–1587.

== Awards ==
- 1969 Carl-Gustaf Rossby Research Medal, American Meteorological Society
- 1973 Symons Gold Medal, Royal Meteorological Society
- 1975 Fellow, National Academy of Sciences (U.S.A.)
- 1981 Member, Norwegian Academy of Science and Letters
- 1983 Crafoord Prize, Royal Swedish Academy of Sciences
- 1984 Honorary Member, Royal Meteorological Society
- 1989 Elliott Cresson Medal, The Franklin Institute
- 1991 Kyoto Prize for "his boldest scientific achievement in discovering 'deterministic chaos'".
- 1992 Roger Revelle Medal
- 2000 International Meteorological Organization Prize from World Meteorological Organization
- 2004 Buys Ballot Medal of the Royal Netherlands Academy of Arts and Sciences.
- 2004 Lomonosov Gold Medal of the Russian Academy of Sciences
- 2008 Felice Pietro Chisesi e Caterina Tomassoni award

== See also ==
- Arctic oscillation
- Attractor
- Chaos theory
- Ensemble forecasting
- Extratropical cyclone
- Experimental mathematics
- Meteorology
- Numerical weather prediction
- Slow manifold
- Jule Gregory Charney
