= Hans Heinrich Landolt =

Swiss chemist (1831-1910)

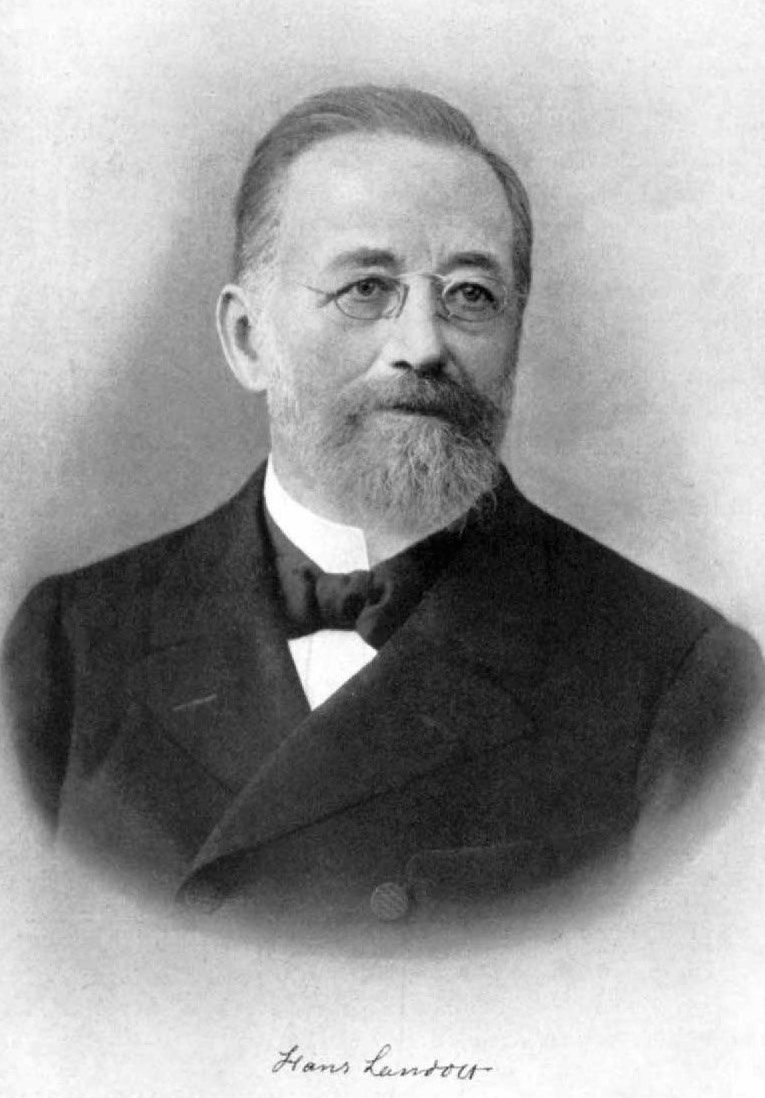
- Hans Heinrich Landolt
- Born: 5 December 1831; Zurich, Switzerland
- Died: 15 March 1910 (aged 78); Berlin-Wilmersdorf, Germany
- Known for: Discovery of iodine clock reaction. Experimentally verified the law of conservation of mass and energy.
- Scientific career
- Fields: Chemistry

Hans Heinrich Landolt (5 December 1831 – 15 March 1910) was a Swiss chemist who discovered iodine clock reaction. He is also one of the founders of Landolt–Börnstein database. He tested law of mass conservation which was given by Lavoisier.

== Biography ==
Landolt was born in Zurich and at the age of nineteen entered the university there to study chemistry and physics. He attended the lectures of Carl Jacob Löwig and published his first work on stibmethyl in Schriften der Naturforschenden Gesellschaft (Writings of the Natural Science Society). He was then appointed assistant to Lowig and followed him in 1853 to Breslau. The same year he obtained the degree of Doctor of Philosophy with a thesis "Ueber die Arsenäthyle" (On ethyl compounds of arsenic) which was a notable contribution to the law of chemical valence. After the defense, he went to Berlin to attend lectures of Eilhard Mitscherlich, Rose, Johannes Muller and Dubois. Facilities for experimental research in chemistry were practically non-existent in Berlin at the time, and therefore Landolt left for Heidelberg for a newly founded institute of Robert Bunsen. After devoting himself for a short time to the electrolytic production of calcium and lithium, Landolt started an investigation of the gases produced in the Bunsen burner, which had been constructed in the winter of 1854–55.

In 1856 Landolt returned to Breslau, where he was soon afterwards joined by Lothar Meyer and Friedrich Konrad Beilstein. In the same year he became a lecturer in chemistry on the strength of his monograph on "Chemische Vorgange in der Flamme der Leuchtgase" (Chemical processes in the flame of illuminating gases). In 1857, he was called to Bonn where he studied the effect of the atomic composition of liquids containing carbon, hydrogen and oxygen on the transmission of light. The results were published in 1862–1864 and were a continuation of the previous researches of John Hall Gladstone. Later in his life he elaborated the work of Hertz (1887–1888) and demonstrated that light waves are differentiated from electric waves merely by the wavelength, and in 1892 he extended his early work to measurements of the molecular refractivity of organic substances for radiowaves.

At Bonn, in 1859, Landolt married Milla Schallenberg, the daughter of Swiss parents settled in Bonn. In 1869, he was appointed to the head of the newly founded technical college at Aachen, where a chemical institute was built according to his plans. His work there was concerned with the relations between physical properties and chemical constitution. In particular, he made use of polarized light and studied optical rotation by various chemicals. In 1880, he was called by the Prussian Ministry of Agriculture to the newly founded Agricultural College in Berlin, where he remained until 1891. There he constructed new laboratories and collaborated with Richard Börnstein in the compilation of the "Physikalisch-chemischen Tabellen" (Physical-chemical Tables). Their third edition was published in 1905 with the assistance of Wilhelm Meyerhoffer and a generous financial support by the Berlin Academy of Sciences.

Iodine clock reaction.

In 1882 Landolt became a member of the Berlin Academy. Around that time he made highly remarkable investigations into the kinetics of the iodine clock reaction between iodic acid and sulfurous acid. From 1891 till his retirement in 1905, he served as director of the second chemical institute of the Berlin University. There he worked on three major problems: (i) relation between the melting point and molecular weight, (ii) effect of crystallinity on the optical rotation and (iii) change in weight during chemical reactions. The negative result for the last experiments was regarded as an accurate experimental confirmation of the conservation laws of mass and energy.

Landolt was known for his humor, friendliness, punctuality and cigar. He was fit and worked as usual until the week before his death, when he had a sudden failure of heart and kidney. He was buried, in accordance with his desire, at Bonn where he spent most memorable years of his life.
