= Sarah Gille =

Physical oceanographer

Sarah Tragler Gille

Academic background
- Education: Massachusetts Institute of Technology (Ph.D.)
- Thesis: Dynamics of the Antarctic Circumpolar Current: Evidence for Topographic Effects from Altimeter Data and Numerical Model Output (1995)

Academic work
- Discipline: Oceanography
- Sub-discipline: Physical oceanography of the Southern Ocean
- Institutions: University of California, Irvine; University of California, San Diego; Scripps Institution of Oceanography
- Website: sgille.scrippsprofiles.ucsd.edu

Sarah Gille is a physical oceanographer at Scripps Institution of Oceanography known for her research on the role of the Southern Ocean in the global climate system.

== Early life and education ==
The daughter of John Gille and Ellen Fetter Gille, Sarah Gille earned an undergraduate B.S. from Yale University in 1988, and a Ph.D. in 1995 in a Massachusetts Institute of Technology-Woods Hole Oceanographic Institution Joint Program. Her Ph.D. research, which was advised by Kathryn A. Kelly, used satellites to measured spatial and temporal variability in sea surface heights in the Southern Ocean, including modeling of those data.

After her doctoral work, Gille trained further as a postdoctoral investigator at Scripps Institution of Oceanography and the University of East Anglia.

== Career ==
Gille eventually accepted a faculty position at the University of California, Irvine. In 2000 she moved back to the University of California, San Diego where, as of 2024 she is jointly affiliated with Scripps Institution of Oceanography and the department of mechanical and aerospace engineering.

== Research ==
Gille's research centers on the Southern Ocean where she works on air-sea exchange and historical changes in climate in the region. Gille uses floats to study the movement of water masses in the Southern Ocean, and combined data from the 1990s in the Southern Ocean with historical data to identify warming at mid-depths that was concentrated within the Antarctic Circumpolar Current. Gille's research includes measuring winds from space using the QuickSCAT platform, and assimilating tracer and float data from the Southern Ocean into global models.

As of December 2021, Gille remained a principal investigator of the historically NSF-funded "Diapycnal and Isopycnic Mixing Experiment in the Southern Ocean" (DIMES), a field program of the United States and the United Kingdom to measure isopycnal (horizontal) and diapycnal (vertical) mixing of the waters of the Southern Ocean, along with studying the tilting isopycnals of the Antarctic Circumpolar Current. "Tilting isopycnals" refer to oceanic water masses with the same density that tilt or slope with depth. In the ocean, the density of water changes due to variations in temperature and salinity, leading to the formation of surfaces of constant density, known as isopycnals. Tilting isopycnals indicate a change in the density structure of the ocean and can have an impact on ocean circulation and the transport of heat, salt, and other properties. As of December 2021, Gille was also a process studies investigator at the Southern Ocean Carbon and Climate Observations and Modeling project (SOCCOM), which aims to characterize the Southern Ocean's influence on global climate. SOCCOM is based in the High Meadows Environmental Institute (previously the Princeton Environmental Institute) at Princeton University and funded by the National Science Foundation.

=== Selected publications ===
- Kelly, Kathryn A.; Gille, Sarah T. (1990). "Gulf Stream surface transport and statistics at 69°W from the Geosat altimeter". Journal of Geophysical Research: Oceans. 95 (C3): 3149–3161. Bibcode:1990JGR....95.3149K. doi:10.1029/JC095iC03p03149. ISSN 2156-2202. Archived from the original on 2021-12-10.
- Gille, Sarah T. (1994). "Mean sea surface height of the Antarctic Circumpolar Current from Geosat data: Method and application". Journal of Geophysical Research: Oceans. 99 (C9): 18255–18273. Bibcode:1994JGR....9918255G. doi:10.1029/94JC01172. ISSN 2156-2202.
- Gille, S. T. (15 February 2002). "Warming of the Southern Ocean Since the 1950s". Science. 295 (5558): 1275–1277. Bibcode:2002Sci...295.1275G. doi:10.1126/science.1065863. PMID 11847337. S2CID 31434936.
- Gille, Sarah T. (15 September 2008). "Decadal-Scale Temperature Trends in the Southern Hemisphere Ocean". Journal of Climate. 21 (18): 4749–4765. Bibcode:2008JCli...21.4749G. doi:10.1175/2008JCLI2131.1. S2CID 7982458.
- Jones, Julie M.; Gille, Sarah T.; Goosse, Hugues; Abram, Nerilie J.; Canziani, Pablo O.; Charman, Dan J.; Clem, Kyle R.; Crosta, Xavier; de Lavergne, Casimir; Eisenman, Ian; England, Matthew H. (2016). "Assessing recent trends in high-latitude Southern Hemisphere surface climate". Nature Climate Change. 6 (10): 917–926. Bibcode:2016NatCC...6..917J. doi:10.1038/nclimate3103. hdl:10871/24938. ISSN 1758-678X. S2CID 26866623. Archived from the original on 2021-08-03.
- Swart, Neil C.; Gille, Sarah T.; Fyfe, John C. & Gillett, Nathan P. (2018). "Recent Southern Ocean Warming and Freshening Driven by Greenhouse Gas Emissions and Ozone Depletion". Nature Geoscience. 11 (11): 836–841. Bibcode:2018NatGe..11..836S. doi:10.1038/s41561-018-0226-1. S2CID 135193051. Archived from the original on 14 December 2021.
- Morrow, Rosemary; Fu, Lee-Lueng; Ardhuin, Fabrice; Benkiran, Mounir; Chapron, Bertrand; Cosme, Emmanuel; d’Ovidio, Francesco; Farrar, J. T.; Gille, S. T.; Lapeyre, Guillaume; Le Traon, Pierre-Yves; Pascual, Ananda; Ponte, Aurélien; Qiu, Bo; Rascle, Nicolas; Ubelmann, Clement; Wang, Jinbo; Zaron, E. D. (2019). "Global observations of fine-scale ocean surface topography with the surface water and ocean topography (SWOT) mission". Frontiers in Marine Science. 6 (1): 232. Bibcode:2019FrMaS...6..232M. doi:10.3389/fmars.2019.00232. hdl:1912/24301. Archived from the original on 10 December 2021.

== Selected awards and honors ==
While in graduate school, Gille received the 1995 Carl-Gustav Rossby Award of the Massachusetts Institute of Technology. In 2000, as a faculty member, she received the Zeldovich Award from the Committee on Space Research and the Russian Academy of Sciences.

In 2021, Gille was recipient of the Sverdrup Gold Medal of the American Meteorological Society.

Gille was named a Fellow of the American Geophysical Union (AGU) in 2015, and of the American Meteorological Society in 2021. The 2015 AGU announcement cited her "for exceptional contributions to advancing the understanding of the dynamics of the Southern Ocean and its role in the climate system".
