= Lewis M. Norton =

Lewis Norton (1855–1893) was an American academic who introduced the first four-year undergraduate chemical engineering program while teaching at Massachusetts Institute of Technology in 1888. He was the grandfather of mathematician Edward Norton Lorenz.
