= Hugo Hergesell =

German meteorologist (1859–1938)

Hugo Emil Hergesell
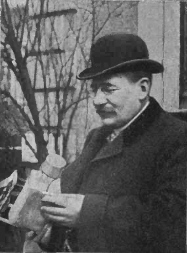
- Born: May 29, 1859; Bromberg
- Died: June 6, 1938 (aged 79); Berlin
- Occupation: Meteorologist

Hugo Emil Hergesell (29 May 1859 in Bromberg – 6 June 1938 in Berlin) was a German meteorologist.

== Works ==
- He co-founded "Beiträge zur Physik der freien Atmosphäre" (1904-; with Richard Assmann)
- Ergebnisse aerologischer Beobachtungen an internationalen Tagen, 1900–1913, 1925–1928

== Awards ==
- 1913 Buys Ballot Medal of the Royal Netherlands Academy of Arts and Sciences
- 1928 Symons Gold Medal of the Royal Meteorological Society.
