= Buys Ballot Medal =

The Buys Ballot Medal is a prize given out by the Royal Netherlands Academy of Arts and Sciences. It was instituted in 1888 to honour the achievements of the Dutch meteorologist C.H.D. Buys Ballot. The prize is awarded approximately every ten years to an individual that has made significant contributions to meteorology.

The recipients have been:

- 1893 – Julius von Hann, Austria
- 1903 – Richard Assmann and Arthur Berson, Germany
- 1913 – Hugo Hergesell, Germany
- 1923 – Sir Napier Shaw, United Kingdom
- 1933 – Vilhelm Bjerknes, Norway
- 1948 – Sverre Petterssen, Norway
- 1953 – Gustav Swoboda, Czech Republic
- 1963 – Erik Palmén, Finland
- 1973 – Joseph Smagorinsky, United States
- 1982 – Aksel C. Wiin-Nielsen, Denmark
- 1995 – Veerabhadran Ramanathan, United States
- 2004 – Edward Norton Lorenz, United States
- 2014 – Sir Brian Hoskins, United Kingdom
- 2023 – Sandrine Bony, France

== See also ==
- List of meteorology awards
