= Ellen Fetter =

American computer scientist and chaos theory researcher

Ellen Cole Fetter
- Education: New Trier High School; Mount Holyoke College
- Known for: Chaos theory
- Scientific career
- Workplaces: Massachusetts Institute of Technology; Florida State University

Ellen Cole Fetter Gille is an American computer scientist. She worked with Edward Norton Lorenz on chaos theory.

== Early life and education ==
Fetter was born to Frank Whitson Fetter and Elizabeth Garrett Pollard. Her mother created an endowment for chamber music at Swarthmore College, which has been supported by successive generations of her family. Fetter attended the Ecole Préalpina in Chexbres, Switzerland and New Trier High School, from which she graduated in 1957. She studied mathematics at Mount Holyoke College and graduated in 1961.

== Career ==
In 1961, Fetter interviewed with a member of the team who used a LGP-30 in MIT's Department of Nuclear Engineering, who recommended her to Margaret Hamilton. Hamilton soon moved on to another project, and Fetter took over the computational work for Edward Lorenz's research, plotting the motion of a particle experiencing fast convection in an idealised beaker. The work was the foundation of chaos theory. Fetter's contribution was acknowledged by Lorenz "Special thanks are due to Miss Ellen Fetter for handling the many numerical computations" in his frequently referenced paper.

In 1963, Fetter married John Gille, who was studying geophysics at MIT. They moved to Florida State University, where she worked on programming for several years. In the 1970s, she and her husband moved to Colorado, where Gille is now a senior scientist emeritus at the National Center for Atmospheric Research. Fetter took computer science classes at the University of Colorado Boulder, but soon left to work in tax preparation.

Fetter's daughter, Sarah Gille, studied physics at Yale University. She now works in physical oceanography at the University of California, San Diego.
