= Aksel C. Wiin-Nielsen =

- Born: 17 December 1924; Denmark
- Died: 26 April 2010 (aged 85); Denmark
- Known for: Atmospheric dynamics, atmospheric energetics
- Awards: Buys Ballot Medal, Wihuri International Prize, Honorary Member of the EGS, Honorary Member and Fellow of the AMS, Honorary Member of the RMetS, Member of the Royal Swedish Academy of Sciences, Class for Geosciences
- Scientific career
- Fields: Meteorology
- Workplaces: University of Copenhagen, University of Michigan

Aksel C. Wiin-Nielsen (17 December 1924 – 26 April 2010) was a Danish professor of meteorology at University of Copenhagen, University of Michigan, Director of the European Centre for Medium-Range Weather Forecasts (ECMWF), and Secretary-General of the World Meteorological Organization (WMO).

== Career ==
Wiin-Nielsen's meteorological career began in 1952 at the University of Copenhagen as scientific assistant to Professor Ragnar Fjørtoft. He later moved to next took him to the Institute of Meteorology at Stockholm, which had been set up by Carl-Gustaf Rossby in 1947. Here he participated in the first numerical prediction that completed its computation ahead of the time for which the forecast was made. In 1959 he moved to the US for fifteen years, beginning at the Joint Numerical Weather Prediction Unit, run by the U.S. Weather Bureau, the U.S. Air Force, and the U.S. Navy. In 1961 he accepted an offer to work at the National Center for Atmospheric Research (NCAR) in Boulder, Colorado, where his research focused on the general circulation of the atmosphere. Moving to the University of Michigan in 1963, he set up the meteorology department that later expanded to include oceanography and aeronomy, remaining there for ten years and building the department into a center for research in dynamical meteorology and the general circulation of the atmosphere.

In 1973 the European Centre for Medium-Range Weather Forecasts (ECMWF) was formed, and Wiin-Nielsen was appointed as its first director in January 1974. In 1979, the 8th World Meteorological Congress appointed him to be the United Nations' World Meteorological Organization's third secretary-general, so he left ECMWF at the end of that year. He served from 1 January 1980 to 31 December 1983. From 1975 to 1979 he was chairman of The International Commission on Dynamical Meteorology established in its current form by the International Association of Meteorology and Atmospheric Physics (IAMAP) (now the International Association of Meteorology and Atmospheric Sciences, IAMAS) at its plenary session in Zurich, Switzerland in 1967. Wiin-Nielsen also served as president of the European Geophysical Society (EGS, now the European Geosciences Union) from 1990 to 1992 and as director of the Danish Meteorological Institute.

== Publications ==
Wiin-Nielsen has published more than one hundred peer-reviewed papers in various scientific journals. Well known is

- Aksel C. Wiin-Nielsen and Tsing-Chang Chen (1993) Fundamentals of Atmospheric Energetics. Oxford University Press, 400 pp.

== Awards and honors ==
- Buys Ballot Medal of the Royal Netherlands Academy of Arts and Sciences (1982)
- Wihuri International Prize (1983)
- Honorary Member of the European Geophysical Society (EGS) in recognition of his exceptional and wide-ranging contributions to research and education in meteorology and of his invaluable efforts in support of the European Geophysical Society (1998)
- Honorary Member of the Royal Meteorological Society (RMetS)
- Honorary Member of the American Meteorological Society (AMS)
- AMS Fellow
- Member of the Royal Swedish Academy of Sciences, Class for Geosciences
- 2011 Awarded International Meteorological Organization Prize from the World Meteorological Organization.
