= Lorenz energy cycle =

The Lorenz energy cycle describes the generation, conversion and dissipation of energy in the general atmospheric circulation. It is named after the meteorologist Edward N. Lorenz who worked on its mathematical formulation in the 1950s.

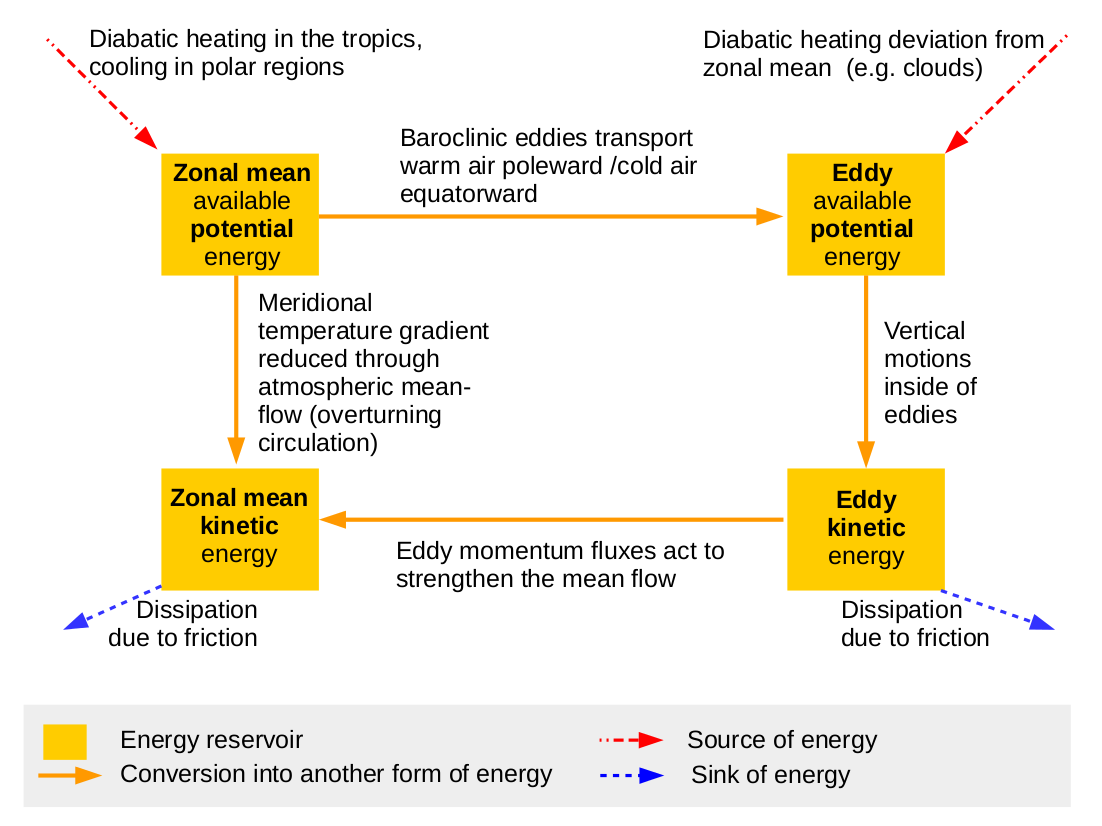
Schematic representation with examples

== Description ==
=== Introduction ===
Any atmospheric circulation system, whether it is a small-scale weather system or a large-scale zonal wind system, is maintained by the supply of kinetic energy. The development of such a system requires either a transformation of some other form of energy into kinetic energy, or the conversion of the kinetic energy of another system into that of the developing system. On a global scale, the atmospheric circulation must carry energy polewards, because there is a net gain of energy in the tropics through incoming solar radiation and net loss of energy in high latitudes through thermal emission. At low latitudes, where the Hadley cell takes shape, the poleward transport of energy is done by the mean meridional circulation. At mid-latitudes in contrast, the influence of longitudinally asymmetric features, referred to as eddies, is dominant over the mean flow. For a closer examination, it is useful to split all parameters (e.g. P) into their zonal-mean (denoted by an overline, e.g. P̅) and their departures from the zonal mean due to orography, land-sea contrasts, weather systems and any other eddy-like features (denoted by a prime, e.g. P').

=== Energy reservoirs ===
The available potential energy is the amount of potential energy in the atmosphere that can be converted into kinetic energy. In a statically stable atmosphere, the zonal-mean available potential energy P̅ is approximated as:

$$\overline{P}=\frac{1}{2}\int_A \frac{\rho_0}{N^2}\left(\frac{\partial\overline{\Phi}}{\partial z^{*}}\right)^2\,\mathrm{d}V$$

where $\int_A\mathrm{d}V$ is the integral over the Earth's entire atmosphere, ρ_{0} is the mean density of air, N is the buoyancy frequency, a measure of static stability, Φ is the geopotential and z* denotes a log-pressure coordinate.

Eddy available potential energy P' is approximated as:

$$P'=\frac{1}{2}\int_A \frac{\rho_0}{N^2}\overline{\left(\frac{\partial\Phi'}{\partial z^{*}}\right)^2}\,\mathrm{d}V$$

Zonal-mean kinetic energy K̅ is approximated as:

$$\overline{K}=\int_A\rho_0\frac{\overline{u}^2+\overline{v}^2}{2}\,\mathrm{d}V$$

where u and v are the zonal and meridional components of air velocity.

Eddy kinetic energy K' is approximated as:

$K'=\int_A\rho_0\frac{\overline{u'^2}+\overline{v'^2}}{2}\,\mathrm{d}V$

=== Sources, sinks and conversion of energy ===
The description of the Lorenz Energy Cycle is completed by a mathematical formalism for the generation of potential energy through diabatic heating, its conversion to kinetic energy through vertical motion of air and the dissipation of kinetic energy through friction. A conversion of zonal-mean energy to eddy energy and vice versa is possible where eddies interact with the mean flow and displace warm/cold air.
