= Landolt–Börnstein =

Collection of property data in materials science

Landolt–Börnstein is a collection of property data in materials science and the closely related fields of chemistry, physics and engineering published by Springer Nature.

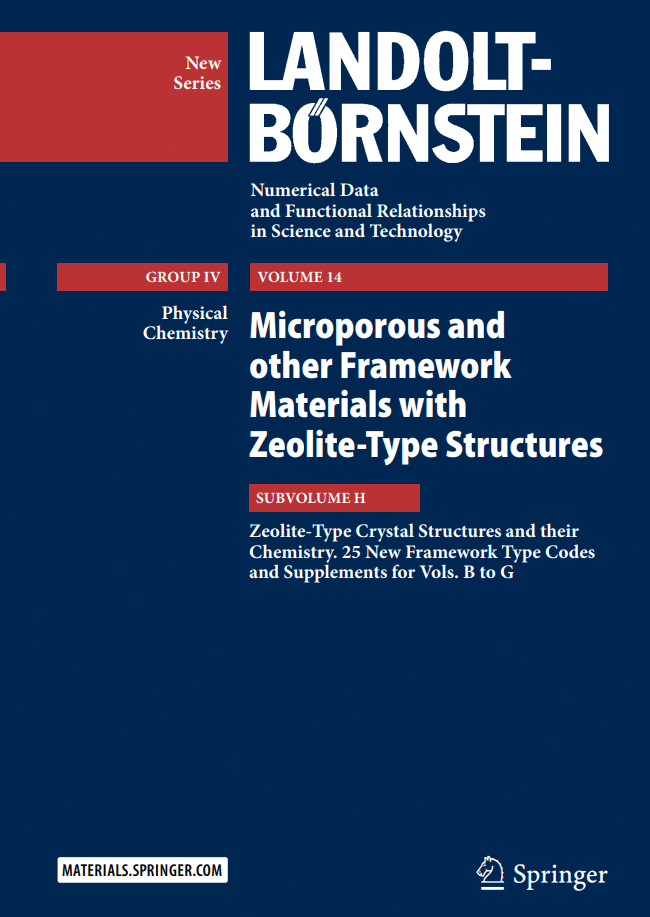

== History ==
On July 28, 1882, Dr. Hans Heinrich Landolt and Dr. Richard Börnstein, both professors at the "Landwirtschaftliche Hochschule" (Agricultural College) at Berlin, signed a contract with the publisher Ferdinand Springer on the publication of a collection of tables with physical-chemical data. The title of this book "Physikalisch-chemische Tabellen" (Physical-Chemical Tables) published in 1883 was soon forgotten. Owing to its success the data collection has been known for more than a hundred years by each scientist only as "The Landolt-Börnstein".

A total of 1,250 copies of the first edition were printed and sold. The second edition was published in 1894, followed by the third in 1905, the fourth in 1912, and finally the fifth edition in 1923. Supplementary volumes to the fifth edition were printed as late as 1936. New editions introduced major changes, including a large expansion of volumes, an increased number of authors, an updated structure, additional tables, and coverage of new areas in physics and chemistry.

The fifth edition was eventually published in 1923 and consisted of two volumes totaling 1,695 pages. Sixty-three authors contributed to this edition. The growth already evident in previous editions continued, making it clear that “another edition in approximately 10 years” was not a viable solution. As a result, a complete conceptual change to Landolt–Börnstein became necessary. In the meantime, supplementary volumes were to be issued at two-year intervals to fill gaps and incorporate the latest data. The first supplementary volume to the fifth edition was published in 1927, the second in 1931, and the third in 1935–36. The latter comprised three sub-volumes, totaling 3,039 pages, with contributions from 82 authors.

The 6th Edition (1950) was published in line with the revised general frame. The basic idea was to have four volumes instead of one, each of which was to cover different fields of the Landolt–Börnstein under different editors. Each volume was given a detailed table of contents. Two major restrictions were also imposed. The author of a contribution was asked to choose a "Bestwert" (optimum value) from the mass of statements of an experimental value in the publications of different authors, or derive a "wahrscheinlichster Wert” (most possible value). The other change of importance was that not only diagrams became as important as tables, but that text also became necessary to explain the presented data.

== The New Series ==
The New Series represents over 520 books published between 1961 and 2018 and includes more than 220,000 pages covering mechanical, optical, acoustical, thermal, spectroscopic, electrical and magnetic properties among others. The New Series offers critically evaluated data by over 1,000 expert authors and editors in materials science.

=== Particle Physics Reference Library ===
Three of the volumes in the New series. Group 1 Elementary particles, nuclei and atoms—volumes 21A, B1, B2, and C—have been updated (2020) and published open access in an independent hand book series, Particle Physics Reference Library, following a joint CERN–Springer initiative. These volumes are Theory and experiments, Detectors for particles and radiation, and Accelerators and colliders.

== Landolt-Börnstein Online ==
Landolt–Börnstein books have gone through various digitization initiatives, from CD-ROM to FTP and PDF formats. Landolt–Börnstein books content is now available on SpringerMaterials.

== Subjects covered by Landolt–Börnstein ==
- Condensed matter
- Nuclear physics
- Physical and chemical properties of molecules and radicals
- Physical chemistry
- Advanced materials
- Advanced technologies
- Geophysics
- Biophysics
