= Joseph Sadi-Lecointe =

French aviator

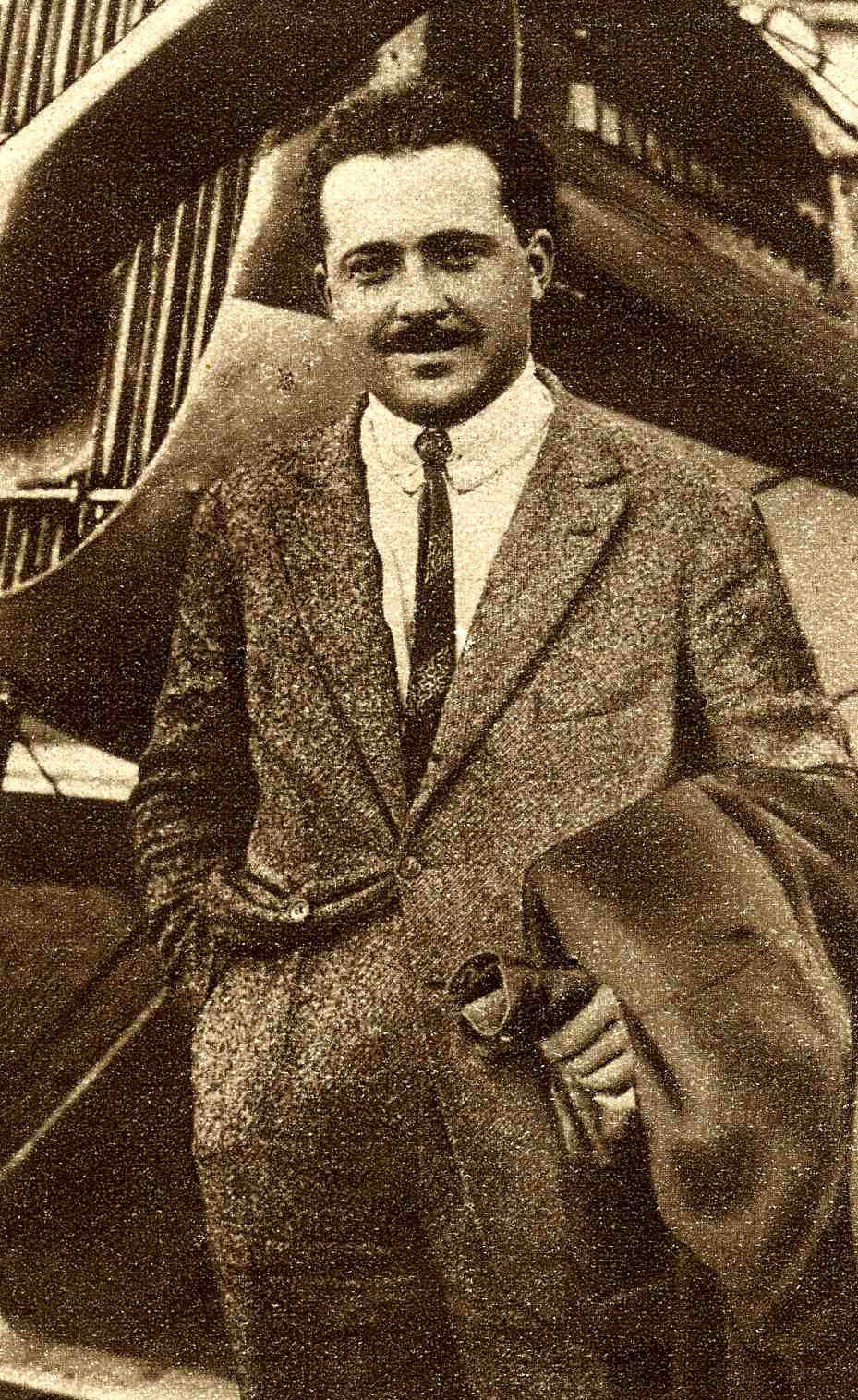
Sadi-Lecointe in 1919

Joseph Sadi-Lecointe (1891 – 1944) was a French aviator, best known for breaking a number of speed and altitude records in the 1920s.

== Biography ==
Sadi-Lecointe was born on 11 July 1891 at Saint-Germain-sur-Bresle. He learned to fly at the Zenith school at Issy-les-Moulineaux in 1910 and was awarded French Aero Club license No. 431 on 3 May 1911. Before formally qualifying, he had taken Georges Clemenceau for a short flight.

During the First World War he saw active service with Escadrille BL.10 and later, flying Nieuport scouts, with Escadrille MS.48. He became a flying instructor in 1916 and in September 1917 he became a test pilot with Bleriot-SPAD, working on the development of the SPAD XIII.

After the war he became a test pilot for Nieuport-Delage, flying their aircraft in a number of races and also using them to set seven speed and three altitude records. He was the winner of the 1920 Gordon Bennett race, securing permanent possession of the trophy for the Aero Club de France and was to fly the French entry for the 1921 Schneider Trophy at Venice, but had to withdraw after an accident during practice.

Between 1925 and 1927 he returned to military service as a volunteer, taking part in the Rif War in Morocco, afterwards returning to his job as chief test pilot with Nieuport Delage.

In 1936 he was appointed Inspector General of Aviation by the French Air Ministry. Mobilised at the outbreak of the Second World War, he became the Inspector of Flying Schools. His political sympathies did not allow him to serve under the Vichy government after the fall of France in 1940, and instead he was active in the French Resistance. On 21 March 1944 he was arrested by the Gestapo and held in Fresnes prison. Released after two months, he died on 15 July 1944 as a result of being tortured while in prison.

== Records ==
Speed

- 7 February 1920 — Speed over 1 km — 275.86 km/h (171.41 mph) — Nieuport-Delage NiD 29V
- 25 September 1920 — Speed over 100 km — 279.50 km/h (173.67 mph) — Nieuport-Delage NiD 29
- 28 September 1920 — Speed over 200 km — 274.60 km/h (170.63 mph) — Nieuport-Delage NiD 29
- 10 October 1920 — Speed over 1 km — 296.69 km/h (184.35 mph)275.86 km/h (171.41 mph) — Nieuport-Delage NiD 29V Bis
- 20 October 1920 — Speed over 1 km — 302.53 km/h (187.98 mph)275.86 km/h (171.41 mph) — Nieuport-Delage NiD 29V Bis
- 15 February 1923 — Speed over 1 km — 375 km/h (233 mph) — Nieuport-Delage NiD 42S
- 23 June 1924 — Speed over a distance of 500 km (310 mi) — 306.70 km/h (190.57 mph) — Nieuport-Delage NiD 42

Altitude

- 5 September 1923 — 10,741 m (35,240 ft) — Nieuport-Delage NiD 40R
- 30 October 1923 — 11,145 m (36,565 ft) — Nieuport-Delage NiD 40R
- 11 March 1924 — 8,980 m (29,460 ft) Nieuport-Delage NiD 40RH (altitude record for floatplanes)

== Honours ==
- Commandeur de la Légion d’Honneur
- Croix de Guerre 1914-1918
- Croix de guerre des théâtres d'opérations extérieures
- Croix de Guerre 1939-1945
- Médaille de la Résistance
- Grande Médaille d’Or de l’Aéro-Club de France

There is a street in the XIXieme arrondissement of Paris named in his honour.

== Notes ==
| Preceded by Arthur Berson and Reinhard Süring | Human altitude record 1923-1926 | Succeeded by John A. Macready |
