= Erik Palmén =

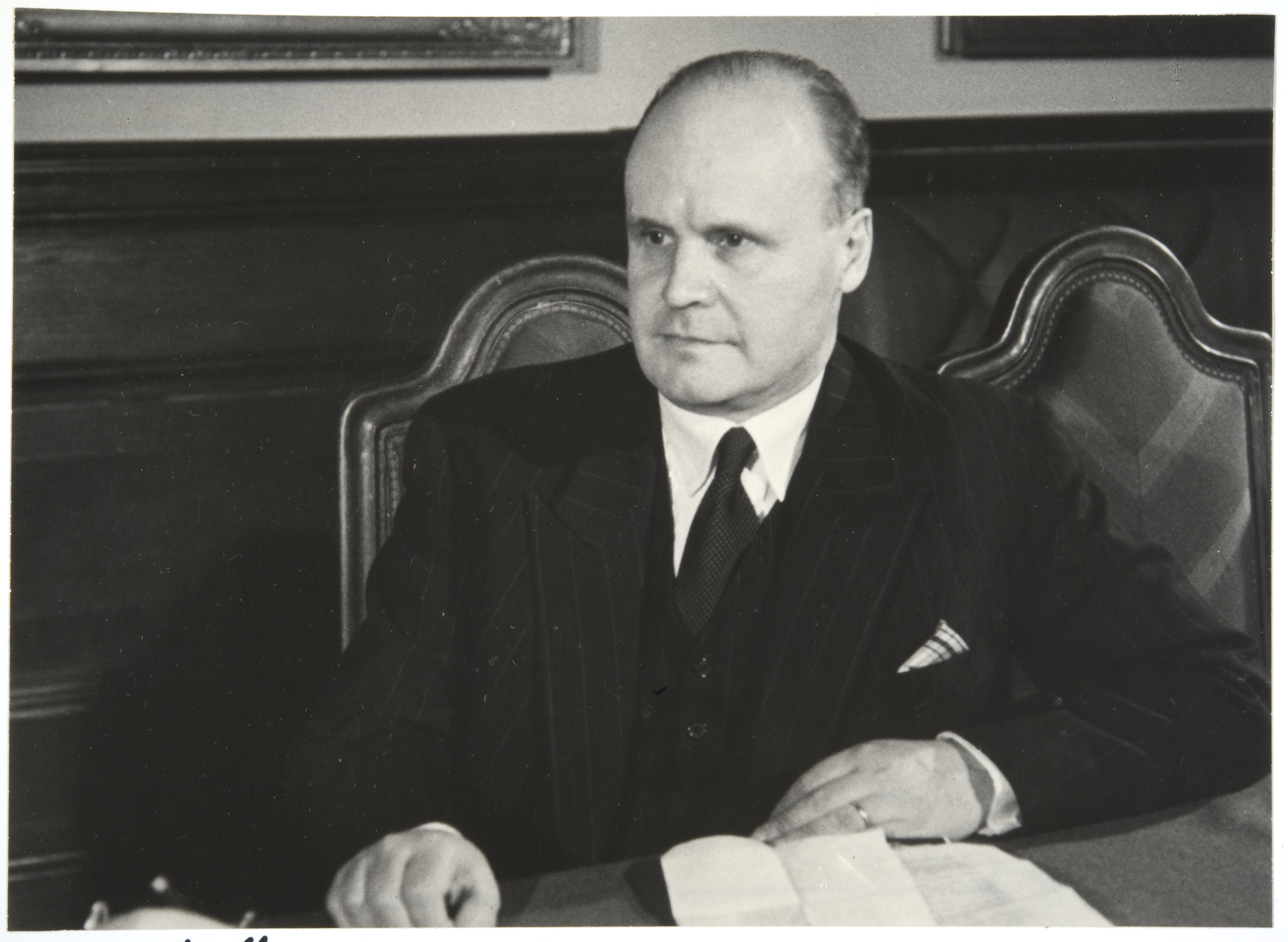
- Erik Palmén in the early 1940s.
- Born: 31 August 1898; Vaasa (Finland)
- Died: 19 March 1985 (aged 86)
- Education: Doctor of Philosophy
- Alma mater: University of Helsinki
- Occupation: Meteorologist; physicist
- Employer: University of Helsinki
- Awards: Carl-Gustaf Rossby Research Medal (1960); Buys Ballot Medal (1963); International Meteorological Organization Prize (1969); Symons Gold Medal (1957)

Erik Herbert Palmén (31 August 1898 – 19 March 1985) was a Finnish meteorologist, born in Vaasa. He worked at the University of Chicago in the Chicago school of meteorology (started by Carl-Gustaf Rossby) on cyclones and weather fronts with Vilhelm Bjerknes. He contributed to the explanation of the dynamics of the jet stream and the analysis of data collected by radiosondes; his preprocessed and quality checked datasets were widely used by other researchers. Palmen was a multisided researcher who published articles in meteorology, geophysics and oceanography. The 1969 book by Palmen and Chester W. Newton, "Atmospheric Circulation Systems: Their Structure and Interpretation", is still used as lecture material in the universities around the world.

Palmen was the director of Finnish Institute of Marine Research, a professor in Helsinki University and a member of the Finnish Academy of Arts and Letters. His nickname by students, friends and colleagues was Maestro and he was well known for his passion for cigars and interest of effects of weather on agriculture.

Palmen received the Buys Ballot Medal of Royal Netherlands Academy of Arts and Sciences in 1964. By then, when more computing power was available and the first steps of numerical weather prediction were taken, the value of the work done by the Chicago School 10–20 years earlier was really appreciated.

In 1969 he was awarded the prestigious International Meteorological Organization Prize from the World Meteorological Organization.
