= Reinhard Süring =

German meteorologist (1866–1950)

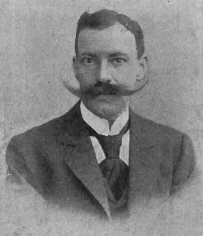
- Born: 15 May 1866; Hamburg
- Died: 29 December 1950 (aged 84); Potsdam
- Occupation: Meteorologist
- Known for: High-altitude balloon flights

Reinhard Joachim Süring (15 May 1866 – 29 December 1950) was a German meteorologist who was a native of Hamburg. He died in Potsdam, East Germany on 29 December 1950.

He studied natural sciences and mathematics at Göttingen, Marburg and Berlin, obtaining his doctorate in 1890 with a thesis titled Temperaturabnahme in Gebirgsgegenden in ihrer Abhängigkeit von der Bewölkung. Later that year, he became an assistant at the Prussian Meteorological Institute in Berlin, and during the following year, he went to work at the Meteorologisch-Magnetischen Observatoriums (Magnetic Meteorological Observatory) in Potsdam (1892).

In 1901 he was put in charge of the "storm department" at the Prussian Meteorological Institute, and in 1909 was appointed departmental head of the meteorological division of the Magnetic Meteorological Observatory. Following the retirement of geophysicist Adolf Schmidt (1860-1944), he became director of the observatory at Potsdam.

Between 1893 and 1921, Süring took part in numerous scientific high-altitude balloon experiments, being conducted with influential scientists that included, physiologists Hermann von Schrötter (1870-1928), Nathan Zuntz (1847-1920) and meteorologist Arthur Berson (1859-1942). On 31 July 1901, he and Berson reached an altitude of 10,800 meters in an open gondola balloon. Scientific data taken from this ascent was beneficial to research being performed by Richard Assmann (1845-1918) and Léon Teisserenc de Bort (1855-1913) in regards to their subsequent discovery of the stratosphere in 1902.

With Schrötter and Berson, he participated in tests involving the physiological effects of sub-atmospheric pressure, using a decompression chamber installed at the Jüdisches Krankenhaus (Jewish Hospital) in Berlin.

With Julius von Hann (1839-1921), he was the author of the Hann/Süring: Lehrbuch der Meteorologie, a textbook that was used for several generations by students of meteorology.

Preceded by Henry Coxwell and James Glaisher	Human altitude record 1901-1923; With: Arthur Berson	Succeeded by Joseph Sadi-Lecointe
