= Arthur Berson =

German meteorologist and pioneer of aerology

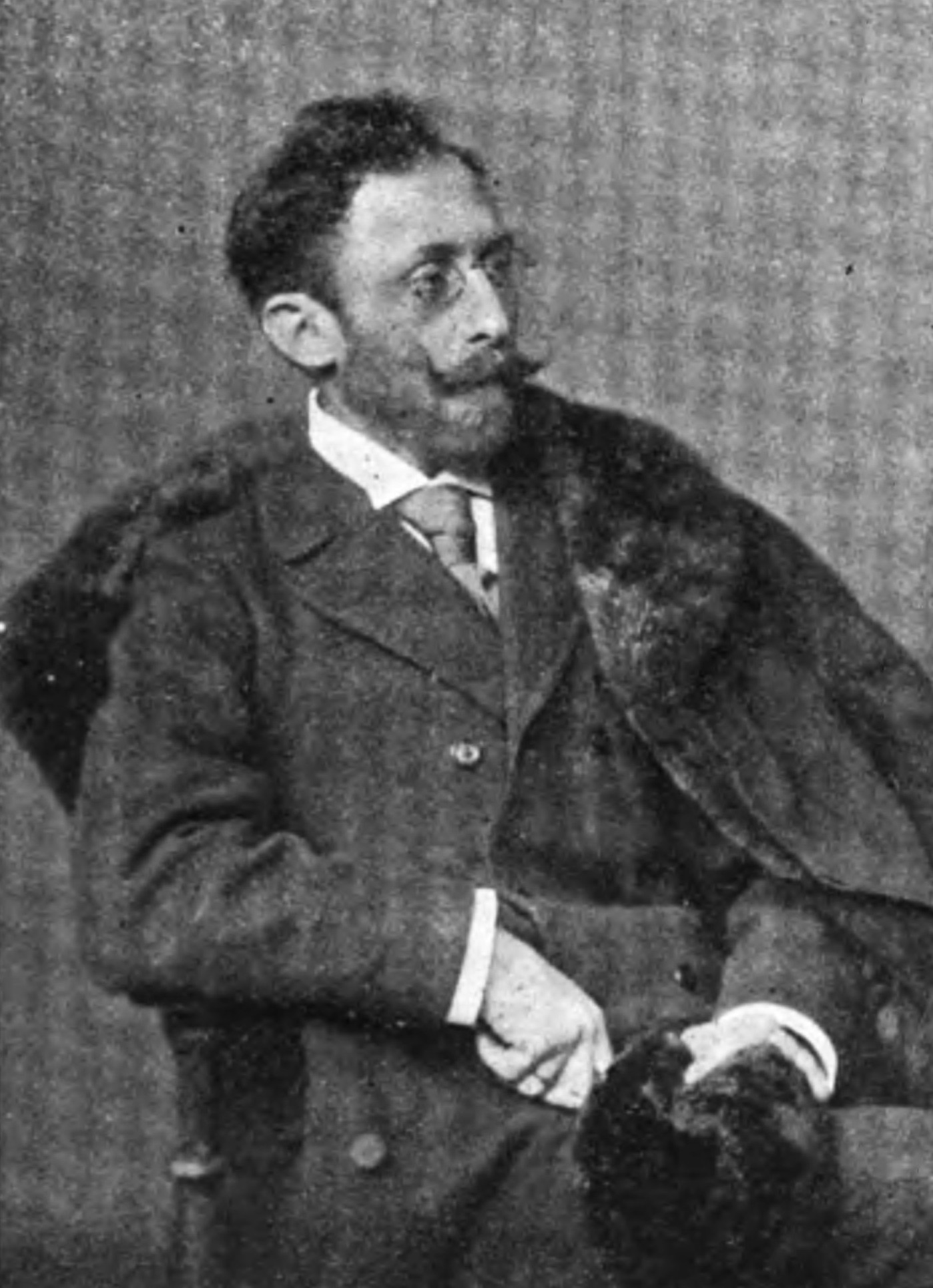
- Born: Arthur Josef Stanislaus Berson; 6 August 1859
- Died: 3 December 1942 (aged 83)
- Occupation: Meteorologist
- Known for: High-altitude scientific ballooning

Arthur Josef Stanislaus Berson (6 August 1859 – 3 December 1942) was a German meteorologist and pioneer of aerology who was a native of Neu Sandez, Galicia (now Nowy Sącz, Poland).

After visiting the gymnasium in Neu Sandez, Berson studied philology in Vienna. He then studied meteorology and geography in Berlin, where he had as instructors Ferdinand von Richthofen and Wilhelm von Bezold. In 1890 he was an assistant to meteorologist Richard Aßmann at the Meteorological Institute in Berlin. During this period of time he was also secretary of the Deutschen Verein zur Förderung der Luftschiffahrt, the first aeronautical organization in Germany. In 1900 he became Hauptobservator at the newly founded Aeronautics Observatory in Berlin-Tegel, and was later stationed at the Lindenberg Aeronautical Observatory in Beeskow. From 1896 to 1899 Berson was editor of the magazine Zeitschrift für Luftfahrt und Physik der Atmosphäre (Magazine for Aviation and Physics of the Atmosphere).

== Scientific research ==
Berson is largely known for his scientific hot-air balloon expeditions. On 4 December 1894, he ascended to a German record altitude of 9,155 meters aboard the hydrogen balloon Phoenix. On 10 January 1901, with artillery officer Alfred Hildebrandt (1870–1949), he travelled from Berlin to Markaryd, Sweden in a balloon, thus being the first to cross the Baltic Sea by air. On 10 January 1902, with balloonist Hermann Elias (1876–1955), he set the German long-distance ballooning record, as the two men journeyed from Berlin to Poltava in the central Ukraine (1,470 kilometers in 30 hours).

During the 1890s, he was involved in international "simultaneous ascents" with balloonists from other nations. These ascents were performed in order to study variances of climatic conditions above different locations in Europe, to work to bring about uniformity in methods of observation, and to create increased cooperation among nations in the new science of aerology.

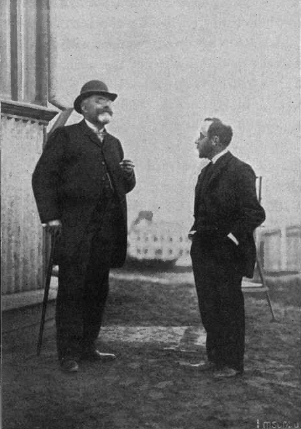
With Richard Aßmann; Berson at the right

On 31 July 1901, with meteorologist Reinhard Süring, he took his most celebrated ascent. Starting from Berlin-Tempelhof aboard the Preussen, Berson and Süring ultimately reached a height of 10,800 meters above sea level. At 6000 m. they required compressed oxygen, at 10,000 m. both scientists were rendered unconscious, and after regaining consciousness were able to land their balloon near Briesen, 7.5 hours after their flight began. Their record ascent had significant scientific importance. Climatic data taken from simultaneously released unmanned sounding balloons agreed with the information gathered from the Berson/Süring ascent. Now scientists such as Richard Aßmann no longer had any reason to distrust temperature readings taken from unmanned balloons, an important factor that led to the discovery of the stratosphere by Aßmann and Teisserenc de Bort in 1902.

Another important aspect of high-altitude flight involved physiological problems that balloonists could experience when exposed to conditions at great heights. Here, Berson assisted physiologists Hermann von Schrötter and Nathan Zuntz with pioneer experiments in the field of aviation medicine. He undertook high-altitude balloon ascents with the two physiologists, and conducted studies of decompression sickness with a pneumatic chamber located at the Jüdischen Krankenhaus (Jewish Hospital) in Berlin.

Other significant accomplishments by Berson include climatic studies with weather kites off of Svalbard, pioneer meteorological observations from German East Africa, and aerological research over the Amazon Basin.

== Publications ==
- Wissenschaftliche luftfahrten, ausgeführt vom Deutschen verein zur förderung der luftschiffahrt in Berlin 1899-1900 (with Richard Assmann; part of the series: Aeronautical collection. Folio group, v. 17) - Scientific air journeys, etc.
- Beitrage zur erforschung der atmosphare mittels des luftballons, 1900 (with Richard Assmann and others) - Contributions to the exploration of the atmosphere by means of balloons.
- Hauptfahrten Nr. 33 und 34, die gleichzeitigen Fahrten vom 6. bis 7. Juli 1894 die 18. Fahrt des "Phönix"; die 2. Fahrt des Registrirballons "Cirrus, 1900 - The 18 July 1894 run of the "Phonix"; the second ride, the registrar balloons "Cirrus".
- Ergebnisse der Arbeiten am Aëroautischen observatorium in den Jahren 1900 und 1901 (with Richard Assmann), 1902 - Results of the work at the aeronautic observatory in the years 1900/01.
- Bericht über die aerologische Expedition des Königlichen Aeronautischen Observatoriums nach Ostafrika im Jahre 1908, 1910 - Report on the aerological expedition of the Royal Aeronautical Observatory to East Africa in 1908.
- Die Vorbereitungen und die wissenschaftlichen Ergebnisse der Polarexpedition der "Italia", (with Umberto Nobile and others), 1929 - Preparations and scientific results of the polar expedition of the "Italia".
- Die arktisfahrt des luftschiffes "Graf Zeppelin" im juli 1931; wissenschaftliche ergebnisse, 1933 - The Arctic flight of the airship Graf Zeppelin in July 1931; scientific results.

Preceded by Henry Coxwell and James Glaisher	Human altitude record 1901-1923; With: Reinhard Süring	Succeeded by Joseph Sadi-Lecointe
