= Richard Assmann =

German meteorologist and physician

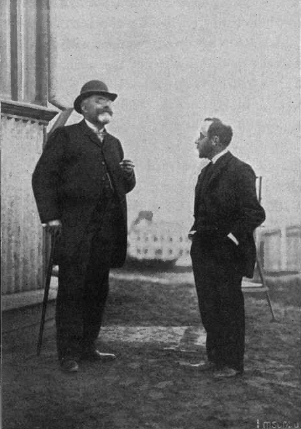
- Assmann (left) with meteorologist Arthur Berson
- Born: 13 April 1845; Magdeburg, Province of Saxony, Kingdom of Prussia
- Died: 28 May 1918 (aged 73); Gießen, German Empire
- Occupation: Meteorologist
- Known for: Co-discovery of the stratosphere

Richard Assmann (Anglicized spelling of the German name Richard Aßmann) (13 April 1845 in Magdeburg – 28 May 1918 in Gießen) was a German meteorologist and physician who was a native of Magdeburg. He made numerous contributions in high altitude research of the Earth's atmosphere. He was a pioneer of scientific aeronautics and considered a co-founder of aerology.

In 1868 he received his medical doctorate in Berlin, and from 1870 to 1879 was a general practitioner in Bad Freienwalde. In 1879 he returned to Magdeburg to practice medicine. In 1885 he earned a doctorate in secondary studies at the Faculty of Philosophy at the University of Halle, and subsequently became a scientific officer at the Royal Meteorological Institute at Berlin-Grünau. From 1905 to 1914 Assmann was director of the Prussian Royal Aeronautical Observatory at Lindenberg, and afterwards was an honorary professor at the University of Giessen.

From 1887 to 1892, with airship designer Rudolf Hans Bartsch von Sigsfeld (1861–1902), he developed a psychrometer for accurate measurement of atmospheric humidity and temperature. This was the first instrument that was able to provide reliable temperature readings with high altitude balloons, as it was capable of shielding its thermometric elements from solar radiation. The technical implementation and production of this device took place in the factory of Rudolf Fuess (1838–1917).

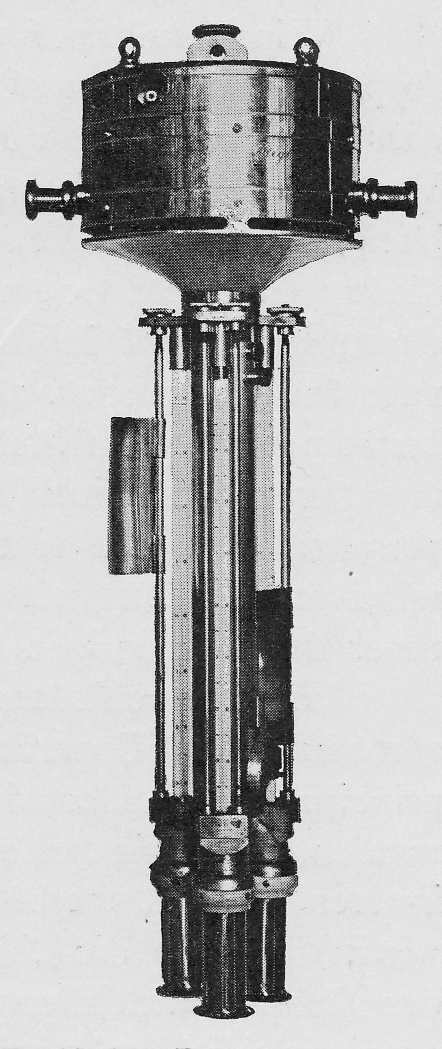
Threefold aspiration-psychrometer (Assmann type, prior to 1900)

From 1888 to 1899, he was a member of the Verein zur Förderung der Luftschifffahrt, from which he organized scientific balloon ascents in order to study the atmosphere. From these studies, valuable insights in regards to atmospheric stratification of the troposphere were made. He is also credited for popularizing the field of meteorology, and played a significant role in several scientific newspapers and magazines during his career. From 1884 until his death, Assmann published the popular monthly magazine Das Wetter (The Weather).

With Léon Teisserenc de Bort (1855–1913), he is credited as co-discoverer of the stratosphere, as both men announced their discovery during the same time period in 1902.

In 1903, with meteorologist Arthur Berson (1859–1942), he was awarded the Buys Ballot Medal by the Royal Netherlands Academy of Sciences.

== Selected writings ==
- Der Einfluß der Gebirge auf das Klima von Mitteldeutschland, 1886 - The influence of mountains on the climate of central Germany.
- Das Aspirations-Psychrometer. Ein Apparat zur Bestimmung der wahren Temperatur und Feuchtigkeit der Luft, (editor), 1892 - The aspiration psychrometer. An apparatus for determining the true temperature and humidity of the air.
- Wissenschaftliche Luftfahrten, ausgeführt vom Deutschen Verein zur Förderung der Luftfahrt in Berlin, (three volumes, co-edited with Arthur Berson), 1899–1900 - Scientific air trips, run by the German Association for the Advancement of Aviation in Berlin.
- Beiträge zur Erforschung der Atmosphäre mittels des Luftballons, 1900 - Contributions to the study of the atmosphere by means of balloons.
- Die modernen Methoden zur Erforschung der Atmosphäre mittels des Luftballons und Drachen, 1901 - The modern methods to study the atmosphere by means of balloons and kites.
- Über die Existenz eines wärmeren Luftstromes in der Höhe von 10 bis 15 km, in: Sitzungsberichte der Königlich-Preußischen Akademie der Wissenschaften zu Berlin (Sitzung der physikalisch-mathematischen Klasse vom 1. Mai 1902), Bd. 24, 1902, S. 1-10. - On the existence of a warm air current at heights from 10 to 15 km.
