= Victor Negus =

British laryngologist and comparative anatomist (1887-1974)

Sir Victor Negus MS FRCS
- Born: Victor Ewings Negus; 6 February 1887; Tooting, London
- Died: 15 July 1974 (aged 87); Hindhead, Surrey
- Education: King's College London
- Occupation: Surgeon
- Years active: 1924–1952
- Medical career
- Field: Laryngology
- Awards: Lister Medal (1954)

Sir Victor Ewings Negus, MS, FRCS (6 February 1887 – 15 July 1974) was a British surgeon who specialised in laryngology and also made fundamental contributions to comparative anatomy with his work on the structure and evolution of the larynx. He was born and educated in London, studying at King's College School, then King's College London, followed by King's College Hospital. The final years of his medical training were interrupted by the First World War, during which he served with the Royal Army Medical Corps. After the war, he qualified as a surgeon and studied with laryngologists in France and the USA before resuming his career at King's College Hospital where he became a junior surgeon in 1924.

In the 1920s, Negus worked on aspects of both throat surgery and the anatomy of the larynx, the latter work contributing to his degree of Master of Surgery (1924). His surgical innovations included designs for laryngoscopes, bronchoscopes, oesophagoscopes, an operating table, and tracheotomy equipment. His major publications were The Mechanism of the Larynx (1929) and his work on the clinical text Diseases of the Nose and Throat, starting with the fourth edition of 1937. Negus was also awarded several lectureships and published many medical papers and other works on comparative anatomy and laryngology. He became a senior surgeon at King's College Hospital in 1940 and a consulting surgeon in 1946.

Negus was one of the founders of the British Association of Otorhinolaryngologists, helping to establish his speciality as a discipline within the newly formed National Health Service. He was a member of numerous international and national otolaryngology organisations, and presided over the Fourth International Congress of Otolaryngology in London in 1949. In this period of his career following the Second World War he also worked on the anatomy of the paranasal sinuses, and played a key role in rebuilding and establishing collections of animal dissections used by comparative anatomists.

Negus, who married in 1929 and had two sons, retired in 1952, though he continued to publish on comparative anatomy and the history of medicine. His honours before and after retirement included the Fellowship of King's College, London (1945), an honorary degree (1950), the Lister Medal (1954), a knighthood (1956), honorary fellowships of the Royal College of Surgeons of Edinburgh (1949) and the Royal College of Surgeons in Ireland (1958), and the Honorary Gold Medal of the Royal College of Surgeons of England (1969). He died in Hindhead, Surrey, aged 87 in 1974.

== Early life and education ==
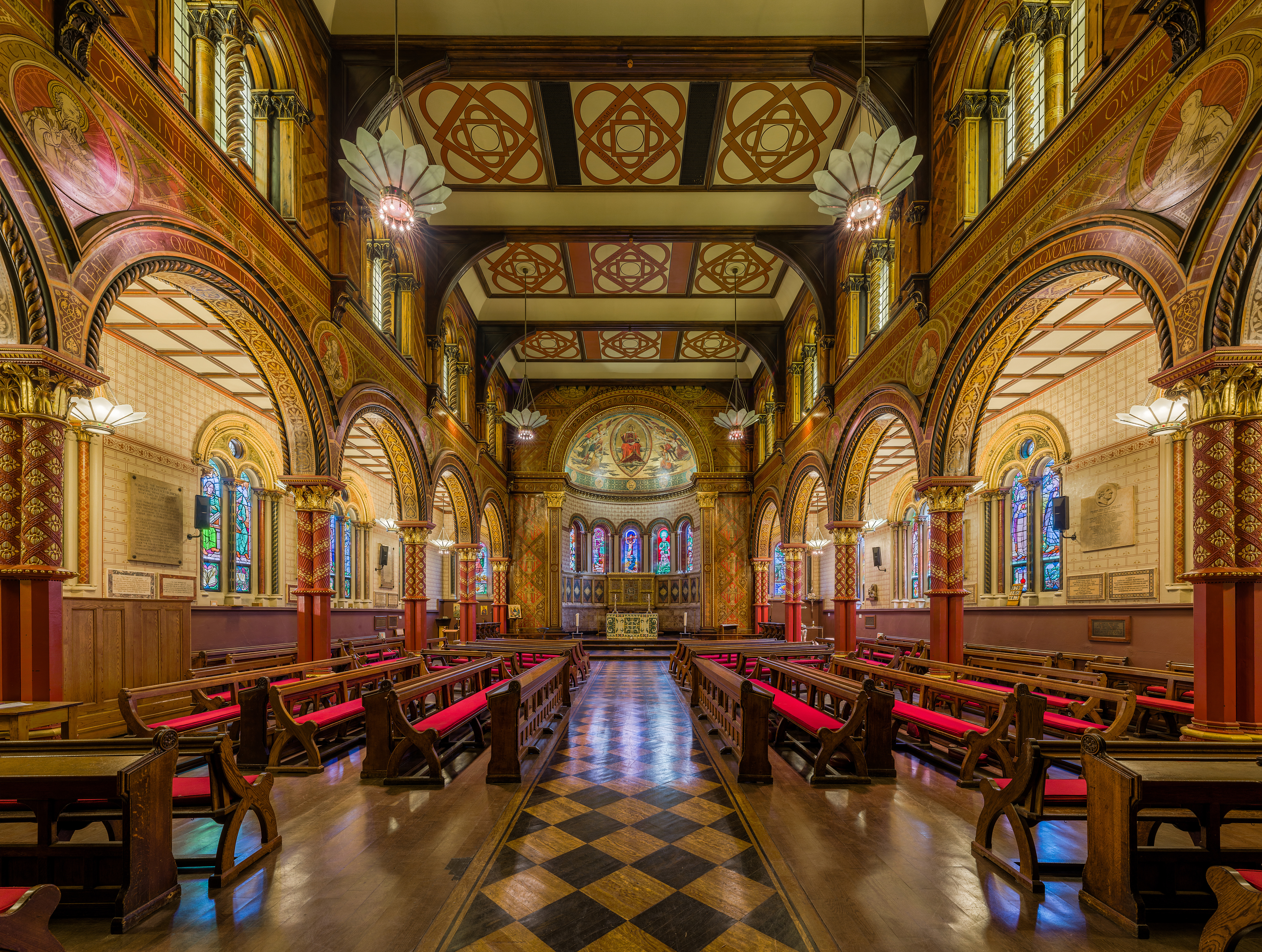
The chapel of King's College, where Negus studied at university

Victor Ewings Negus was born on 6 February 1887 in Tooting, London, the youngest of three sons of William and Emily Negus (née Ewings). His father was a solicitor, Justice of the Peace, and Deputy Lieutenant for the County of Surrey. Victor's pre-university education took place at King's College School. (Note: King's College School, instituted in 1829 and opened in 1831, had originally been located in the premises of King's College London on the Strand in Central London, but moved to Wimbledon in South-West London in 1897.) In 1906, he was awarded a Sambrooke scholarship to King's College London, on the Strand, where his studies for the next three years included premedical and preclinical subjects.

After passing the required examinations, Negus proceeded in 1909 to the next stage of his basic medical education at the nearby King's College Hospital, at that time located on Portugal Street between the Strand and Lincoln's Inn Fields. (Note: King's College Hospital had been founded in Portugal Street in 1839 and opened in 1840. That site, where Negus studied, closed in 1913 after King's College Hospital moved to Denmark Hill, south of the river, where the building of new facilities had started in 1909.) Three more years of study led to the attainment in 1912 of the MRCS and LRCP (Membership of the Royal College of Surgeons and Licentiate of the Royal College of Physicians, known as the 'conjoint diploma'), marking his formal qualification to practice medicine. In the final year of these studies, Negus was an usher at the funeral service for Lord Lister at Westminster Abbey. Another connection with Lister's generation came when Negus worked as surgical dresser and house surgeon under Sir William Watson Cheyne, who had himself been house surgeon to Lister. (Note: At the time of his death, Lister was renowned for the impact his work on antiseptic surgery had had on the medical profession. His funeral service on 16 February 1912 was a grand affair, attended by representatives from all over Europe. A contemporary description was given in the British Medical Journal. Negus, in the opening remarks for his 1955 Lister Oration some 43 years later, described it as a "moving ceremony". The impact of Lister on Negus and his generation can be seen in additional remarks from that lecture, where Negus states that he was "brought up in the Listerian tradition" and that those "who worked for Cheyne had the greatest respect and veneration for their chief, and they were imbued with a similar veneration for Lister himself [...]".) The postgraduate stages of Negus's training involved specialisation in diseases of the ear, nose and throat, a direction influenced and guided by the otorhinolaryngologist St Clair Thomson (1857–1943). In the years following his qualification in 1912, Negus worked at King's College Hospital, and had started further clinical training at the Hospital for Diseases of the Throat in Golden Square, Soho, but this was interrupted by the outbreak of the First World War.

Negus served in the Royal Army Medical Corps (RAMC) with the British Expeditionary Force for the first 18 months of the war. He initially deployed with the 1st General Hospital, then saw action in the trenches on the front line with a machine-gun battalion at the First Battle of Ypres. The effects of explosives during this period left him with tinnitus. This was followed by a period serving on hospital barges. In 1916, Negus, still with the RAMC, was posted to the 3rd (Lahore) Division (part of the British Indian Army) and took part in the Mesopotamia Campaign. As one of those who had deployed to the Western Front in the opening months of the war, he was later awarded the Mons Star. His service in the RAMC ended in 1919. (Note: Negus's memoirs from this period were among those deposited in archives at the Royal College of Surgeons of England.)

== Surgical career and family ==
The structure of the larynx, in which Negus specialised

Following his discharge from the army, Negus, again with the advice and guidance of St Clair Thomson, resumed his studies and preparations for a career in throat surgery. By 1921 he had graduated MB BS (London) [Bachelor of Medicine, Bachelor of Surgery] and by 1922 he had taken the surgical exams for the FRCS (Fellow of the Royal College of Surgeons) qualification. To gain further experience, he spent periods of time abroad studying with renowned laryngologists: firstly with Emil Moure and Georges Portmann in Bordeaux, France; and secondly with Chevalier Jackson in Philadelphia, USA. On his return to London, he became clinical assistant to St Clair Thomson at King's College Hospital. (Note: Clinical Assistant was one of the formal grades or ranks that existed in UK hospital medicine at the time. During his career, Negus progressed through these grades, which included Junior Surgeon, Surgeon, and Senior Surgeon. Examples can be seen in the archival records description for patient case notes at King's College Hospital in that period.)

At this point, still early in his surgical career, Negus took a different approach to that which was common at the time. Rather than be apprenticed to a leading surgeon in his ENT (ear, nose and throat) speciality, he undertook basic research on the structure of the larynx that led to a higher degree in 1924 and the publication of books and papers on the topic in later years. (Note: For details of Negus's work on comparative anatomy, see the comparative anatomy section of this article.) While engaged in this research, Negus continued his work at King's College Hospital, being appointed junior surgeon in 1924. It was during this period, following his return from the USA, that Negus both promoted the methods and tools he had seen used in Philadelphia by Jackson, and worked to improve the designs of the endoscopes and other equipment used in ENT surgery. These instruments, developed in collaboration with the Genito-Urinary Company of London, included laryngoscopes, bronchoscopes (such as the Negus bronchoscope) and oesophagoscopes. Other surgical innovations developed by Negus included an operating table (known as the King's College table), and a speaking valve for use in tracheotomy tubes. He also helped develop strategies for treatments of throat cancer to aid the choice between surgery and radiotherapy.

In 1929, Negus married Winifred Adelaide Gladys Rennie (1901–1980, known as Eve) (Note: This marriage, with the engagement announced in 1928 in The Times, took place around four years after the death of Negus's father, who had died in the period 1924/5; Negus's mother died in 1939. The engagement announcement stated that Gladys (Eve) was daughter to the late Robert Rennie, an engineer.) with whom he had two sons, David (1930–2010) and Richard (1932–2008). (Note: Negus's eldest son David, like his father, became a consultant surgeon and Fellow of the Royal College of Surgeons. David's younger brother Richard did not enter the medical profession, marrying in 1960 and settling in the USA.) Negus's surgical and medical teaching career continued to progress, and he was appointed surgeon in 1931. It was in 1937 that his major work in clinical medicine, the fourth edition of Diseases of the Nose and Throat, was published. This work, "still used for reference", was described as "for many years the standard textbook in English on this subject", and as Negus's "major literary contribution to clinical medicine". The 1937 edition continued work on earlier editions by St Clair Thomson, who worked jointly with Negus on the new edition. A fifth edition worked on by both men was published in 1948 following Thomson's death, and the sixth edition by Negus alone appeared in 1955.

In 1939, the Negus family moved to Haslemere, Surrey. During the Second World War, Negus again served in a medical capacity, this time with the Emergency Medical Service (EMS) at Horton Hospital, Epsom, from 1939 to 1946. In 1940, on the retirement of his colleague Charles Hope, he had been appointed senior surgeon at King's College Hospital, and in 1946 he reached the peak of his profession as a consulting surgeon. During this post-war period one of Negus's patients was the former (and future) prime minister Winston Churchill, who in 1950 was diagnosed by Negus with high-frequency sensorineural hearing loss. (Note: Churchill and other celebrity patients of Negus were named in an interview given in 2011 by his daughter-in-law Daphne Negus, as part of recollections of her husband Richard: "His family were doctors. Sir Victor Negus, his father, was a Harley Street ENT Specialist whose patients included Elizabeth Taylor, Claudette Colbert, and Sir Winston Churchill.") Negus retired from clinical and teaching work in 1952 at the age of 65.

== Comparative anatomy ==
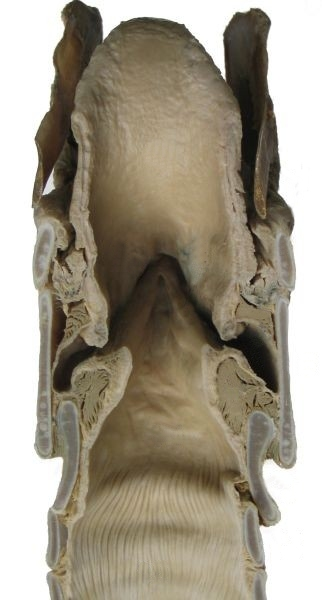
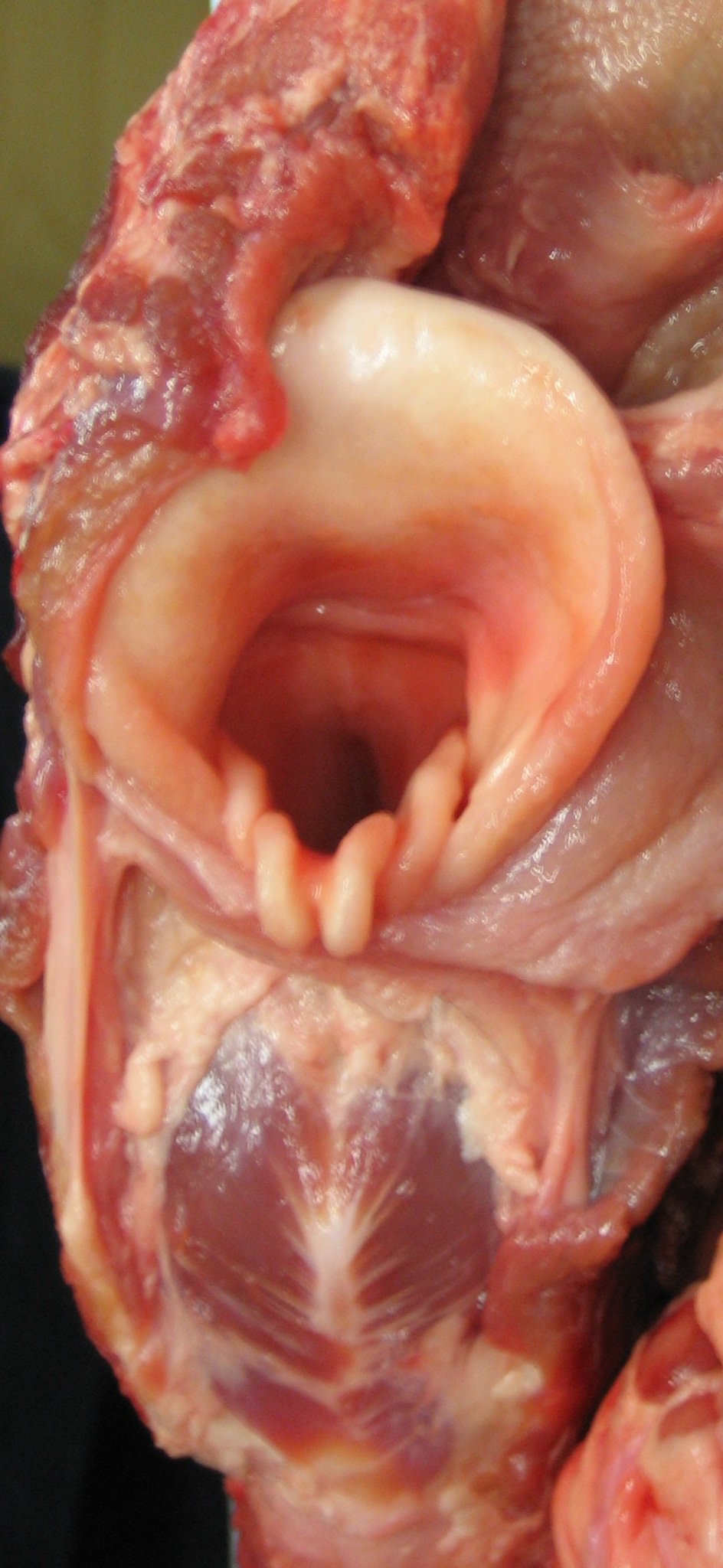
Examples of animal larynges, like those dissected by Negus. At left is the larynx of a horse. At right is the larynx of a pig.

In parallel with his career as a throat surgeon at a teaching hospital, Negus become a leading expert on the comparative anatomy of first the larynx and then the nose and the paranasal sinuses. This strand of his professional life started with the research he carried out in his thirties in the 1920s that eventually led to his degree of Master of Surgery (MS), awarded by the University of London. This work started as early as 1921 in the laboratories of the Royal College of Surgeons of England, whose museum housed the collections of animal specimens gathered by the anatomist John Hunter. Working on these specimens, and adding to them with others supplied by the Zoological Society of London, Negus carried out meticulous dissections that enabled him to trace the stages of evolution and development of the larynx across a wide variety of animals. Part of this research was submitted as his thesis, and the excellence of the work was recognised by the award of a Gold Medal with his MS degree in 1924. In addition to this, Negus gave the Arris and Gale Lecture on 28 April 1924 at the Royal College of Surgeons, with his talk titled "On the Mechanism of the Larynx".

Further recognition of his work came when Negus was made Hunterian Professor at the Royal College of Surgeons in 1925, followed three years later in 1928 by the awarding of the triennial John Hunter Medal (1925–7) from the Royal College of Surgeons, which came with a prize of £50. The following year Negus published his observations and conclusions in The Mechanism of the Larynx (1929), a "classic piece of research" still referred to forty-five years later in 1974 as "the standard reference book" on this topic. Negus's work had shown that the main function of the larynx is as a valve that only allows air into the lower respiratory tract. In humans, the voice is only a byproduct of this more vital function. Another lecture resulting from this work was given under the auspices of the University of London's Semon Lectureship, named after the German-born British laryngologist Felix Semon (1849–1921). This talk was delivered on 6 November 1930 at the Royal Society of Medicine under the title "Observations on Semon's Law".

These earlier works were followed after the Second World War by the publication of Comparative Anatomy and Physiology of the Larynx (1949). This work was a condensed and updated version of Negus's original 1929 work on the larynx. It was in this post-war period that Negus increasingly studied the function of the nose, both as the organ for the sense of smell (olfaction) and the role of the nose in respiration. This was prompted by wartime damage in 1941 to the Royal College of Surgeons' Hunterian Museum, which included the loss of parts of the Onodi Collection. This collection had contained specimens of the accessory sinuses (paranasal sinuses) prepared by the Hungarian laryngologist Adolf Onodi (1857–1919) and demonstrated by him in 1900. Negus undertook to replace the destroyed and damaged specimens and to extend the collection with animal specimens. This work was covered in Negus's Hunterian Lecture, delivered on 20 May 1954 at the Royal College of Surgeons under the title "Introduction to the Comparative Anatomy of the Nose and Paranasal Sinuses". This was followed four years later by the publication of Comparative Anatomy and Physiology of the Nose and Paranasal Sinuses (1958). Much of this later work was carried out after retirement in 1952, both at the laboratories of the Royal College of Surgeons and at the Ferens Institute of Otolaryngology at the Middlesex Hospital. Negus's research over many years on these topics and their relation to nose and throat surgery led to the awarding of the 1954 Lister Medal. This was presented the following year when Negus delivered the Lister Oration on 5 April 1955 at the Royal College of Surgeons. The oration was titled "The Comparative Anatomy and Physiology of the Respiratory Tract in Relation to Clinical Problems". Ten years later, towards the end of his life, Negus published The Biology of Respiration (1965).

Negus's legacy in this field was assessed in 1986 by the British surgeon and comparative anatomist Sir Donald Frederick Norris Harrison, himself an expert on the mammalian larynx. Writing further on the subject in 1995, Harrison states that Negus's "pioneer research into the mechanism of the animal larynx [...] established him as a unique comparative anatomist." Harrison quotes from the Scottish anatomist Sir Arthur Keith's preface to The Mechanism of the Larynx. In this preface, Negus's 1929 work is described as showing "the same patient power of assembling observation after observation as Darwin had and some of the hot pursuit of function as urged by Hunter". (Note: The quote from Keith refers to the 19th-century naturalist Charles Darwin, famed for his theory of evolution, and the 18th-century surgeon and anatomist John Hunter, with whose specimens Negus had been working. This comparison was highlighted in contemporary reviews such as the one that appeared in Nature.)

== Societies and administration ==
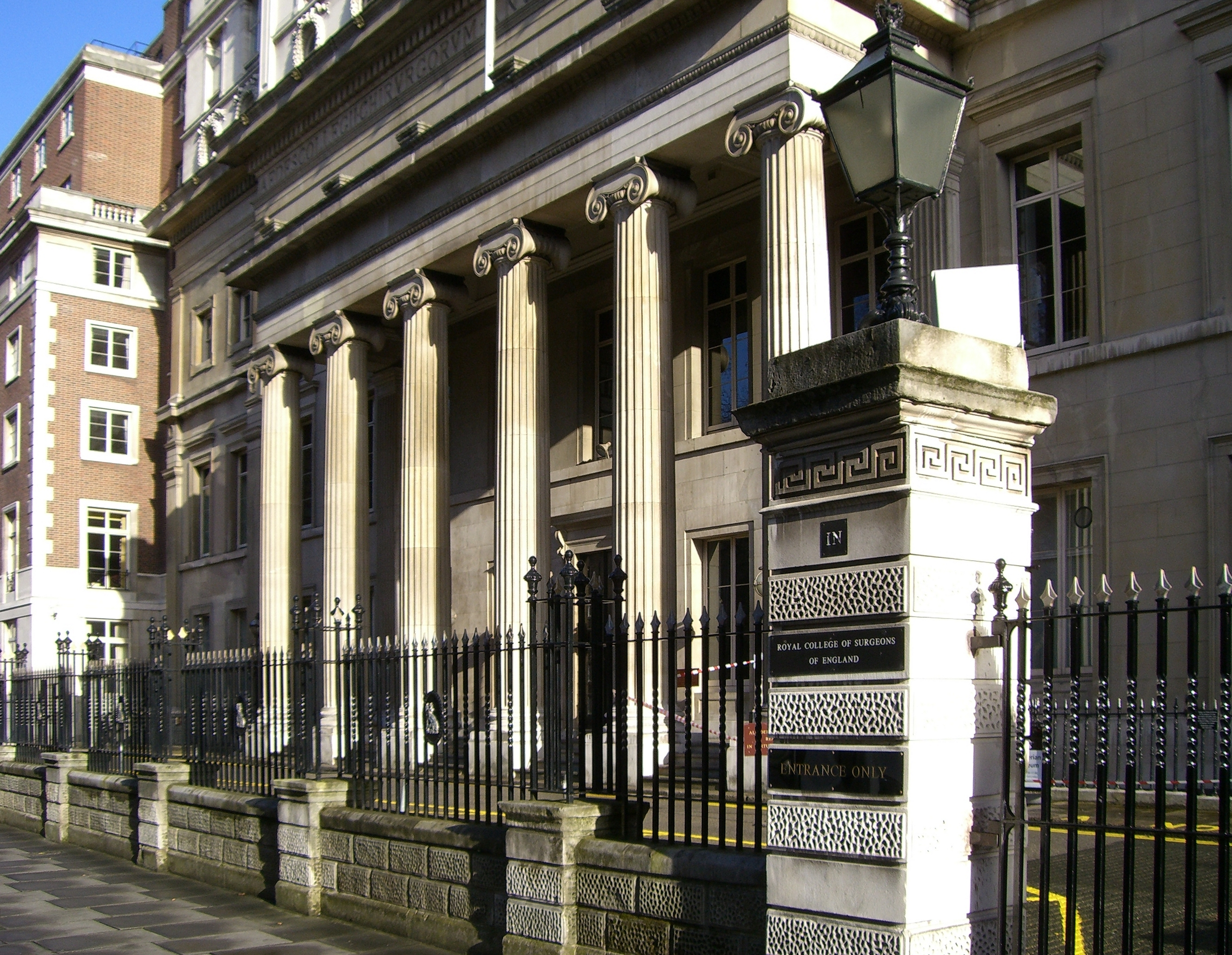
The Royal College of Surgeons of England, at Lincoln's Inn Fields, London

As one of the leading practitioners in his speciality, Negus served in many roles in its organisation and administration at both a national and international level. In particular, he worked closely with the Royal College of Surgeons of England, the body responsible for the accreditation and representation of surgeons practising in England and Wales, and also the organisation that supported him in his researches in comparative anatomy. The Royal College of Surgeons is located in London, and from 1939 to 1941 he was President of its Listerian Society.

In 1942, Negus was President of the Section of Laryngology at the Royal Society of Medicine. When Negus had been training as a surgeon, laryngology, rhinology and otology had been part of general surgery, but this was changing with the advent of ENT (ear, nose and throat) medicine as a combined and specialised discipline. Negus and colleagues attempted to set up the necessary structure within the Royal Society of Medicine to represent their profession as an emerging speciality, but the regulations in place did not allow the type of organisation they had planned. This led them, in 1943, to found the British Association of Otorhinolaryngologists, which was able to represent ENT surgeons through the Royal College of Surgeons. (Note: More details of the founding of the British Association of Otorhinolaryngologists (BAO) were published in an announcement made in October 1943 in The Journal of Laryngology & Otology by one of the co-founders Frank Cunliffe Ormerod. This organisation subsequently became the British Association of Otorhinolaryngologists – Head and Neck Surgeons (BAO-HNS), which since 2008 has been ENT•UK, which formed as a merger between BAO-HNS and the British Academic Conference in Otolaryngology (BACO). For more on the early history of the organisation founded by Negus and colleagues, see The Role of the British Association of Otolaryngologists (BAOL) in the Development of Otolaryngology in Great Britain from 1943–1968 (Neil Francis Weir, University of London, 2008).) Following the war, Negus was co-opted to the Council of the Royal College of Surgeons in 1947, and was the first to represent otolaryngology at that level. He was also a member of the college's Court of Examiners, and worked to set up the first examination in otorhinolaryngology that could be taken for the FRCS diploma. This reorganisation was taking place against a background of immense change in how medicine was practised in the UK, due to the advent of the National Health Service (NHS). Negus's colleague, Geoffrey Bateman, writing in 1974, credits him with having the foresight to represent the interests of otolaryngology and see it established as a major speciality in its own right within the NHS.

Negus became President of the British Association of Otorhinolaryngologists in 1951, and this was one of a number of presidencies he held, including that of the Thoracic Society (1949–50) and the Fourth International Congress of Otolaryngology. The latter was a large event that took place in London over a week in July 1949. It was held in the Great Hall of King's College, London, and was attended by over 700 otolaryngology specialists from 39 countries. The patron was King George VI and the congress was opened by the Duchess of Kent. Negus was President and host for the 1954 annual meeting of the Collegium Oto-rhino-laryngologicum Amicitiae Sacrum (CORLAS), held in London from 29 August to 1 September, and was the treasurer of CORLAS from 1936 to 1950. Negus was also associated with, and gave talks to, numerous medical societies in the UK and abroad, with his connections ranging from honorary fellowships to corresponding and honorary memberships. These foreign societies included the American Broncho-Esophagological Association, and the countries included Sweden, Denmark, Canada, the USA, Austria, France, Italy, Hungary, and Turkey. (Note: The entry for Negus in Who Was Who includes a listing of these societies.) Bateman opined in his obituary of Negus that it seemed unlikely that any other British ENT surgeon "has been honoured by so many societies".

Following his retirement, Negus continued his involvement with the Royal College of Surgeons, becoming a trustee (and later chairman of the trustees) of the Hunterian Collection, the same collection that included the specimens that had underpinned his research some thirty years earlier. He also published books on the history of the college and its collections: The History of the Trustees of the Hunterian Collection (1965); and The Artistic Possessions at the Royal College of Surgeons of England (1968).

== Honours, awards and legacy ==
In his later years, Negus received many awards and honours. In 1945, he was made a Fellow of King's College, London. (Note: The Fellowship and Honorary Fellowship of King's College, London (designated FKC) is not a research appointment, but is rather an award, established in 1847, and conferred "in recognition of [...] exceptional achievement and/or service rendered to the College".) On 25 July 1949, he received the honorary fellowship of the Royal College of Surgeons of Edinburgh. Further tributes followed as an honorary Doctor of Science (D.Sc.) was conferred on him on 17 May 1950 by the University of Manchester. Back in London, the Royal Society of Medicine made him an honorary fellow in 1954. Two years later, Negus was made a knight bachelor with the investiture taking place at Buckingham Palace on 7 February 1956. On 28 August 1958, it was the turn of the Royal College of Surgeons in Ireland to bestow their honorary fellowship on him. In addition to these awards, Negus continued to give lectures, including an Erasmus Wilson demonstration awarded by the Royal College of Surgeons of England in 1953, and the Johns Hopkins Lecture on 30 April 1957. Negus also received the 1963 Gould Award from the William and Harriet Gould Foundation of Chicago, USA, "for his monumental contributions to the science of laryngology".

On 13 February 1969, Negus and two others (Sir Geoffrey Keynes and Sir Stanford Cade) were presented with the Honorary Gold Medal of the Royal College of Surgeons of England. This award, which had only been made thirty times since 1802 prior to the 1969 ceremony, is presented for "liberal acts or distinguished labours, researches and discoveries, eminently conducive to the improvement of natural knowledge and of the healing art." The medal was presented by Sir Hedley Atkins, the President of the Royal College of Surgeons, who paid tribute to Negus: "Sir Victor Negus is perhaps the most distinguished of all those who have served the Council as a co-opted member. He has always been known to us as a great research worker and scientist, whose labours earned him the Lister Medal, a man of exceptional integrity and industry and a persistent advocate of the value of tradition in its best sense." Atkins also paid tribute to Negus's wife, Lady Negus, who had crafted and presented to the college a tapestry of its coat-of-arms. Responding, Negus thanked the members of the Council for the award and for the privilege of having used college facilities since 1921, concluding: "I take this honour as a mark of approval for any work I have done, and I feel I can now sit back and leave it to others to carry on. I would also like to thank you for inviting my wife to be here to-day; she has taken a great part in all I have done." (Note: Both the Oxford Dictionary of National Biography entry for Negus, by consultant ENT surgeon Neil Weir, and Bateman's obituary in the Annals of the Royal College of Surgeons of England, give details of the role played by Negus's wife Eve, describing her as "an artist of considerable merit" who illustrated several of his books.)

Negus died in Hindhead, Surrey, on 15 July 1974, at the age of 87, survived by his wife and children. (Note: Negus's widow, Lady Negus, died six years later on 15 October 1980.) Negus's status in the history of laryngology in the UK was remarked on in his obituary in The Times, which stated that he "made a worthy fourth to Morell Mackenzie, Felix Semon, and St Clair Thomson". Obituaries also appeared in a range of medical journals. (Note: Examples of such obituaries include those that appeared in The Lancet, the Journal of the Royal College of Surgeons of Edinburgh, and Revue de Laryngologie, Otologie, Rhinologie, the latter by Georges Portmann with whom Negus had studied some five decades earlier.) In due course, biographical entries appeared in volume 6 of Lives of the Fellows of the Royal College of Surgeons of England (1988) and in the Oxford Dictionary of National Biography (2004). (Note: Negus was one of a range of medical and surgical figures whose portraits and brief biographies featured in a history of the Royal College of Surgeons of England, published in 2000 to mark its 200th anniversary. The entry for Negus is in the otolarnygology section of Chapter 15, 'Surgical Specialisation: Emergence of the Specialist Associations'.) Two photographic portraits of Negus are held in the collections of the National Portrait Gallery in London. (Note: The first photograph, by the Lafayette studio (see James Lafayette), is from 1928. The second photograph, by the Elliott & Fry studio, is from 1956.) As well as archives relating to Negus, the Royal College of Surgeons of England houses in its one of its reserve collections (the Hunterian Museum Collection) over 200 sagittal sections of animals dissected by him. Additional collections of bisected animal heads prepared by Negus are held at the Grant Museum of Zoology and Comparative Anatomy in London.

== Selected publications ==
Books

- The Mechanism of the Larynx (Heinemann, 1929)
- Diseases of the Nose and Throat with St Clair Thomson (Cassell, 4th edition 1937; 5th edition 1948; 6th edition 1955)
- Comparative Anatomy and Physiology of the Larynx (Heinemann, 1949)
- Comparative Anatomy and Physiology of the Nose and Paranasal Sinuses (Livingstone, 1958)
- The Biology of Respiration (Williams and Wilkins, 1965)

Articles

- 1924: "The Course of Endoscopy in Chevalier Jackson's Service". The Journal of Laryngology & Otology 39 (3): 145–149
- 1957: "The Evolutionary History of Man from the Evidence of the Nose and Larynx". Archives of Otolaryngology 66 (4): 414–429
- 1958: "Obituary: Dr. Chevalier Jackson". The Journal of Laryngology & Otology 72 (10): 843–844
- 1960: "Further Observations on the Air Conditioning Mechanism of the Nose". Annals of the Royal College of Surgeons of England 27 (3): 171–204
- 1968: "Sir St. Clair Thomson (1859–1943)". Archives of Otolaryngology 87 (6): 667–672
- 1971: "Voice". Annals of the Royal College of Surgeons of England 48 (6): 369–376

Named lectures

- 1924 Arris and Gale Lecture: "On the Mechanism of the Larynx"
- 1930 Semon Lecture: "Observations on Semon's Law"
- 1954 Hunterian Lecture: NEGUS VE (September 1954). "Introduction to the Comparative Anatomy of the Nose and Paranasal Sinuses". Ann R Coll Surg Engl. 15 (3): 141–71. PMC 2377799. PMID 13198060.
- 1955 Lister Oration: NEGUS VE (May 1955). "The Comparative Anatomy and Physiology of the Respiratory Tract in Relation to Clinical Problems". Ann R Coll Surg Engl. 16 (5): 281–304. PMC 2377889. PMID 14377313.
- 1957 Johns Hopkins Lecture: Negus VE (October 1957). "The etiology of pharyngeal diverticula". Bull Johns Hopkins Hosp. 101 (4): 209–23. PMID 13472247.
