= St Clair Thomson =

British surgeon and professor of laryngology

St Clair Thomson MB MRCS
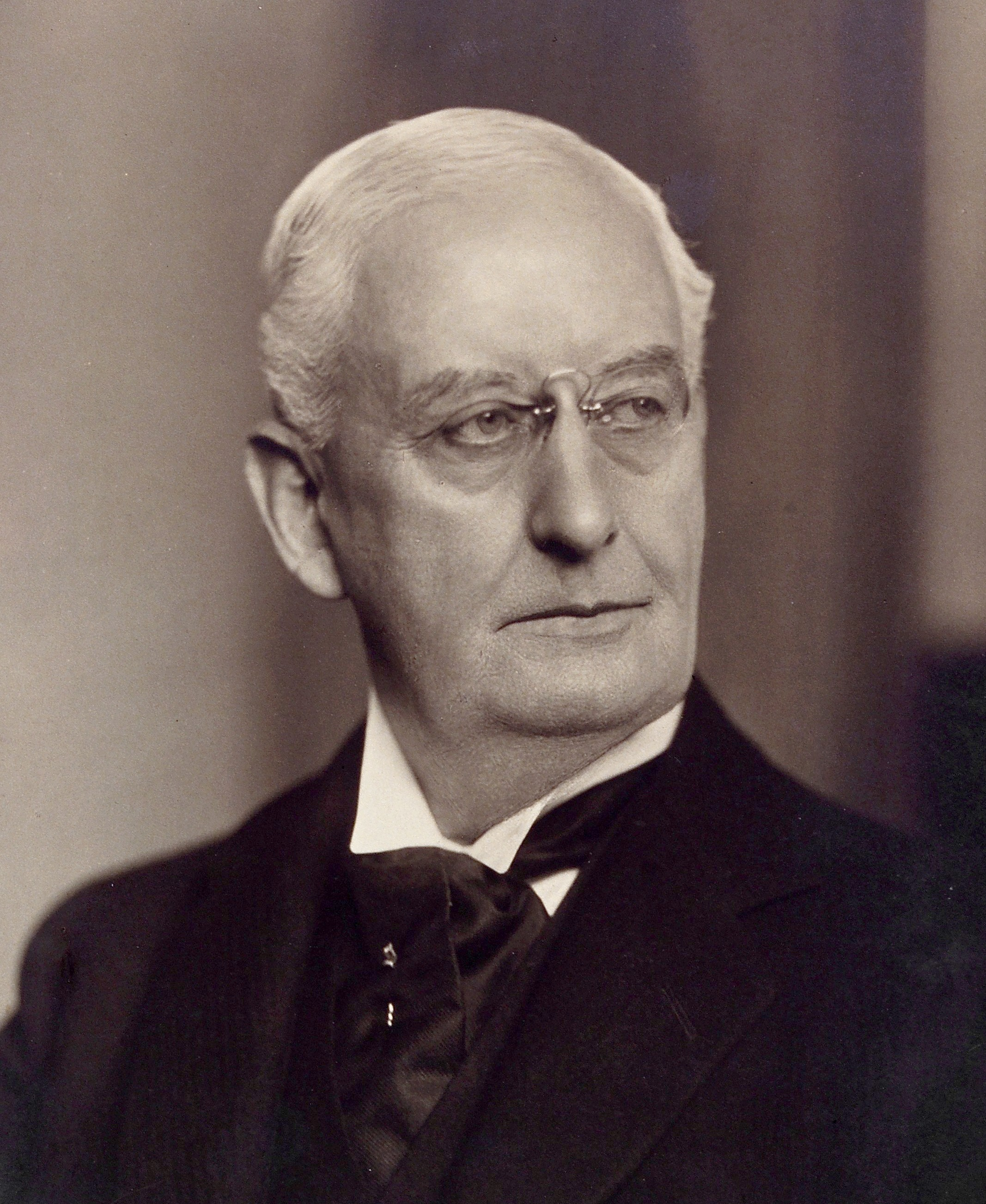
- Sir St Clair Thomson
- Born: 28 July 1859; Fahan, Inishowen, County Donegal, Ulster, Ireland
- Died: 29 January 1943 (aged 83); Edinburgh, Scotland
- Occupation: Professor of Laryngology

Signature
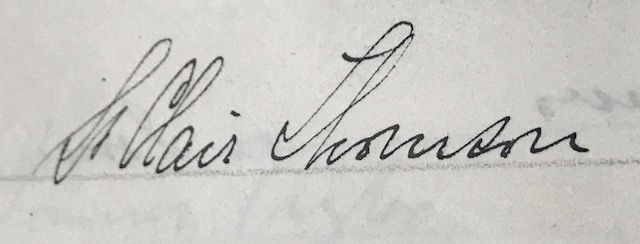

St Clair Thomson (1859–1943) was a leading British laryngologist and surgeon. After training under Sir Joseph Lister, he became a prominent throat physician to King Edward VII, a Professor at King’s College Hospital, and President of the Royal Society of Medicine.

== Life ==
Thomson was born at Fahan (pronounced 'Fawn'), a village in Inishowen in County Donegal on the north coast of Ulster, the northern province in Ireland, the seventh child of the five sons and three daughters of John Gibson Thomson of Ardrishaig, Argyllshire, Scotland, civil engineer, a pupil of Thomas Telford, and his wife Catherine, a daughter of John Sinclair of Lochaline, Morven, Sound of Mull. He was educated at the village school in Ardrishaig till he was ten, when he went to study at King's School, Peterborough, later gaining medical experience in general practice while apprenticed to his eldest brother William Sinclair-Thomson MD. Thomson's medical studies, started privately, continued from 1877 at King's College London. He entered King's College Hospital on 1 October 1877, the same day that Joseph Lister took up his appointment as Professor of Clinical Surgery. He gained the qualifications MRCS (Member of the Royal College of Surgeons) in 1881 and MB (Bachelor of Medicine) in 1883. He then became house surgeon to Sir Joseph Lister at King's College Hospital.

== Career ==
Thomson went on to work at Queen Charlotte's Hospital and as a surgeon on ships operated by Union-Castle Line on routes to South Africa. This was followed by several years as a physician in Europe, practising medicine in Florence and St Moritz. In the early 1890s he developed his professional interests beyond general practice and turned towards the study of laryngology. Famous laryngologists he visited in Vienna included Leopold von Schrötter and Karl Stoerk, along with the Austrian otologist Ádám Politzer. He also studied with German laryngologist Gustav Killian at Freiburg.

Thomson established himself as a consultant laryngologist following his return to London in 1893. After obtaining the further qualification FRCS (Fellow of the Royal College of Surgeons), he lectured in medicine, carried out research, and helped edit the journal The Laryngoscope. His career in medicine and his chosen speciality advanced from surgeon (at the Royal Ear Hospital) and physician (at the Throat Hospital in Golden Square) to FRCP (1903) and "physician in charge" at King's College Hospital in 1905, culminating in the post of professor of laryngology at King's in 1908. Another peak of his career was his appointment as throat physician to King Edward VII. Thomson was knighted in 1912. During the First World War he was appointed a Commander of the Order of Leopold for services to Belgium. After his retirement from medical practice at King's in 1924, he held positions at the Royal College of Physicians as examiner and member of the council. He lectured on tuberculosis of the larynx, and received the 1936 Weber-Parkes Medal for his tuberculosis research. Thomson also lectured and wrote on the subject of Shakespeare and medicine.

Major publications that Thomson authored or co-authored included Diseases of the Nose and Throat (1911) and Cancer of the Larynx (1930). Professional societies in which he held positions included the Medical Society of London (President in 1915-16) and the British Medical Association. He was also president of the Royal Society of Medicine from 1925 to 1927 and president of its History of Medicine Section from 1933 to 1935.

Thomson had married in 1901, but his wife Isabella died less than five years later in 1905. Thomson never remarried. His home in Wimpole Street in London, kept by his elder sister Matilda (Maud) Louisa Sinclair-Thomson, housed his collection of Shakespearian prints, miniatures and pharmacy jars. Photographic portraits of Thomson, taken in 1938 by British photographer Howard Coster, are held at the National Portrait Gallery. Having settled in Scotland following wartime damage to his London home, Thomson was killed in a street accident in Edinburgh on 29 January 1943 at the age of 83.
