= Karl Stoerk =

Austrian laryngologist

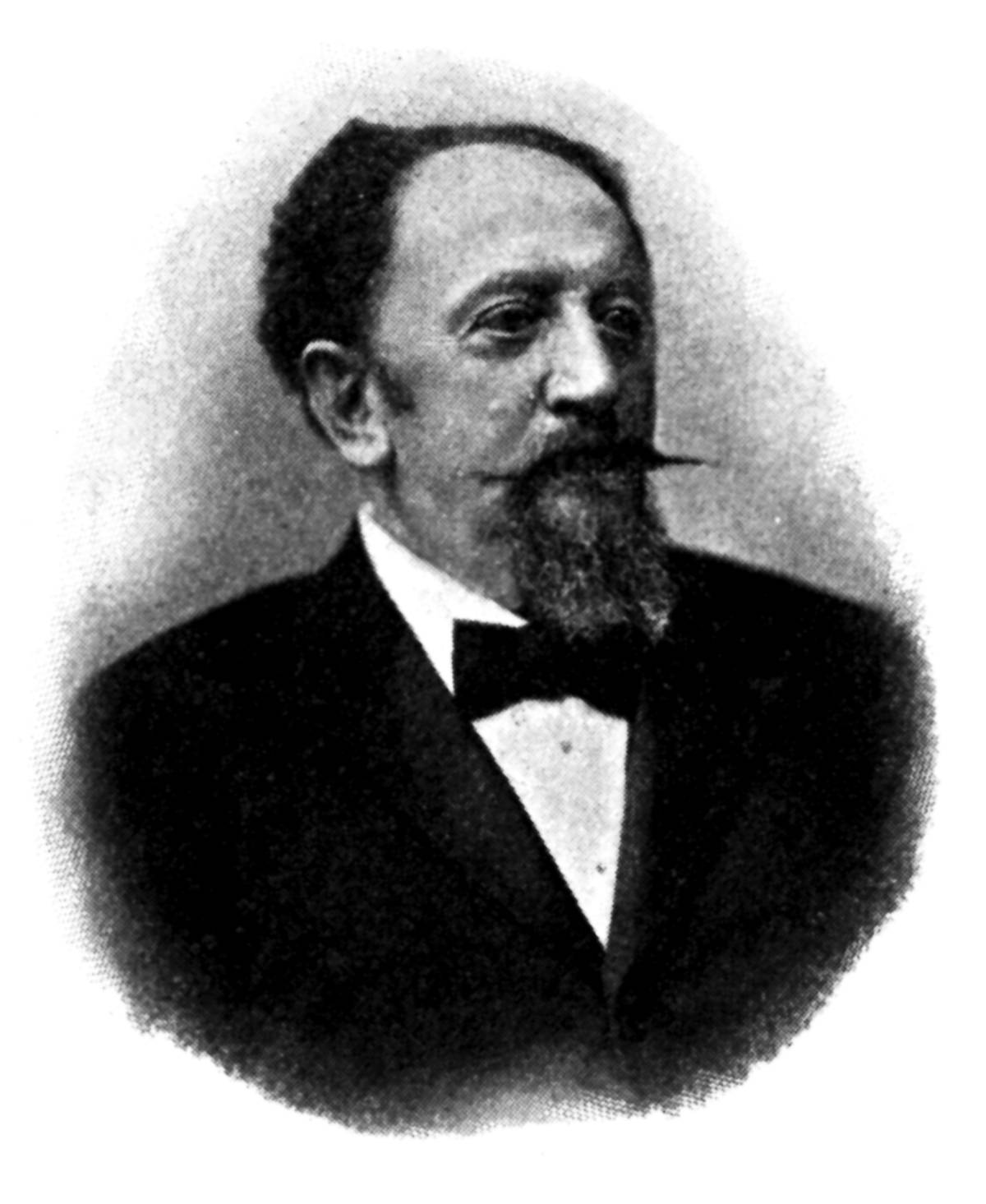
Karl Stoerk.

Karl Stoerk (German: Störk, 17 September 1832 – 13 September 1899) was an Austrian laryngologist who was a native of Ofen.

He studied medicine at the Universities of Prague and Vienna, and received his doctorate in 1858. Afterwards he was an assistant to Ludwig Türck (1810–1868) in Vienna, where he practiced medicine for the remainder of his career. In 1891 Stoerk was appointed head of the laryngological clinic.

Along with Leopold von Schrötter (1837–1908) and Johann Schnitzler (1835–1893), Stoerk was a catalyst in making Vienna a major center of laryngological research in the late 19th century. He demonstrated the possibility of applying remedies into the larynx and throat assisted by a laryngoscope. He also devised several medical instruments, including an early esophagoscope that was modification of the "Waldenburg esophagoscope". Stoerk's endoscopic device consisted of three telescopic tubes with a bendable mechanism.

== Eponymy ==
"Stoerk's blennorrhea": free discharge of mucus producing hypertrophy of the mucosa of the nose, pharynx, and larynx.

== Selected writings ==
- Laryngoscopische Mittheilungen, Vienna, (1863) - Laryngoscopic communications.
- Laryngoscopische Operationen, ib. 1870 (second edition in 1872) - Laryngoscopic operations.
- Beiträge zur Heilung des Parenchym und Cystenkropfes, Erlangen, 1874 - Contributions to healing of the parenchyma and cystic goiters.
- Mittheilungen über Asthma Bronchiale und die Mechanische Lungenbehandlung, Stuttgart, (1875) - Communications on bronchial asthma, etc.
- Klinik der Krankheiten des Kehlkopfes, der Nase und des Rachens, ib. 1876-80 - Clinic of diseases of the larynx, nose and throat.
- Sprechen und Singen, Vienna, (1881) - Speaking and singing
- Die Erkrankungen der Nase, des Rachens und des Kehlkopfes, ib. 1895-97 - Diseases of the nose, pharynx and larynx.
