= Roy Calne =

British surgeon and pioneer in organ transplantation (1930–2024)

Sir Roy Calne FRS FRCS
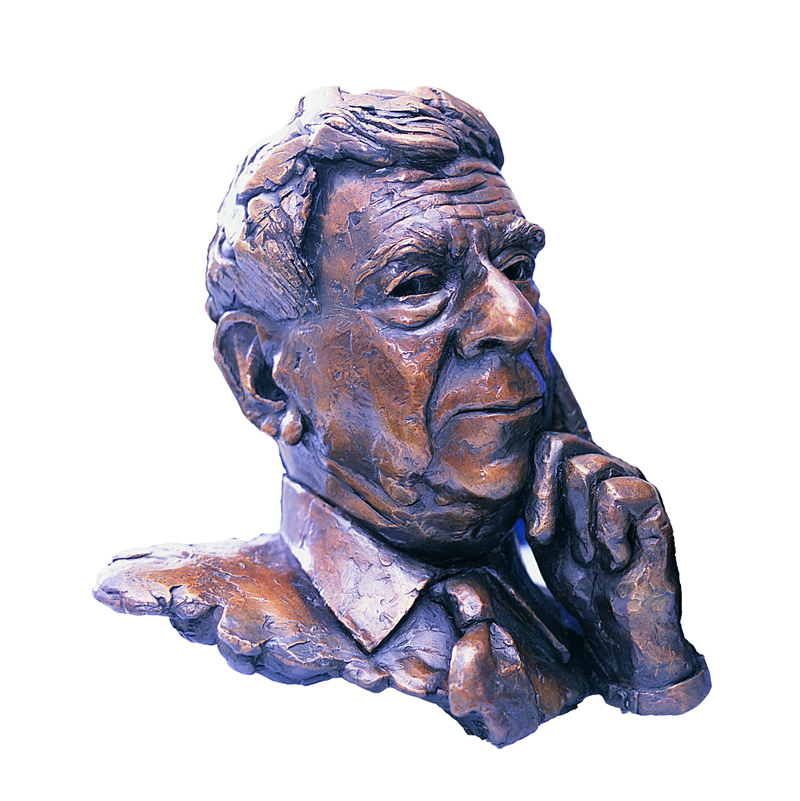
- A bronze bust of Calne by sculptor Laurence Broderick, outside the main operating theatres at Addenbrooke's Hospital
- Born: 30 December 1930; Richmond, Surrey, England
- Died: 6 January 2024 (aged 93); Cambridge, England
- Education: Lancing College; King's College London; Guy's Hospital Medical School
- Spouse: Patricia Whelan (m. 1956)
- Children: 6
- Medical career
- Profession: Surgeon
- Sub-specialties: Organ transplantation
- Awards: Lister Medal (1984); Cameron Prize for Therapeutics of the University of Edinburgh (1990); Ernst Jung Prize (1992); Prince Mahidol Award (2002); Pride of Britain Lifetime Achievement Award (2014)

Sir Roy Yorke Calne FRS FRCS (30 December 1930 – 6 January 2024) was a British surgeon and pioneer in organ transplantation. He was part of the team that performed the first liver transplantation operation in Europe in 1968, the world's first liver, heart and lung transplantation in 1987, the first intestinal transplant in the UK in 1992 and the first successful combined stomach, intestine, pancreas, liver and kidney cluster transplantation in 1994.

In 1960, Calne showed that 6-mercaptopurine (6-MP) could prolong the survival of a transplanted kidney in a dog, and later showed that azathioprine was more effective. Through the mid-1960s, he worked to develop solutions in surgical techniques and organ rejection. In the late 1970s, he began to experiment with the immunosuppressant ciclosporin A, which was then introduced into regular use to prevent organ rejection.

Calne was elected to the Royal Society in 1974, and was awarded the 1988 Cameron Prize for Therapeutics of the University of Edinburgh. He was awarded the 1984 Lister Medal, and knighted two years later. In 1990, he received the Ellison-Cliffe Medal from the Royal Society of Medicine. In 2012, he shared a Lasker-DeBakey Clinical Medical Research Award with Thomas Starzl.

== Early life and education ==
Roy Calne was born in Richmond, Surrey on 30 December 1930, to Joseph, a car engineer, and his wife Eileen (née Gubbay). He was the elder of two sons; his younger brother Donald later became a neurologist in Canada. Roy was educated at Dulwich Prep London and then Lancing College. Twice, he was evacuated to Ludlow, Shropshire. He gained his place at Guy's Hospital at the age of 16 years. There, he completed his medical education in 1952. For his national service, he served in the Royal Army Medical Corps between 1953 and 1955, being stationed with the Gurkhas. When he returned to England he took up a post teaching anatomy at Oxford University.

== Early career ==
In the late 1950s, with the encouragement of urologist John Hopewell and professor of physiology David Slome, and while a surgical trainee at the Royal Free Hospital, Calne worked at the Royal College of Surgeon's Buckston Browne Farm. After unsuccessful attempts at rat kidney grafts, he repeated the dog experiments of Jim Dempster and confirmed his findings of unsuccessful survival of kidneys with lethal doses of radiation. Calne then showed that 6-mercaptopurine (6-MP) could prolong the survival of a transplanted kidney in a dog. The findings were published in his landmark paper in February 1960 in The Lancet. He performed two unsuccessful human kidney transplants using 6-MP in 1960, and one the previous year.

Encouraged by Peter Medawar, Calne then earned a Harkness Fellowship to study 6-MP with dog transplant work at Harvard's Peter Bent Brigham Hospital with Joseph Murray and Francis Moore. After obtaining azathioprine, then known as BW57-322, from the Burroughs Wellcome Research Laboratories, Calne and Murray, in 1961, showed, in the first transplant using that drug, that it was a more effective immunosuppressant than 6-MP at prolonging the survival of transplanted kidneys in dogs. When either of these drugs was used in humans, survival rates remained low, and by 1963, Calne doubted successful transplantation. Two years earlier, he had taken a job at St Mary's Hospital. In 1964, Calne visited Tulane University, New Orleans, to learn of Keith Reemtsma's experiences with transplanting kidneys from chimpanzees, and persuaded London Zoo to assist when he returned to England. Through the mid-1960s, he worked to develop solutions in surgical techniques and organ rejection. In 1965 at Cambridge, he was appointed professor and chair of surgery, and teamed up with King's College liver specialist Roger Williams. Calne then performed the first liver transplantation operation in Europe in 1968.

In the late 1970s, with the help of the Agricultural Research Institute of Animal Physiology at Babraham, Calne worked on liver transplantation in pigs and began to experiment with the immunosuppressant ciclosporin A. By 1978, it was being used to prevent organ rejection in transplant operations.

== Later career ==
Calne performed the world's first liver, heart and lung transplantation with John Wallwork in 1987, the first intestinal transplant in the UK in 1992 and the first successful combined stomach, intestine, pancreas, liver and kidney cluster transplantion in 1994. In 1995, he stated that xenotransplantation "is just around the corner, but it may be a very long corner."

Calne was a Fellow of the Royal Society and was Professor of Surgery at Cambridge University between 1965 and 1998 where he initiated the kidney transplant programme. He was the Yeoh Ghim Seng Visiting professor of surgery at the National University of Singapore.

== Artistic career ==
Calne enjoyed drawing and painting from an early age. At school he was taught and encouraged by an art teacher Francis Russell Flint, son of the Scottish artist William Russell Flint. As a medical student in London he would regularly visit art galleries to copy the works of great masters. In 1988 he performed a liver transplant on the Scottish painter John Bellany, who began to paint self-portraits while still in intensive care and had completed 60 during his hospital stay. Bellany gave Calne painting lessons and the two became friends, painting portraits of each other. One of his portraits of Bellany was exhibited by the Royal Academy. Calne went on to paint some transplant patients, believing that it brought closeness and humanity to the surgeon-patient relationship, especially with children. An exhibition of his paintings entitled The Gift of Life was displayed at the Barbican in 1991. Other exhibitions of his artwork have intended to promote awareness of transplantation.

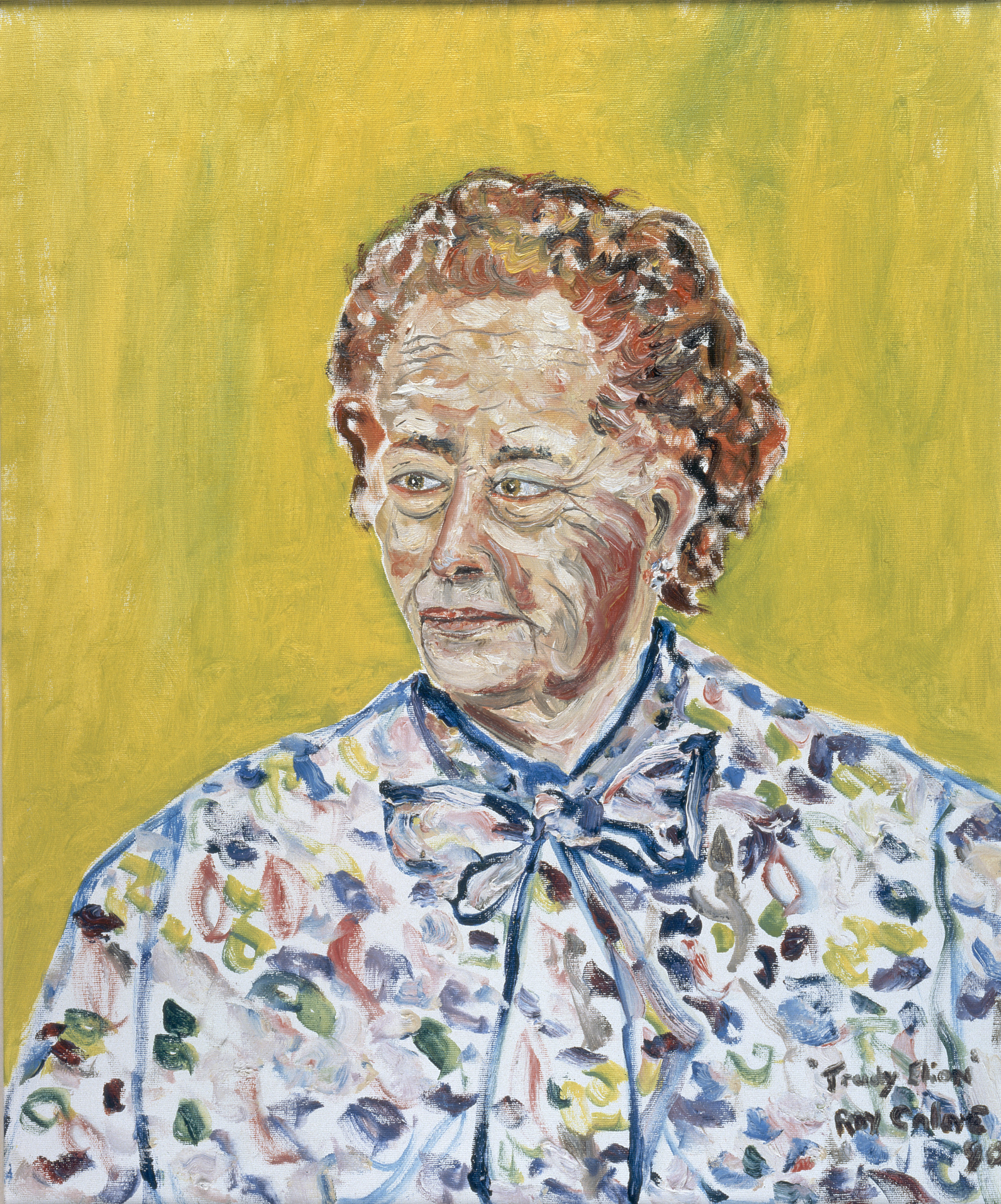
Gertrude Elion. Oil painting by Sir Roy Calne, 1990.

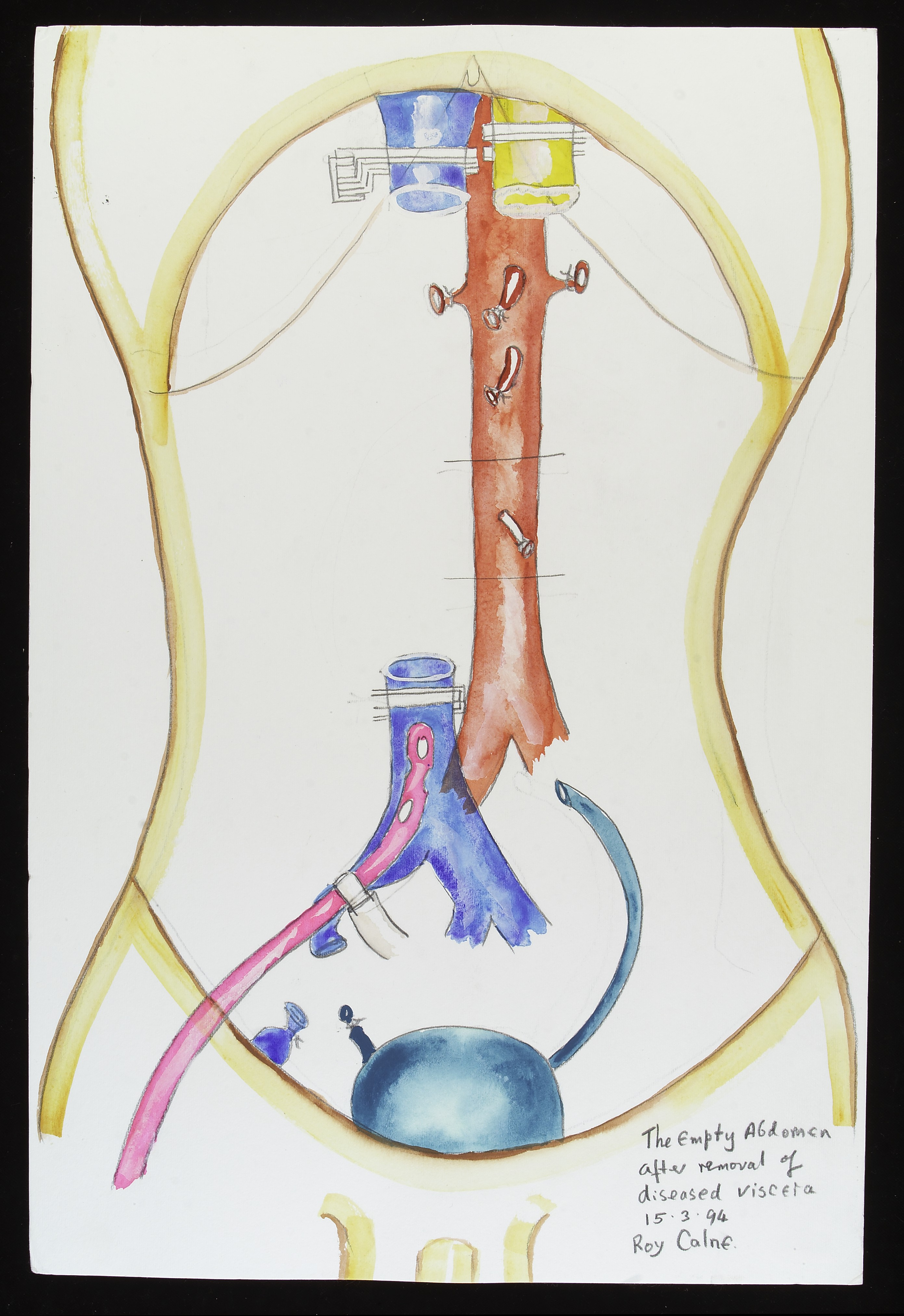
An empty abdomen during a six-organ transplant. Watercolour by Sir Roy Calne, 1994.

== Awards and honours ==
Calne was elected to the Royal Society in 1974, and was awarded the 1988 Cameron Prize for Therapeutics of the University of Edinburgh. He was awarded the 1984 Lister Medal for his contributions to surgical science. The corresponding Lister Oration, given at the Royal College of Surgeons of England on 21 May 1985, is titled "Organ transplantation: from laboratory to clinic".

Calne was knighted in the 1986 Birthday Honours. In 1990, he received the Ellison-Cliffe Medal from the Royal Society of Medicine. In 2012, he shared a Lasker-DeBakey Clinical Medical Research Award with Thomas Starzl "for the development of liver transplantation, which has restored normal life to thousands of patients with end-stage liver disease". He was awarded a Pride of Britain Award in 2014.

Calne was a member and patron of Humanists UK and he was an Honorary Vice-president of the Cambridge University Lawn Tennis Club.

== Personal ==
In 1956, Calne married Patricia Whelan, a nurse, and they had six children; four daughters and two sons.

== Death ==
Calne died of heart failure in Cambridge on 6 January 2024, a week after his 93rd birthday.

== Selected publications ==
=== Articles ===
- CALNE RY (February 1960). "The rejection of renal homografts. Inhibition in dogs by 6-mercaptopurine". The Lancet. 275 (7121): 417–418. doi:10.1016/s0140-6736(60)90343-3. PMID 13807024.
- HOPEWELL J; CALNE RY; BESWICK I (15 February 1964). "Three Clinical Cases of Renal Transplantation". British Medical Journal. 1 (5380): 396.1–413. doi:10.1136/bmj.1.5380.396. ISSN 0007-1447. PMC 1813354. PMID 14085970. (Co-author)
- Calne, R.Y; Thiru, S.; McMaster, P.; Craddock, G.N; White, D.J.G; Evans, D.B; Dunn, D.C; Pentlow, B.D; Rolles, Keith (2 December 1978). "Cyclosporin A in patients receiving renal allografts from cadaver donors". Lancet. 2 (8104–5): 1323–1327. doi:10.1016/s0140-6736(78)91970-0. ISSN 0140-6736. PMID 82836. S2CID 10731038.(Co-author)

=== Books ===
- Ellis, Harold, 1926–, Calne, Roy Y. (Roy Yorke), Sir, 1930– and Christopher Watson (2011) Lecture notes on general surgery (Twelfth edition). Oxford : Wiley Blackwell. ISBN 978-1-4443-3440-1.
- Calne, Roy Y. (Roy Yorke), Sir, 1930– (1970) A Gift of Life: Observations on Organ Transplantation. New York : Basic Books. ISBN 0-465-02675-3, ISBN 978-0-465-02675-3
- Calne, Roy Y. (Roy Yorke), Sir, 1930– (1996) Art, Surgery and Transplantation. London : Williams & Wilkins Europe. ISBN 0-683-23094-8, ISBN 978-0-683-23094-9

== Bibliography ==
- Hakim, Nadey; Haberal, Mehmet; Maluf, Daniel, eds. (2020). Transplantation Surgery (2nd ed.). Switzerland: Springer. ISBN 978-3-030-55243-5.
- Hamilton, David (2012). A History of Organ Transplantation: Ancient Legends to Modern Practice. University of Pittsburgh Press. ISBN 978-0-8229-4413-3.
