= Ludwig Türck =

Austrian neurologist

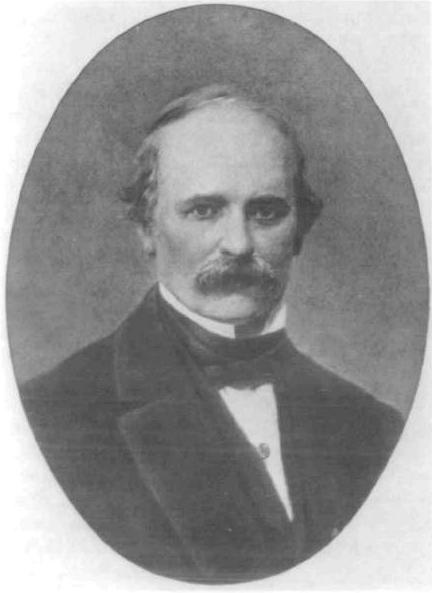
Ludwig Türck (1810-1868)

Ludwig Türck (22 July 1810 – 25 February 1868) was an Austrian neurologist who was a native of Vienna.

In 1836 he obtained his medical doctorate from the University of Vienna, where in 1864 he became a full professor.

He is remembered for his pioneer investigations of the central nervous system, particularly his studies involving nerve fiber localization, direction and degeneration. His name is lent to the "bundle of Türck", which are uncrossed fibers forming a small bundle in the pyramidal tract. Today this bundle of fibers is usually called by its clinical name: the anterior corticospinal tract. In medical literature, the terms "Türck's bundle", "Türck's column" and "Türck's tract" are also used for the anterior corticospinal tract.

During the latter part of the 1850s, Türck, along with physiologist Johann Nepomuk Czermak (1828-1873) were responsible for introducing the laryngoscope into medicine. Among Türck's assistants and students in Vienna were laryngologists Karl Stoerk (1832-1899), Leopold von Schrötter (1837-1908) and Johann Schnitzler (1835-1893).

== Selected writings ==
- Praktische Anleitung zur Laryngoskopie (Practical guide to laryngoscopy); (1860)
- Klinik der Krankheiten des Kehlkopfes und der Luftröhre, nebst einer Anleitung zum Gebrauche des Kehlkopfrachenspiegels und zur Lokalbehandlung der Kehlkopfkrankheiten (1866)
- Über Hautsensibilitätsbezirke der einzelnen Rückenmarksnervenpaare (Investigations of the cutaneous distribution of the separate pairs of spinal nerves) (1869); with Carl Wedl (1815-1891).
