= Patrick Forrest =

Scottish surgeon (1923–2021)

Sir Patrick Forrest FRCS FRCPE FRSE
- Born: 25 March 1923; Mount Vernon, Glasgow, Scotland
- Died: 7 August 2021 (aged 98); Edinburgh, Scotland
- Education: University of St Andrews
- Employers: University of Glasgow; Welsh National School of Medicine; University of Edinburgh
- Awards: Lister Medal (1987)

Sir Andrew Patrick McEwen Forrest FRCS FRCPE FRSE (25 March 1923 – 7 August 2021) was a Scottish surgeon.

After qualifying in medicine from the University of St Andrews and completing a Fellowship at the Mayo in Rochester, Minnesota, he took up surgical posts first in Glasgow, then in Wales, followed by a position as Regius Chair of Clinical Surgery at Edinburgh.

His achievements in the field of breast cancer earned him the Lister Medal in 1987.

== Life ==
Forrest was born in Lanarkshire and educated at the High School of Dundee. He then studied medicine at the University of St Andrews.

Following military service with the Royal Navy as a medical officer, he spent a year in Rochester, Minnesota as a Mayo Foundation Fellow, then in 1955 obtained a position at the University of Glasgow.

He became Chair of Surgery at the Welsh National School of Medicine in 1962. He moved to the University of Edinburgh to take up the Regius Chair of Clinical Surgery in 1971, where he eventually became emeritus.

He also served as Chief Scientist to the Scottish Scottish Home and Health Department, and chaired the Department of Health working group on the implementation of the NHS Programme on breast cancer screening.

In 1961 Forrest was elected a member of the Harveian Society of Edinburgh and served as president in 1984. He was elected a member of The Royal Society of Edinburgh in 1976. In 1983 he was elected a member of the Aesculapian Club.

He died on 7 August 2021, at the age of 98.

== Awards ==
Forrest received the Umberto Veronesi Award for the Future Fight Against Breast Cancer (2000). In 1987, he received the Lister Medal, "in recognition of his outstanding contribution to surgical science, particularly in the field of breast cancer".

== Publications ==
- Principles and Practice of Surgery
- Breast Cancer: The Decision to Screen (1990)
