= Regius Professor of Clinical Surgery =

Royal professorship in the University of Edinburgh, Scotland

The Regius Chair of Clinical Surgery is a royal professorship in the University of Edinburgh, Scotland. It was established by George III in 1802 in the university's Faculty of Medicine.

== Regius Professors of Clinical Surgery ==
- Professor James Russell (1802)
- Professor James Syme (1833)
- Lord Joseph Lister (1869)
- Professor Thomas Annandale (1877)
- Professor Francis Mitchell Caird (1908)
- Sir Harold Stiles (1919)
- Sir John Fraser (1927)
- Sir James Learmonth (1946)
- Sir John Bruce (1956)
- Sir Patrick Forrest (1971)
- Sir David Carter (1988)
- Professor O. James Garden (2000)
- Professor Stephen Wigmore (2019)
