= Anton Eiselsberg =

Austrian neurosurgeon (1860–1939)

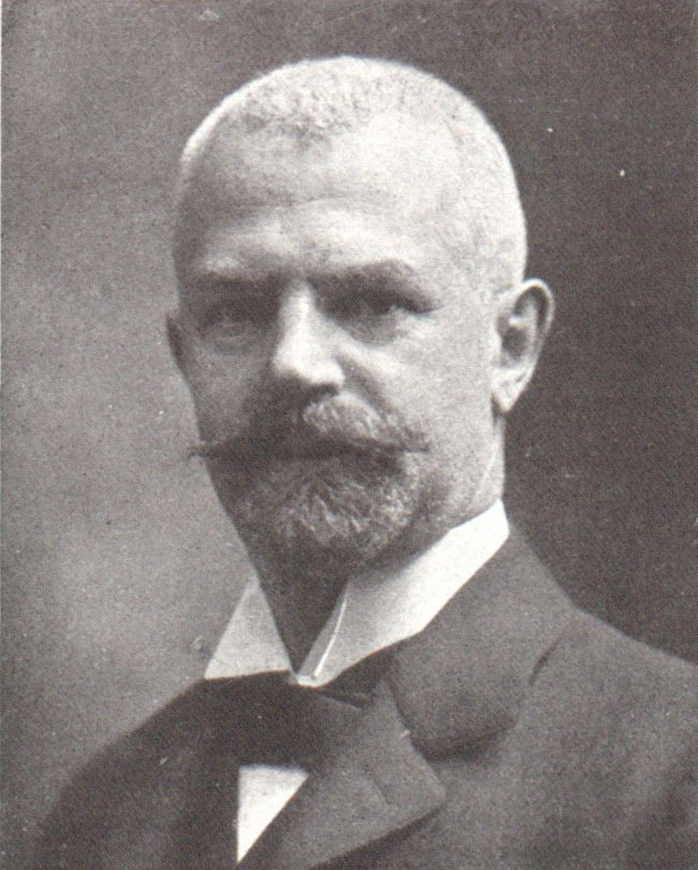
- Anton Eiselsberg, 1917
- Born: 31 July 1860; Schloss Steinhaus, Upper Austria
- Died: 25 October 1939 (aged 79); St. Valentin, Lower Austria
- Scientific career
- Fields: neurosurgery
- Workplaces: Utrecht University

Anton Freiherr von Eiselsberg (31 July 1860 – 25 October 1939) was an Austrian neurosurgeon.

== Biography ==
A student of Theodor Billroth, Eiselsberg served as professor of medicine at Utrecht University and at University of Königsberg before being appointed head of the First Department of Surgery at the University of Vienna. He was one of the founders of neurosurgery, co-founder of the Austrian Cancer Society in 1910, and an honorary member of the Austrian Academy of Sciences. It was his initiative that lead to the creation of the world-first emergency surgery station in Vienna, dramatically increasing the effectiveness of medical intervention after accidents.

In 1907 Eiselsberg performed the first successful removal of a spinal cord tumor. Operating with only crude X-rays, he actually located the tumor primarily on the basis of the symptoms of the patient.

Eiselsberg was awarded the second Lister Medal in 1927 for his contributions to surgical science. As part of the award, he was invited to give the Lister Memorial Lecture at the Royal College of Surgeons of England in July 1927.

He himself died during the early days of World War II in an accident caused by the collision of two trains in the vicinity of St. Valentin, Lower Austria, on 25 October 1939.

He was one of the greatest surgeons, teachers and clinical researchers of his time. Billroth described him as "my best student." In 1909 he founded, along with Julius Hochenegg the world's first model emergency rooms. Eiselsberg and Hochenegg are considered "fathers of the emergency rooms" (ER).

== Publications ==
- Die Werkstatt des Chirurgen. 1912.
- Die Hypophyse. Vienna, 1930.
- Lebensweg eines Chirurgen. Vienna, Tyrolia, 1938.

== Decorations and awards ==
- 1903: Councillor
- 1905: Honorary Membership of the Royal College of Surgeons of Edinburgh
- 1927: Lister Medal (awarded as the second prize winner) of the Royal College of Surgeons of England
- 1931: Honorary citizen of the City of Vienna
- 1932: Honorary Member of the Austrian Academy of Sciences
- 1932: Austrian Cross of Honour for Science and Art, 1st class
- Seven honorary doctorates
- Komturkreuzes of the Austrian Order of Merit
