= Lister Medal =

Award for contributions to surgical science

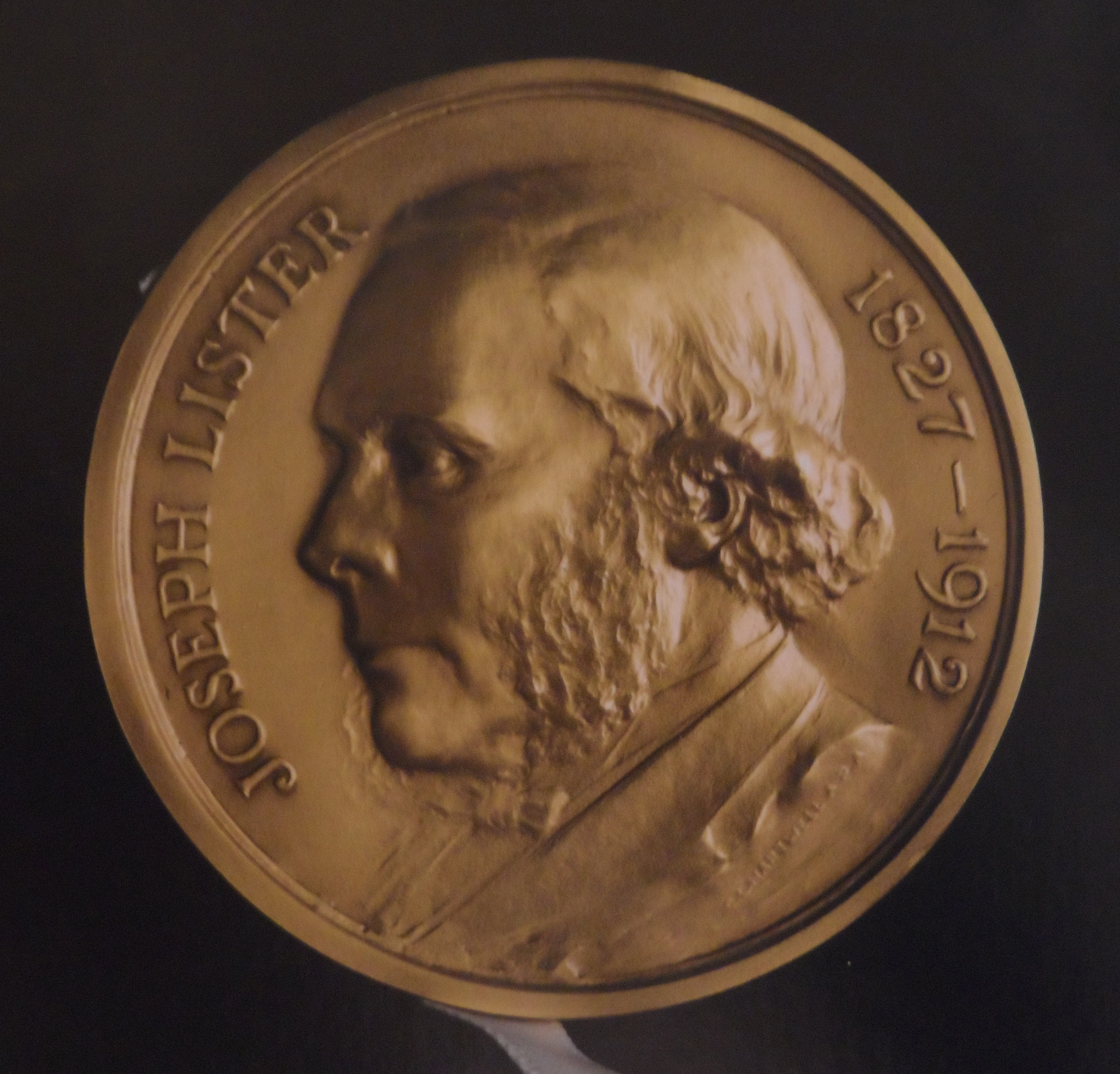
Obverse of the Lister Medal, with a representation of a bust of Lord Lister

The Lister Medal is an award presented by the Royal College of Surgeons of England in recognition of contributions to surgical science. It is named after the English surgeon Joseph Lister (1827–1912), whose work on antiseptics established the basis of modern sterile surgery.

The medal has its origins in the Lister Memorial Fund, started by the Royal Society, which was raised by public subscription after Lister's death, with the object of creating a lasting mark of respect to his memory. In 1920, the Royal College of Surgeons of England became the trustees and administrators of the fund. They were entrusted with the task of awarding a monetary prize and a bronze medal (gold since 1984) every three years, irrespective of nationality, to those who had made outstanding contributions to surgical science. The triennial award is decided by a committee representing the Royal Society, the Royal College of Surgeons of England, the Royal College of Surgeons in Ireland, the University of Edinburgh, and the University of Glasgow.

The Lister Medal, although it is not always awarded to a surgeon, is one of the most prestigious honours a surgeon can receive. The obverse of the medal consists of a representation of a bust of Lord Lister. The reverse side has the recipient's name across centre, and around the edge of the medal is text naming the award along with the dedication:

FOR DISTINGUISHED CONTRIBUTIONS TO SURGICAL SCIENCE

On the occasion of the award, the medallist delivers the Lister Oration (sometimes called the "Lister Memorial Lecture"). The first award was announced in 1924, with the presentation and the lecture taking place the following year. The most recent award was made in 2015, with a total of 27 people having received the medal to date.

== Medallists ==
Year	Medallist	Date of lecture	Title of lecture	Notes
1924	William Watson Cheyne	14 May 1925	'Lister and his Achievement'	(Note: See also: Memorial Lecture 'On Lister's Great Achievement' (report published in The Lancet, in the issue of 16 May 1925). This was followed by the more substantial publication of the lecture in book form.)
1927	Anton Eiselsberg	7 July 1927	[Reported under various titles - see notes]	(Note: See also: 'The Lister Medallist' (report published in The Lancet, in the issue of 16 July 1927) and Lister: A Continental Appreciation (report published in the British Medical Journal, in the issue of 16 July 1927).)
1930	Harvey Williams Cushing	9 July 1930	'Neurohypophysial mechanisms from a clinical standpoint'	
1933	Charles Alfred Ballance	5 April 1933	'On Nerve Surgery'	(Note: See also: 'Lister and his Time' (abstract published in The Lancet, in the issue of 15 April 1933). This was followed by the more substantial publication of the lecture in book form.)
1936	Robert Muir	7 April 1936	'Malignancy with illustrations from the pathology of the mamma'	
1939	René Leriche	5 April 1939	'The Listerian Idea in the Year 1939'	
1942	Evarts Ambrose Graham	25 September 1947	'Some Aspects of Bronchiogenic Carcinoma'	
1945	Howard Florey	11 October 1945	'The Use of Micro-organisms for Therapeutic Purposes'	(Note: Florey's award was made "for the outstanding importance to surgical science of his work on penicillin and its application".)
1948	Geoffrey Jefferson	9 June 1949	'The Mind of Mechanical Man'	(Note: Jefferson's award was made for his "knowledge of the functions and structure of the nervous system, made as a philosophical biologist, practising neurosurgery".)
1951	James Rognvald Learmonth	4 April 1952	'After Fifty-Six Years'	
1954	Victor Ewings Negus	5 April 1955	'The Comparative Anatomy and Physiology of the Respiratory Tract in Relation to Clinical Problems'	(Note: Negus's award was made in recognition of "services to the advancement of knowledge in the surgery of the nose and throat by means of his researches into the comparative anatomy and physiology of the larynx and paranasal sinuses".)
1957	William Stewart Duke-Elder	28 March 1958	'The Emergence of Vision in the Animal World'	(Note: Duke-Elder's award was made "in recognition of his services to the advancement of knowledge by means of his researches and writings in ophthalmic medicine and surgery".)
1960	Wilder Graves Penfield	27 April 1961	'Activation of the Record of Human Experience'	(Note: Penfield's award was made "in recognition of his service to the advancement of medical and biological knowledge, especially in the fields of neurology, surgical neurology, and psychology; and equally as humane surgical healer and as scientific researcher".)
1963	Charles Frederick William Illingworth	9 April 1964	'On the Interdependence of Science and the Healing Art'	(Note: Illingworth's's award was made "for his devotion to surgical science over a long period; and in particular for his contributions to knowledge of jaundice and diseases of the biliary tract, of peptic ulcer, and of the endocrine aspects of the treatment of cancer; and for his perception of the importance of the use of oxygen in treatment under hyperbaric conditions as a field for physiological research".)
1966	Russell Claude Brock	4 April 1967	'Surgery and Lister'	(Note: Brock's award was made "for his distinguished contributions to the surgery of the heart and lungs; and in particular his elucidation of the broncho-pulmonary segments which inspired the segmental surgery of the lung, and to his pioneer work on the correction of valvular derangements of the heart, and the use of hypothermia in cardiac surgery".)
1969	Michael Francis Addison Woodruff	8 April 1970	'Biological aspects of individuality'	(Note: Woodruff's award was made "for his continuing development of experimental and laboratory endeavour in transplantation immunology and the application of the scientific principles emerging from his work to the practice of transplantation surgery".)
1972	John Webster Kirklin	11 April 1973	'An Academic Surgeon's Work'	(Note: Kirklin's award was made "in recognition of his work in the development of open-heart surgery and his ability in organizing a department of surgery".)
1975	John Charnley	26 May 1976	'Aspects of total asepsis in the operating room with special reference to clean air systems'	(Note: Charnley's award was made "for his original and distinguished contributions, both scientific and technical, in the development of total joint replacement". The lecture title was variously announced as 'The origins of post-operative sepsis in elective surgery' and 'Aspects of total asepsis in the operating room with special reference to clean air systems'. The latter title is given on page 255 of John Charnley: the man and the hip (1990, Springer-Verlag), by William Waugh, who reports that the lecture was not published.)
1978	Francis Daniels Moore	23 May 1979	'Science and service'	(Note: Moore's award was made "for his original and distinguished contributions, both scientific and clinical, to the study and application of metabolic care of the severely ill patient".)
1981	John Cedric Goligher	6 April 1983	'The Skeptical Chirurgeon'	(Note: Goligher's award was made "for his original and distinguished contributions to clinical surgery, which have been influential throughout the field of gastrointestinal surgery but especially in the treatment of colorectal carcinoma and ulcerative colitis".)
1984	Roy Yorke Calne	21 May 1985	'Organ transplantation: from laboratory to clinic'	(Note: Calne's award was made "in recognition of [...] distinguished contributions to transplantation surgery over the past 25 years, during which period he has been a pioneer in this field. He introduced the first successful use of chemical immunosuppression, initiated one of the earliest renal transplant programmes in the United Kingdom, has pioneered the first European clinical liver grafting programme [...] and has introduced cyclosporin as an effective immunosuppressive agent.")
1987	Patrick Forrest	7 April 1988	'Breast cancer: 121 years on'	(Note: Forrest's award was made "in recognition of his outstanding contribution to surgical science, particularly in the field of breast cancer".)
1990	Harold Horace Hopkins	11 April 1991	'The development of the modern endoscopes - present and future prospects'	(Note: Hopkins' award was made "in recognition of his contribution in the field of fibreoptics and its applications". The theme of his lecture followed that of a paper he published a decade earlier in 1980: 'The development of the modern endoscope'.)
1994	Norman Edward Shumway		'Transplantation of the heart'	
1997	Peter John Morris	10 September 1998	'Kidney transplantation: a remarkable story of science and surgery'	
2010	Graeme Clark	4 November 2010	'What can electrical stimulation with a cochlear implant tell us about Brain Function and Human Consciousness?'	(Note: Clark's award was made "in recognition of his contribution to surgical science" relating to his research on "the multi-channel cochlear implant".)
2015	Magdi Yacoub	28 October 2015	'The Glory and Threat of Science and Medicine'	(Note: Yacoub's award was made "in recognition of his contribution to surgical science" relating to his research in cardiac and transplant surgery.)

Recent medallists

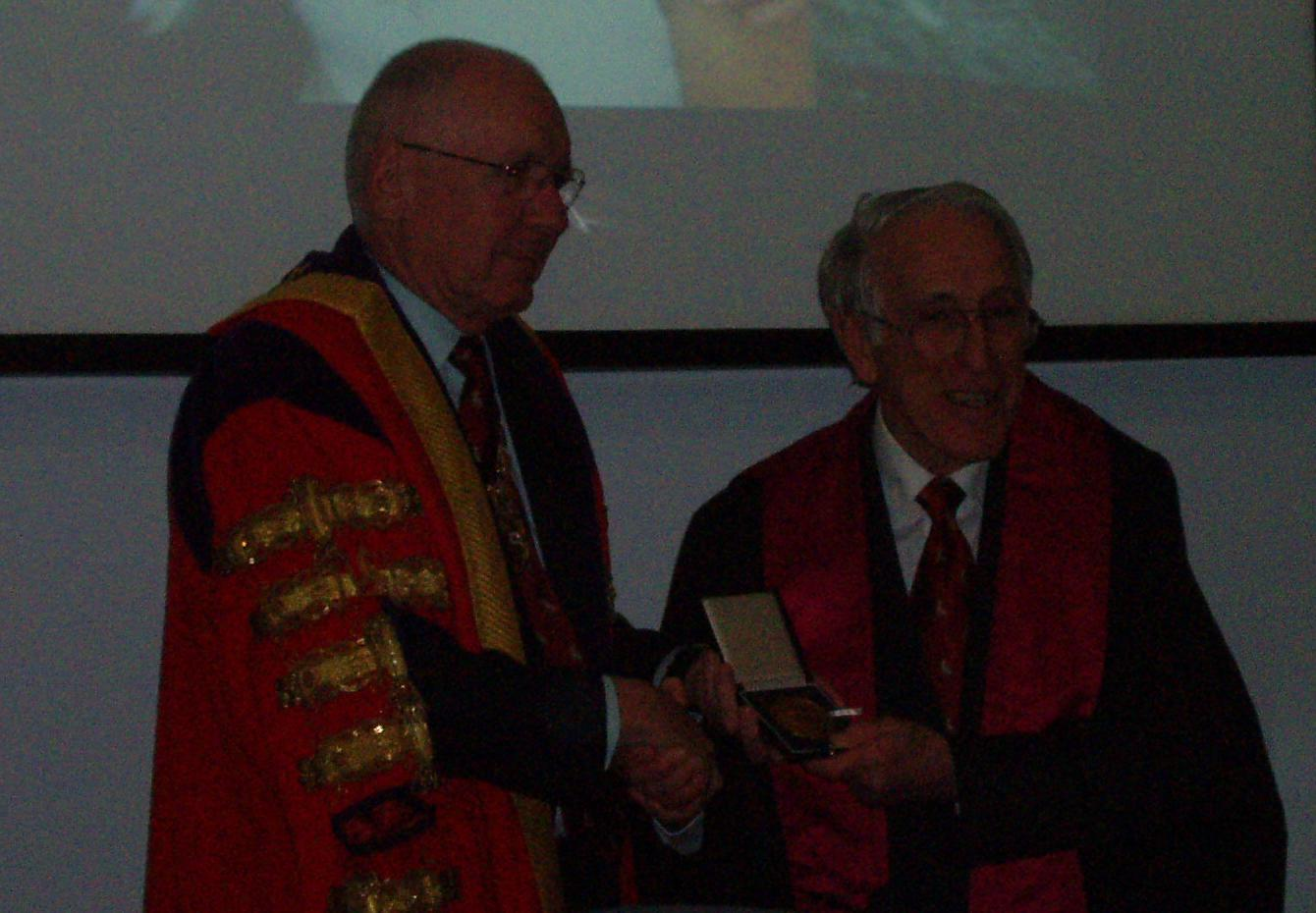
Graeme Clark (right) receiving the 2010 Lister Medal

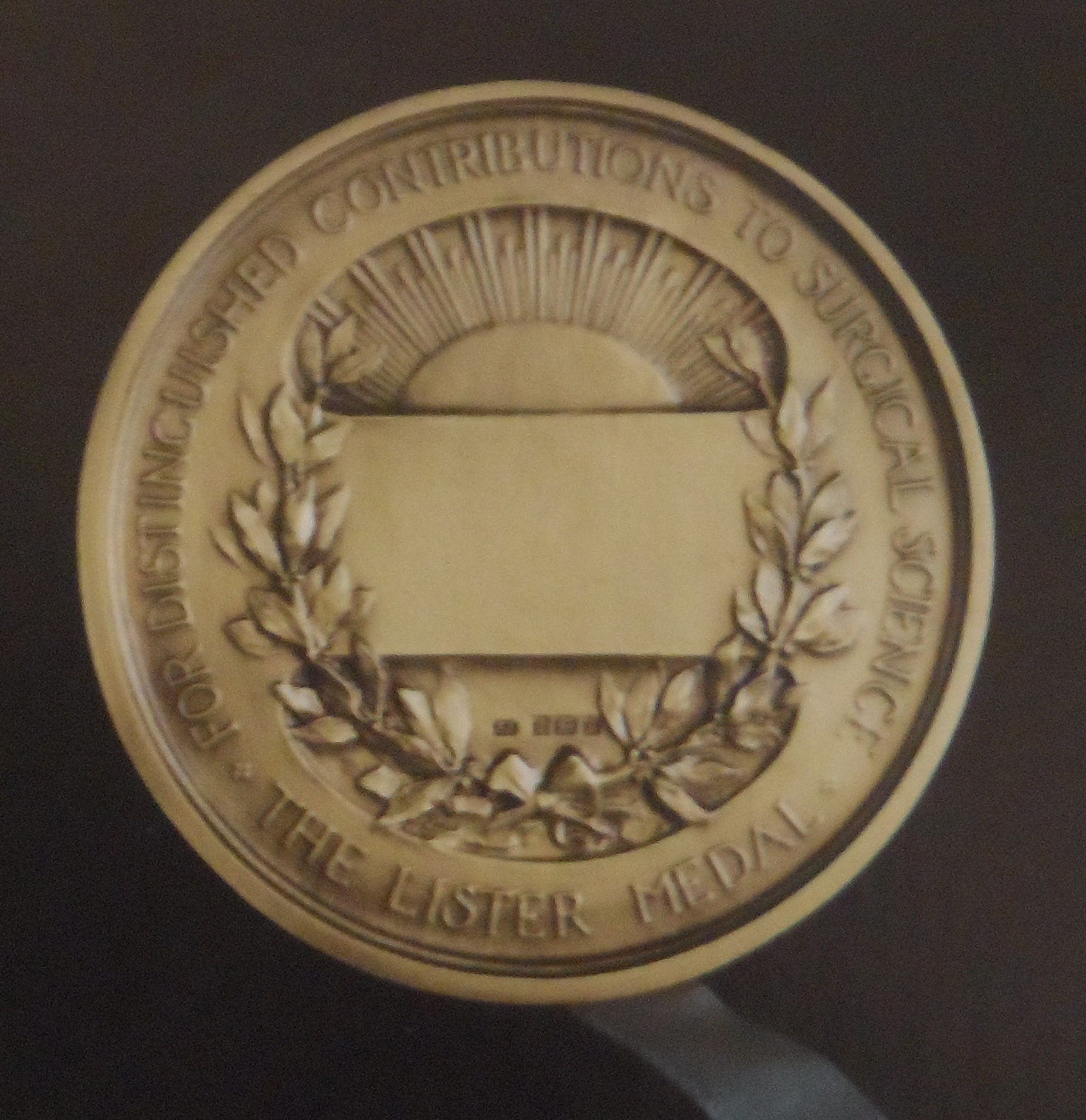
Reverse of the Lister Medal with the inscription

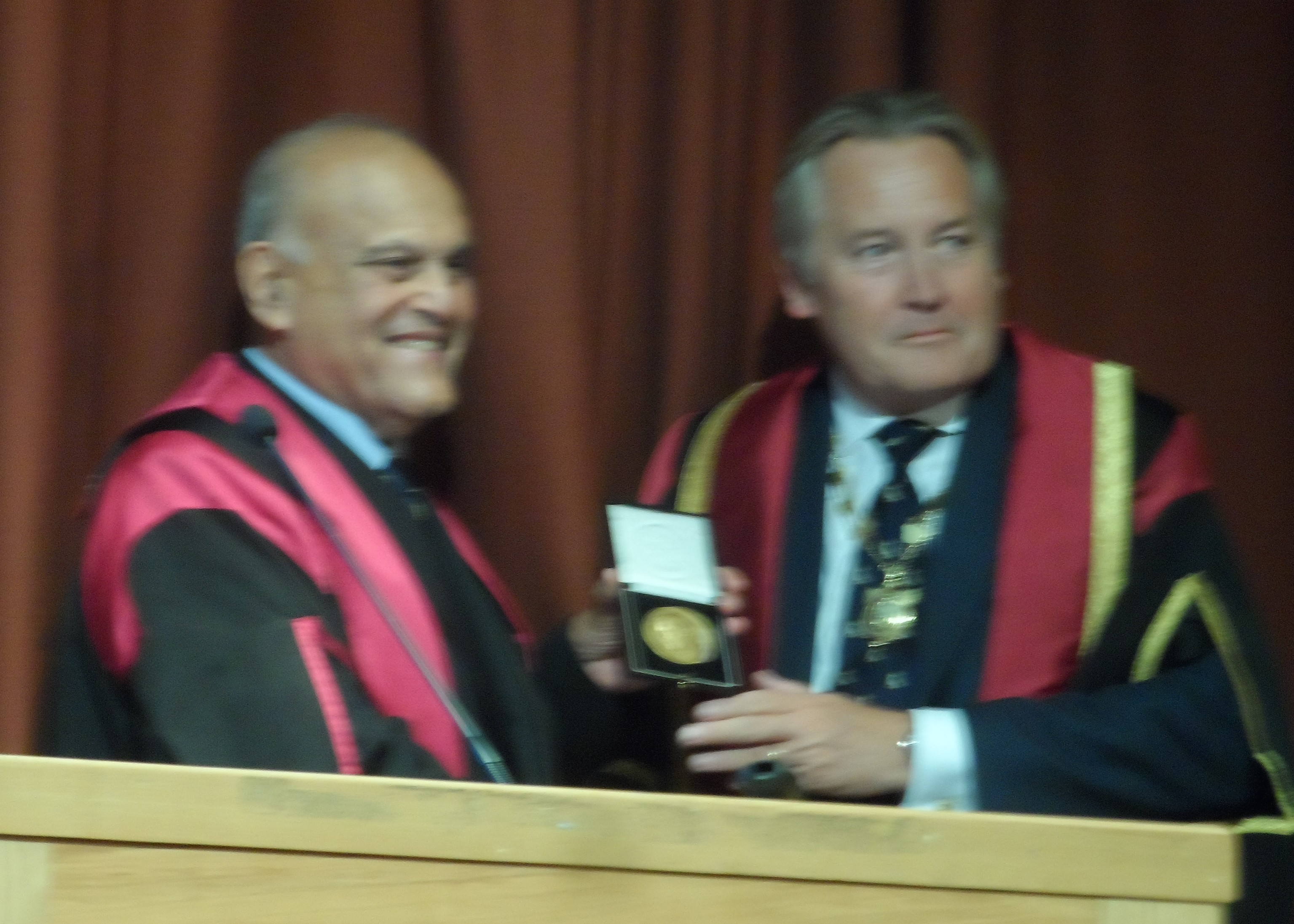
Magdi Yacoub (left) receiving the 2015 Lister Medal

== See also ==
- List of medicine awards
