= O. James Garden =

British surgeon and academic

O. James Garden CBE FRCS FRCP FRSE
- Born: Olivier James Garden; 13 November 1953 (age 72)
- Education: Lanark Grammar School; University of Edinburgh
- Occupations: Surgeon; Academic
- Known for: Scotland's first liver transplant Regius Professor of Clinical Surgery

Olivier James Garden (born 13 November 1953) is a British surgeon and academic. He held the Regius Chair of Clinical Surgery at the University of Edinburgh until 2018, and was president of the International Hepato-Pancreato-Biliary Association from 2012 to 2014. Garden performed Scotland's first liver transplant in Edinburgh in 1992 and founded the Scottish Liver Transplant Programme.

== Early life and education ==
Garden was born on 13 November 1953. He was educated at Lanark Grammar School, a secondary school in Lanark, Scotland. He graduated from the University of Edinburgh with a BSc in 1974. He studied medicine at the University of Edinburgh Medical School and graduated with a MBChB in 1977 and a MD in 1987. He completed his postgraduate surgical training in Edinburgh, Glasgow and Paris from 1978 to 1988.

== Career ==
Garden was appointed a senior lecturer in Surgery and Honorary Consultant Surgeon at the Royal Infirmary of Edinburgh in 1988. He was appointed Personal Chair in Hepatobiliary Surgery in 1997. He was appointed Regius Chair of Clinical Surgery in 2000. He was appointed Surgeon to the Queen in Scotland in 2004. He is a visiting professor at a number of institutions, including Harvard Medical School, Johns Hopkins School of Medicine, Washington University School of Medicine, Chinese University of Hong Kong and University of Cape Town. Garden founded the MSc in Surgical Sciences program at the University of Edinburgh. Garden is an editor of the textbook General Surgery: Principles and International Practice and Endocrine Surgery: Handbooks in General Surgery. Garden was the surgeon who provided 2 liver transplants to Jim Baxter.

== Honours ==
He was elected a Fellow of the Royal Society of Edinburgh in 2013. In the 2014 New Year Honours, Garden was appointed a Commander of the Order of the British Empire (CBE) for services to surgery.
