= Robert Muir (pathologist) =

Scottish physician and pathologist (1864–1959)

Sir Robert Muir FRS FRSE FRCP FRCPE FRFPSGlas
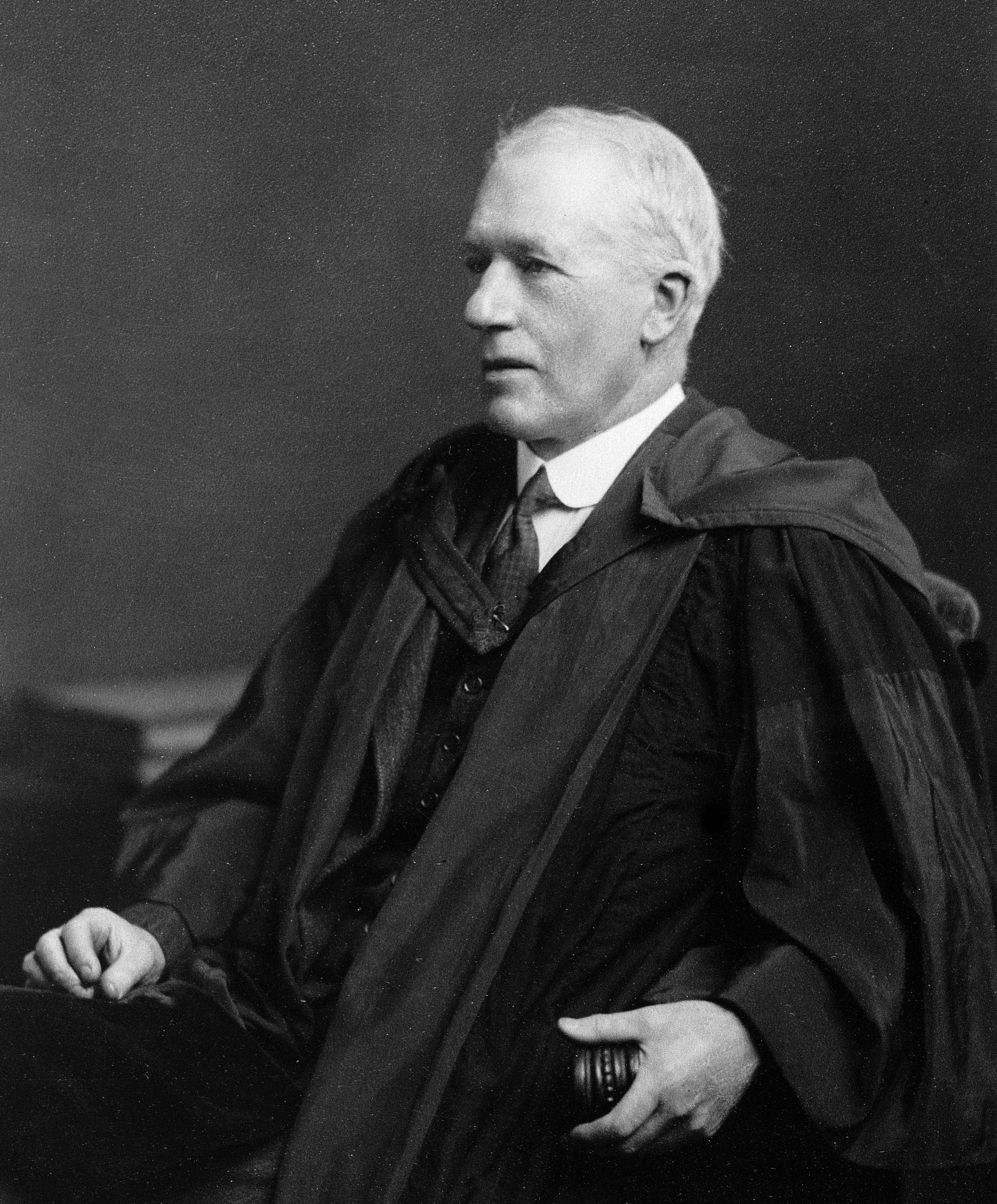
- Muir in 1932
- Born: 5 July 1864; Balfron, Stirlingshire, Scotland
- Died: 30 March 1959 (aged 94); Edinburgh, Scotland
- Education: University of Edinburgh (MA, MB CM, MD)
- Occupations: Physician; pathologist
- Years active: 1888–1936
- Awards: Royal Medal (1929); Lister Medal (1936)
- Military career
- Allegiance: United Kingdom
- Branch: British Army
- Rank: Lieutenant colonel
- Unit: Royal Army Medical Corps
- Conflicts: World War I

Sir Robert Muir (5 July 1864 – 30 March 1959) was a Scottish physician and pathologist who carried out pioneering work in immunology, and was one of the leading figures in medical research in Glasgow in the early 20th century.

== Early life ==
He was born in Balfron, Stirlingshire on 5 July 1864, the son of Rev Robert Muir, a United Presbyterian minister (who died when Muir was 18), and his wife, Susan Cameron Duncan. Soon after Muir's birth the family moved to Hawick.

Robert was educated at Hawick High School and Teviot Grove Academy. He then studied at the University of Edinburgh, where he obtained an MA degree in 1884 and qualified as a medical practitioner by receiving an MB CM degree with first-class honours in 1888. After two years of research he obtained his MD degree with honours and gold medal in 1890.

== Career ==
He became a Member of the Royal College of Physicians of Edinburgh in 1894 and proceeded to the Fellowship in 1895. Muir was a lecturer in bacterial pathology at Edinburgh University (1894–98), and was the first professor of pathology at St Andrews University (Dundee) (1898–99). He spent most of his career as professor of pathology at Glasgow University (1899–1936), where he became recognised as one of the world's leading authorities in pathology, especially blood cell disorders and breast cancer. During the period 1909 to 1911 he was assisted by John William McNee.

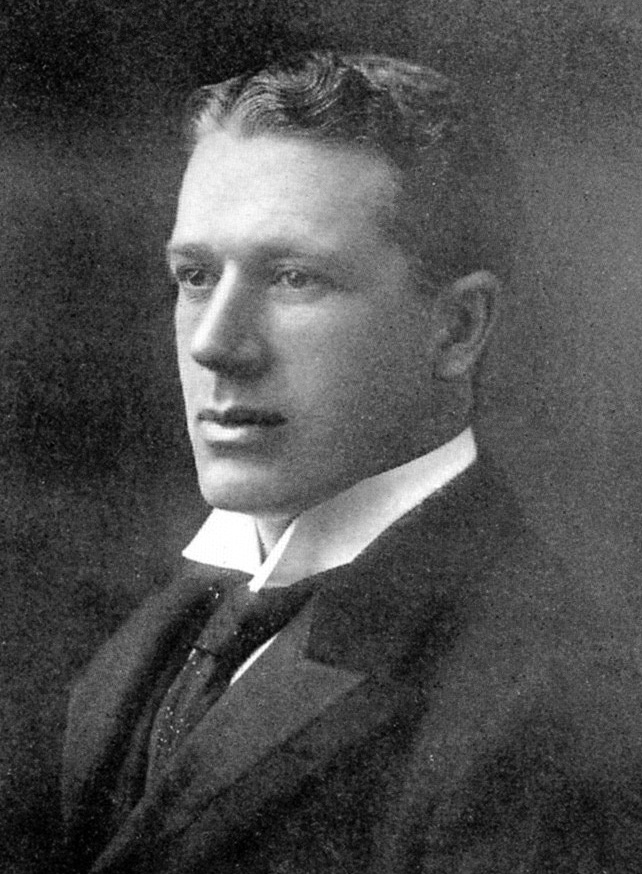
Muir, c. 1900

On 21 June 1933, in Saint John, New Brunswick, Muir gave a talk at the 64th Annual Meeting of the Canadian Medical Association. He was made LLD (Doctor of Laws) in 1937, and then served as Dean of Faculties from 1946 to 1949. In Glasgow he lived at 16 Victoria Crescent in the Dowanhill district.

Muir was elected a fellow of the Royal Society in 1911, and of the Royal Society of Edinburgh in 1916. His proposers were William Smith Greenfield, Cargill Gilston Knott, Arthur Robinson and James Hartley Ashworth. He served as the Society's vice president from 1950 to 1953.

He was a member of the Royal Society of Medicine and of the Pathological Society. He was awarded the Royal Society's Royal Medal in 1929 ("For his contributions to the science of immunology").

He received many honorary degrees, including the D.Sc. in 1934. He was awarded the Lister Medal in 1936 for his contributions to surgical science.

The corresponding Lister Memorial Lecture, titled Malignancy with illustrations from the pathology of the mamma, was published later that year. In later life, he served in several positions in the Royal Society of Edinburgh. He was on the council from 1944 to 1947, and was vice-president from 1950 to 1953.

In the First World War he served as a Lieutenant Colonel in the Royal Army Medical Corps, overseeing pathological and bacteriological work at Scottish hospitals. He was also inspector of laboratories in Scotland. Muir was knighted in 1934.

== Later life and death ==
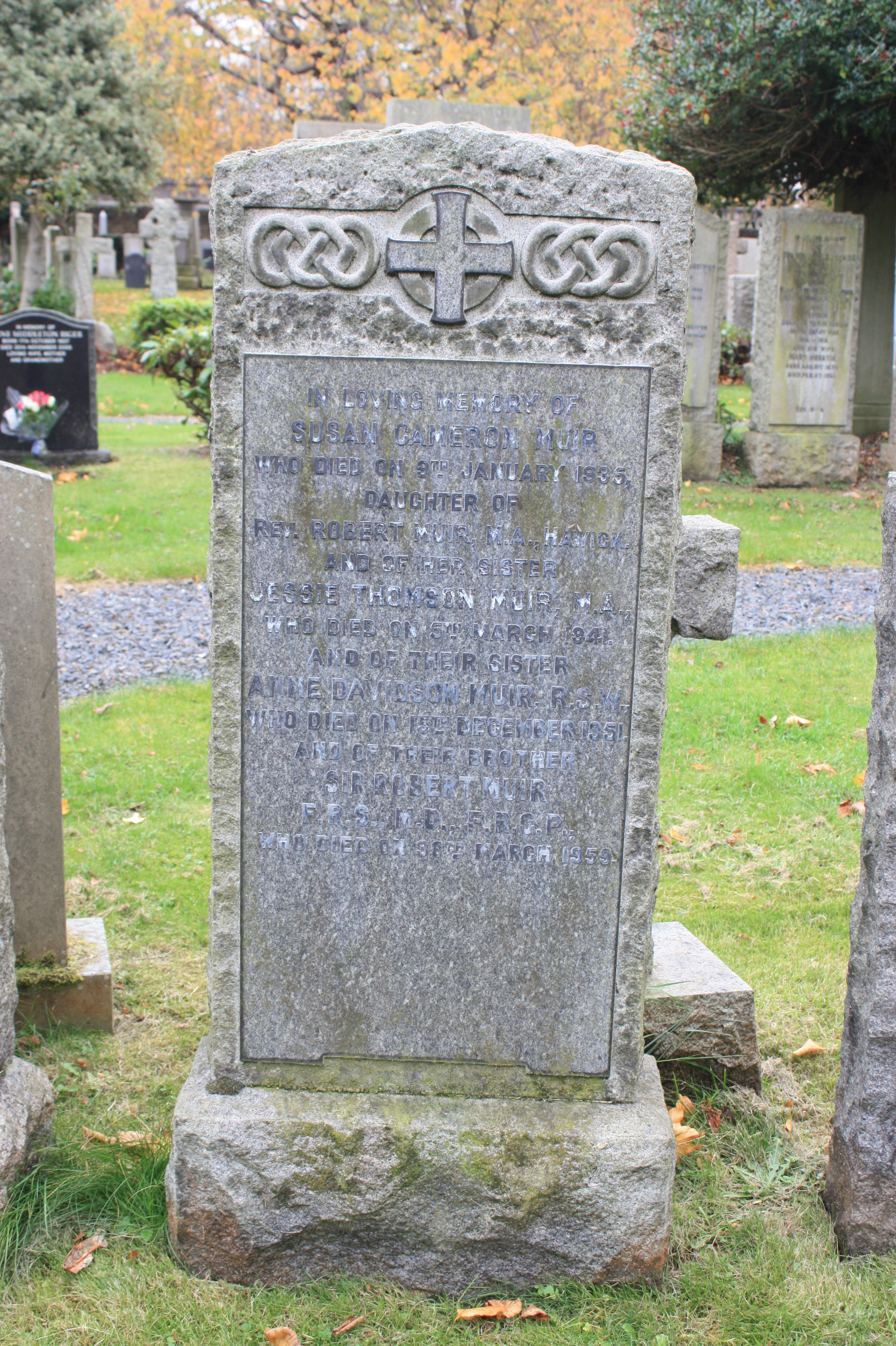
The grave of Sir Robert Muir, Dean Cemetery, Edinburgh

He retired in 1936 and died in 1959, at the age of 94. He never married and had no children. He is buried with his sister, artist Anne Davidson Muir, in the northern 20th-century extension to Dean Cemetery in western Edinburgh.

== Publications ==
His publications included a Manual of Bacteriology (1897) in collaboration with James Ritchie, an early collection of papers on immunology, Studies in Immunity (1909, London, Oxford University Press), followed by Text-book of Pathology (1924). The latter, originally published by Edward Arnold, became a standard textbook in the field of pathology, and by 2008, under the imprint of Hodder Arnold Publication, it had reached a 14th edition, known as Muir's Textbook of Pathology.

== Sources ==
- Royal Society of Edinburgh Biographical Index of Former Fellows – Part Two (accessed 14 October 2008)
- Entry for Muir in the Royal Society's Library and Archive catalogue's details of Fellows (accessed 14 October 2008)
- Biography of Muir from the University of Glasgow – includes a picture of Muir – (accessed 14 October 2008)
- Review of 1st edition of Text-book of Pathology, Br Med J. 1925 April 25; 1(3356): 787–790 (accessed 14 October 2008)
- Synopsis of 14th edition of Muir's Textbook of Pathology (accessed 14 October 2008)
- https://royalsocietypublishing.org/doi/pdf/10.1098/rsbm.1960.0013
