= Morell Mackenzie =

British doctor (1837–1892)

Sir Morell Mackenzie
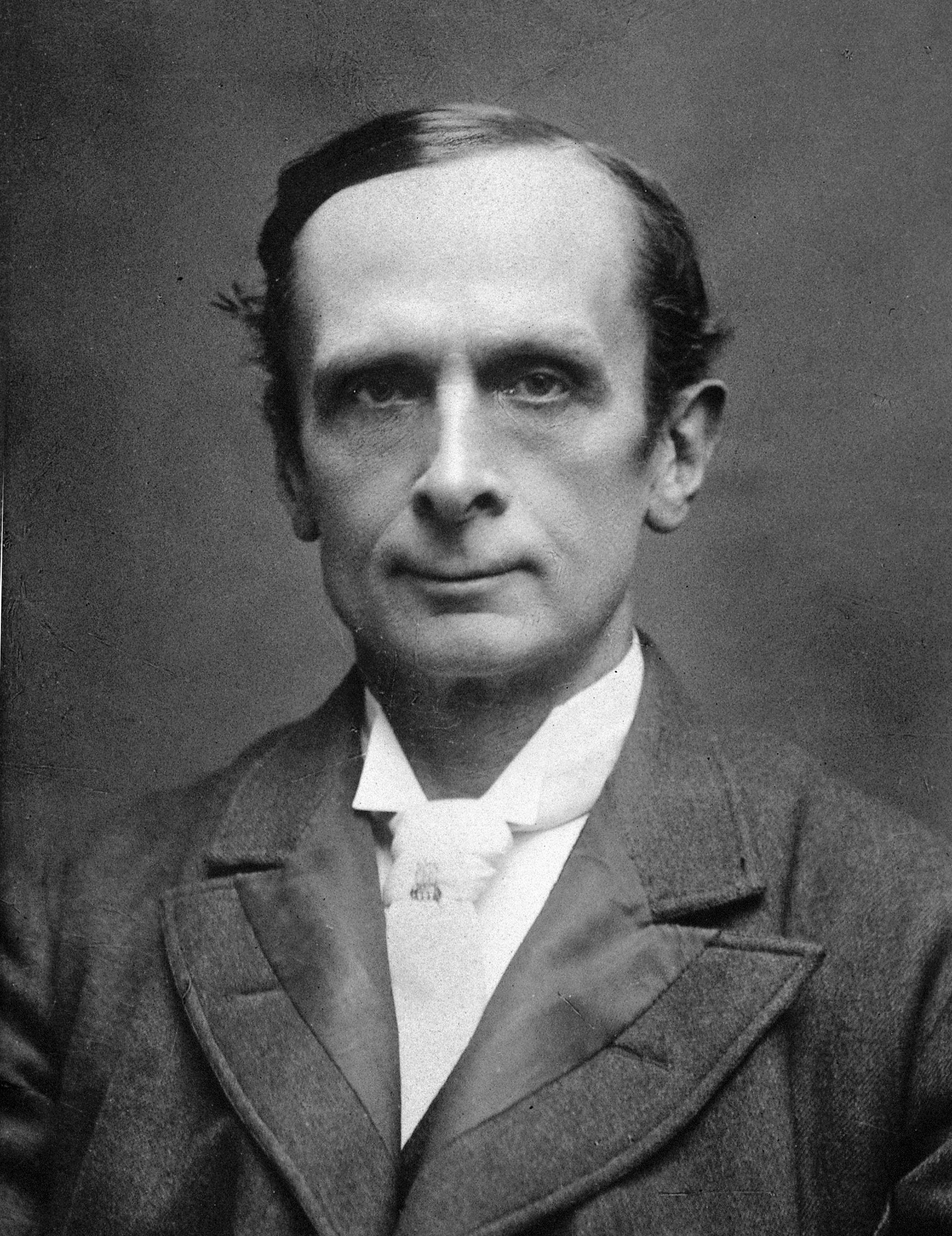
- Morell Mackenzie
- Born: 7 July 1837; Leytonstone, Essex, England
- Died: 3 February 1892 (aged 54); London, England
- Known for: laryngology
- Scientific career
- Fields: Physician

Sir Morell Mackenzie (7 July 1837 – 3 February 1892) was a British physician, one of the pioneers of laryngology in the United Kingdom.

== Biography ==
Morell Mackenzie was born at Leytonstone, Essex, England on 7 July 1837. He was the eldest of nine children of Stephen Mackenzie (1803–1851), a general practitioner and surgeon, and Margaret Frances (died 1877), daughter of wine merchant Adam Harvey, of Lewes, East Sussex. He was educated at Dr Greig's school in Walthamstow and at King's College London.

After going through the medical course at the London Hospital and becoming a member to the Royal College of Surgeons in 1858, he studied abroad in Paris, Vienna and Budapest where he learned the use of the newly invented laryngoscope under Johann Czermak.

Returning to London in 1862, he worked at the London Hospital and earned his degree in medicine. In 1863 he won the Jacksonian prize at the Royal College of Surgeons for an essay on the Pathology and Treatment of Diseases of the Larynx: The Diagnostic Indications to include the Appearance as Seen in the Living Person. He was the first to use the terms abductors and adductors to describe the muscles that govern the opening and closing of the glottis. He then devoted himself to becoming a specialist in diseases of the throat.

In 1863 the Hospital for Diseases of the Throat in King Street, Golden Square, was founded, largely owing to his initiative, and by his work there and at the London Hospital (where he was one of the physicians from 1866 to 1873) Morell Mackenzie rapidly became recognized throughout Europe as a leading authority, and acquired an extensive practice. A plaque at 32 Golden Square, unveiled in May 1995, commemorates the original hospital.

His reputation grew even more with the publication of three important books, which became the founding stones of the new specialty of laryngology:

- The Use of the Laryngoscope in Diseases of the Throat (1865).
- Growths in the Larynx (1871).
- Diseases of the Nose and Throat (1880 and 1884).

In 1887 Mackenzie was one of the founders of the Journal of Laryngology and Rhinology and of the British Rhino-Laryngological Association.

So great was his reputation that in May 1887, when the crown prince of Germany (afterwards the Emperor Frederick III) was attacked by the affection of the throat of which he ultimately died, Morell Mackenzie was specially summoned to attend him. The German physicians who had attended the prince since the beginning of March (Karl Gerhardt, and subsequently Adalbert Tobold, Ernst von Bergmann, and others), had diagnosed his ailment on 18 May as cancer of the throat; but Morell Mackenzie insisted (basing his opinion on a microscopical examination by a great pathologist, Rudolf Virchow, of a portion of the tissue) that the disease was not demonstrably cancerous, that an operation for the extirpation of the larynx (planned for the 21 May) was unjustifiable, and that the growth might well be a benign one and therefore curable by other treatment.

The question was one not only of personal but of political importance, since it was unsure whether any one suffering from an incapacitating disease like cancer could, according to the family law of the Hohenzollerns, occupy the German throne, and there was talk of a renunciation of the succession by the crown prince. It was freely hinted, moreover, that some of the doctors themselves were influenced by political considerations. At any rate, Morell Mackenzie's opinion was followed: the crown prince went to England, under his treatment, and was present at the celebrations of the Golden Jubilee of Queen Victoria in June. Morell Mackenzie was knighted in September 1887 for his services, and appointed a Grand Commander of the Royal House Order of Hohenzollern.

In November, however, the German doctors were again called into consultation, and it was ultimately admitted that the disease really was cancer; but Mackenzie, with very questionable judgment, more than hinted that it had become malignant since his first examination, in consequence of the irritating effect of the treatment by the German doctors. The crown prince became emperor on 9 March 1888 and died on 15 June. During all this period, a violent quarrel raged between Mackenzie and the German medical world. The German doctors published an account of the illness, to which Mackenzie replied by a work entitled The Fatal Illness of Frederick the Noble (1888), the publication of which caused him to be censured by the Royal College of Surgeons.

After this sensational episode in his career, the remainder of Mackenzie's life was uneventful. He died, somewhat suddenly, in London, on 3 February 1892 and was buried in the churchyard at Wargrave in Berkshire where he had a house. He published several books on laryngoscopy and diseases of the throat.

Biographies of Mackenzie were published by H. R. Haweis (1893) and R. Scott Stevenson (1946).

== Writings ==
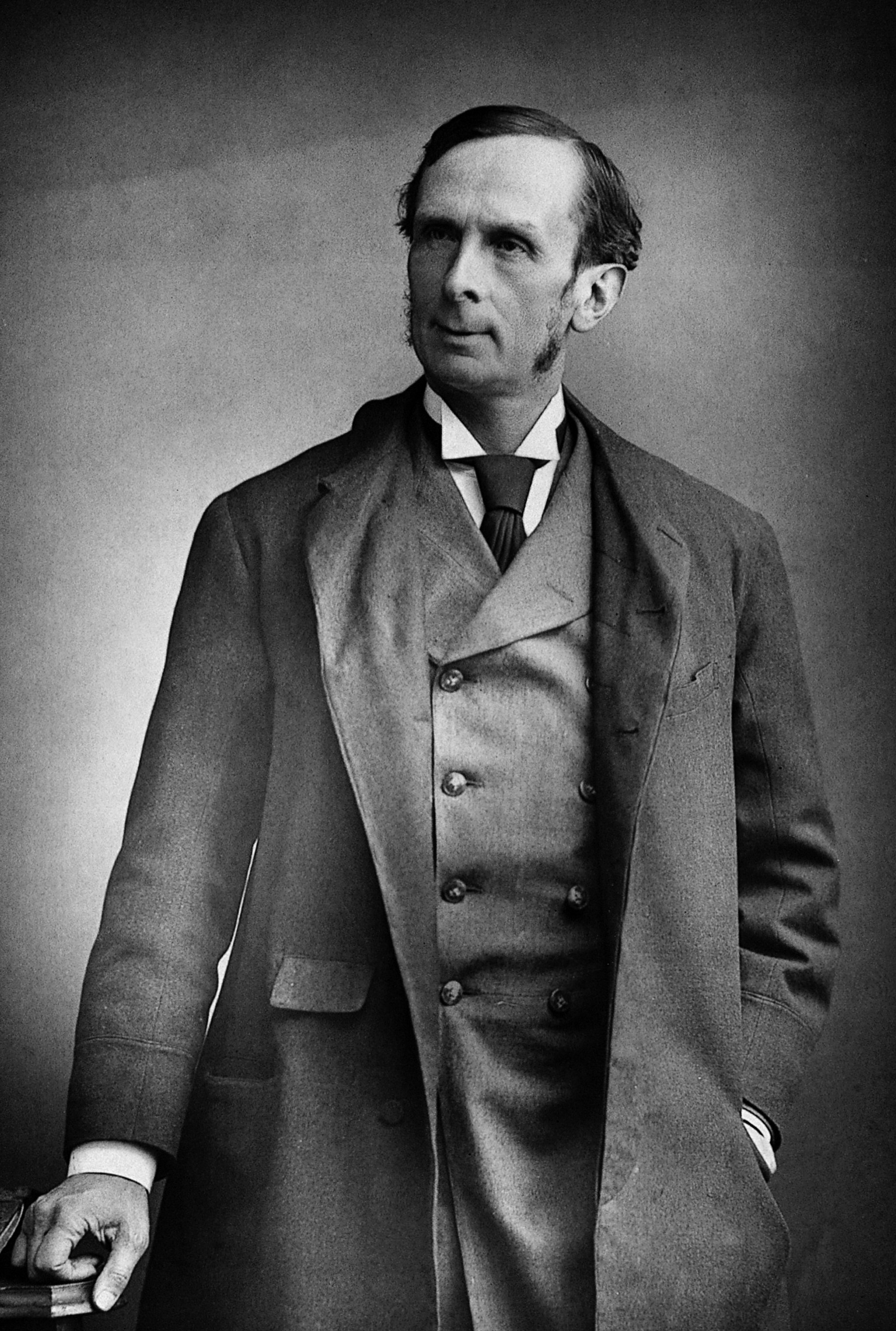
Morell Mackenzie

- The Use of the Laryngoscope in Diseases of the Throat. Philadelphia: Lindsay & Blakiston, 1865.
- Hoarseness, Loss of Voice, and Stridulous Breathing in Relation to Nervo-Muscular Affectations of the Larynx. London: Churchill, 1868.
- Essays on Growths in the Larynx. Philadelphia: Lindsay & Blakiston, 1871.
- The Pharmacopoeia of the Hospital for Diseases of the Throat. London: Churchill, 1872.
- Diphtheria: Its Nature and Treatment, Varieties and Local Expressions. Philadelphia: Lindsay & Blakiston, 1879.
- Diseases of the Pharynx, Larynx, and Trachea. New York: W. Wood, 1880.
- A Manual of the Diseases of the Nose and Throat. London: Churchill, 1880–1884.
- The Pharmacopoeia of the Hospital for Diseases of the Throat and Chest : based on the British Pharmacopoeia . Churchill, London 4th Ed. 1881 Digital edition by the University and State Library Düsseldorf
- The Hygiene of the Vocal Organs: A Practical Handbook for Singers and Speakers. London: Macmillan, 1886.
- Hay Fever and Paroxysmal Sneezing: Their Etiology and Treatment. London: Churchill, 1887.
- The Fatal Illness of Frederick the Noble. London: Low, Marston, Searle, 1888.
- Essays. London: Sampson Low, Marston, 1893. Digital edition available through the HathiTrust Digital Library (original from Harvard University).

== See also ==
- Fall of Eagles; he is portrayed in the 3rd episode under the name "Mackenzie."
