= Johann Nepomuk Czermak =

Austrian-German physiologist

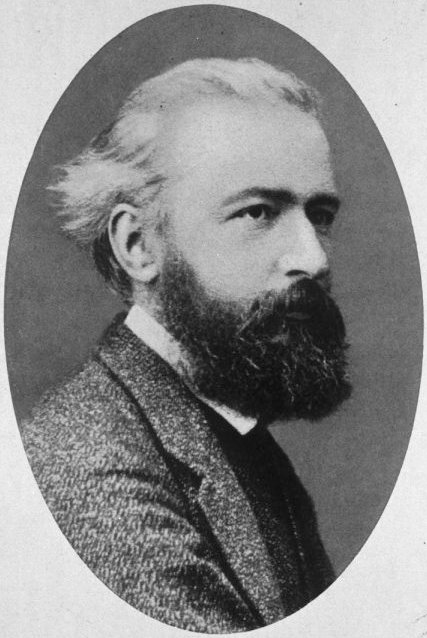
Johann Nepomuk Czermak

Johann Nepomuk Czermak (17 June 1828 – 16 September 1873) was an Austrian-German physiologist.

== Biography ==
Czermak was born on 17 June 1828 in Prague. He studied in Prague, Vienna, Breslau and Würzburg. At Breslau he was greatly influenced by the work of physiologist Jan Evangelista Purkyně (1787–1869). He became a professor at Graz in 1855, and proceeded to work at several European universities, including Kraków (1856/57) and Leipzig (from 1869). Czermak was a member of the Austrian Academy of Sciences. Just prior to his death in 1873, he founded a physiological institute in Leipzig called the "Spectatorium". He died on 16 September 1873 in Leipzig.

== Contributions ==
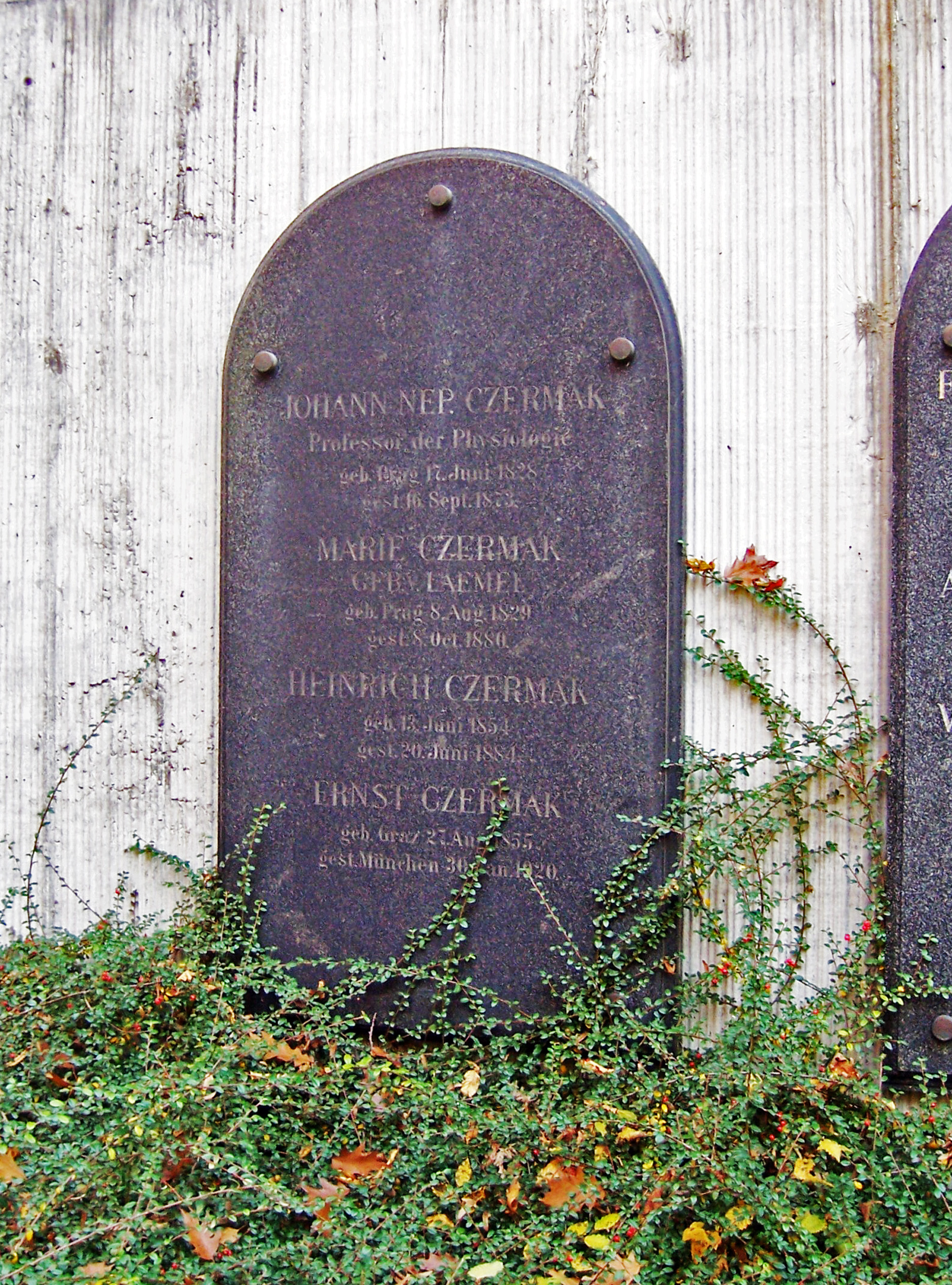
Grave plate of Czermak in Leipzig

Czermak is remembered for his contributions made in the field of laryngology. Along with neurologist Ludwig Türck (1810–1868), he is credited for introducing the laryngoscope into medicine. The laryngoscope was created by Spanish singing instructor Manuel Garcia (1805–1906) in 1854 — shortly afterwards, Czermak made modifications to the device, and it soon gained popularity in the medical world. Czermak is also credited for adapting the instrument for examination of the nose and nasopharynx.

He had a keen interest in phonetics, performing extensive studies on the role of the voice and acoustic conditions of the throat, mouth and nasal cavities in the production of consonants.

His name is associated with "Czermak's vagus pressure", described as mechanical pressure being applied to a location on the carotid triangle that causes a lowering of the heart rate and eventual loss of consciousness. He conducted research on spatial localisation of skin sensibility, and also demonstrated the influence of the nervus sympathicus in regards to excretion of saliva. In addition, he made contributions towards understanding a disorder that would later be known as Von Hippel–Lindau disease — showing that changes in the eyes' fundus was capillary angioma of the retina. For a period of time, the term "Hippel–Czermak syndrome" was used to reference the condition.

== Selected writings ==
- Physiologische Studien, three parts, Wien 1854/55 ("Physiological Studies").
- Über das Verhalten des weichen Gaumens beim Hervorbringen der reinen Vocale, Wien 1857 ("On the behavior of the soft palate at producing the pure vowels").
- Der Kehlkopfspiegel und seine Verwerthung für Physiologie und Medizin. Eine Monographie, Leipzig 1860 ("The laryngoscope and its usage for physiology and medicine. A monograph").
- Populäre Physiologische Vorträge. Wien 1869 ("Popular Physiological Lectures")
- Gesammelte Schriften, two volumes, Leipzig 1879 ("Collected Writings").
