= Leopold von Schrötter =

Austrian physician

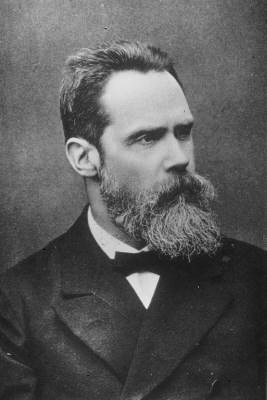
- Leopold Schrötter von Kristelli (1837–1908)
- Born: February 5, 1837; Graz
- Died: April 22, 1908 (aged 71); Vienna
- Education: University of Vienna
- Scientific career
- Fields: Medicine

Leopold Schrötter Ritter von Kristelli, (name often given as Leopold von Schrötter in medical literature) (February 5, 1837 – April 22, 1908) was an Austrian internist and laryngologist born in Graz. He was the son of chemist Anton Schrötter von Kristelli, and father to physician Hermann Schroetter-Kristelli (1870–1928).

Leopold Schrötter Ritter von Kristelli studied at the Akademisches Gymnasium in Graz, Austria. In 1861 he received his medical doctorate from the University of Vienna, and following graduation remained in Vienna as an apprentice-surgeon to Franz Schuh (1804–1865). From 1863 to 1869, he was an assistant to Josef Škoda (1805–1881), receiving his habilitation in 1867.

Following the death of Ludwig Türck (1810–1868), he attained the first chair of laryngology at Vienna, and three years later, became director of the world's first laryngological clinic at Vienna General Hospital (Allgemeines Krankenhaus). In 1875, he became an associate professor of laryngology, and from 1875 to 1881, he was head of the department of internal medicine. In 1881 he was appointed Primararzt (primary physician) at the General Hospital, and in 1890 was named professor and director of the third medical clinic in Vienna.

In addition to his expertise in the field of laryngology, Schrötter is remembered for his work involving diseases of the heart and lungs. He was a driving force in construction of the Alland Lungenheilanstalt (lung clinic), an institution that began attending to patients in 1898. With British surgeon James Paget (1814–1899), the eponymous Paget-Schrötter disease is named. This disorder involves primary thrombosis of the axillary vein or subclavian vein.

Maria Konopnicka, a famous Polish writer and poet, was treated there.

== Selected publications ==
Among his written works is a treatise on heart diseases that was included in Hugo Wilhelm von Ziemssen's Handbuch der speciellen Pathologie und Therapie. Other noted works by Schrötter include:

- Beitrag zur Behandlung der Larynx-Stenosen (Contribution to the treatment of laryngeal stenosis), 1876.
- Beitrag zur localen Anaesthesie des Larynx (On local anesthesia of the larynx), 1881.
- Über die Lungentuberkulose und die Mittel zu ihrer Heilung (About pulmonary tuberculosis and the means to cure), 1891.
- Hygiene der Lunge im gesunden und kranken Zustand (Hygiene of the lung in healthy and diseased states), 1903.
- Über Hotelbau vom hygienischen Standpunkte (On hotel construction from a hygienic standpoint), 1906.
