= Francis Daniels Moore =

American surgeon

- Born: April 17, 1913; Evanston, Illinois, U.S.
- Died: November 24, 2001 (aged 88); Westwood, Massachusetts
- Education: Harvard University (B.A.), (M.D.)
- Awards: Lister Medal (1978)
- Scientific career
- Fields: Surgery
- Workplaces: Brigham and Women's Hospital, Harvard Medical School

Francis Daniels Moore (April 17, 1913, in Evanston, Illinois – November 24, 2001, in Westwood, Massachusetts) was an American surgeon who was a pioneer in numerous experimental surgical treatments. Among his many achievements, he refined burn-treatment techniques, helped perform the world's first successful organ transplant (which involved a kidney), and accurately determined the volume of water and other nutrients in the human body using radioactive isotopes of those substances.

In 1952, Moore became a member of the American Academy of Arts and Sciences. He was awarded the 1978 Lister Medal for his contributions to surgical science. The corresponding Lister Oration, given at the Royal College of Surgeons of England, was delivered on May 23, 1979, and was titled "Science and service". He later became a member of both the National Academy of Sciences and the American Philosophical Society.

Moore graduated from Harvard in 1935, where he was president of The Harvard Lampoon magazine and the Hasty Pudding Club. In 1939, he received his medical degree from Harvard Medical School.
