= Laryngology =

Medical specialty that deals with the larynx

Laryngology is a branch of medicine that deals with disorders, diseases and injuries of the larynx, colloquially known as the voice box. Laryngologists treat disorders of the larynx, including diseases that affects the voice, swallowing, or upper airway. Common conditions addressed by laryngologists include vocal fold nodules and cysts, laryngeal cancer, spasmodic dysphonia, laryngopharyngeal reflux, papillomas, and voice misuse/abuse/overuse syndromes. Dysphonia/hoarseness; laryngitis (including Reinke's edema, Vocal cord nodules and polyps); *Spasmodic dysphonia; dysphagia; Tracheostomy; Cancer of the larynx; and vocology (the science and practice of voice habilitation) are included in laryngology.

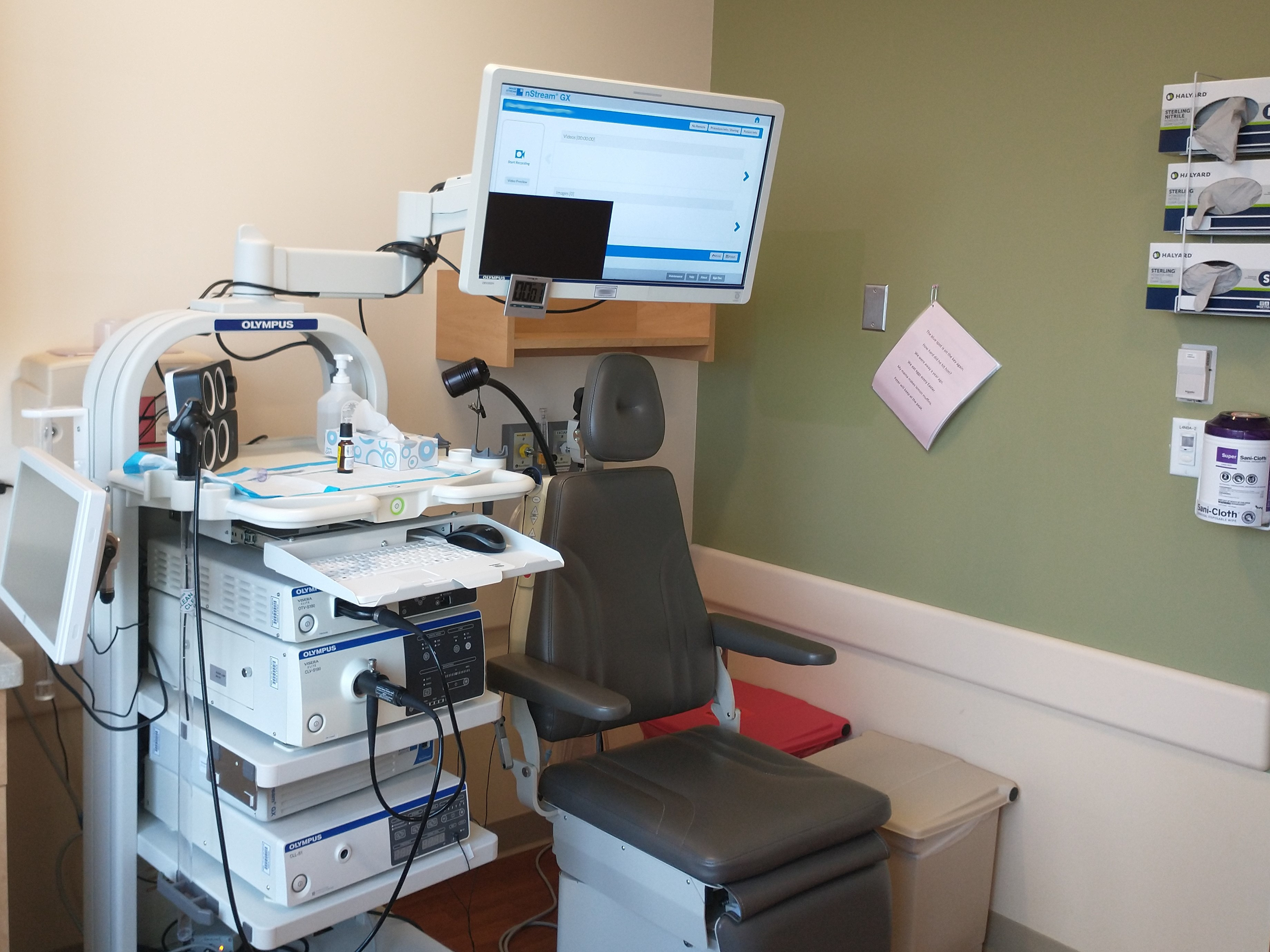
A laryngology exam and procedure room.

== Etymology of "laryngology" ==
The word "laryngology" is derived from:

- the Greek prefix λαρυγγ- (laryng-, root = λάρυγξ, meaning "larynx"), and
- the Greek suffix -λογία (-logy, root = λόγος, meaning "the study of", or "knowledge").

== Famous laryngologists ==
- Paul Gerber (1863–1919), who published poetry under the pseudonym Heinrich Garibert
- George Duncan Gibb (1821–1876)
- Morell Mackenzie (1837–1892)
- Felix Semon (1849–1921)
- St Clair Thomson (1857–1943)
- Chevalier Jackson (1865–1958)
- Victor Negus (1887–1974)
- Georges Portmann (1890–1985)
- Sir John Milsom Rees (1866–1952)
- Oliver St John Gogarty

== See also ==
- Otolaryngology
- Pasqual Mario Marafioti
