= Glacier (disambiguation) =

A glacier is a geological formation of ice.

Glacier may also refer to:

== Places ==
=== Canada ===
- Glacier, British Columbia, a railway whistlestop and locality in the Rogers Pass, British Columbia
- Glacier National Park (Canada), British Columbia
- Glacier Pass, a pass on Ellesmere Island, Nunavut
- Glacier Peak (Canadian Rockies), a mountain on the Alberta-British Columbia border in Kootenay National Park
- Glacier Pikes, a volcano in British Columbia

=== United States ===
- Glacier, Washington, a census-designated place in Whatcom County, Washington
- Glacier Bay, southeastern Alaska
- Glacier County, Montana, northwestern Montana, adjacent to the US-Canada border
- Glacier National Park (U.S.), Montana
- Glacier Peak, a mountain in the North Cascades of Washington
- Glacier View, Alaska, a census-designated place in the Matanuska-Susitna Borough

=== Elsewhere ===
- Gletscherland (Glacier Land), Greenland

== Arts, entertainment and media ==
=== Music ===
- Glacier (band), a Japanese rock band
- Glaciers (album), a 2013 album by Blue Sky Black Death
- "Glacier", a song by John Grant from the 2013 album Pale Green Ghosts
- "GLACEIR"^{[sic]}, a song by Toby Fox from the 2025 album Deltarune Chapters 3+4 OST

=== Other ===
- "Glacial" (short story)
- The Glacier, student newspaper of Moraine Valley Community College
- Glacier (dance work), a 2013 contemporary dance work by New York choreographer Liz Gerring
- Glacier (game engine), game engine by Danish video game developer IO Interactive
- Glacier (wrestler) (born 1964), name Ray Lloyd, American martial artist, professional wrestler, and actor

== Science and technology ==
- GLACIER (refrigerator), an ultra-cold freezer used on the International Space Station
- Amazon Glacier, a cloud archiving service

== Other uses ==
- Fox's Glacier Mints, a British brand of mint-flavoured sweets (candy; lollies)
- Central Mountain Air (airline call sign: GLACIER)
- USS Glacier, a former icebreaker of the US Navy and Coast Guard (AGB-4 and WAGB-4)

== See also ==
- Glacial period, an interval of time (thousands of years) within an ice age
- "GLACEIR", a 2025 track by Toby Fox from Deltarune Chapters 3+4 OST
- Glaisher, a surname
- Ice age (disambiguation)
- Iceberg (disambiguation)
- Glacia (disambiguation)
- List of glaciers
