= Glaisher =

Glaisher is a surname, and may refer to:

- Cecilia Glaisher (1828–1892), photographer and illustrator
- James Glaisher (1809–1903), English meteorologist and astronomer
- James Whitbread Lee Glaisher (1848–1928), English mathematician and astronomer

== See also ==
- Glaisher (crater), a crater on the Moon, named for James Glaisher (1809–1903)
- Glacier (disambiguation)
