= Tom Harper (director) =

British film director

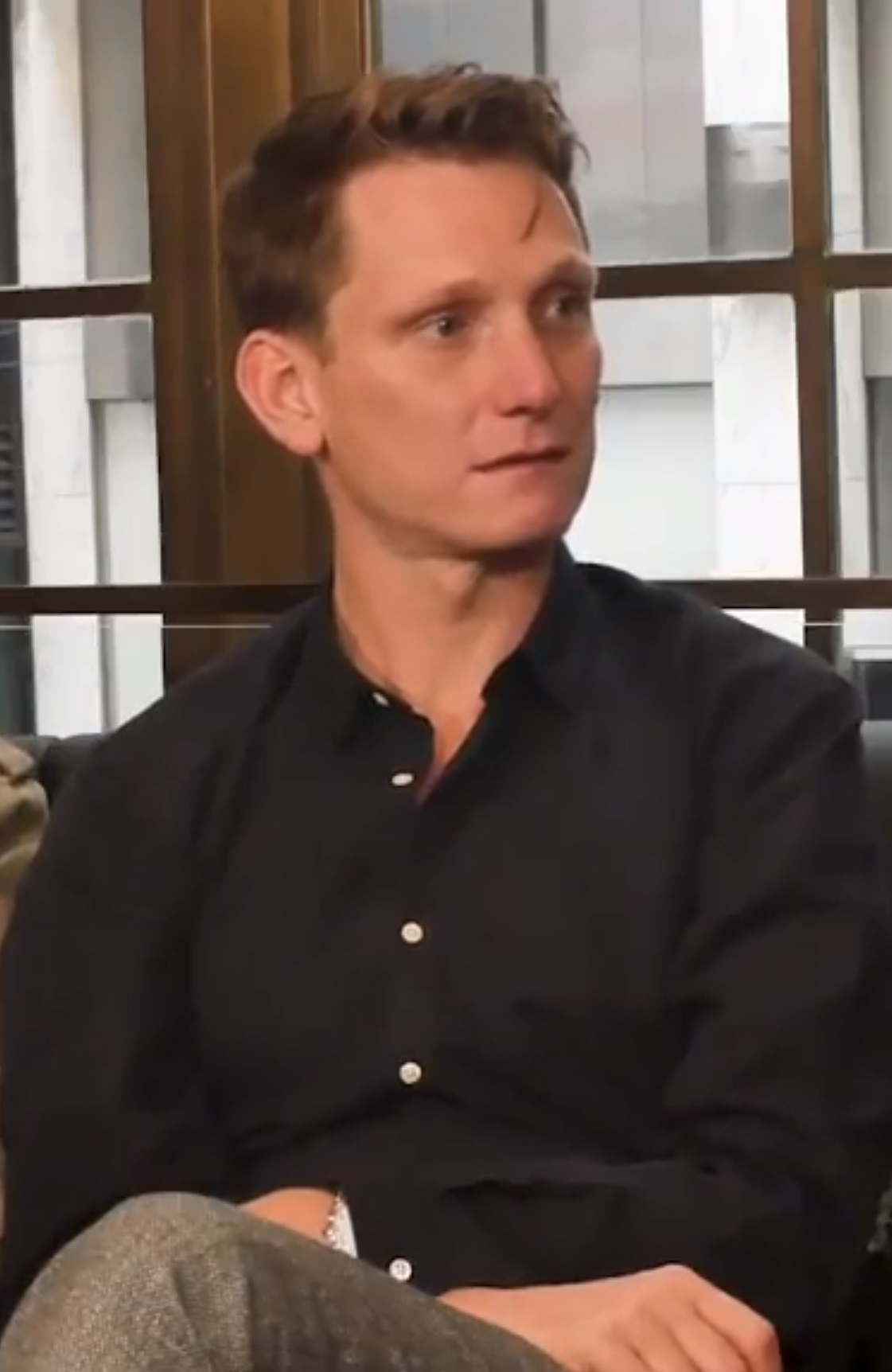
- Tom Harper, interviewed in 2018
- Born: England
- Education: The University of Manchester
- Occupations: Film director; film producer; screenwriter; film editor; cinematographer
- Years active: 1998–present

Tom Harper is a British film and television director, producer and writer. He is best known for his work on The Aeronauts, Wild Rose, Peaky Blinders, and the BBC TV mini-series War & Peace.

== Early life and education ==
Harper grew up in a Quaker family. He "credits Quakerism with setting the tone in his attitudes towards pacifism and non-violence."

Harper attended Acland Burghley School before going on to study at The University of Manchester.

== Career ==
Harper began his career making short films. He wrote and directed Cubs in 2006 about urban fox hunting which was nominated for a BAFTA in the Best Short Film category and won a BIFA.

Harper then moved on to direct a range of film and television work which includes Misfits, The Scouting Book for Boys (2009), This Is England '86, The Borrowers (2011), Peaky Blinders (2013) and The Woman in Black: Angel of Death.

In 2014, Harper re-teamed with Jack Thorne, the writer of The Scouting Book for Boys, to make War Book, which premiered at the London Film Festival and had its international premiere as the opening film of the International Festival of Film Rotterdam. The film received critical acclaim with The List calling it a "powerful, provocative and essential piece of modern British cinema". Harper was also a producer on the film. He directed the 2016 BBC TV mini-series War & Peace, starring Paul Dano, Lily James and James Norton for BBC1 and The Weinstein Company. The series topped ratings and won rave reviews. The series was nominated for 6 BAFTAs (including Best Drama Series) and won for Best Production Design.

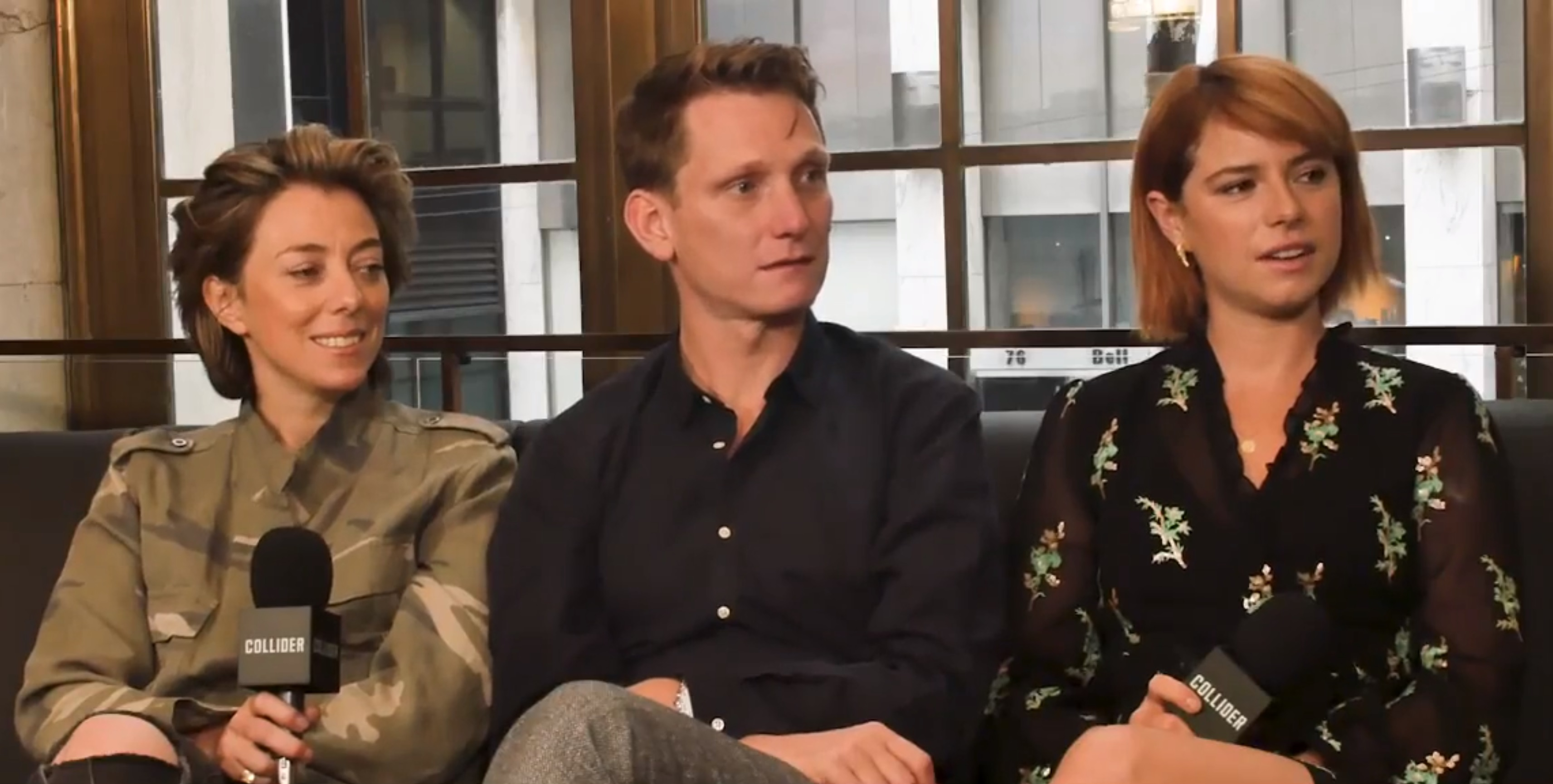
Jessie Buckley, Tom Harper, and Nicole Taylor interviewed about Wild Rose in 2018

Harper next directed the pilot episode of The Son for AMC based on Phillip Meyer's acclaimed novel. Pierce Brosnan played the lead, replacing Sam Neill (with whom Harper previously worked on Peaky Blinders) who was forced to pull out for "personal reasons." The series was picked up for a second season in May 2017.

In 2017, Harper teamed up with Jack Thorne again, to make "The Commuter," starring Timothy Spall, the third episode of the Channel 4/Amazon Video anthology series Philip K. Dick's Electric Dreams.

Wild Rose starring Jessie Buckley (with whom Harper had worked previously on War and Peace) and Julie Walters, and written by Nicole Taylor, was filmed in Glasgow, Scotland, and Nashville, USA, in the summer of 2017. Owen Gleiberman described it in Variety as "a happy-sad drama of starstruck fever that lifts you up and sweeps you along, touching you down in a puddle of well-earned tears."

The Aeronauts, based on James Glaisher and Henry Coxwell's famous 1862 flight, and starring Eddie Redmayne and Felicity Jones started its shoot in the summer of 2018. The script was written by Jack Thorne, their fifth collaboration, and Harper along with Todd Lieberman produced the film for Amazon Studios. Until March 2020, The Aeronauts was the most watched film of all time on Amazon Prime.

Harper directed a short film to launch The Royal Albert Hall's 150th anniversary year. Entitled Your Room Will Be Ready, the film was shot in 2020 during the Covid pandemic and is a tribute to live music. Narrated by Mick Jagger it features more than 40 archive event clips including never-before-seen and rare material dating back to 1930s.

Peaky Blinders: The Immortal Man, based on the TV series, and starring Cillian Murphy, Rebecca Ferguson, Barry Keoghan, Stephen Graham and Tim Roth was filmed at the end of 2024 and released on March 2026. Following the announcement of the last series of Peaky Blinders, Knight clarified that it had been decided to produce a feature-length movie in place of a seventh series.

== Filmography ==
Short film

Year	Title	Director	Writer
1998	Eyelines	Yes	No
2004	Beat	Yes	Yes
2006	Cubs	Yes	Yes
2007	Cherries	Yes	No
2011	The Swarm	Yes	Yes

=== Feature film ===
Year	Title	Director	Producer	Writer
2009	The Scouting Book for Boys	Yes	No	No
2014	War Book	Yes	Yes	No
2015	The Woman in Black: Angel of Death	Yes	No	No
2018	Wild Rose	Yes	No	No
2019	The Aeronauts	Yes	Yes	Story
2023	Heart of Stone	Yes	Executive	No
2026	Peaky Blinders: The Immortal Man	Yes	Executive	No

=== Television ===
Miniseries

Year	Title	Notes
2006	Squat Street	
2009	Demons	3 episodes
2010	This Is England '86	2 episodes
2015	War & Peace	

TV series

Year	Title	Notes
2007	Coming Up	Episode: "Spoil"
2009–2010	Misfits	4 episodes; also executive producer
2013	Peaky Blinders	3 episodes
2017	Philip K. Dick's Electric Dreams	Episode: "The Commuter"
2024	A Gentleman in Moscow	Executive producer

TV movies

- Dis/Connected (2008)
- The Borrowers (2011)
