= Leicester balloon riot =

1864 riot in Leicester, England

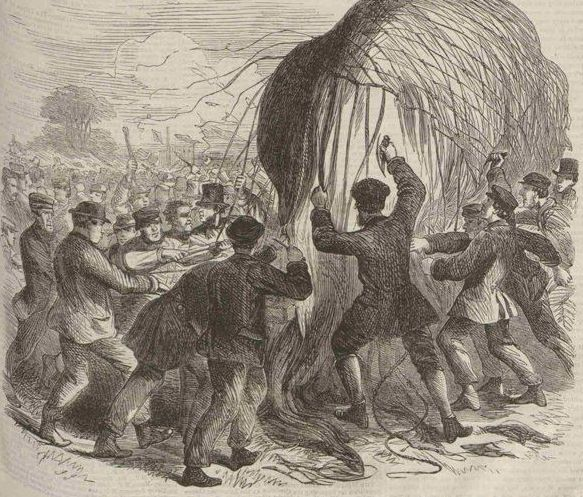
A contemporary depiction of the riot from the Penny Illustrated Paper

A riot occurred on 11 July 1864 in Victoria Park, Leicester, during a public demonstration of a new hydrogen balloon by the aeronaut Henry Tracey Coxwell. An estimated 50,000 spectators were present for the event.

Disorder broke out amid rumours that the balloon on display was neither the largest nor the newest in Coxwell's fleet, contrary to prior claims. Tensions escalated further following allegations that a woman in the crowd had been struck by a police officer. The balloon was damaged during the disturbance, prompting Coxwell to deliberately collapse the gas envelope before fleeing the scene under attack.

The balloon was subsequently destroyed by the crowd; the envelope was torn apart, and the basket was set alight. The incident resulted in significant financial loss for Coxwell, who was forced to construct a replacement. It also hindered progress in the field of scientific high-altitude ballooning.

== Background ==
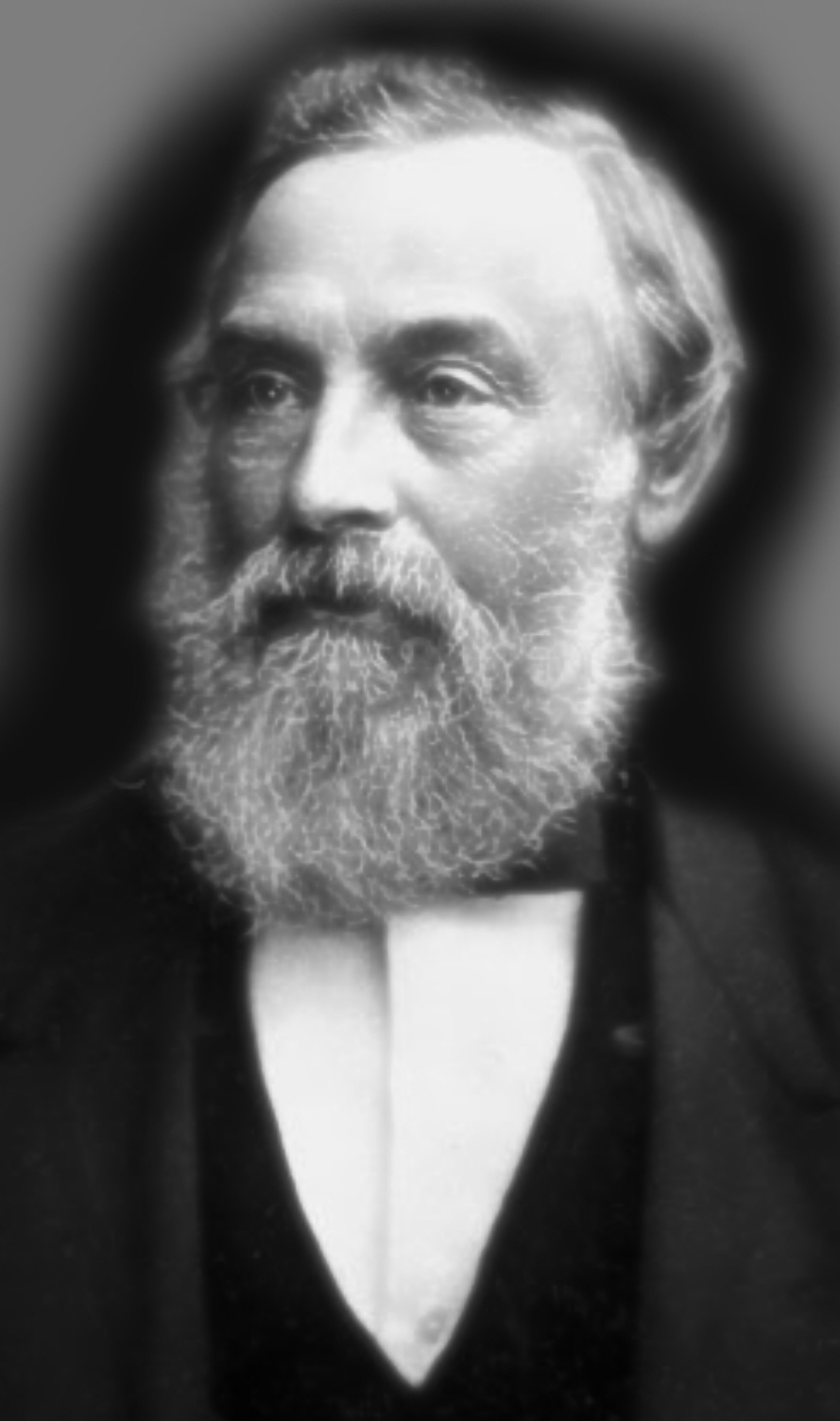
Henry Tracey Coxwell

Henry Tracey Coxwell was an English aeronaut of the mid- to late 19th century. He became famous for a 5 September 1862 flight with meteorologist James Glaisher. Setting off from Wolverhampton in the West Midlands in a balloon filled with coal gas they reached a record altitude of 37,000 ft (11,000 m). With low oxygen levels and temperatures below −20 °C (−4 °F) the pair almost died before Coxwell managed to release gas from a valve with his teeth (his hands being unusable) to lose height. The flight, which was funded by the British Association for the Advancement of Science (BA), provided valuable data about the Earth's atmosphere and Coxwell and Glaisher resolved to continue high-altitude flights.

Following the Wolverhampton flight and a subsequent flight on 29 September, Coxwell determined that his balloon's gas envelope was too worn to carry out further flights. He constructed a new envelope which he named Britannia. It was capable of holding 100,000 cu ft (2,800 m^{3}) of gas, a volume increase of 10%. The new balloon required low-altitude flights for testing and to make the envelope gas-tight, so Coxwell carried out a series of demonstration flights in June at Crystal Palace and Derby. Coxwell planned a further flight on 11 July 1864 from the racecourse at Victoria Park, Leicester during a fete organised by the Foresters Friendly Society. Tickets were sold and 13 passengers, including two women, were scheduled to accompany Coxwell on his flight.

== Riot ==
The fete was attended by 50,000 people and was lightly policed—Coxwell later said there were only eight policemen on duty. The flight was to take place at 5:30 p.m. from a 15-acre (6.1 ha) field. The field was enclosed by a fence but there was only an insubstantial barrier surrounding the balloon. Early in the afternoon there was a disturbance when a man, saying he was an aeronaut, announced that Britannia was not Coxwell's newest and biggest balloon but an older model. This enraged the crowd who, shortly after 2:00 p.m., broke down the barrier and demanded that Coxwell take off immediately.

At around this time Coxwell's passengers forced their way into the balloon basket against his instructions in such a manner that prevented him from taking off. The carpenters necessary to remove the scaffold from around the balloon were also not available. One of the passengers then announced to the crowd that Coxwell was refusing to ascend and this, combined with his bad language and gestures, enraged them. It is said that the police, who numbered only five in the vicinity of the balloon, then struck a female member of the crowd on the forehead. She fell to the ground bleeding which is said to have caused further anger in the crowd.

A member of the crowd threw a bottle which damaged the balloon envelope and others tore the mesh enclosing it. Coxwell threatened that unless order was restored and the crowd moved back he would let the gas out of the balloon. There was no response to this, aside from verbal abuse, and Coxwell followed through on his threat. After the envelope collapsed the crowd surged forwards and tore it to pieces. The police, led by Inspector Haynes and Sergeant Chapman, attempted to hold back the crowd but could do little more than attempt to protect Coxwell. Coxwell was attacked, amid shouts of "rip him up", "knock him on the head" and "finish him", and his clothes were torn. One man who attempted to protect him was knocked to the ground three times. Coxwell eventually found refuge at the house of the town clerk, Mr. Stone, who lived nearby.

Britannia was destroyed and the balloon car, used for all of Coxwell's earlier ascents (including his famous high-altitude trip with Glaisher) was burnt. The metal hoop, which supported the envelope, was paraded through the streets of Leicester by the mob. One woman suffered injuries during the riot and was taken to hospital with a suspected broken back.

== Aftermath ==
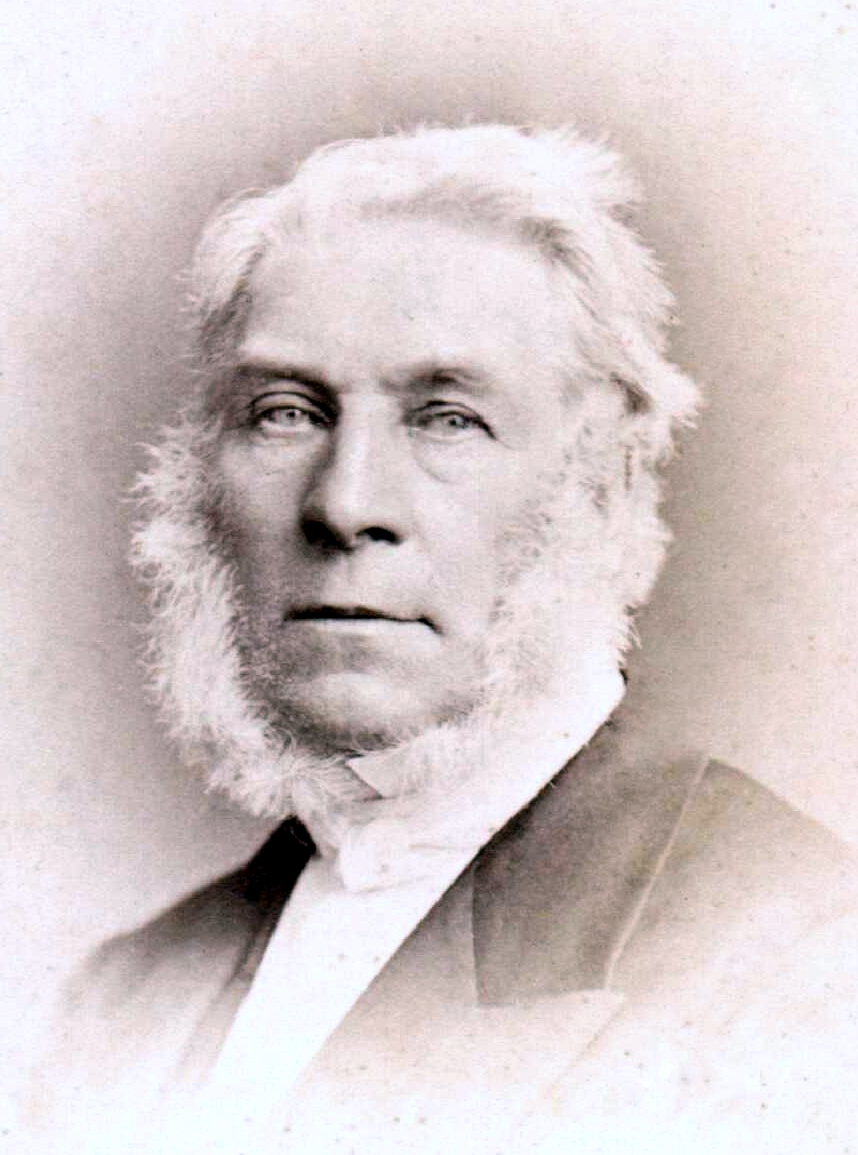
James Glaisher

Coxwell laid the blame for the riot with the Leicester City Police, whom he said had failed to provide a sufficient number of officers. He also stated that some of the mob wore the distinctive badge of the Foresters Society, apportioning some blame to them. The London Review of Politics, Society, Literature, Art and Science described the crowd as "a horde of savages as fierce and untamed as South Sea Islanders and differing very little from them except in their habitat, which was at Leicester" and the local residents were for some time known as "Balloonatics" due to their association with the riot. Leicester residents laid the blame on agitators from other cities such as Nottingham. The riot served as a demonstration of the ad hoc nature of early ballooning events and the lack of control aeronauts had over them.

The destruction of Britannia curtailed the number of high-altitude flights that the BA's balloon committee had planned to make in 1864. Glaisher noted that he "deeply regretted that a wanton mob destroyed [Coxwell's] property and that events should have followed leading me to stop the experiments in which I was engaged". Coxwell soon afterwards returned to low level flights using his old balloon and, on 29 August, made such a flight from Crystal Palace with Glaisher. He constructed a new balloon, Research, even larger than Britannia had been, which flew in 1865.

The new balloon was a considerable expense to Coxwell. He applied to the Foresters Society for a grant to cover his costs but their rules required a period of delay before he could be paid. The Mayor of Leicester, keen to restore the city's standing, led a campaign for public subscriptions to cover the costs. This raised some £500, of which £386 came from one individual—a Mr E. S. Ellis.

The riot marked the beginning of the end for Coxwell's association with Glaisher. Glaisher was associated with the London branch of the Foresters Society and supported Coxwell's application for funding. There was later a disagreement—Glaisher claimed Coxwell had behaved "impertinently" towards him over the matter. Indeed, one of Glaisher's allies described the Research as "ill-gotten property" due to the "way in which [Coxwell] obtained the money from Leicester".
