= Greenwich Time =

Greenwich Time may refer to:

- Greenwich Mean Time, the mean solar time at the Royal Observatory in Greenwich, London
- Greenwich Time Signal, a time calibration service
- Greenwich Time (newspaper), a Connecticut newspaper
- The Greenwich Time Lady, Ruth Belville who ran a time setting business from 1892 - 1940
- G:MT - Greenwich Mean Time, a 1999 British drama film
