= The Quarterly Journal of Pure and Applied Mathematics =

Mathematical journal

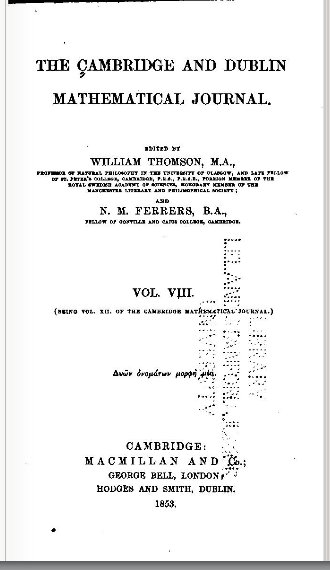
- 1853 cover
- Discipline: Mathematics
- Language: English

Publication details
- Former name(s): The Cambridge Mathematical Journal; The Cambridge and Dublin Mathematical Journal
- History: 1836–1927
- Frequency: Quarterly

Standard abbreviations
- ISO 4: Q. J. Pure Appl. Math.

The Quarterly Journal of Pure and Applied Mathematics was a mathematics journal that first appeared as such in 1855, but as the continuation of The Cambridge Mathematical Journal that had been launched in 1836 and had run in four volumes before changing its title to The Cambridge and Dublin Mathematical Journal for a further nine volumes (these latter volumes carried dual numbering). Papers in the first issue, which carried a preface dated April, 1855, and promised further issues on a quarterly schedule in June, September, December and March, have dates going back to November, 1854; the first volume carried a further preface dated January, 1857. From the outset, keeping the journal up and running was to prove a challenging task.

It was edited under the new title by James Joseph Sylvester and Norman Macleod Ferrers, assisted by George G. Stokes and Arthur Cayley, with Charles Hermite as corresponding editor in Paris, an arrangement that remained stable for the first fifteen volumes. With the sixteenth volume in 1879, the new editorial line-up was N. M. Ferrers, A. Cayley, and J. W. L. Glaisher. Andrew Forsyth was recruited to the board for the twentieth volume in 1885. However, the following decade saw an attrition in the editorship in short succession: Ferrers continued up to the twenty-fifth volume in 1891; Cayley the following volume in 1893; and Forsyth two volumes later, in 1895. Thus, by the twenty-eighth volume in 1896, Glaisher, who had edited Messenger of Mathematics single-handedly since its inception in May, 1870, was also left as the sole editor of the Quarterly.

It came to be felt that these periodicals had become so identified with Glaisher that it would be awkward to attempt to continue them after his death (in 1928). In the mid-1920s, this led G. H. Hardy to push for two new titles, the Journal of the London Mathematical Society and The Quarterly Journal (Oxford Series); Hardy was then secretary of the London Mathematical Society and Savilian Professor of Geometry at the University of Oxford.
