= Blatchington =

Blatchington may refer to the following places in England:

- East Blatchington
- West Blatchington
