= The Scouting Book for Boys =

- Directed by: Tom Harper
- Written by: Jack Thorne
- Produced by: Ivana Mackinnon
- Starring: Thomas Turgoose; Holliday Grainger; Rafe Spall; Susan Lynch; Tony Maudsley; Steven Mackintosh
- Cinematography: Robbie Ryan
- Edited by: Mark Eckersley
- Music by: Jack C. Arnold
- Production companies: Pathé; Film4 Productions; Celador Films; Screen East
- Distributed by: Warner Bros.
- Release dates: 21 September 2009 (San Sebastián); 19 March 2010 (United Kingdom)
- Running time: 93 minutes
- Country: United Kingdom
- Language: English
- Budget: £1 million

The Scouting Book for Boys is a 2009 British drama thriller film directed by Tom Harper in his directorial debut, produced by Ivana MacKinnon and written by Jack Thorne. It stars Thomas Turgoose, Holliday Grainger, Rafe Spall, Susan Lynch, Tony Maudsley and Steven Mackintosh.

The film premiered internationally at the San Sebastián International Film Festival and domestically at the BFI London Film Festival.

== Plot ==
Fourteen-year-old David is spending the summer hanging out with Emily, the only other teenager in his trailer park. When her mum, Sharon, loses custody, Emily refuses to live with her father and convinces David to help her hide in a cave. While he brings Emily supplies and keeps her secret, the police investigate her disappearance – and soon uncover Emily's relationship with her mother's boyfriend, Steve, igniting David's jealousy.

== Cast ==
- Thomas Turgoose as David
- Holliday Grainger as Emily
- Rafe Spall as Steve
- Susan Lynch as Sharon
- Tony Maudsley as Jim
- Steven Mackintosh as DI Kertzer
- Ann Eisley as Lucy
- Ewan Macintosh as Charlie
- Ruth Wellman as Mrs. Fry
- Lorraine Bruce as Betty
- Candice Manning as Candice

== Reception ==
The film received mixed reviews from critics. On the review aggregator website Rotten Tomatoes, 55% of 22 critics' reviews are positive, with an average rating of 6.2/10.
