= The Aeronauts (film) =

2019 film directed by Tom Harper

- Theatrical release poster
- Directed by: Tom Harper
- Screenplay by: Jack Thorne
- Story by: Tom Harper; Jack Thorne
- Based on: Falling Upwards: How We Took to the Air by Richard Holmes
- Produced by: Todd Lieberman; David Hoberman; Tom Harper
- Starring: Eddie Redmayne; Felicity Jones; Himesh Patel; Tom Courtenay
- Cinematography: George Steel
- Edited by: Mark Eckersley
- Music by: Steven Price
- Production companies: Mandeville Films; FilmNation Entertainment
- Distributed by: Entertainment One (United Kingdom); Amazon Studios (United States)
- Release dates: 30 August 2019 (Telluride); 4 November 2019 (United Kingdom); 6 December 2019 (United States)
- Running time: 100 minutes
- Countries: United Kingdom; United States
- Language: English
- Budget: $40 million
- Box office: $7 million

The Aeronauts is a 2019 biographical adventure film directed by Tom Harper and written by Jack Thorne, from a story co-written by Thorne and Harper. The film is based on the 2013 book Falling Upwards: How We Took to the Air by Richard Holmes. Produced by Todd Lieberman, David Hoberman, and Tom Harper, the film stars Eddie Redmayne, Felicity Jones, Himesh Patel and Tom Courtenay.

The film had its world premiere at the Telluride Film Festival on 30 August 2019, followed by a showing at the 2019 Toronto International Film Festival. It was released in the United Kingdom on 4 November 2019, and in the United States on 6 December 2019. The film received mostly positive reviews from critics, but was the subject of controversy for its historical revisionism of one of the two protagonists.

== Plot ==
In 1862 London, balloon pilot Amelia Wren and scientist James Glaisher board the largest balloon ever constructed for its inaugural launch. (Note: Rennes and Wren are both stated as the last name of the lead, Amelia. The character is credited as "Amelia Wren" although in the film Amelia is shown looking at a handbill with the notice "The aeronaut and his bride, Pierre and Amelia Rennes, 14th September 1856" and her husband's graveside bears the inscription "In loving memory Pierre Rennes".) Despite haunting visions of her late husband Pierre, Amelia keeps a brave front as the balloon launches to a cheering crowd. In a flashback, James is mocked by his fellow scientists after he presents his theories about weather forecasting to the Royal Society. Unable to believe weather can be accurately predicted, they refuse to finance his studies and his parents try to persuade him to pursue other scientific avenues. In the present, the balloon rises through the cloud layer into a violent storm. As the balloon goes into a spin, Amelia flashes back to her sister Antonia convincing her to attend a society function where James asks her to pilot his balloon in a privately funded expedition.

James suffers a head injury but the pair makes it through the storm and the balloon continues rising into an air current which is home to a group of butterflies, confirming a theory of James's friend, John Trew, that insects can travel on air currents. The balloon exceeds an altitude of 23,000 ft (7,000 m), beating the standing record. Amelia is surprised James didn't bring suitable clothes for the colder air aloft and starts a descent, starting an argument. Amelia agrees to keep rising. In another flashback, John tells Amelia she has an obligation to advance the cause of science. Amelia relects at Pierre's grave, and the sight of snow, proving James' prediction, convinces her to accompany him.

James experiences hypoxia but insists they keep rising, relenting only when Amelia tells how Pierre sacrificed himself to save her during a balloon flight. James falls unconscious and Amelia must climb up the outside of the balloon to open the frozen release valve. Frostbite settles on her hands and she wedges her boot into the valve to ensure the slow release of the gas. Amelia loses consciousness and topples over the side. Saved by her rope tether, Amelia revives, swings back into the balloon, and rouses James. When they realize the balloon has lost too much gas, they close the gas release and throw everything expendable over the side, including James's equipment. Unable to arrest their descent, they climb into the framework and release the basket. Realising that Amelia is ready to sacrifice herself to save him, James converts the rest of the balloon into a parachute to slow their descent. They crash through trees and hit the ground hard, with Amelia dragged unconscious behind the balloon before it stops. She revives to see James stagger towards her. Both are injured but euphoric they've set a new human flight altitude record. James's findings prove the existence of layers in the atmosphere, paving the way for the first weather forecasts, and he and Amelia build a new balloon so they can continue research together.

== Cast ==
- Eddie Redmayne as James Glaisher
- Felicity Jones as Amelia
- Himesh Patel as John Trew, James's friend
- Tom Courtenay as Arthur Glaisher, James's father
- Phoebe Fox as Antonia, Amelia's sister
- Rebecca Front as Aunt Frances
- Robert Glenister as Ned Chambers
- Vincent Perez as Pierre Rennes, Amelia's husband
- Anne Reid as Ethel Glaisher, James's mother
- Lewin Lloyd as Charlie
- Tim McInnerny as Airy
- Thomas Arnold as Charles Green
- Lisa Jackson as Poppy
- Elsa Alili and Connie Price as Antonia's daughters
- Bella as Posey the dog

== Production ==
In December 2016, Amazon Studios purchased the film rights to Jack Thorne's spec script. In mid-2018, Felicity Jones and Eddie Redmayne were confirmed to star in the film. They were reunited after The Theory of Everything (2014), directed by James Marsh, as their past work and real-life friendship would help them in this new collaboration.

Principal photography began in early August 2018, in West London Film Studios, with George Steel serving as cinematographer. Filming locations in England included the Royal Naval College, Greenwich, Regent's Park, London, Claydon House, Buckinghamshire, the Bodleian Library in Oxford, Wrotham Park, London and The Historic Dockyard Chatham in Kent.

Key action sequences in The Aeronauts were designed for IMAX and feature an expanded aspect ratio for both IMAX and select Premium Large Format cinemas.

== Historical accuracy ==
The film is based on an amalgam of the flights detailed in Richard Holmes' 2013 book Falling Upwards: How We Took to the Air (ISBN 978-0-00-738692-5). The most significant balloon flight depicted in The Aeronauts is based on the 5 September 1862 flight of British aeronauts James Glaisher and Henry Coxwell whose coal gas-filled balloon broke the world flight altitude record, reaching 30,000 to 36,000 ft (9,000 to 11,000 m). However, while Glaisher appears in the film, Coxwell has been replaced by Amelia, a fictional character.

The real flight started from Wolverhampton on the site of the town gas works and ended in the Gorsebrook area of the town. The film moves the action to London.

A report in The Daily Telegraph quotes Keith Moore, Head of Library at the Royal Society, as saying, "It's a great shame that Henry [Coxwell] isn't portrayed because he performed very well and saved the life of a leading scientist". Moore then criticised the film's fictional female protagonist, stating “There were so many deserving female scientists of that period who haven't had films made about them. Why not do that instead?" In an interview with The List, Harper explained that whilst the film was inspired by a number of historical flights, the intention was never to make a documentary and he wanted the film to be reflective of a contemporary audience. He also commented on a gender bias in science, stating "There were female scientists around at the time, but not in the Royal Society... to this day, only eight per cent of the Royal Society is female."

Other critics of the film have praised Amelia as an important, aspirational female character. Sasha Stone of Awards Daily wrote that The Aeronauts "inspires young girls and nudges the perspectives of young boys... (revealing) that women can be just as excited about taking a hero's journey as any man can."

In addition to Coxwell, real-life individuals who compose Amelia's character include:

- Sophie Blanchard, the first woman to work as a professional balloonist, who became a celebrated aeronaut following her husband's death. Felicity Jones has stated that Blanchard was the inspiration for her character.
- Margaret Graham, a British aeronaut and entertainer.

Amelia's relationship with husband Pierre is chiefly based on Sophie Blanchard's flights with husband Jean-Pierre Blanchard, while Pierre's death is inspired by that of Thomas Harris on 25 May 1824.

The Latin motto inscribed on the side of the balloon Caelum certe patet, ibimus illi ("Surely the sky lies open to us, let us go that way") was used on a real balloon, albeit on a much earlier flight than the one depicted in the film. Its use is somewhat ironic, as the source of the quote, Book VIII of Ovid's Metamorphoses, relates the story of Icarus, who plunged to his death after flying too near the sun.

== Release ==
The film had its world premiere at the Telluride Film Festival on 30 August 2019. It also screened at the 2019 Toronto International Film Festival on 8 September 2019. Entertainment One gave the film a full theatrical release in the United Kingdom on 4 November, including screenings in 4DX and IMAX. Amazon Studios released the film in the United States on 6 December for a limited theatrical run, before debuting it on Amazon Prime Video outside of the United Kingdom on 20 December 2019. The film was released in China, on November 13, 2020.

In October 2019, it was announced that The Aeronauts would screen at the IMAX TCL Chinese Theatre as part of AFI Fest.

Additionally, the film earned a spot at the 2019 Whistler Film Festival, in Whistler, BC Canada, December 2019.

=== Streaming ===
Although Amazon does not release exact streaming figures, Jennifer Salke, head of Amazon Studios, said in an interview with Deadline Hollywood that, as of January 2020, The Aeronauts was the most viewed movie of all time on Amazon Prime.

== Reception ==
=== Box office ===
The Aeronauts has grossed an estimated $340,000 in North America and $6.6 million in other territories, for a worldwide total of $7 million, against a production budget of $40 million.

As with its other release The Report, Amazon did not publicly release box office results for the film. Of the 186 locations that did screen it in its opening weekend (6 December 2019) 48 reported a combined gross of around $30,000. IndieWire estimated the film made a total of $185,000 in its opening weekend, an average of $1,000 per-venue. It then made an estimated $100,000 from 85 theatres in its second weekend, before its 20 December streaming debut on Amazon Prime.

=== Critical response ===
On Rotten Tomatoes, the film has an approval rating of 71% based on 189 reviews, with an average rating of 6.5/10. The website's critics consensus states, "Thrilling visuals and the substantial chemistry of its well-matched leads make The Aeronauts an adventure well worth taking." On Metacritic, the film has a weighted average score of 60 out of 100, based on reviews from 37 critics, indicating "mixed or average reviews".

Todd McCarthy of The Hollywood Reporter wrote: "The Aeronauts achieves impressive elevation as a bracing and sympathetic account of two early and very different aviators who together reached literal new heights in a perilous field of endeavor." Fionnuala Halligan of Screen International wrote about the chemistry of the lead actors and the great craft on display in the film: "With the widest of wide-screens, the most vertiginous of vistas, this hot air balloon takes to the skies and soars." Tomris Laffly of Variety praised the visuals and the lead performers: "The duo [of Redmayne and Jones] hand-in-hand elevates The Aeronauts...from a flimsy action-adventure to something worth watching on the biggest possible screen, even if it operates on a handful of clichés with little character-based substance to speak of."

Many critics also applauded the film's special effects and visuals. Peter Bradshaw of The Guardian noted the film's "terrific special effects" and "high-anxiety suspense". Eric Kohn of IndieWire wrote: "When so many supersized blockbusters take the potential of CGI action for granted, The Aeronauts finds a fresh use for it by turning the exhilaration of discovery into a real visual treat." In a generally positive review, critic Bob Mondello showed special enthusiasm for the airborne scenes, writing: "I cannot say strongly enough that if you can see it in IMAX, you should see it in IMAX, where if you're even a little bit afraid of heights, it will likely scare you shoutless."

=== Accolades ===
Award	Category	Recipients	Result	Ref.
25th Critics' Choice Awards	Best Visual Effects	The Aeronauts	Nominated	
Houston Film Critics Society Awards 2019	Best Original Song	"Home to You" – The Aeronauts	Nominated	
9th Music + Sound Awards	Best Sound Design in a Feature Film	Lee Walpole, Andy Kennedy, Saoirse Christopherson, Jeff Richardson, Philip Clements, Sarah Elias, Catherine Thomas, Anna Wright, Gibran Farrah, Stuart Hilliker	Nominated	
24th San Diego Film Critics Society Awards	Best Visual Effects	The Aeronauts	Nominated	
18th Visual Effects Society Awards	Outstanding Supporting Visual Effects in a Photoreal Feature	Louis Morin, Annie Godin, Christian Kaestner, Ara Khanikian, Mike Dawson	Nominated	
16th Women Film Critics Circle Awards	Best Equality of the Sexes	The Aeronauts	Nominated	
19th World Stunt Awards	Best Work with a Vehicle	Stunt Team of The Aeronauts	Nominated	
