= Cecilia Glaisher =

English photographer, artist, illustrator and print-maker

- Born: Cecilia Louisa Belville; 20 April 1828; Greenwich, Kent, England
- Died: 28 December 1892 (aged 64)
- Spouse: James Glaisher (1809–1903)
- Children: Cecilia Appelina Glaisher; James Whitbread Lee Glaisher; Ernest Henry Glaisher
- Parent: John Henry Belville (father)

Cecilia Glaisher (20 April 1828 – 28 December 1892) was an English amateur photographer, artist, illustrator and print-maker, working in the 1850s world of Victorian science and natural history.

== Early life and marriage ==
Cecilia Louisa Glaisher (née Belville) was born on 20 April 1828, in Greenwich, Kent. Her father, John Henry Belville (1795–1856), was an assistant astronomical observer at the Royal Observatory, Greenwich, and author of A Manual of the Barometer (London: R. & J.E. Taylor, 1849) and A Manual Of The Thermometer (London: R. & J.E. Taylor, 1850). It is not known whether Cecilia Belville received any formal or scientific education, although an upbringing where the recording of astronomical and meteorological phenomena was part of daily life suggests an awareness of a wider world view than that given to many nineteenth-century British females. It is recorded in one of her father’s work books that she had her first painting lesson on 17 April 1841, from Mr Villalobos.

She married James Glaisher (1809–1903), at All Souls Church, St Marylebone, on 31 December 1843. The Glaishers had three children: Cecilia Appelina Glaisher (1845–1932), James Whitbread Lee Glaisher (1848–1928), and Ernest Henry Glaisher (1858–1885).

James Glaisher's career is well documented. He was elected a Fellow of the Royal Society in 1849 and became a member of many other learned societies. He was President of the (Royal) Meteorological Society in 1867-8, the (Royal) Microscopical Society in 1865-9, and the (Royal) Photographic Society during the years 1869–92. He worked at the Royal Observatory, Greenwich, from 1836 to 1874, from 1840 as Superintendent of the newly created Meteorological and Magnetic Department, when George Biddell Airy (1801–1892) was Astronomer Royal.

It is likely that everything Cecilia Glaisher learnt about photography would have been through her husband, perhaps initially by helping and later collaborating with him, and through contacts with other scientists and photographers in the world the Glaishers moved in, especially at Hartwell House in Buckinghamshire, the home of Dr John Lee (1783–1866). Like many women at the time, Cecilia Glaisher's artistic skills would have been of great use both to her husband and possibly other scientists with whom they mixed.

Women were actively participating in acquiring scientific knowledge, whether by actual research or by carefully recording, classifying, or illustrating specimens. But as science became "professionalised" during the 1850s women were excluded from the majority of learned society meetings where research was discussed and papers read. They were usually permitted only to attend social occasions or "scientific conversazioni" on carefully selected topics. They were not granted membership to the majority of learned societies, in some cases until halfway through the twentieth century. Recognition and public acknowledgement of contributions by women was the exception.

It is not clear just when Cecilia Glaisher began making images photographically, but by 1855 she is documented as having started work on The British Ferns.

== Work ==
The British Ferns – Photographed from Nature by Mrs Glaisher was planned as an illustrated guide to identifying ferns, with the entomologist Edward Newman (1801–1876), a fern expert and publisher. Made using William Henry Fox Talbot's photogenic drawing process during what has come to be known as the Victorian fern craze, it was to be published in a number of parts and intended to appeal to the growing number of fern collectors whose enthusiasm was fuelled by increasingly informative and magnificently illustrated fern publications. The use of photography, according to the printed handbill produced by Newman to promote the work, would allow fern specimens to be "displayed with incomparable exactness, producing absolute facsimiles of the objects, perfect in artistic effect and structural details". A portfolio of ten prints, in mounts embossed with Newman's publishing details, was presented by him to the Linnean Society in London in December 1855. However, perhaps due to an inability to raise sufficient subscriptions, or difficulties in producing prints in consistent quantities, the project appears to have been abandoned by 1856.

During the same period, Cecilia Glaisher worked in collaboration with her husband on a study intended to distinguish different types of snow crystal structure and understand how they were formed. One hundred and fifty-one of her schematic drawings were used to illustrate her husband's paper, On the Severe Weather at the beginning of the year 1855: and on Snow and Snow Crystals, published by the Meteorological Society. These schematic drawings were based on original sketches made at the Glaishers' window from direct observation of snow crystals seen through magnifying lenses. They show snow crystals 'perfected' and re-drawn to represent classifiable types of structure. In his book, Snow Crystals, Natural and Artificial, Ukichiro Nakaya describes them as the most accurate observations of snow crystals published before the development of photomicrography. They have been used since 1868 by the Royal Microscopical Society as the basis of the design for its seal and emblem.

Other work made by Cecilia Glaisher at this time consists of a series of leaf impressions on paper, to which colour has been added by hand, to show species of leaves at different seasons. These are collected into an album, Leaves of the British forest trees Nature Printed, 1857 CJ Glaisher, presumably the initials of both Cecilia and James Glaisher.

== Publications ==
- The British Ferns – Photographed from Nature by Mrs Glaisher. Unpublished project, c. 1855, with Edward Newman.
- "On the Severe Weather at the beginning of the year 1855: and on Snow and Snow Crystals", by James Glaisher, Esq., Sec. of BMS. Published in the Report of the Council of the British Meteorological Society, read at the Fifth Annual General Meeting, 22 May 1855.

== Exhibitions ==
- Glasgow: 12 photographs of ferns exhibited at the Photography Exhibition held to coincide with the British Association for the Advancement of Science meeting, September 1855.
- London: 2 albumen prints of ferns, lent by James Glaisher FRS for inclusion in the International Inventions Exhibition held at South Kensington in May 1885.
