= Liz Gerring =

American choreographer

Liz Gerring is an American choreographer. She was trained at the Cornish Institute in Seattle, and received a B.F.A. from the Juilliard School. In 1998, she founded the Liz Gerring Dance Company, a contemporary dance ensemble. Gerring was commissioned by the Martha Graham Dance Company to create a new work for the Lamentation Variations project; other choreographers on the project were Kyle Abraham, Aszure Barton, Lar Lubovitch, and Yvonne Rainer. Gerring's work Glacier (2013) was nominated for a New York Dance and Performance (“Bessie”) Award, and in 2015 she was presented with the Jacob's Pillow Dance Award.

Gerring has developed her work consistently with a small group of collaborators since 2001. Meeting during their studies at Juilliard in the 1980s, composer Michael J. Schumacher has collaborated with Ms. Gerring providing scores for 11 of her 13 works between 1998 and 2017.

From 2001 to 2011 Ursula Scherrer provided video and video set design for four Gerring works and continues to work with the company. From 2004 to 2011 Carolyn Wong provided both production and lighting design for Gerring's works.

Eric Rosenzveig began managing the Liz Gerring Dance Company in 2003, assuming the executive director position from 2009 to 2017. Elizabeth DeMent, principal dancer in 2009's Montauk and 2011's Lichtung / Clearing, has worked as administrator and company manager from 2009 until the present.

Other collaborators include visual artists: Burt Barr who provided video and video set design for When You Lose Something You Can't Replace; Vittoria Chierici sets for Montauk; Willy LeMaitre video for she dreams in code; Kay Rosen video, and video set design in collaboration with Joshua Higgason for (T)here To (T)here. Robert Wierzel provided production design for glacier and Horizon in collaboration with Amith Chandrashaker, company production manager since 2014.
