= Messenger of Mathematics =

- Discipline: Mathematics
- Language: English

Publication details
- History: 1871–1929
- Publisher: Macmillan and Co. (England)

Standard abbreviations
- ISO 4: Messenger Math.

Indexing
- OCLC no.: 2448539

The Messenger of Mathematics is a defunct British mathematics journal. The founding editor-in-chief was William Allen Whitworth with Charles Taylor and volumes 1–58 were published between 1872 and 1929. James Whitbread Lee Glaisher was the editor-in-chief after Whitworth. In the nineteenth century, foreign contributions represented 4.7% of all pages of mathematics in the journal.

== History ==
The journal was originally titled Oxford, Cambridge and Dublin Messenger of Mathematics. It was supported by mathematics students and governed by a board of editors composed of members of the universities of Oxford, Cambridge and Dublin (the last being its sole constituent college, Trinity College Dublin). Volumes 1–5 were published between 1862 and 1871. It merged with The Quarterly Journal of Pure and Applied Mathematics to form the Quarterly Journal of Mathematics.
