= Vittoria Chierici =

Italian artist (born 1955)

Vittoria Chierici (born 7 April 1955) is an Italian artist.

== Life and career ==
Chierici was born in Bologna but moved to Milan with her family where she finished her high school studies before returning to Bologna to attend DAMS (the Dance, Art, Music and Performing Arts Department of the University of Bologna) where she earned a Degree in Art History with Prof. Paolo Fossati.

In 1979, she moved to the United States to complete her studies, first at the University of Berkeley and then at Columbia University where she enrolled in the Doctoral Program in Twentieth Century American Art. At the same time she attended photography classes at the Parsons School of Design and the School of Visual Arts (SVA) in New York where she met painter David Salle. In 1981 she opened an exhibition space called Parallel Window together with painter Emanuela Filiaci.

In 1983 she returned to Italy and invited by Francesca Alinovi participated in the "Enfatisti" movement, a group of young artists from Bologna who showed their paintings at the Neon gallery. One year later she moved back to Milan where she participated in the group show “Dall’olio all’Aeroplanino” held at the Studio San Gottardo that had just been opened by Corrado Levi.

In 1992 Levi selected her to represent Italy with her installation “Coca Cola Classic” at the international exhibit “The Seven Artists” organized in Tokyo by INFAS and Hanae Mori's family. In 1991, together with other artists, she founded Slam, an irregularly published contemporary art journal. In 1991, together with artists Stefano Arienti, Amedeo Martegani and Mario Dellavedova, Chierici founded the company "Art & Mass".

In 1992 she collaborated with the journal Rendiconti directed by poet Roberto Roversi. Having moved back to the US shortly after, she started attending the New York Film Academy where she earned a degree in cinematography, a discipline that she promptly incorporated into her painting. In 1993 she produced two early shorts, Street Fight and One’s Case, which were screened in art video settings. Still in 1993, following the Gulf War she started painting inspired the “battle” genre of painting. Her approach to the genre "… was studied and re-conceived in the light of all the battles (true and imaginary) as told by movies, literature and painting", unreal armies made of timeless soldiers against a photographic background.

In 1995, Chierici returned to Italy where she delivered lectures on contemporary art and taught workshops in several universities and academies. In 1997 she published Aftermath, a bilingual Italian-English essay on the state of contemporary art. In 2000, the City of Anghiari commissioned her to paint a large canvas on the theme of Leonardo da Vinci, The Battle of Anghiari. The following year the University of Bologna awarded Chierici the DAMS career prize, to celebrate the 30 year anniversary of the department’s founding. From 2003 to 2006 Chierici was the faculty member in charge of teaching the Design, Fashion and Installation course at the Polytechnic University of Milan.

Since 2003, Chierici has been living between Bologna and New York where she shows her work and collaborates with US artists including composer Eve Beglarian, choreographer Liz Gerring, video-artist Burt Barr, violinist and composer Ana Milosavljevic, with whom she made the movie Luci in the Sky.

In early 2012 Chierici prepared a letter both to clarify to herself and explain to others a new project titled "I want to sail away and paint the sea". The appeal was addressed to friends and collectors and found 85 sponsors each rewarded with a painting, and thus she was able to go on an artistic cruise. On June 20 the artist boarded the Isolda, a Polish merchant ship for a 16 days Atlantic Ocean crossing that went along Newfoundland, up the Saint Lawrence river ending up in Cleveland. The short "Sailing away to paint the sea" was born out of this experience as well as the film "Hands in Blue", edited by milanese composer Maurizio Pisati also responsible for the film score. The trip also inspired a brief exhibition held at the Galleria dei Frigoriferi Milanesi, at the end of which sponsors received their painting.

From 2014 to 2016 Vittoria Chierici has been working on multiple projects such as Les Roses, a group of mixed media paintings after a book of poems about the rose by Rainer Maria Rilke. This project has been first presented by the Rilke Foundation in Sierre Switzerland and afterwards exhibited in a solo show in Milano at the Giardini dell'Arte, at PAC, organized by the Frigoriferi Milanesi and curated by Francesco Cataluccio.

Back in New York, in 2016 Chierici had a studio in Union Square where she developed a new research on another Italian great Renaissance masterpiece, producing a series of 44 paintings with the title of The Philosophers’ Clothes, this time inspired by The School of Athens, the large fresco painted by Raphael in the Room of Signature, in the Vatican palace. The Philosophers’ Clothes have been exhibited in 2018 at the art gallery Neochrome in Torino, in the same year at the FiveMyles Gallery in New York (curated by Jennifer Bacon) and in 2021 at the Rossi&Rossi gallery in Hong Kong (curated by Filippo Fossati).

From 2017 Vittoria Chierici has been living in Eastport, Maine, the easternmost city in the USA, by the Atlantic Ocean on the border with the Canadian state of New Brunswick. Here she evolved her other big subject of her artwork focusing on the relationship between the energy and the beauty of nature with the history of humankind. In Eastport Chierici recycled boat sails to be painted with the colors of the Ocean. And installed around the town during the annual ArtWalk. These sails were conceived to be part of a contemporary dance experiment, outdoor by the Ocean with the collaboration of choreographer Liz Gerring and composer Eve Beglarian. A first happening with the title of Working the Waters was presented in summer and produced by the museum and foundation, the Tide Institute and Museum of Arts, in Eastport.

Chierici’s works are part of permanent collections in important cultural institutions, both in Italy and abroad, such as Milan’s PAC, Rome’s GNAM, Rovereto's MART and the New York University.
