= Iceberg (disambiguation) =

An iceberg is a large piece of ice that has broken off from a snow-formed glacier or ice shelf, and is floating in open water.

Iceberg or Iceburg may also refer to:

== Brands and enterprises ==
- Iceberg (fashion house), an Italian luxury fashion house
- Iceberg Interactive, a Dutch video game publisher

== Fictional characters ==
- Iceberg, comic book character in Amalgam Comics, see list of Amalgam Comics characters
- Iceberg, anime character from Transformers: Armada
- Iceberg, comic book character, see list of G.I. Joe: A Real American Hero characters
- Iceberg, comic book character related to Kingpin
- Iceburgh, the mascot of the Pittsburgh Penguins hockey team.

== Literature ==
- Iceberg (Banks novel), a David Banks novel based on Doctor Who
- Iceberg (Cussler novel), a Dirk Pitt novel by Clive Cussler
- "The Iceberg", a poem by Edwin John Pratt
- "The Iceberg", a 1934 poem by C. G. D. Roberts

== Music ==
=== Groups ===
- Iceberg, Deke Leonard's progressive rock band

=== Albums ===
- The Iceberg/Freedom of Speech... Just Watch What You Say!, a 1989 album by Ice-T
- The Iceberg (Oddisee album) (2017)
- Iceberg, a 2007 EP by Kodigo Norte
- Iceberg, a 1986 album by Krisma
- Iceberg, a 1973 album by Deke Leonard

=== Songs ===
- "Iceberg", a song by 10cc from How Dare You!
- "Iceberg", a song by Baby Bird from Fatherhood
- "Iceberg", a song by Børns from Blue Madonna
- "Iceberg", a song by the Lovely Feathers from My Best Friend Daniel
- "Iceberg", a song by Alla Pugacheva from Akh, kak khochetsya zhit
- "Iceberg", a song by Tweet from It's Me Again

== People ==
- Yung Berg or Iceberg (born 1985), American rapper from Chicago
- Edward Chastain or Iceberg, professional wrestler

== Plants ==
- Iceberg lettuce, a lettuce cultivar
- Rosa Iceberg, a rose cultivar

== Visual art ==
- The Icebergs, a 1861 painting by Frederic Edwin Church
- The Iceberg (1891 painting), a painting by Frederic Edwin Church

== Other uses ==
- Iceberg (orca)
- Iceberg Theory, a writing style
- Operation Iceberg, codename for Battle of Okinawa
- Apache Iceberg, a format for data

== People with the nickname ==
- Iceberg Slim or Robert Beck (1918–1992), African-American pimp and author
- Iceberg Slimm or Duane Dyer (born 1978), a Black British rapper and founder of Frojak Entertainment
- Iceberg Slim (musician) or Olusegun Olowokere, a Nigerian rapper

== See also ==
- Ice Mountain (disambiguation)
