= Glacier (dance work) =

Glacier is a Bessie Awards-nominated dance work by contemporary choreographer Liz Gerring.
