= USS Glacier =

USS Glacier may refer to:

- USS Glacier (AF-4), launched as SS Port Chalmers 22 July 1891; purchased, commissioned, renamed Delmonico in 1898 and then Glacier in the same year; decommissioned and sold in 1922
- USS Glacier (CVE-33), a Bogue-class escort carrier, LR number: 6115266 launched in 1942; transferred to the Royal Navy in 1943 and served during World War II as HMS Atheling, a Ruler-class escort carrier; struck in 1947
- USS Glacier (AK-183), an Alamosa-class cargo ship, LR number: 5401156, launched in 1944 and struck in 1946
- USS Glacier (AGB-4), later (WAGB-4), an icebreaker of unique design, LR number: 6123672, launched in 1954 and struck in 1966
