= Glacier (band) =

Japanese visual kei rock band

- Also known as: グレイシア, GLACIER
- Origin: Nishihara, Okinawa, Japan
- Genres: Rock
- Years active: 2007–present
- Labels: Crown (2008); Hibiscus (2009–present)
- Members: Makoto (vocal); Nao (guitar); Aki (bass)
- Past members: Kōjirō (guitar); Yūki (drums)
- Website: glacier-official.com

Glacier (styled as GLACIER) is a visual kei rock band from Okinawa, Japan. Makoto, Nao and Aki have been friends since they were elementary schoolchildren. The three members started the band in Okinawa. They released a CD single Nangoku Shōjo from a Japanese record label Crown Records on 23 July 2008.

== Biography ==
=== Origin ===
Glacier means a mass of ice on the mountains or rivers. Originating in Okinawa, their music style might be categorised as Okinawan music.

=== Move to Tokyo ===
The band then moved to Tokyo. They expressed the intention to retain Okinawan influence on the lyrics of the title song "Nangoku Shōjo" from the first CD single Nangoku Shōjo. Makoto, who wrote the lyrics, told that he constructed the words for the listeners to remind southern islands because he wanted them to understand easily the band's hometown and feelings. From this way of thinking, the band has begun to widen the Okinawan club pops as the point in their Okinawan entertainment.

=== Album ===
The first album Ryūkyū Carmen 80's has been made with atmosphere of Okinawan music, using computer music and adding popular melodies like Kayōkyoku. Nao, who composed many songs in this album, said that these sounds were born naturally from his inside. Not only Okinawan club pops, but also southern islands were also one of the concepts of the album. So, a song "Ryūkyū Carmen", which was conscious of Spanish passionate sound, was recorded in the album. This song was the first to complete while the band were composing the songs for the album.

The band released a CD single SADISTIC LOVE on 17 December 2008. The previous work Ryūkyū Carmen 80's was released by Crown Records, a member of RIAJ, but the single has been released by an indie label this time. The song "Nangoku Shōjo" was one of the songs representative of the band, and it described a bittersweet young love story in Okinawa. As opposed to the song, a tune of SADISTIC LOVE emphasised a taste of House music, it also expressed an old-fashioned and smart atmosphere. Okinawa Radio or FM21.

=== 2009 Okinawan concerts, CD single ===
They had a one-man concert at Naha, Okinawa, Japan on 14 August 2009. And they were invited to a special stage of a traditional event Tsuna Festa Yonabaru 2009 to perform a short concert at Yonabaru, Okinawa on 15 August.

The band released a CD single Kanasambana as the first work of their own label on 4 November 2009. Naoya Yoshida, who was a guitarist of Valentine D.C., took the post of sound producer on the work. The performance of the special stage at Tsuna Festa Yonabaru 2009 was recorded on a DVD attached to the CD. Love Chuppa, a radio programme of Okinawa Radio, broadcast a thirty-minute special programme featuring this CD Kanasambana and the band without the members' appearance. Not "Made in Japan" but "Made in Okinawa" was printed on the package of the CD Kanasambana.

Kōjirō, who was a support guitarist until the days before 8 November 2009, has joined to the band as a regular member at the one-man concert on the day.

=== Personnel changes ===
Kōjirō (guitarist) and Yūki (drummer) left the band on 25 November 2010.

== Discography ==
=== Single ===
- Ryūkyū Renka (11 November 2007 / EXCC-0113)
- Nangoku Shōjo (23 July 2008 / CRCP-10202)
- SADISTIC LOVE (17 December 2008 / XQDT-1010)
- Kanasambana (4 November 2009 / HMCG-10001)
- The Dancing Branches (28 April 2010 / Released as music download)
- Hoshi no Shirushi [Signs upon a star ] (26 May 2010 / Released as music download)
- Ai no Furu Machi [Lovefall Street ] (30 June 2010 / Released as music download)
- Kariyushi [Celebration ] (28 July 2010 / Released as music download)

=== Album ===
- Ryūkyū Carmen 80's (6 August 2008 / CRCP-40212)

=== Video ===
- Tokyo Kanasambana (Weekly release only for Japanese mobile phone)
1. Nangoku Shōjo (Released on 24 February 2010)
2. Aoi Chura Shima (Released on 3 March 2010)
3. SADISTIC LOVE (Released on 10 March 2010)
4. Orion no Tegami (Released on 17 March 2010)
5. Kiku Saki Beni Ao (Released on 24 March 2010)
6. Urizun Biyori - Rainy Days (Released on 31 March 2010)
7. Ryūkyū Carmen (Released on 7 April 2010)
8. Kugatsu incense (Released on 14 April 2010)
9. Rhythmic Interlude (Released on 21 April 2010)
10. Doll Parade (Released on 28 April 2010)
11. Kariyushi (Released on 12 May 2010)
12. Hoshi no Shirushi (Released on 19 May 2010)
13. Shima Uta (Released on 26 May 2010)
14. Hoshizuna (Released on 2 June 2010)
15. Kanasambana (Released on 9 June 2010)
16. Diego no Hana ga Saku koro ni (Released on 16 June 2010)
17. Taiyō no Kuni (Released on 23 June 2010)

=== Compilation album ===
- Shock Edge 2008 (15 October 2008 / SWCD-2008)

== Tie-in ==
Song	Subject	Period
Nangoku Shōjo	As an ending theme song of a TV programme Empura, broadcast by Tokyo Broadcasting System in Japan.	From July to September, 2008
