= Glacier Pass =

Mountain pass in Nunavut, Canada

- Location within Nunavut

Third Approach
- Location: Nunavut, Canada
- Coordinates: 81°56′07″N 71°38′39″W
- Topo map: NTS 120C13 Johns Island

Glacier Pass is a mountain pass on northern Ellesmere Island, Nunavut, Canada. It is located in Quttinirpaaq National Park on the northeastern corner of Ellesmere Island.
