= East Blatchington =

Suburb of Seaford, East Sussex, England

Coordinates: 50.77608°N 0.10485°E

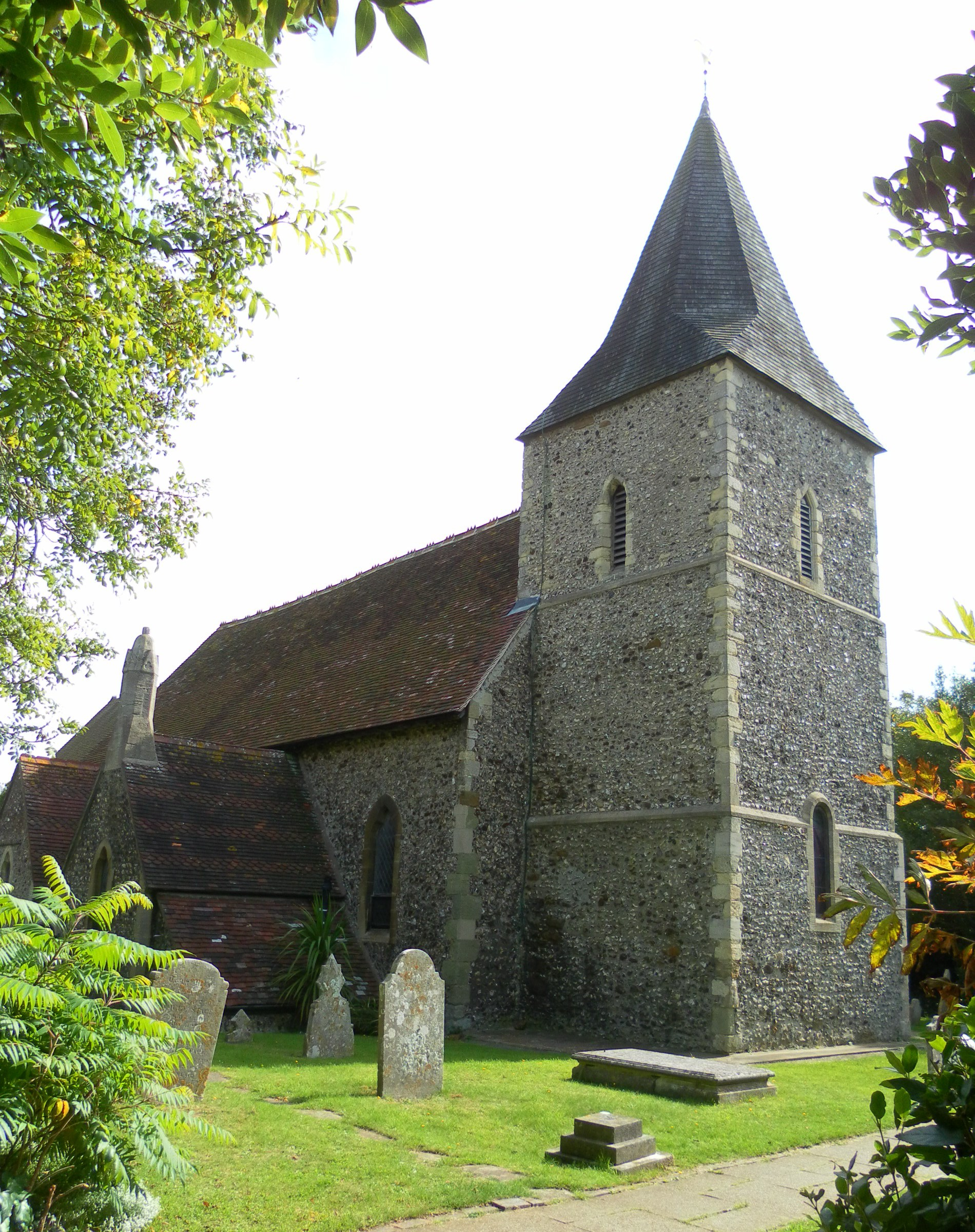
- St Peter's Church

- Location within East Sussex
- OS grid reference: TV485995
  - London: 67 miles (108 km) N
- Civil parish: Seaford
- District: Lewes
- Shire county: East Sussex
- Region: South East
- Country: England
- Sovereign state: United Kingdom
- Post town: SEAFORD
- Postcode district: BN25
- Dialling code: 01323
- Police: Sussex
- Fire: East Sussex
- Ambulance: South East Coast
- UK Parliament: Lewes

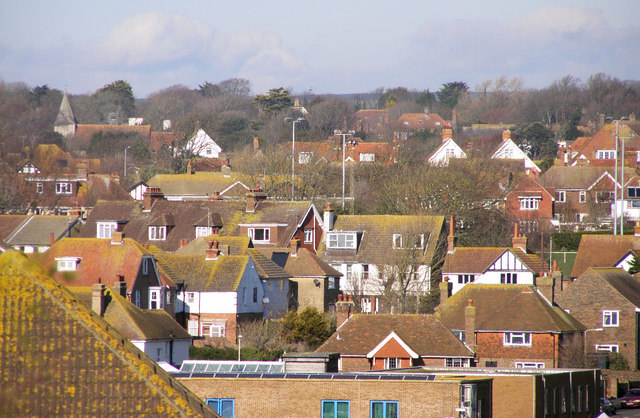

East Blatchington is a coastal village which has merged into the western part of Seaford, contiguous with Bishopstone, in the civil parish of Seaford, in the Lewes district, in the county of East Sussex, England. It is located near the abandoned village of Tide Mills.

== History ==
The area was settled by the Romans, who probably used it as a port to transfer goods to mainland Europe. The area was taken over by the Saxons after the Romans had left it. The village originally ran from the church to the duck pond.

Like Seaford and Newhaven, its western neighbour, East Blatchington was a front line coastal defence during the Napoleonic Wars, and had a military barracks built in 1794 and demolished after the Great War. In its early years, it was badly supplied, which resulted in 500 men mutinying and occupying Seaford. The townspeople gave them provisions and alcohol. The following day, the regular army, based at Newhaven overpowered them and arrested twenty mutineers. The leaders were executed and the others punished.

The barracks were lightly manned, until the First World War and became a staging post for soldiers fighting in France, who were shipped from Newhaven. After the war, the barracks were demolished.

St Peter's Parish Church dates back to about 1100 and the church registers date from 1563. The church has a memorial to pioneer balloonist Henry Tracey Coxwell.

Blatchington Pond was restored in 1980 and remains largely the same to this present day.

In 1951 the parish had a population of 2448. On 1 April 1974 the parish was abolished and became part of Seaford unparished area.

== Sport ==
The area has a seven court tennis club, called Seaford Lawn Tennis Club.

It is also nearby to one of the oldest golf clubs in Sussex, Seaford Golf Club.

== Transport ==
The A259 road runs through East Blatchington, with Brighton and Hove Bus routes 12 and 12A running between Brighton and Eastbourne.

The village is served by Bishopstone and Seaford railway stations, at the end of the Seaford branch line. All services are run by Southern to Brighton railway station.
