= Glacia =

Glacia may refer to:

== Pokémon characters ==
- Glacia (Pokémon), an Elite Four member
- Glaceon, (Japanese Glacia), it can freeze its own moisture

== See also ==
- Glacier, a persistent body of moving ice
