= Glaisher (crater) =

Crater on the Moon

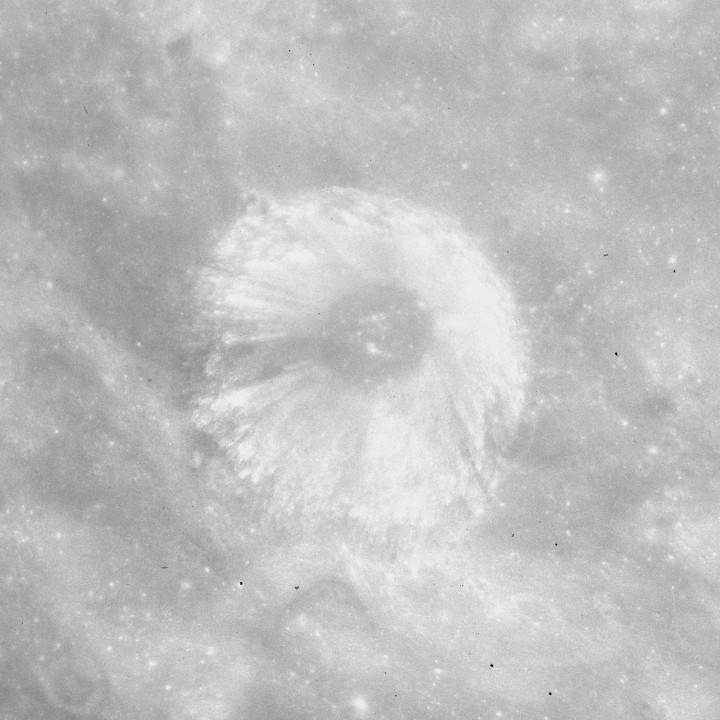
- Apollo 15 mapping camera image
- Coordinates: 13.2°N 49.5°E
- Diameter: 16 km
- Depth: 3.29 km
- Colongitude: 311° at sunrise
- Eponym: James Glaisher

Glaisher is a lunar impact crater that is located in the region of terrain that forms the southwest border of Mare Crisium. It lies to the southwest of the lava-flooded crater Yerkes, and west-northwest of the Greaves–Lick crater pair. It is surrounded by a ring of satellite craters of various dimensions, the larger companions generally being arranged to the south of Glaisher.

This crater is circular, with a bowl-shaped interior and a small floor at the midpoint. The crater has not been significantly worn by subsequent impacts. A merged, double-crater formation is attached to its southern rim, consisting of Glaisher E at the northwest end and Glaisher G to the southeast. The infrared spectrum of pure crystalline plagioclase has been identified on the north and west wall.

The crater was named after British meteorologist James Glaisher and its name was approved by the IAU in 1935.

== Satellite craters ==
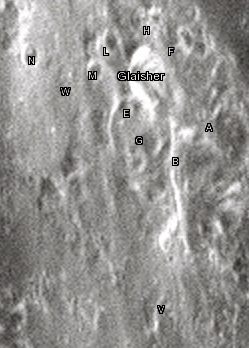
Glaisher crater and its satellite craters taken from Earth in 2012 at the University of Hertfordshire's Bayfordbury Observatory with the telescopes Meade LX200 14" and Lumenera Skynyx 2-1

By convention these features are identified on lunar maps by placing the letter on the side of the crater midpoint that is closest to Glaisher.

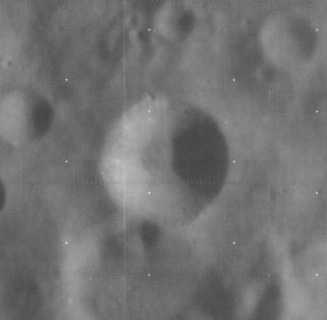
Lunar Orbiter 4 image. Glaisher F is in upper right, Glaisher H is near top center, Glaisher L is above left center, and part of Glaisher E is below Glaisher at center.

Glaisher	Latitude	Longitude	Diameter
A	12.9° N	50.7° E	19 km
B	12.6° N	50.1° E	18 km
E	12.7° N	49.2° E	21 km
F	13.7° N	50.0° E	7 km
G	12.4° N	49.5° E	20 km
H	13.8° N	49.6° E	5 km
L	13.4° N	48.8° E	7 km
M	13.1° N	48.6° E	5 km
N	13.1° N	47.5° E	7 km
V	11.1° N	49.9° E	12 km
W	12.4° N	47.6° E	46 km
