= Ice Age =

Ice Age or ice age most commonly refers to:

- Ice age, a long period of reduction in the temperature of the Earth's surface and atmosphere.

Ice Age may also refer to:

== Geological periods ==
- Late Cenozoic Ice Age, the current ice age, and geologic period of the last 33.9 million years
- Last Glacial Period, the most recent glacial period (115,000 to 11,700 years ago)
- Penultimate Glacial Period, the glacial period that occurred before the Last Glacial Period
- Little Ice Age, a period of relative cold in certain regions from roughly 1450 to 1480
- Pleistocene, a geologic epoch, often colloquially referred to as the "Ice Age", that includes the world's most recent repeated glaciations (2,580,000 to 11,700 years ago)
- Plio-Pleistocene, a geological pseudo-period
- Quaternary glaciation, the geologic period of the last 2.58 million years

== Television and film ==
- Ice Age (2002 film), the first film in the franchise
  - Ice Age: The Meltdown, a 2006 sequel
  - Ice Age: Dawn of the Dinosaurs, a 2009 sequel
  - Ice Age: A Mammoth Christmas, a 2011 TV special
  - Ice Age: Continental Drift, a 2012 sequel
  - Ice Age: The Great Egg-Scapade, a 2016 TV special
  - Ice Age: Collision Course, a 2016 sequel
  - The Ice Age Adventures of Buck Wild, a 2022 spin-off
  - Ice Age: Scrat Tales, a 2022 spinoff series
  - Ice Age: Boiling Point, an upcoming 2027 sequel
- Ice Age (1975 film), a West German drama film
- Ice Age (TV program), a Russian ice show
- Ice Age Giants, a BBC series

=== Episodes ===
- "Ice Age", Action Man episode 15 (1996)
- "Ice Age", Love, Death & Robots season 1, episode 16 (2019)
- "Ice Age", Mega Man season 1, episode 10 (1994)
- "Ice Age", The Lost World season 3, episode 11 (2002)
- "Ice Age", Time Bandits episode 7 (2024)

== Music ==
- Ice Age (band), an American progressive metal band formed in the 1990s
- Iceage, a Danish punk rock band formed in 2008
- Ice Ages (band), an Austrian dark electro music project
- "Ice Age" (How to Destroy Angels song), 2012
- "Ice Age" (Don Toliver song), 2024
- "Ice Age", a song by Band of Susans from The Word and the Flesh, 1991
- "Ice Age", a song by Denzel Curry from 32 Zel/Planet Shrooms, 2015
- "Ice Age", a song by Jefferson Airplane from Jefferson Airplane, 1989
- "Ice Age", a song by Joy Division from Still, 1981
- Ice Age Entertainment, an American record label

== Other uses ==
- Ice Age (franchise), an American media franchise
- Ice Age (video game), the name of several video games
- Ice Age (Magic: The Gathering), a block of sets for a collectible card game
- The Ice Age (novel), by Margaret Drabble, 1977

== See also ==
- Global cooling
