= James Whitbread Lee Glaisher =

English mathematician and astronomer

James Whitbread Lee Glaisher FRS FRSE FRAS
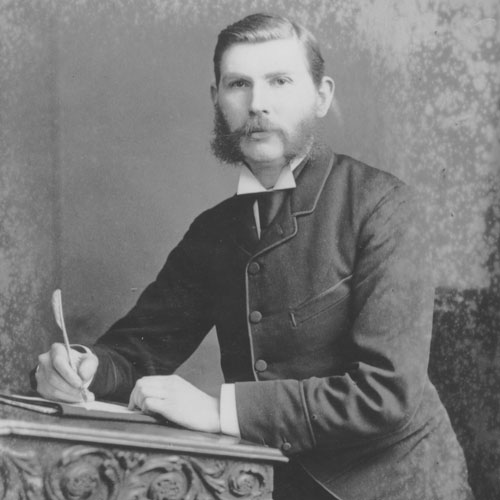
- Born: 5 November 1848; Lewisham, England
- Died: 7 December 1928 (aged 80); Cambridge
- Education: Trinity College, Cambridge
- Known for: Glaisher's theorem Glaisher–Kinkelin constant
- Scientific career
- Fields: Mathematics, Astronomy

James Whitbread Lee Glaisher (5 November 1848, in Lewisham — 7 December 1928, in Cambridge) was a prominent English mathematician and astronomer. He is known for Glaisher's theorem, an important result in the field of integer partitions, and for the Glaisher–Kinkelin constant, a number important in both mathematics and physics.

He was a passionate collector of English ceramics and valentines, much of which he bequeathed to the Fitzwilliam Museum in Cambridge.

== Life ==
He was born in Lewisham in Kent on 5 November 1848 the son of the eminent astronomer James Glaisher and his wife, Cecilia Louisa Belville. His mother was a noted photographer.

He was educated at St Paul's School from 1858. He became somewhat of a school celebrity in 1861 when he made two hot-air balloon ascents with his father to study the stratosphere.

He won a Campden Exhibition Scholarship allowing him to study at Trinity College, Cambridge, where he was second wrangler in 1871 and was made a Fellow of the college. Influential in his time on teaching at the University of Cambridge, he is now remembered mostly for work in number theory that anticipated later interest in the detailed properties of modular forms. He published widely over other fields of mathematics.

Glaisher was elected FRS in 1875. He was the editor-in-chief of Messenger of Mathematics. He was also the 'tutor' of the philosopher Ludwig Wittgenstein (tutor being a non-academic role in Cambridge University). He was president of the Royal Astronomical Society 1886–1888 and 1901–1903. When George Biddell Airy retired as Astronomer Royal in 1881 it is said that Glaisher was offered the post but declined.

He lived in a set of rooms at Trinity College, and while there was elected to honorary membership of the Manchester Literary and Philosophical Society in 1892.He died there on 7 December 1928.

He was a keen cyclist but preferred his penny-farthing to the newer "safety" bicycles. He was President of Cambridge University Cycling Club 1882 to 1885. He was a keen collector of English Delftware and other popular English pottery, much of it then below the notice of other collectors. The university indulged him by allowing him a room of the Fitzwilliam Museum to house his personal collection. He also amassed a collection of some 1,600 valentines, which he bequeathed to the museum.

== Awards ==
- Honorary doctorate (DSc) from the University of Dublin in 1892
- Honorary doctorate (DSc) from Manchester University in 1902
- Winner of the London Mathematical Society's De Morgan Medal in 1908
- Winner of the Royal Society's Sylvester Medal in 1913
- Fellow of the Royal Society in 1875 at the young age of 27

== Publications ==
Glaisher published over 400 articles on various topics, including astronomy, special functions, and number theory, and was editor and contributor to both the Messenger of Mathematics and the Quarterly Journal of Mathematics.
