= Henry Tracey Coxwell =

British aeronaut (1819–1900)

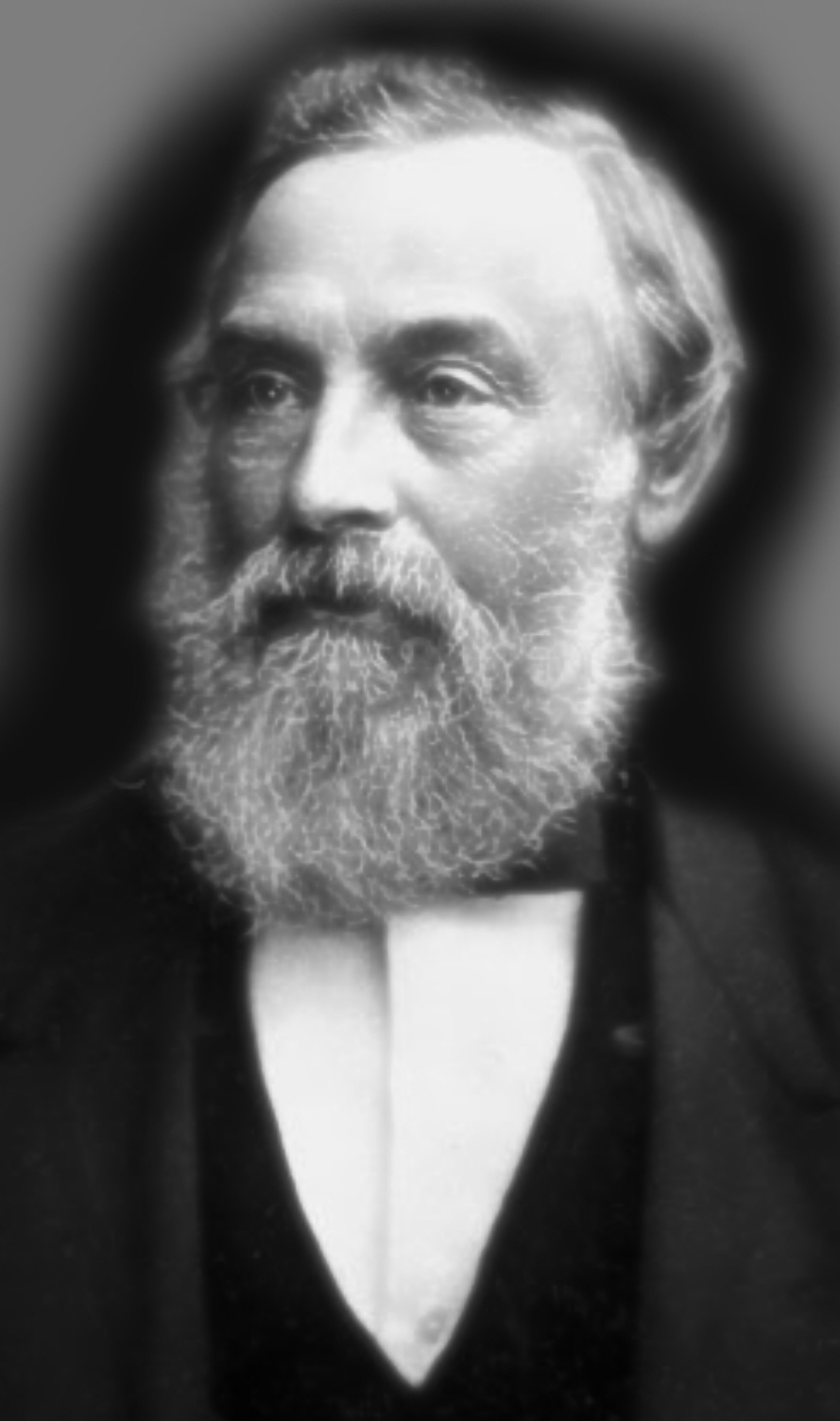
- Born: 2 March 1819; Wouldham
- Died: 5 January 1900 (aged 80); East Blatchington, East Sussex
- Occupation: Balloonist

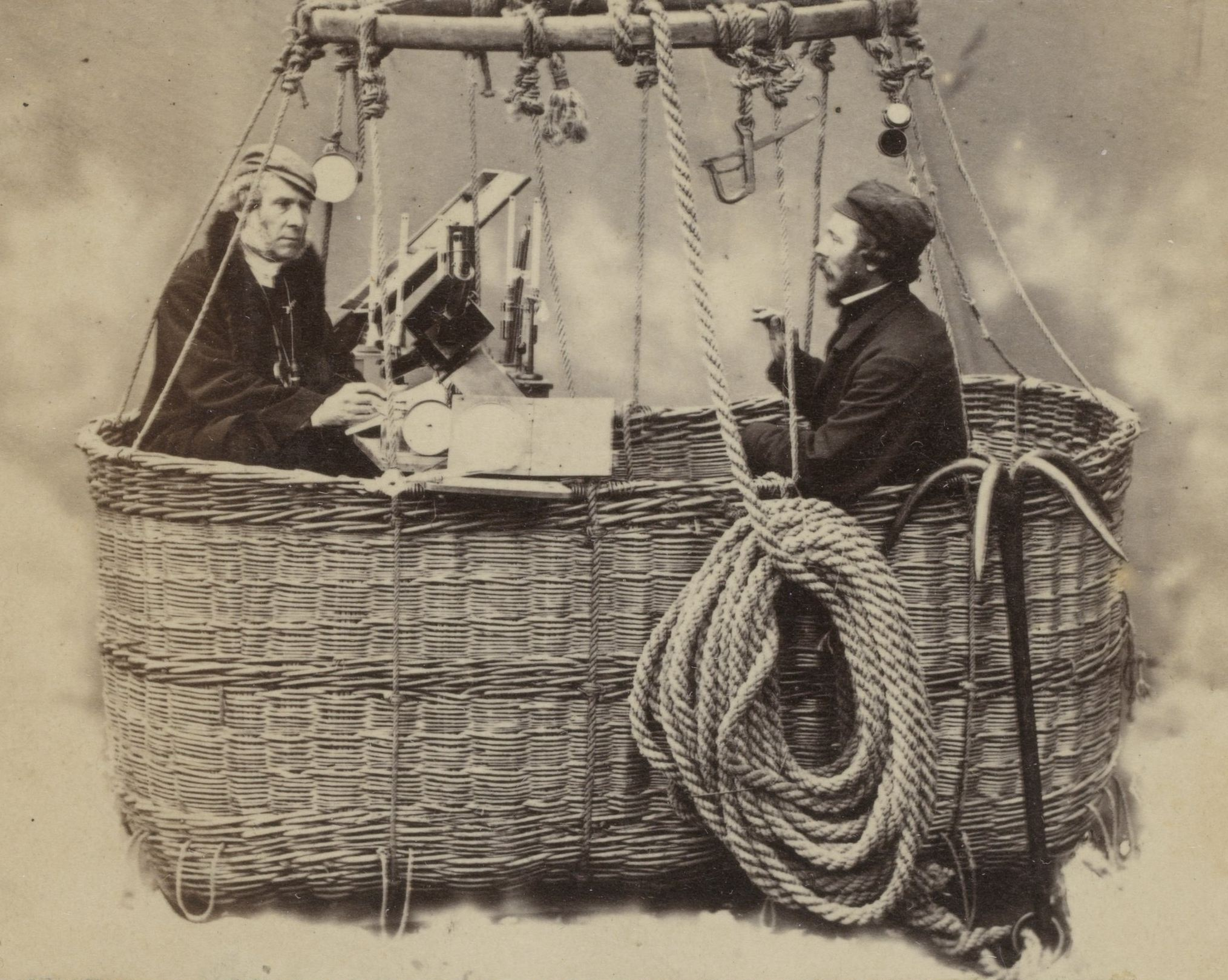
James Glaisher (left) and Henry Tracey Coxwell ballooning in 1864

Henry Tracey Coxwell (2 March 1819 – 5 January 1900) was an English aeronaut and writer about ballooning active over the British Isles and continental Europe in the mid-to late nineteenth century. His achievements included having established and led two military balloon companies in Cologne, Germany at the outbreak of the Franco-Prussian War in 1870, leading the first aerial trip in England for purposes of photography (with Henry Negretti in 1863), piloting a British Association flight from Wolverhampton, England that achieved a record altitude with James Glaisher in 1862, reaching at least 29,000 ft (8,800 m), and perhaps as high as 35,000 to 37,000 ft (10,700 to 11,300 m), as well as founding The Balloon, or Aerostatic Magazine (in 1845) and collecting his experiences in an autobiography, My Life and Balloon Experiences (from 1887 to 1890). He was referred to as the foremost balloonist of the last half of the nineteenth century by the English-language periodical, Illustrated London News, in January 1900.

== Life ==
Henry Tracey Coxwell was born at the parsonage at Wouldham, Kent, on 2 March 1819. He was the youngest son of Commander Joseph Coxwell of the Royal Navy, and grandson of the Rev. Charles Coxwell of Ablington House, Gloucestershire. He went to school at Chatham, where his family moved in 1822. He later became a dentist and by age 25, had made his first flight in a balloon.

As a boy he had become interested in balloons, and he spared no efforts to witness as many ascents as possible; among the aeronauts he admired and envied as a boy were Mrs Graham, Charles Green, Robert Cocking and the parachutist John Hampton. The successful voyage of Green's balloon from Vauxhall Gardens to Germany stimulated his enthusiasm, but it was not until 19 August 1844, at Pentonville, that he had an opportunity of making an ascent.

In the autumn of 1845 he founded and edited The Balloon, or Aerostatic Magazine, of which about twelve numbers were ultimately printed at irregular intervals. In 1847 he made a night flight from Vauxhall Gardens with Albert Smith during a storm: a 16 ft (4.9 m) rent appeared in the envelope, and the balloon fell rapidly to earth, the occupants being saved by the balloon catching on some scaffolding before hitting the ground. Undeterred, Coxwell made another flight the following week.

Coxwell became a professional balloonist in 1848, when he was entrusted with the management of a balloon, the Sylph, in Brussels, and subsequently made ascents at Antwerp, Elberfeld, Cologne, and Johannisberg in Prussia; in 1849 he exhibited his balloon at Kroll's Gardens, Berlin, and demonstrated the ease with which petards could be discharged in the air; in September he made excursions to Stettin, Breslau, and Hamburg. At Hanover, in the summer of 1850, he had a narrow escape, owing to the proximity of lofty trees, and during this year and the next he took up many passengers at Berlin, Prague, Vienna, Leipzig, and elsewhere.

In 1852 he returned to London and made ascents from Cremorne Gardens, the New Globe Gardens in the Mile End Road and the Pavilion Gardens in Woolwich. In September 1854 he made some demonstrations in signalling from a balloon at Surrey Gardens.

=== The historic flight ===
In 1862 the British Association for the Advancement of Science determined to make investigations of the upper atmosphere using balloons. Dr. James Glaisher, FRS, was chosen to carry out the experiments, and at the suggestion of Charles Green, Coxwell was employed to fly the balloons. Coxwell constructed a 93,000 cu ft (2,600 m^{3}) capacity balloon named the Mammoth, the largest as of that date. For their third flight, on 5 September 1862, they took off from Wolverhampton, the location of a coal gas manufacturing facility. Coxwell used this type of gas because it was safer than hydrogen, although it provided less lift.

Coxwell and Glaisher reached the greatest height achieved as of that date. Glaisher lost consciousness during the ascent, his last barometer reading indicating an altitude of 29,000 ft (8,800 m) and Coxwell lost all sensation in his hands. The valve-line had become entangled so he was unable to release the mechanism; he climbed onto the rigging and was finally able to release the vent with his teeth before losing consciousness. This enabled the balloon to descend to a lower altitude.

The balloon dropped nineteen thousand feet in fifteen minutes, landing safely near Ludlow. Later calculations estimated their maximum altitude at 35,000 to 37,000 ft (10,700 to 11,300 m).

=== Subsequent years ===
Between September 1862 and 1866, Coxwell and Glaisher made additional ascents to make scientific measurements.

In 1863 Coxwell made a demonstration of ballooning to the Army at Aldershot. These had little practical outcome, although later the War Office did order a balloon from Coxwell with the intention of shipping it to Ghana for use in the Third Anglo-Ashanti War. However, the practicalities of supplying hydrogen under field conditions resulted in the cancellation of the project.

In 1863, in company with Henry Negretti, Coxwell made the first aerial trip in England for purposes of photography. In 1864–1865, in the Research, he made some very successful ascents in Ireland, and gave some lectures upon aerostation. In 1864 his balloon, Britannia, was destroyed during the Leicester balloon riot. When the Franco-Prussian War broke out in 1870 he went to manage some war-balloons for the Germans. He formed two companies, two officers, and forty-two men, at Cologne, and his assistant went on to Strasbourg, but the town surrendered before much service was rendered.

On 17 June 1885, he made his last ascent in a large balloon, the City of York. He had made an annual display at York for several years, and there he bade farewell to a profession of which he had been one of the most daring exponents for over forty years. His immunity from serious accidents was due to his instinctive prudence, but still more to his thorough knowledge of ballooning tackle. In 1887 he arranged for publication of a book detailing his career, My Life and Balloon Experiences.

Coxwell had a balloon factory in Richmond Road Seaford, Sussex.

After his retirement, Coxwell lived for a time at Tottenham, but later moved to Seaford, East Sussex. He died on 5 January 1900, in Lewes, Sussex, England. He has a memorial at St Peter's Church, East Blatchington, Seaford, and is buried in Seaford Cemetery.

== Works ==
During 1887-1889 Coxwell collected together in two volumes a number of interesting but ill-arranged and confusing chapters upon his career as an aeronaut, to which he gave the title My Life and Balloon Experiences; to vol. i. is added a supplementary chapter on military ballooning. As a frontispiece is a photographic portrait, reproduced in the Illustrated London News (13 January 1900) as that of the foremost balloonist of the last half-century.

He says:

I had hammered away in The Times for little less than a decade before there was a real military trial of ballooning for military purposes at Aldershot.

== In popular culture ==
The Aeronauts, released in 2019, includes a fictionalized account of the 5 September 1862 flight, but omits Coxwell entirely. The movie replaces him with a female co-star, played by Felicity Jones; Amelia Wren is a fictional composite character, based on several real-life balloonists and adventurers. A report in The Daily Telegraph quotes Keith Moore, Head of Library at the Royal Society (Royal Society of London for Improving Natural Knowledge), as saying, "It’s a great shame that Henry isn’t portrayed because he performed very well and saved the life of a leading scientist". There is a young boy in the film who is quite keen on ballooning, and has absolutely nothing to do with Coxwell.

== Bibliography ==
- This article incorporates text from a publication now in the public domain: Seccombe, Thomas (1901). "Coxwell, Henry". In Lee, Sidney (ed.). Dictionary of National Biography (1st supplement). London: Smith, Elder & Co.
- Coxwell, Henrt (1887). My life and balloon experiences. London: W. H. Allen. and here on Wikimedia Commons My life and balloon experiences, with a supplementary chapter on military ballooning
- Holmes, Richard (2013). Falling Upwards. London: Collins. ISBN 978-0-00-738692-5.
- Coxwell's historic high ascent with James Glaisher is discussed in Jennifer Tucker (1996) "Voyages of Discovery on Oceans of Air: The Image of Science in an Age of ‘Balloonacy,’" Osiris' Volume 11: "Science in the Field" (1996): 144–176; When Victorian Scientists Caught Ballomania; and

Jennifer Tucker, "The True History of the Aeronauts Who Transformed our View of the World Above," 'Smithsonian Magazine'Dec. 9, 2019.

Preceded by Charles Green and George Rush	Human altitude record 1862-1901; With: James Glaisher	Succeeded by Arthur Berson and Reinhard Süring
