= Quarterly Journal of Mathematics =

- Discipline: Mathematics
- Language: English
- Edited by: A. Lauder, B. Szendroi

Publication details
- History: 1930-present
- Publisher: Oxford University Press
- Frequency: Quarterly
- Open access: Hybrid
- Impact factor: 0.681 (2020)

Standard abbreviations
- ISO 4: Q. J. Math.

Indexing
- CODEN: QJMAAT
- ISSN: 0033-5606 (print); 1464-3847 (web)
- LCCN: 36011635
- OCLC no.: 41981614

Links
- Journal homepage; Online access; Online archive

The Quarterly Journal of Mathematics is a quarterly peer-reviewed mathematics journal established in 1930 from the merger of The Quarterly Journal of Pure and Applied Mathematics and the Messenger of Mathematics. According to the Journal Citation Reports, the journal has a 2020 impact factor of 0.681.
