= Kodigo Norte =

Spanish rap music group

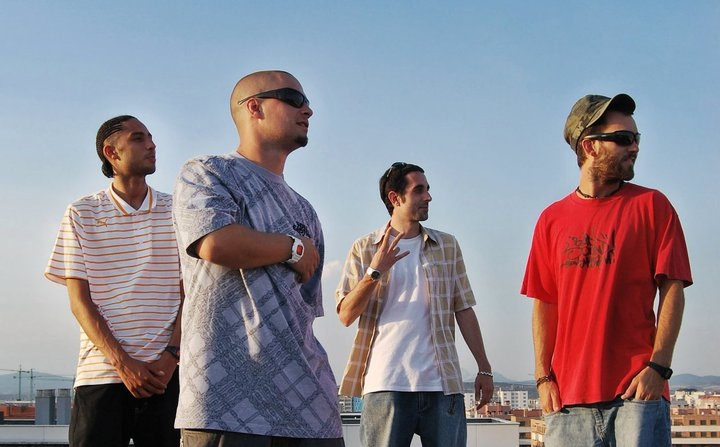

Background information
- Origin: Vitoria-Gasteiz, Basque country, Spain
- Genres: Hip hop, rap, reggae, dancehall
- Years active: 2004–present
- Members: Gorka Suaia; Markés; Sok; DJ Loro

Kodigo Norte (a satiric misspelling of the Spanish phrase "codigo norte", or "northern code") is a Rap music group formed in 2004 in Vitoria-Gasteiz, Spain. Its members are DJ Loro, Markés, Sok and Gorka Suaia. Their songs are performed in the Spanish and Basque languages. Each member had been a part of the Vitoria hip hop scene since the late 1990s. Sok and Markés worked together previously in a different rap group. After that group was dissolved, the two founded Kodigo Norte. Band member Markés started a solo project called "Un Paseo por Mi Mente" in 2005, collaborating with other Kodigo Norte members.

Kodigo Norte's music blends classic late 1990s New York hip hop with reggae, occasionally adding elements of dance hall music. They perform mostly in Spain, concentrating on the Basque Country. The band performed in international festivals such as Zaragoza Ciudad Hip Hop Festival and Hip Hop Arena, sharing the stage with artists such as Wu Tang Clan, DITC, Big Daddy Kane, Chiens DePalle, Sniper, The Visionaries and DJ Revolution.

== History ==
Kodigo Norte was founded in 2004 by DJ Loro, Gorka Suaia, Markés and Sok, all of whom had been members of groups in and around Vitoria-Gasteiz. Their first concert was in September 2004. In 2005, Markés released a solo work: "Un Paseo por Mi Mente", which rose to number 68 in the January 2006 edition of Hip Hop Nation magazine. "Un Paseo" appeared on a compilation album edited by El Diablo called MP3RAP volume 2. At the same time, the group began to perform in different parts of Basque Country.

In March 2006, the group released its eponymous first album, "Kodigo Norte." The album was well received and won the demo competition of 2006 in Alava. The group began to perform outside of Basque Country.

In early 2007, the band returned to Vitoria-Gasteiz to record, mix and master a new EP titled Iceberg in the Sonora Studio. Iceberg was released in March 2007.

In 2009, Markés collaborated with Sok, Gorka Suaia and others to release a new album, Independencia.

In 2010, Kodigo Norte produced the single "One Love One Shot" and released it with a music video. This became their most-watched video with more than 174,000 YouTube hits.

In December 2011, the group released its most recent album, Sutan Blai, a mix with three songs that they performed before a live audience in January 2012 at the Jimmy Jazz room in Vitoria-Gasteiz.

== Members ==
- DJ Loro (DJ) Israel Carreras (1981)
- Gorka Suaia (MC): Gorka Gamiz (1982)
- Markés (MC): Víctor Cruz (1982)
- Sok (MC): Mikel Brandao (1982)

== Discography ==
- 2011: Sutan Blai
- 2010: One Love / One Shot
- 2009: Independencia – Markés
- 2008: Friends and family – DJ Loro
- 2007: Iceberg EP
- 2006: Kodigo Norte
- 2005: Un Paseo por Mi Mente – Markes
