= Ruth Belville =

English "time seller" (1854–1943)

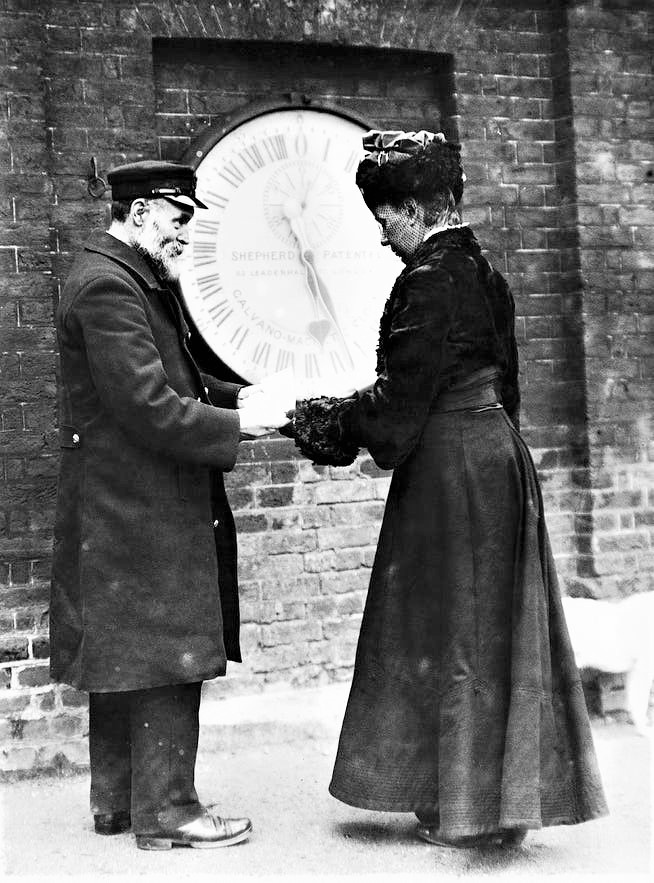
Ruth Belville outside the gates of the Greenwich Observatory, 1908

Elizabeth Ruth Naomi Belville (5 March 1854 – 7 December 1943), also known as the Greenwich Time Lady, was a businesswoman from London. She, her mother Maria Elizabeth, and her father John Henry, sold people the time. This was done by setting Belville's watch to Greenwich Mean Time, as shown by the Greenwich clock, each day and then "selling" people the time by letting them look at the watch and adjust theirs.

== History ==
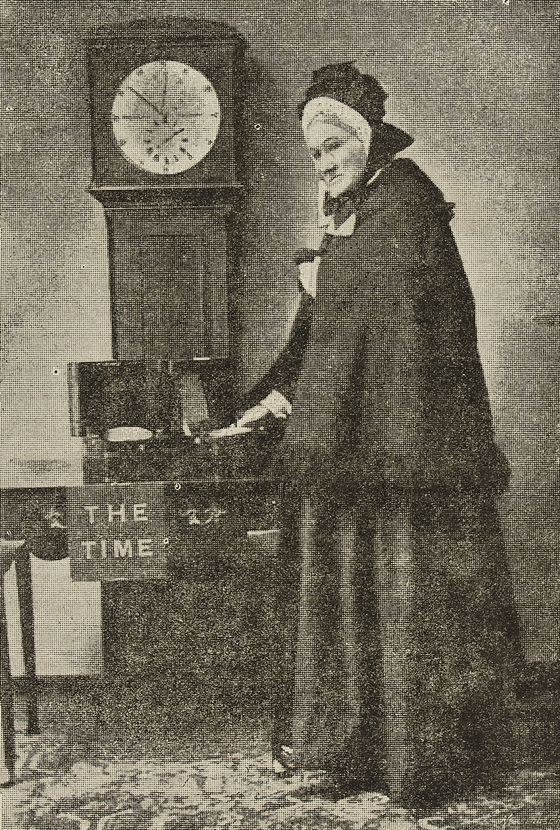
Maria Belville, 1892

Ruth Belville's father, John Henry Belville (1795–1856), created a service for 200 clients in 1836. Each morning, John Henry went to Greenwich Observatory, where he worked and set his watch to Greenwich Mean Time. He would then set off in his buggy and would set the clocks correctly for clients subscribed to the service.

John Henry continued this service until his death in 1856. His widow, Maria, was granted the privilege of carrying on the work as a means of livelihood and continued the business until her retirement in 1892 when she was in her eighties. Ruth Belville then took over the business. She continued the business until 1940. Belville charged approximately £4 per year (equivalent to £407 in 2023) for her services, cheaper than the Post Office time subscription of £15. Belville was in her eighties when she retired. At the age of 86 she was still able to journey about twelve miles from her home and attend at the Observatory by 9 a.m. She died at the age of 89.

== Competition ==
Belville's business came under attack in 1908 from St John Wynne, a director of the Standard Time Company, which sold a telegraphic time signal service and was Belville's main competitor. Wynne made a speech at the city United Wards Club attacking Belville, claiming "that her [Belville's] methods were amusingly out of date"; he also implied that she "might have been using her femininity to gain business."

The speech was published in The Times newspaper, but the article did not mention the Standard Time Company or that Wynne was Belville's competitor. Following the publication of the comments, Belville was besieged by reporters interested in her business and also the possible scandal implied by Wynne's comments. Belville managed to cope, and the resulting publicity resulted in an increase in sales. Belville said that all Wynne had managed to do was to give her free advertising.

== Arnold watch ==
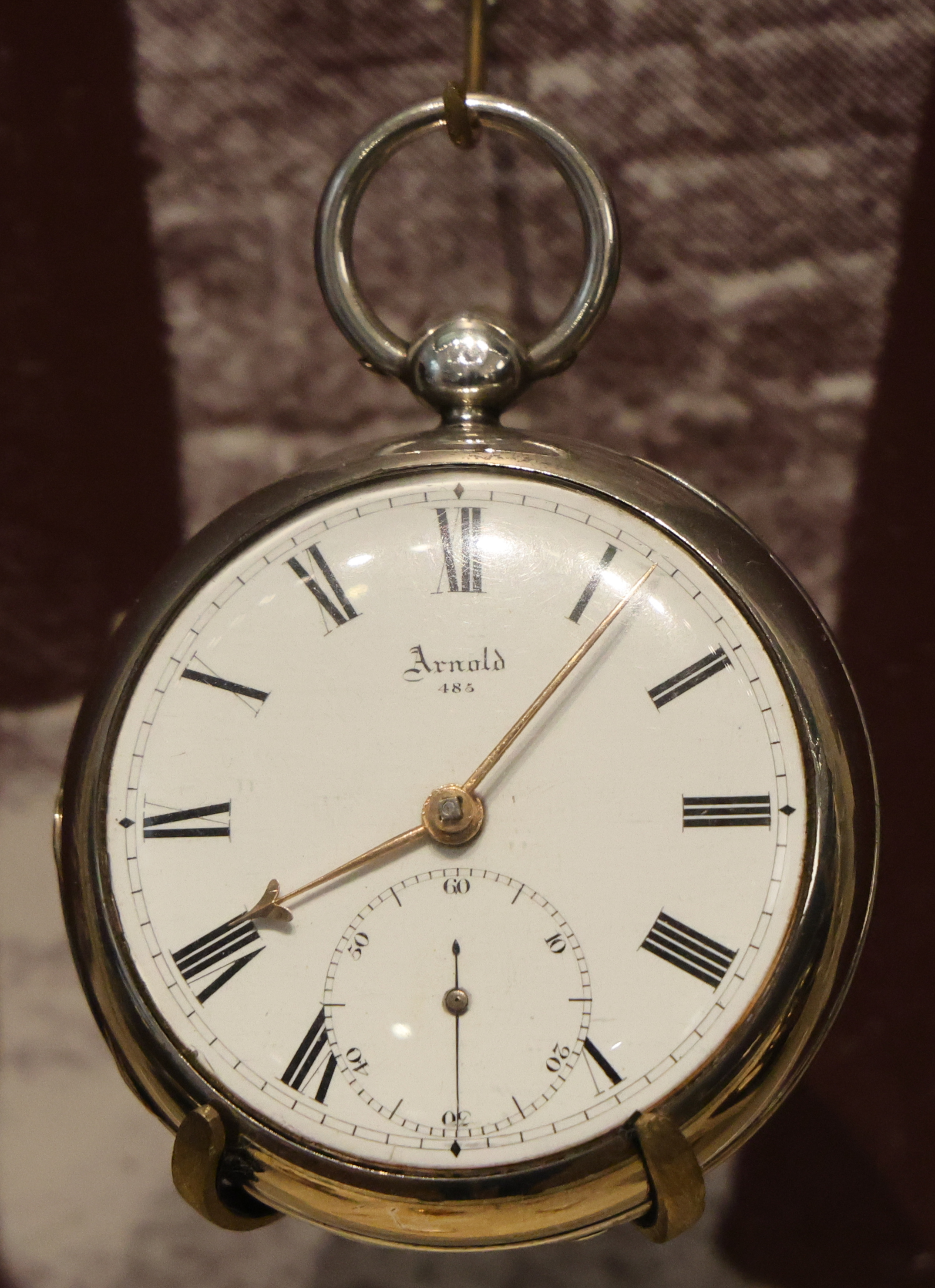
Watch by John Arnold used by Belville

The watch used by the business was a 1794 John Arnold pocket chronometer No. 485/786, which Ruth Belville called "Mr. Arnold". It had been made, with a gold case, for the Duke of Sussex, who rejected it because it "looked like a bedpan". When it was given to John Henry, he changed the case to silver because he was worried thieves might steal a gold watch. When Ruth died, the watch was left to the Worshipful Company of Clockmakers. The watch was substantially rebuilt c.1840.

The watch measures 78 mm (3.1 in) x 56 mm (2.2 in) x 25 mm (0.98 in). It is a spring detent escapement watch.
