= James Glaisher =

English meteorologist and astronomer

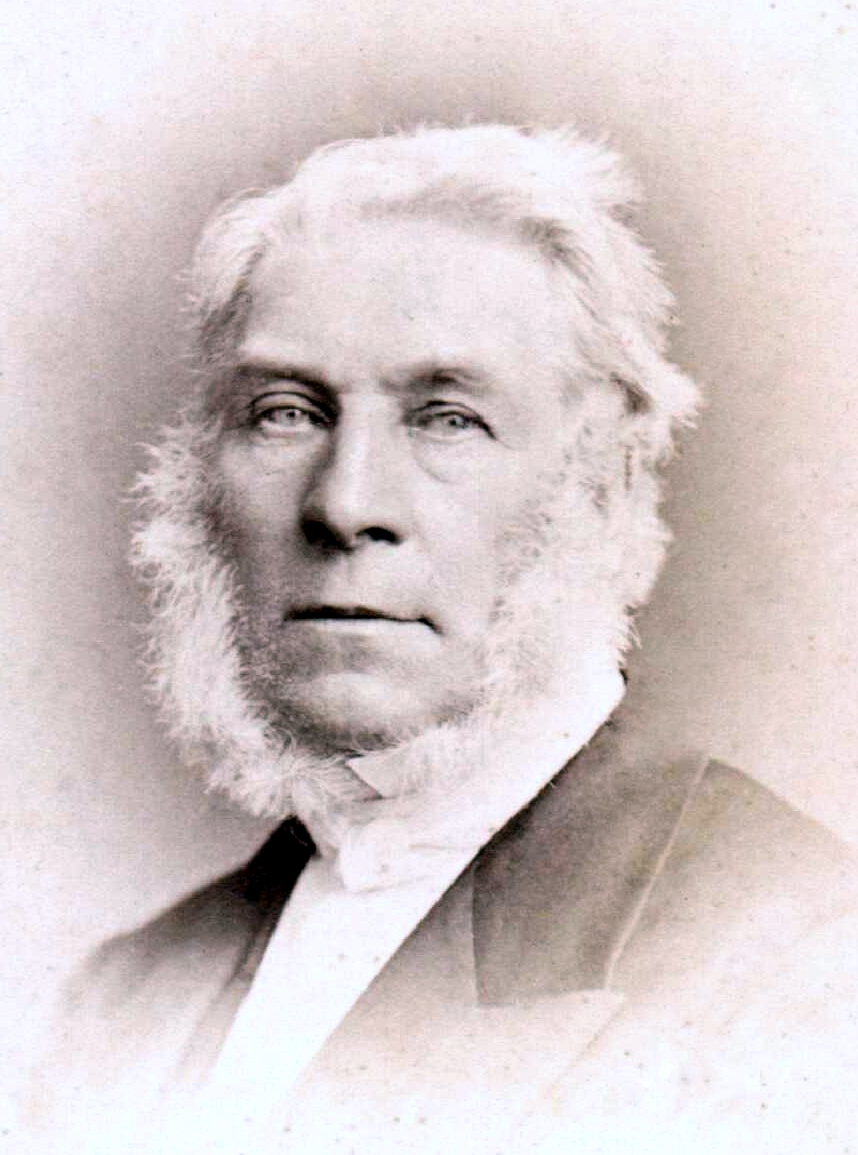
- Born: 7 April 1809; Rotherhithe, London, England
- Died: 7 February 1903 (aged 93); Croydon, Surrey, England
- Spouse: Cecilia Louisa Belville (m. 1843)
- Children: 3 (incl. James)
- Scientific career
- Fields: Meteorology

James Glaisher FRS (7 April 1809 – 7 February 1903) was an English meteorologist, aeronaut and astronomer.

== Biography ==
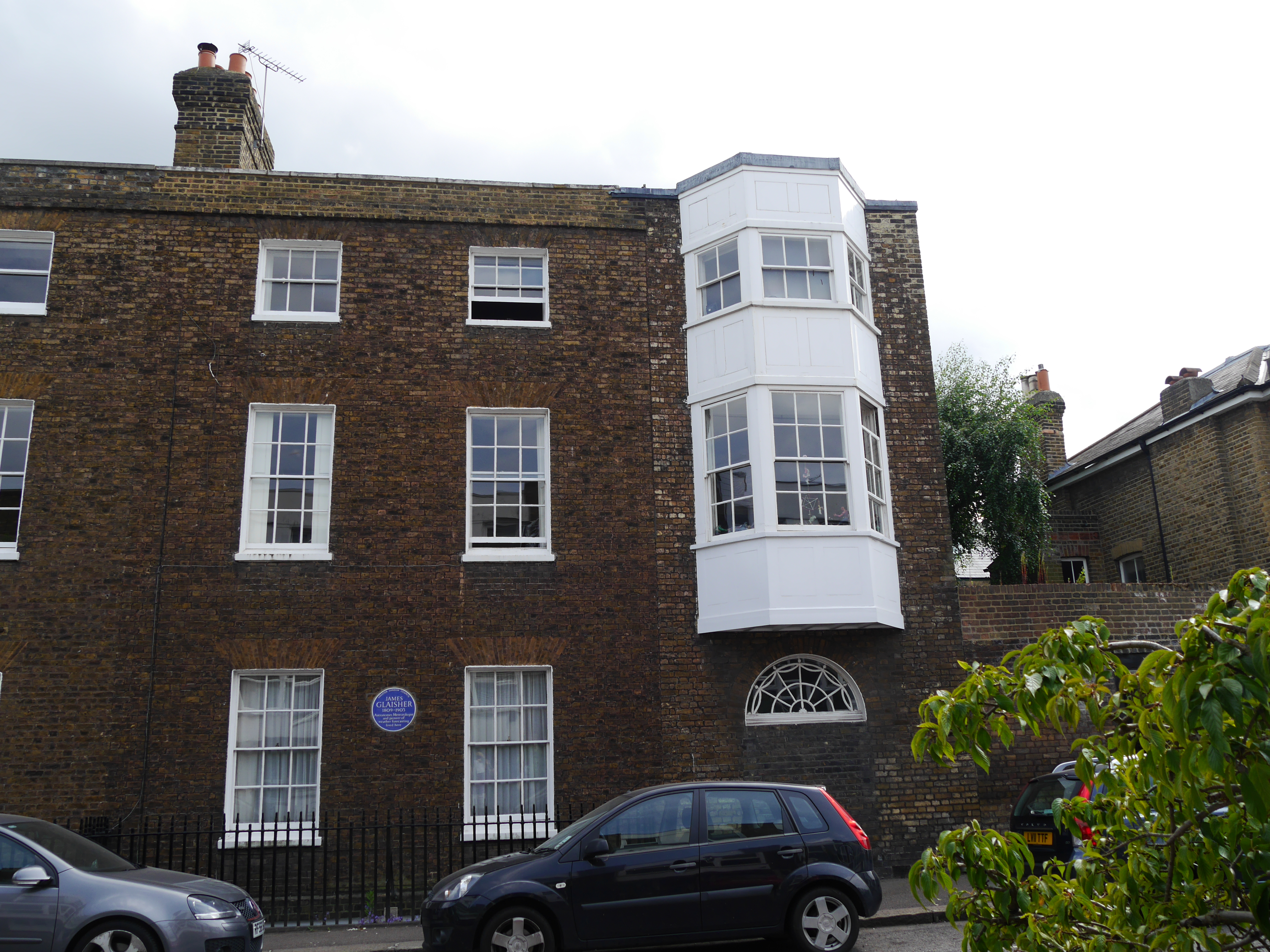
Glaisher's home at 20 Dartmouth Hill, London

Born in Rotherhithe, the son of a London watchmaker, Glaisher was a junior assistant at the Cambridge Observatory from 1833 to 1835 before moving to the Royal Observatory, Greenwich, where he served as Superintendent of the Department of Meteorology and Magnetism at Greenwich for 34 years.

In 1845, Glaisher published his dew point tables for the measurement of humidity. He was elected a Fellow of the Royal Society in June 1849.

He was a founding member of the Meteorological Society (1850) and the Aeronautical Society of Great Britain (1866). He was president of the Royal Meteorological Society from 1867 to 1868. Glaisher was elected a member of The Photographic Society, later the Royal Photographic Society, in 1854 and served as the society's president for 1869–1874 and 1875–1892. He remained a member until his death. He was also President of the Royal Microscopical Society. He is most famous as a pioneering balloonist. Between 1862 and 1866, usually with Henry Tracey Coxwell as his co-pilot, Glaisher made numerous ascents to measure the temperature and humidity of the atmosphere at the greatest altitudes attainable at that time.

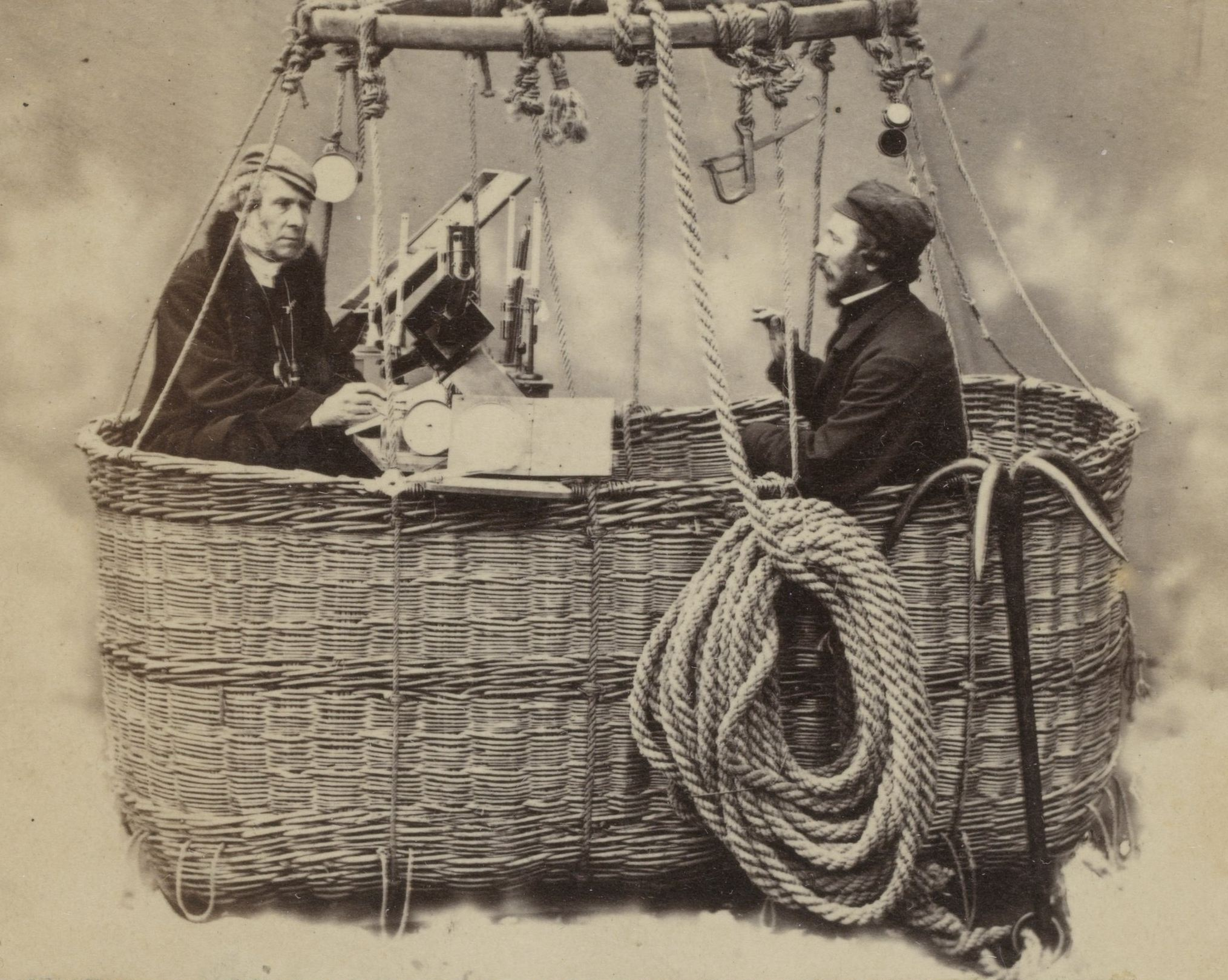
James Glaisher (left) and Henry Tracey Coxwell Ballooning in 1864

Their ascent on 5 September 1862 broke the world record for altitude but he passed out around 8,800 metres (28,900 feet) before a reading could be taken. One of the pigeons making the trip with him died. Estimates suggest that he rose to more than 9,500 metres (31,200 feet) and as much as 10,900 metres (35,800 feet) above sea level. Glaisher lost consciousness during the ascent and Coxwell lost all sensation in his hands. The valve-line had become entangled so he was unable to release the mechanism; with great effort, he climbed onto the rigging and was finally able to release the vent before losing consciousness. This allowed the balloon to descend to a lower altitude.

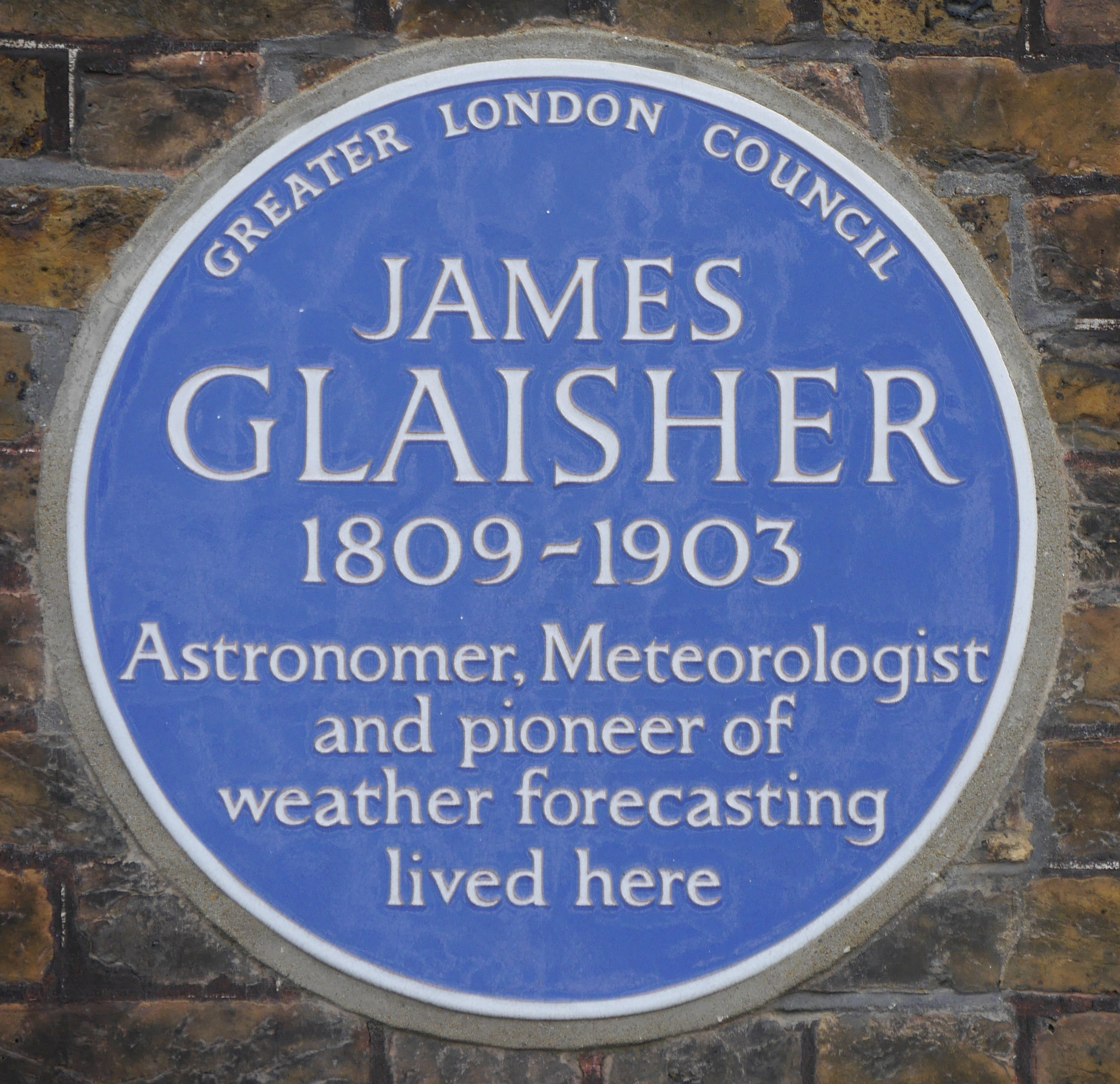
Plaque at Glaisher's home

Glaisher lived at 20 Dartmouth Hill, Blackheath, London, where there is a blue plaque in his memory.

The two made additional flights. According to the Smithsonian Institution, Glaisher "brought along delicate instruments to measure the temperature, barometric pressure and chemical composition of the air. He even recorded his own pulse at various altitudes".

In 1871, Glaisher arranged for the publication of his book about the balloon flights, Travels in the Air, a collection of reports from his experiments. To ensure that numerous members of the general public would learn from his experiences, he included "detailed drawings and maps, colorful accounts of his adventures and vivid descriptions of his precise observations", according to one report.

Glaisher was elected to the American Philosophical Society in 1895.

He died in Croydon, Surrey in 1903, aged 93.

== Family ==
In 1843 he married Cecilia Louisa Belville, a daughter of Henry Belville, Assistant at the Royal Observatory, Greenwich. James and Cecilia had two sons: Ernest Glaisher and the mathematician James Whitbread Lee Glaisher (1848–1928), and one daughter: Cecilia Appelina (1845–1932).

== Recognition ==
A lunar crater is named after him. The name was approved by the IAU in 1935.

== In popular culture ==
The Aeronauts, released in 2019, includes a fictionalised account of the 5 September 1862 flight. The film depicts fictional pilot Amelia Wren (played by Felicity Jones), joining Glaisher (played by Eddie Redmayne) in an epic fight for survival while attempting to make discoveries in a gas balloon. The film omits Henry Coxwell entirely with Wren becoming the pilot.

A report in The Daily Telegraph quotes Keith Moore, Head of Library at the Royal Society as saying: "It’s a great shame that Henry isn’t portrayed because he performed very well and saved the life of a leading scientist".

== Notes ==
Preceded by Charles Green and George Rush	Human altitude record 1862-1901; With: Henry Tracey Coxwell	Succeeded by Arthur Berson and Reinhard Süring
