= Container (skydiving) =

Backpack portion of a skydiving parachute system

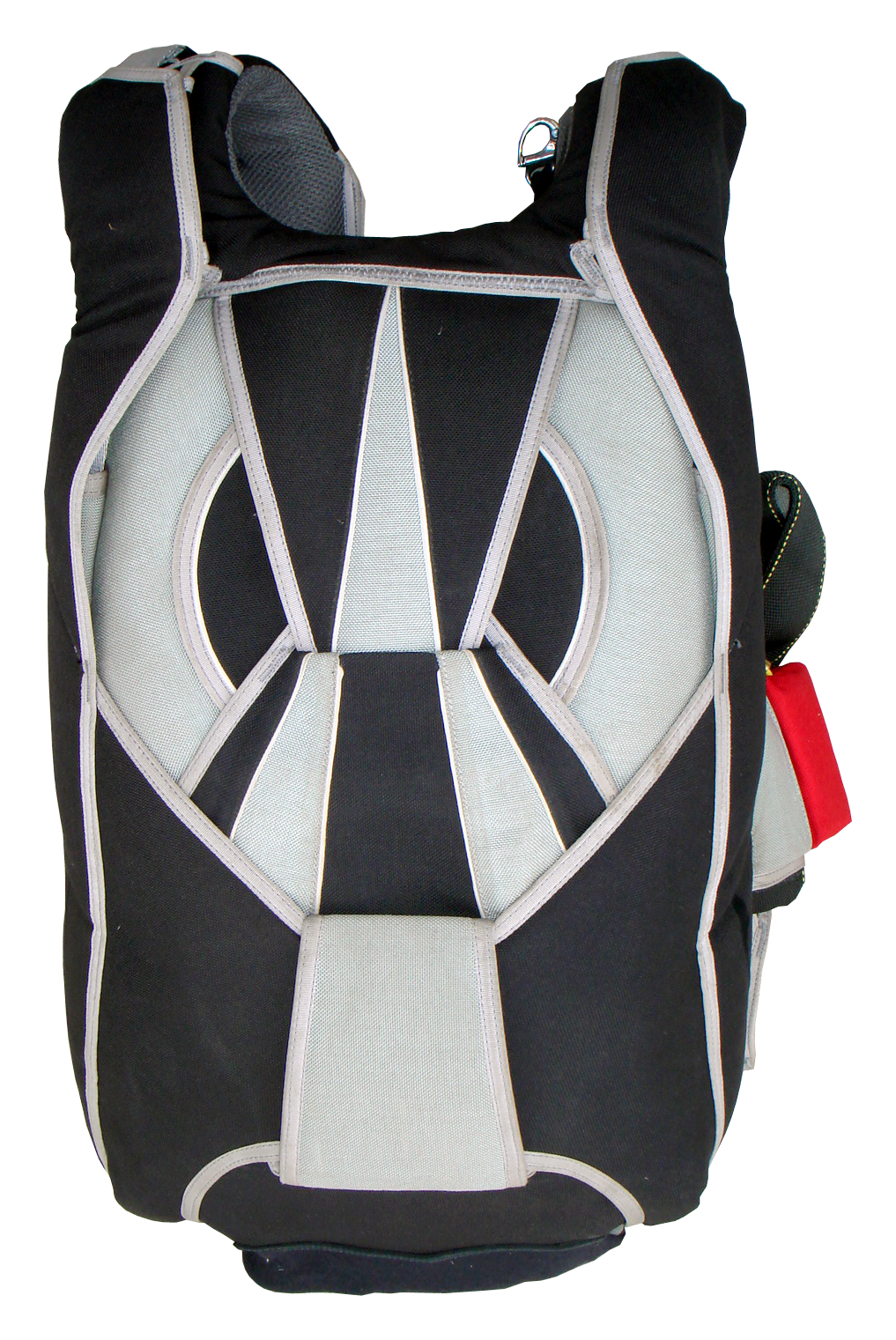
Back of a parachute container

In skydiving, the container refers to the backpack portion of the "harness-and-container system" containing the main parachute (often called a "canopy"), the reserve canopy, and the suspension system connecting the container to the canopy.

In sport skydiving, integrated into the front of the container is the harness which attaches to the jumper, and the reserve static line (RSL), while inside the rear are the automatic activation device (AAD) (often referred to by the generonyms "CYPRES" or "Vigil") connected to the reserve chute in case of a malfunction, the main assisted reserve deployment (MARD) (often referred to by the generonym "Skyhook", developed by Bill Booth), the main canopy, connected finally via the "bridle" to a pilot chute which typically sits in a "bottom of container" (BOC) pouch.

Altogether, including both the harness and container with all of its contents, the system is often referred to as one's skydiving "rig."
