= Malfunction (parachuting) =

Failure of a parachuting device

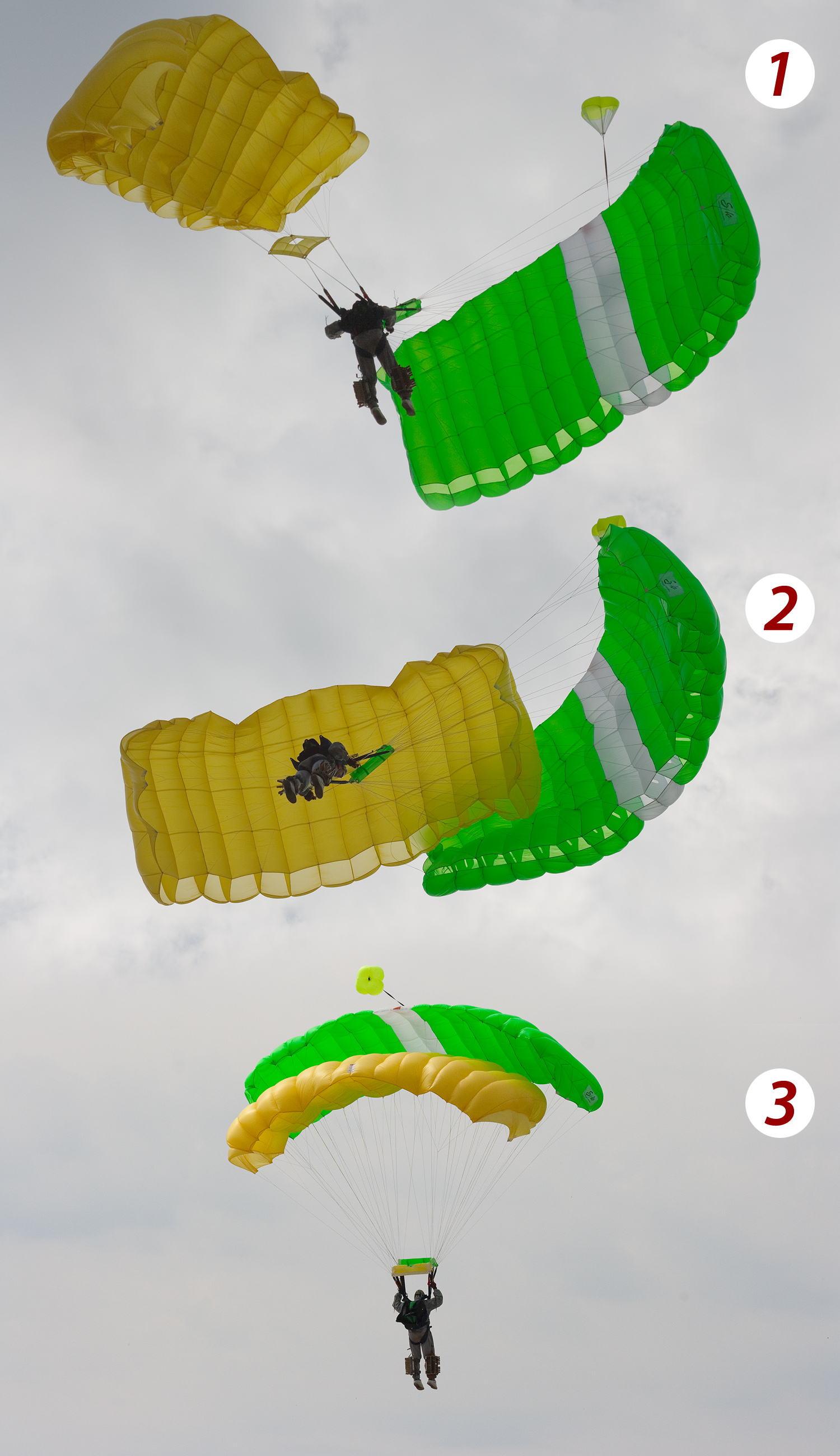
1: At about 100 m reserve canopy suddenly unpacks and opens 2: Skydiver decides not to cut away the main canopy, because there is a risk the main will tangle with the reserve. Reserve canopy goes forward and strikes the main canopy. 3: Skydiver fights for main canopy. Main and reserve canopies assume biplane position (one of two possible positions where both canopies can work together).

A malfunction is a partial or total failure of a parachuting device to operate as intended. Malfunctions may require a skydiver to cut away their main parachute and deploy the reserve parachute.

== High-speed malfunctions ==
=== Pilot chute in tow ===
This happens with the popular throw-out deployment system either when pitching the pilot chute does not successfully pull the closing pin to open the container, or, once opened, if the pilot chute does not exert enough force to extract the deployment bag out of the container. Several possible causes exist, such as:

- Kill line issues: it can be caused by pilot chutes with kill lines that have not been cocked properly and optimally during packing, or where the kill line has shrunken due to the heat of friction generated through use, reducing the drag of the pilot chute.
- Bridle: It can be caused by a mis-routed pilot chute bridle.
- Size incompatibility of bag versus container: a deployment bag and canopy too large for the container can cause it, as deployment bags should be properly matched to the container.

The correct procedure with this malfunction is to deploy the reserve from a stable belly down position. If time permits, the skydiver might first attempt to bump their container to dislodge a trapped deployment bag. If this malfunction is temporary and clears, it is called a pilot chute hesitation.

=== Bag lock ===
This malfunction occurs when the deployment bag is extracted from the main container, but fails to release the canopy within. The correct procedure to handle the malfunction is to cut away the main and deploy the reserve.

=== Horseshoe ===
A "horseshoe" describes a malfunction where a parachute deploys, but remains attached to a skydiver by its risers and at least one other point. This prevents the canopy from opening properly and the canopy and lines form a horseshoe shape extending from the risers up and then back down again to the other point where the parachute remains attached to or entangled with the skydiver. This malfunction may occur when the closing pin of a skydiving rig is released from the closing loop and allows the deployment bag to separate from the container. Because the pilot chute is still stowed, the malfunction takes on the shape of a horseshoe. This malfunction may also occur if the pilot chute or bridle connecting the pilot chute to the canopy becomes entangled with the skydiver. It is possible, though rare, to experience this type of malfunction when one or more parachute lines entangle with or snag on some portion of the parachute rig.

==== Procedures for clearing a horseshoe malfunction ====
The skydiver may attempt to extract the pilot chute or clear the entanglement. Extracting the pilot chute, while simple during the course of a normal jump, becomes a new challenge, because its location will have shifted due to the deployment of the main canopy. Skydivers may wish to practice on the ground deploying their pilot chute with the main canopy out of the container in order to gain experience with this procedure. If successfully cleared, the main parachute will likely fail to deploy correctly due to severe line twists. However, the skydiver can treat this as a normal high-speed malfunction, release the main, and deploy the reserve. Failing to clear the entanglement prior to deploying the reserve may result in a main-reserve entanglement.

=== Slider hangup ===
This malfunction occurs when the slider does not descend fully, preventing the canopy from inflating completely.

If it is hung up near the top of the lines, the canopy will not provide sufficient lift or drag, and the rate of descent will be high. In this case one will need to cut away the main and deploy the reserve.

If the slider hangs up midway down the lines, the canopy will inflate almost normally (and may or may not be safe to land in that condition). In this case, the slider can be usually "worked" the rest of the way down by pulling on the rear risers, or by releasing the steering lines ("brakes") and pulling them down repeatedly ("pumping"). If the malfunction can not be cleared sufficiently and one decides to cut away, the decision to do so must be made at a high enough altitude to allow the reserve to deploy.

== Low-speed malfunctions ==
=== Line over ===
This malfunction occurs when one or more of the canopy's lines pass in front of the nose prior to inflation. This causes the canopy to open in a "Bow-tie" shape. The result is generally an uncontrollable spin. The correct procedure to handle the malfunction is to cut away although it is sometimes possible to clear the malfunction by collapsing the parachute and letting the line pass back into the right position.

=== Two canopies out ===
Since a sport skydiver jumps with a main and a reserve parachute, it is possible for both parachutes to deploy. This often occurs when a skydiver employing an Automatic Activation Device (AAD) deploys the main canopy at an altitude low enough for the AAD to activate. This may result in a dangerous main-reserve entanglement. More commonly, the two canopies will arrange themselves in a biplane, side by side, or a dangerous downplane configuration. Having two deployed parachutes side by side can create considerably more lift to the point of becoming dangerously hard to control. One should always attempt to fly the canopy more overhead.

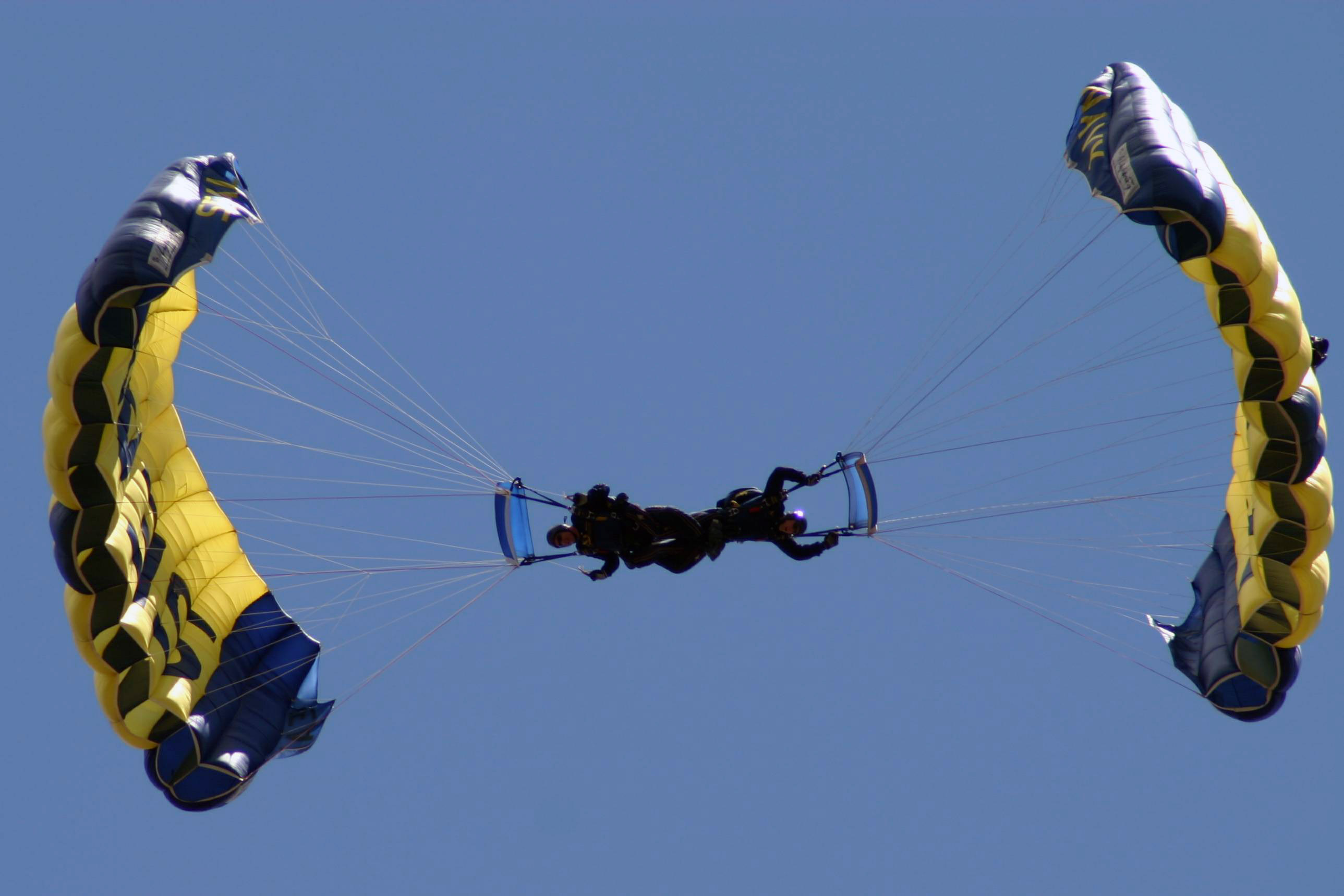
In a down-plane malfunction, there would be one parachutist under two canopies.

Safely landing a two-out scenario

The two canopies will arrange themselves into a biplane or side by side. At any point it can shift into a down plane, which will accelerate the parachutist quickly downwards. The parachutist must not cutaway while under two canopies due to risk of entanglement of the parachutes unless the canopies begin to shift into a down plane. The moment the canopies are pulling apart from each other is when the parachute should be cut away.

=== Line twist ===
This is where a parachute twists around the vertical axis on deployment. This causes the parachute to only partially open especially if the slider is above the line twists. If a parachutist is unable to kick out of the line twists (rotating their body to untwist the lines) they will have to cut away.

Twisted parachute lines immediately after deployment

=== Closed end cells ===
This is when the parachute is open, but the end cells have not yet inflated. This can usually be cleared by waiting for the cells to self-inflate. Alternatively, the parachutist can pull gently on the rear risers or relax the steering lines and then pull them down, as in a flare.

== See also ==
- "Blood on the Risers", an American paratrooper song from World War II
- Death of Stephen Hilder, in a parachute incident in 2003
- Parachute Murder, a 2010 Belgian love triangle skydiving murder case
- Victoria Cilliers, skydiver who survived a murder attempt on her in 2015
- Cut-away
- Hook knife
