= Capewell release system =

The Capewell release system is a means to cut-away the canopy of a parachute, developed by the Capewell Horse Nail Company. According to Capewell,

The Capewell Release was developed in response to paratroopers’ needs for a release that would quickly free them from the parachute canopy upon landing.

Capewell explains the origin of the release system, referencing the T-10 parachute and a 1960 article in the Atlanta Journal-Constitution by Karl Fleming detailing over 100 injuries of 279 jumpers from the 82nd Airborne Division at Naval Air Facility El Centro in a 1959 exercise, 5 deaths and 100+ injuries to the 101st Airborne Division at Fort Campbell in 1958 with Operation Eagle Wing, "Exercise Long Horn" near Fort Hood in 1952 injuring 230 paratroopers, and accusing that the Army Airborne had been aware of these issues since at least 1942.
