= RSL =

RSL may refer to:

== Military ==
- Reserve static line, in skydiving
- Returned and Services League of Australia, current name (since 1990) of a defence forces veterans organisation
  - Returned Sailors' and Soldiers' Imperial League of Australia (1916–1940)
  - Returned Sailors' Soldiers' and Airmen's Imperial League of Australia (1940–1965)
  - Returned Services League of Australia (1965–1990)

== Sports ==
- Real Salt Lake, a US soccer club
- Royal Standard de Liège, a Belgian association football club
- Reserve static line in skydiving
- Rugby Super League (United States), a rugby union organization
- Russian Superleague, a now defunct hockey league in Russia
- Roshn Saudi League, in football, sponsors' name for the Saudi Pro League

== Technology ==
- RAISE Specification Language, a formal approach to software development
- Really Simple Licensing, an open content licensing standard
- RenderMan Shading Language, a language from the RenderMan Interface Specification used for writing shaders
- Restricted service licence, British limited time low-power radio or television broadcasting
- Received Signal Level, signal strength of data transmitted via radio waves

== Other uses ==
- Radcliffe Science Library, Oxford University
- Raid: Shadow Legends, 2018 mobile game by Plarium Games
- Recurrent slope lineae, surface features on Mars
- Registered Social Landlord, a British independent public housing organization
- Relative sea level, the distance from the ocean floor to its surface
- Rennellese Sign Language, an extinct form of home sign documented from Rennell Island in 1974
- Revolutionary Socialist League (disambiguation), the name of several political groups
- Robert Sean Leonard (born 1969), American actor
- Royal Society of Literature, the senior literary organisation in Britain
- Russian Sign Language, a sign language used by the deaf community in Russia
- Russian State Library, the national library of Russia

== See also ==
- RLS (disambiguation)
