= Cut-away =

Skydiving term

Cut-away is a skydiving term referring to disconnecting the main parachute from the harness-container in case of a malfunction in preparation for opening the reserve parachute. The 3-ring release system on parachutes allows a rapid cut-away in the event of an emergency.

Modern skydiving harness-containers have two containers; one for the main parachute, and another one for the reserve. These containers are built into a single "backpack", with the reserve container above the main. In case the main parachute malfunctions, it is necessary to jettison the main before deploying the reserve to avoid a main-reserve entanglement. This act of jettisoning the main is called a "cut-away".

Over the years, several different devices have been designed for cutting away the main canopy. Among the most popular until the 1970s were variations of the Capewell release system, then Bill Booth invented the 3-ring release. Variations of the 3-ring release can now be found on practically all sport and military free fall parachutes.

Cutting away with the 3-ring release is done by pulling a handle placed on the main lift web of the harness. In some cases, parts of the malfunctioning main parachute may be tangled with the skydiver, in which case it may be necessary to use a hook knife to literally cut away the main.

Cutaway is also the title of a 2000 action film about skydiving.
