= Closing loop =

Component of a parachuting system

The closing loop in a parachuting system is the small loop of cloth attached to the container, into which the closing pin gets pushed, to seal the parachute inside until deployment. Closing loops are typically 1.5 to 3 inches long and made out of type 2A nylon. Closing loops can hold 225-400 pounds on average.
