= Closing pin =

A closing pin is a curved piece of stainless steel metal used in the sport of skydiving. The pin is sewn onto the bridle, which is a 7- to 10-foot-long piece of nylon webbing connected to the pilot chute. The closing pin passes through the closing loop and in doing so, secures the main container of a skydiving rig, keeping the parachute from deploying prematurely. When the pilot chute is thrown out by the skydiver and catches air, it pulls the closing pin from the closing loop and allows the main parachute to be released from the container and inflate.

== Fashion ==
Because the closing pin is seen by many skydivers as a life-saving piece of equipment, it has become a symbol of the sport for those who have experienced only one tandem jump and also for those who have hundreds and thousands of jumps. The closing pin is often worn as a piece of jewelry on necklaces and bracelets. It is also a popular tattoo among skydivers. Used as a fashion accessory, the closing pin serves as a symbol – allowing skydivers to recognize one another and their mutual love of the sport.
