= 3-ring release system =

Parachute cut-away system

Releasing 3-ring

The 3-ring release system is a parachute component that is widely used by sport skydivers and military freefall parachutists to attach the two risers of a main parachute to the harness that bears the load under the parachute.

Invented in its original large ring form by Bill Booth, and subsequently scaled down for thinner Type 17 webbing risers the three-ring system allows a skydiver to quickly cut-away (release or separate from) a malfunctioning main parachute with a single motion. Skydivers usually need to do this quickly during emergencies in which they need to deploy a reserve parachute. The three-ring system is simple, inexpensive, reliable, and requires fewer operations than earlier parachute release systems while reducing the physical force needed.

The large bottom ring is securely attached to the skydiver's harness, the middle ring is securely attached to the end of the parachute riser, and the small ring is securely attached to the parachute riser above the middle ring. The middle ring is passed through the large ring and looped upwards; the small ring is then passed through the middle ring and looped upwards. Continuing in the same manner, a cord loop is passed through the small ring, loop upwards, and finally passes through a grommet to the opposing side of the parachute riser. A semi-rigid cable attached to a release handle then passes through this loop, securing the loop. Releasing the cord loop by removing the cable with a tug causes the three-ring system to cascade free and quickly disconnect the riser from the harness.

Each ring in the series multiplies the mechanical advantage of the loop of cord that is held in place by the semi-rigid cable (a Lolon-F or Teflon impregnated plastic coated steel cable, depending on manufacturer).

== Variations ==
There are a few different variations of the 3-ring system. The original 3-ring release from the late 1970s is now known as large 3-rings. A version using smaller rings (mini rings) was introduced in the 1980s. The reasons for the development of the mini ring system and the associated smaller risers were mostly aesthetic; the mini rings do not increase safety but actually reduce the mechanical advantage inherent in the system thereby increasing the pull force a jumper must apply to cut-away. Tandem systems still use rings that are even larger than the original rings, and some tandem rigs even use four rings (e.g., Advance Tandem by Basik). Other variations have placed the rings under the risers facing back instead of forward of the risers facing front or varied the geometry of the rings for example using an elongated middle ring for a claimed improvement in mechanical advantage on Aerodyne's miniforce system.

== Safety concerns ==
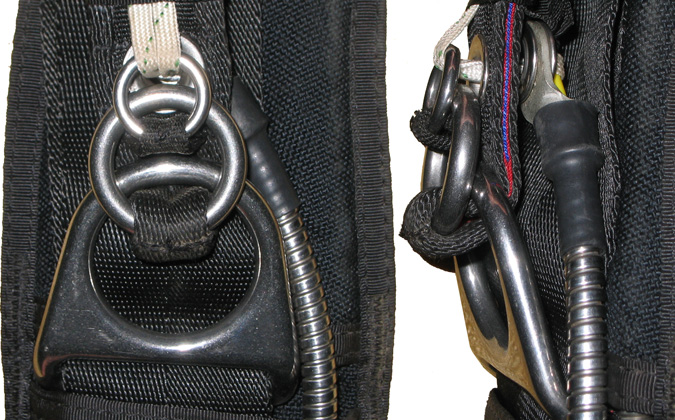
Front and side views of a 3-ring (mini rings) release system on a single riser of a packed main parachute

Since the introduction of the 3-ring system, variations in the design have raised safety concerns. For example, the move to mini rings and mini risers caused riser failures on some designs until riser strength was improved. The failure of some manufacturers to include stiff riser inserts and other hard housing cable guides to allow the free movement of the cutaway cable when risers and webbing are twisted has caused difficulty in cutting away from malfunctions with riser twists or harness deformations. The tolerance in the manufacture of the fabric risers and their connection to the rings is critical in maintaining the mechanical advantage of the 3-ring system and this has been compromised in some designs. Reversed risers placing the rings under the risers has prevented the rings moving freely and releasing under some cutaway scenarios. Replacement of the Lolon-F coating with Teflon impregnated compounds has caused both cracking and cable stripping problems.

== Maintenance ==
Regular maintenance of the 3-ring system and risers is essential. Manufacturers recommend that the risers be disconnected from the harness and flexed, the rings should be checked for cracks or corrosion and the cable should be removed from the housing, cleaned and lubricated, typically with silicone based lubricant.
