= Käthe Paulus =

German exhibition parachutist (1868–1935)

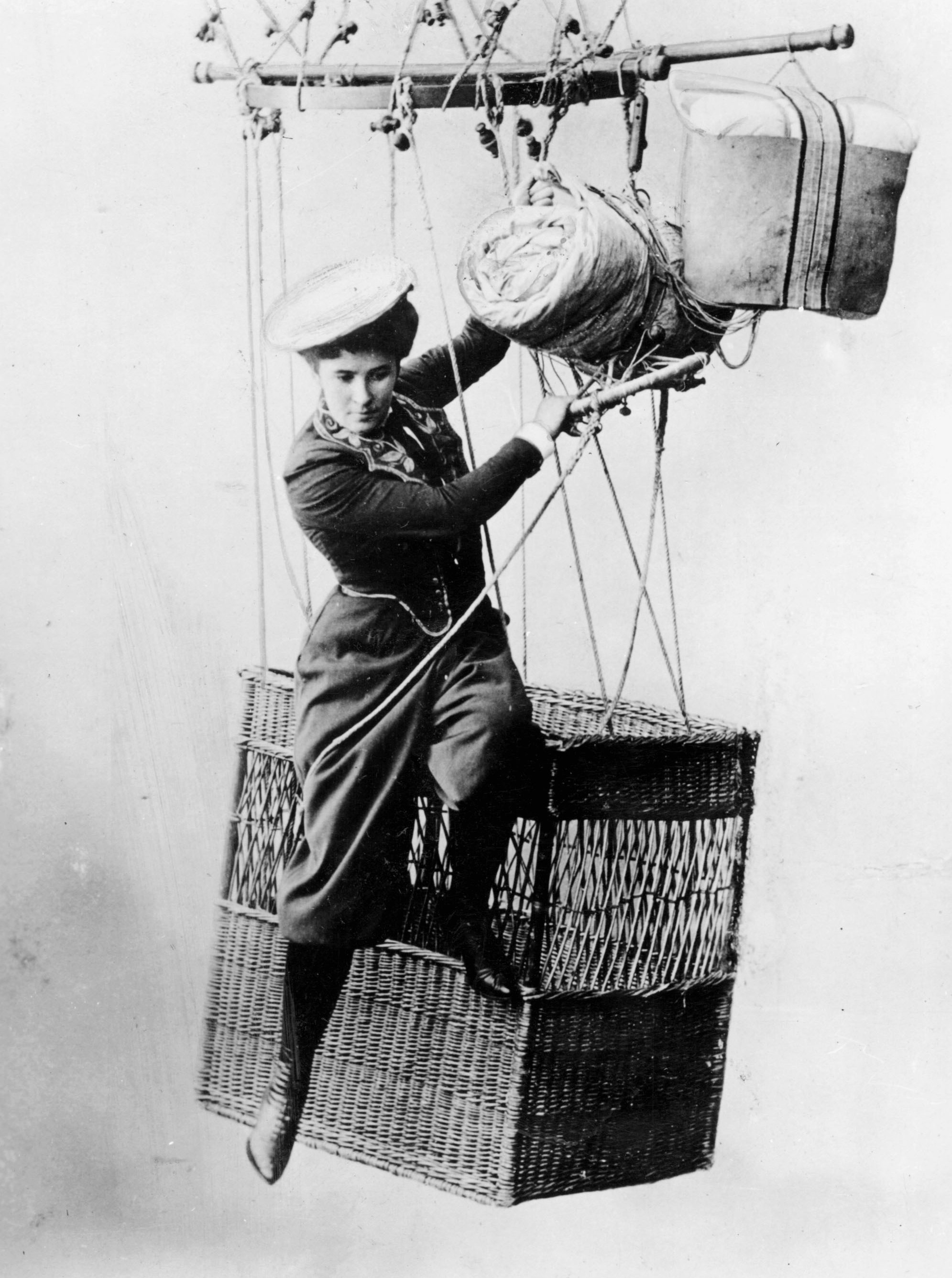
- Born: 22 December 1868; Zellhausen
- Died: 26 July 1935 (aged 66)
- Known for: Inventor of collapsable parachute, aerial acrobatics performer

Katharina "Käthe" Paulus (22 December 1868 – 26 July 1935) was a German exhibition parachute jumper and the inventor of the first collapsible parachute. At the time, 1910, the parachute was named "rescue apparatus for aeronauts". The previous parachutes were not able to fit in a case like apparatus worn on the back, thus Paulus' invention became of paramount importance for the Germans in the First World War and she produced about 7,000 parachutes for the German forces. During the First World War, Paulus created approximately 125 parachutes a week. She was also credited with inventing the "drag 'chute", an intentional breakaway system where one small parachute opens to pull out the main parachute.

Paulus was an avid aeronaut herself and logged over 510 balloon flights and over 165 parachute jumps in her lifetime. She was the first German to be a professional air pilot and the first German woman aerial acrobat.

Despite the fact that hot air balloons are currently known as a sort of tourist attraction, during the final decades of the 19th century these hot air balloons were on the cutting edge of technology, and were popular before the invention of the airplane.

== Life ==
Paulus was born in Zellhausen, today part of Mainhausen, near Frankfurt, Germany, into a working-class family. Her father worked as a day laborer and died when she was nineteen years old. After his death, Paulus picked up her mother's trade of seamstressing to help support the family.

At 21, she met Hermann Lattemann, a well-known balloonist, and began working as his assistant to repair the balloons with her skills as a seamstress. Paulus and Lattemann begun to develop their professional and personal relationship, until Paulus began to parachute herself, and the two eventually were married. They had a son, Willy Hermann Paulus, who later died of diphtheria. In 1895, the couple were on a joint jump when Lattlemann's parachute failed to deploy. Paulus watched him fall to his death.

While grieving the death of her husband, Paulus stayed in bed for months. During this time, thousands of admirers mailed letters of support to her to request she continue her career of being a ballooner. She then bought four new parachutes and set off on a tour of Europe using the stage name Miss Polly. She performed theatrically, using acrobatic feats and even riding a bicycle suspending from a hot air balloon's basket. Paulus became an international success.

Paulus completed her last balloon jump at age 63 on August 5, 1931.

== Death ==
Paulus died at the age of 66 and is buried in a cemetery in Reinickendorf.

== Honors ==
- In 2006, a street in Berlin was named after Paulus titled "Katharina-Paulus-Straße". It was formerly titled Lehrter station. It is located between Europaplatz in the north and Old Moabit in the south.
- A street is named in her honor in Frankfurt-Bockenheim
- Paulus was the first German woman to parachute out of a hot air balloon.
- In 1917, Paulus received a Service Cross of Merit after twenty balloon German troops parachuted to safety.
- Paulus will be inducted into the International Skydiving Hall of Fame in September 2024
