= Main assisted reserve deployment =

Skydiving safety device

A main assisted reserve deployment (MARD) system is a skydiving safety device for parachute systems. While there are many variations, the operation and intended outcome for each is the same: open the reserve parachute container and extract the reserve parachute's deployment bag (and parachute) using the jettisoned main canopy. A MARD builds upon how a reserve static line (RSL) safety device works and in most circumstances, MARDs incorporate an RSL.

== Parachute deployment ==
To understand what and how a MARD works, it is important to describe deployment systems and how a MARD is built upon these.

In modern, common sport parachute systems, there are two parachutes: a main and a reserve. There are three types of intended parachute deployments: main only, reserve only, and main deployment and jettison followed by the reserve. A reserve deployment followed by a main deployment is a fourth and not intended deployment sequence. MARDs and RSLs operate with the reserve deployment, and therefore had two modes of operation: main jettison to reserve deployment and reserve only deployment.

=== Manual deployment ===
==== Main deployment ====
The main parachute deployment sequence starts via a throw-out pilot chute, which upon inflating with the high-speed relative wind going past a free-falling jumper wearing the parachute system, extracts the main pin holding the main container closed. Once open, the pilot chute extracts the main deployment bag - a nylon bag which holds the main parachute and stages the parachute deployment allowing the parachute lines to reach tension prior to releasing the parachute allowing it to inflate.

==== Reserve deployment ====
The reserve parachute deployment sequence is similar to a main deployment sequence, although initiation can occur a number of different ways depending on which safety systems are installed. The primary way to start the deployment sequence is by pulling the steel cable ripcord. This ripcord is attached to the reserve pin, which holds the reserve container closed. Once released, a spring-loaded pilot chute, similar to the main pilot chute (but usually slightly larger), launches into the relative wind and performs the same deployment operation as the main deployment sequence: the reserve pilot chute extracts the reserve deployment bag—a nylon bag holding the reserve parachute and staging the parachute deployment allowing the parachute lines to reach tensions prior to releasing the parachute allowing it to inflate.

=== Safety system deployment ===
==== RSL deployment ====
A RSL—a common safety device for many parachutes and usually a part of a MARD—is a long-standing safety device that assists a jumper in deploying the reserve following a jettisoned main canopy. Following the concept of static line jumping, where starting the main parachute deployment sequence relies on attaching a fixed cord to a large, stable object: namely the aircraft. However, for a skydiver, the aircraft is substituted for the already deployed and now jettisoned main parachute to extract the reserve pin and start the reserve deployment sequence. The RSL (a lanyard attached to the main canopy and the reserve pin) will perform this reserve pin extraction without the need for the skydiver to pull the reserve ripcord. With the reserve pin extracted, the spring-loaded pilot chute launches into the wind and follows the same reserve deployment sequence as described above. The RSL usually initiates the reserve deployment sequence faster (requiring less altitude) and more reliably than a skydiver is able to pull the reserve ripcord—especially when after jettisoning a main canopy a skydiver may be experiencing physiological or mental effects that delay or inhibit manual reserve deployment. If the skydiver deploys the reserve only (leaving the main still packed in the parachute system), the RSL does not operate, and the reserve will deploy as described above.

==== MARD deployment ====
A MARD builds upon the operational concept of the RSL, and further speeds up the reserve deployment sequence by bypassing the reliance of the reserve pilot chute during the use of the MARD. The MARD uses an RSL, or RSL style system, to extract the reserve pin and open the reserve container. However, unlike a reserve-only deployment that relies on the reserve pilot chute for parachute extraction and deployment, the MARD system uses the jettisoned main canopy in place of the reserve pilot chute. All other steps of the subsequent deployment sequence do not change. This means while the spring loaded pilot chute will launch and attempt to inflate, the jettisoned main canopy will overpower it due to its significantly larger size (and pull). In most cases, the attached jettisoned main will have already performed reserve bag extraction, tensioned lines, and released the reserve parachute for inflation by the time the reserve pilot chute would be inflated. This further speeds up the reserve deployment sequence, requiring even less altitude for deployment. If the skydiver deploys the reserve only, the reserve-only deployment described above occurs, with one notable difference, though. Unlike the RSL, during a reserve-only deployment, the MARD needs to disengage from the reserve pilot chute, otherwise if it remains attached, the reserve pilot chute will be secured to the main (and packed) canopy and successful reserve deployment will be unlikely.

== MARD operation ==
A MARD system has two modes of operation: a main jettison to reserve deployment and a reserve only operation. For each type of MARD developed, it requires some form of attachment between the main and reserve deployment systems. In many MARD systems, the system is usually attached between the main and reserve, and in the case of a reserve only deployment, must 'disengage' to allow for a reserve only deployment. In a few MARD designs, the opposite is designed: during a main jettison to reserve deployment, the MARD system must 'engage' and connect the main and reserve, while during a reserve deployment the MARD system remains unattached. This lends to different MARD systems looking very different from one another, and the complexity of operation to varies as well, despite their resulting end operation being the same.

In the 'disengage' style MARDs, a small but simple hook attached to the pilot chute allows for the RSL to include a lanyard that is engaged with the hook. During main canopy jettison, the RSL opens the container, and the included lanyard pulls the hook, which extracts the reserve deployment bag and begins the rest of the reserve deployment. During a reserve only deployment, when the pilot chute launches, the hook departs from the lanyard in such a way that the RSL lanyard becomes disengaged, allowing for the pilot chute to operate without still being attached. This is a description of the Skyhook system, hence its name.

In the 'engage' style MARDs, a small but simple choker loop is attached to the RSL lanyard and staged so that it can tighten around part of the reserve pilot chute system. During main canopy jettison, the RSL opens the container, and the lanyard pulls the choker loop, which secures to the reserve pilot chute system, by pulling it, it extracts the reserve deployment bag and begins the rest of the reserve deployment. During a reserve only deployment, when the pilot chute launches, because the choker loop has not been pulled, it escapes the loop and operates normally as intended.

== Comparisons ==
The MARD gives two major advantages compared to a standard reserve deployment: a faster reserve deployment (requiring less altitude) and keeping jettisoned components conglomerated allowing for easier retrieval. Disadvantages include added risk due to complexity during reserve packing and conglomerated gear runs higher risk of complete gear loss. While there are safety arguments to be made against the MARD, in most instances of sport parachuting, MARDs offer significant improvements in safety. While not a universal rule, most skydiving facilities offering tandem skydiving will be required by the parachute manufacturer to use a MARD system.

Due to its prominence and early arrival to the market, the Skyhook has become the genericized trademark for MARDs. There are other systems, such as the Skydive Wings Reserve Boost, VSE Infinity MARD, Mirage Trap System, Rigging Innovations MOJO MARD, Strong Enterprises Air Anchor, Peregrine Manufacturing Ace. All of these, though, are referred to as MARDs.
