= Hook knife =

Skydiving safety equipment

A hook knife in skydiving is a piece of safety equipment for use in the event of emergencies where one may need to cut tangled lines away. The design somewhat resembles a safety mail opener or "paper knife", wherein the user pulls a steeply-angled blade into harness webbing and/or suspension lines if needed as part of practiced Emergency Procedures (EPs).

As of the 2026 edits to the Basic Safety Requirements (BSRs) written by the United States Parachute Association (USPA),

On all tandem skydives, the tandem rating holder must be equipped with a readily accessible hook knife capable of severing Type 7 nylon webbing (or its equivalent). All aircraft used for skydiving must carry the same capability hook knife, readily accessible to the pilot and occupants.

SkydiveMag has featured a 2020 article written by a Master Rigger which details many potential situations where a jumper may need to use their hook knife, along with multiple different design types, as well as a 2019 article by a BASE jumper detailing how, when, and where jumpers might employ their hook knives in an emergency. Additionally, a 2026 article in Parachutist magazine emphasizes the importance of a hook knife to minimize incidents, while implicating Reason's Swiss cheese model of accident causation, and a 2021 article details the specifics of when a hook knife was required.

== See Also ==
- Malfunction (parachuting)
- Cut-away
