= Hermann Lattemann =

Hermann Lattemann (September 14, 1852, Gebhardshagen near Braunschweig – June 17, 1894, Krefeld) was a German balloon pilot and inventor who experimented with an early prototype of a parachute.

Together with his wife Käthe Paulus, Lattemann designed a parachute prototype in an attempt to make balloon flights safer. The main invention was to have parachutes folded and packed in bags.

Lattemann died during a test. At age 42, his parachute failed to open, although his wife's parachute did open, when they both jumped out of a balloon named "Fin de Siècle", and she watched his fall in horror. Little or no money was made from this invention following his death, but during World War I improvements made by his wife and sold as Paula's parachute, made her a fortune, lost later on due to inflation.
