= Revolutionary Socialist League =

Revolutionary Socialist League may refer to:

- Revolutionary Socialist League (UK)
  - Revolutionary Socialist League (UK, 1938), Trotskyist group, disbanded 1944
  - Revolutionary Socialist League (UK, 1957), became the Militant group (Labour Party entryists, notably 1970s–1980s)
- Revolutionary Socialist League (US) (1972–1989)
- Revolutionary Socialist League (Germany) (1994–2016)
- Revolutionary Socialist League (Kenya)
