= Karl Fleming =

American journalist

Karl Fleming (August 30, 1927 – August 11, 2012) was an American journalist who made a significant contribution to the Civil Rights Movement through his work for Newsweek magazine in the 1960s. Fleming was born in Newport News, Virginia in 1927.

== Early life ==
When he was a baby, his father died. His mother remarried and had a daughter with her new husband. At the age of 6, his stepfather died and soon after his mother was diagnosed with tuberculosis. Fleming and his half sister were forced to go into an orphanage. Fleming has claimed that his experiences as a young boy in the orphanage encouraged a hatred of bullies and a support for the underdog that influenced his position on the civil rights struggle.

== Education ==
Fleming attended college for two years and in 1945 joined the US Navy.

== Career ==
After his serving in the Navy, Fleming worked at local newspapers and eventually worked his way up to becoming a reporter for The Atlanta Constitution Magazine. In 1961, having worked as a stringer for Newsweek for a number of months, he was hired by the magazine as a permanent correspondent in their Atlanta Bureau when Bill Emerson, formerly Atlanta Bureau Chief, was promoted. During his career as a journalist, Fleming risked his life covering James Meredith's entry into the University of Mississippi and also in 1964 when he covered the murder of three civil rights activists (James Chaney, Andrew Goodman and Michael Schwerner) in Philadelphia, Mississippi. After a brief stint at the Houston Bureau, Fleming was promoted to chief of Newsweek's Los Angeles Bureau. Whilst in this post, Fleming not only covered the Watts riots of 1965 but was also severely beaten during a later flare-up of tension in LA's southern black neighborhood in 1966. In 1972 two men used counterfeit 20-dollar bills printed with D. B. Cooper serial numbers to swindle $30,000 from Karl Fleming who was then working for Newsweek in exchange for an interview with a man they falsely claimed was the hijacker.

== Personal life ==
Fleming's first wife was Sandra Sisk and his second wife was Anne Taylor Fleming. He has four sons named Chas, David, Russell, and Mark and eight grandchildren. Sisk died in 2007.

== Death ==
He died at his Los Angeles home in 2012 of respiratory complications at the age of 84.

== Bibliography ==
- The First Time: Famous People Tell about Their First Sexual Experience (1975), with Anne Taylor Fleming. Simon & Schuster
- Son Of The Rough South: An Uncivil Memoir (2005) ISBN 1-58648-296-3
