= Slider (parachuting) =

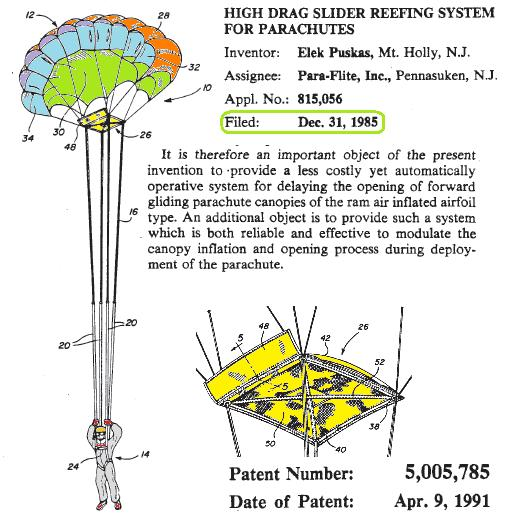
Extract from US Patent 5005785

A slider is a small rectangular piece of fabric with a grommet near each corner used to control the deployment of a "ram-air" parachute. It is a type of reefing device. A ram-air parachute / parafoil has a tendency to open very rapidly. At high velocities, the opening shock from a rapid deployment can cause damage to the canopy or injury to the jumper. The slider was developed as a way of mitigating this. During deployment, the slider slides down from the canopy to the risers. Air resistance slows its descent. The slider holds the lines together, which slows the parachute inflation. The slider also deflects some of the rising air column away from the center of the canopy as it inflates. This also helps moderate the speed of opening. This invention solved the rapid deployment problem with ram-air designs. Sliders also reduce the chance of the lines twisting to cause a malfunction.

In BASE jumping a rapid canopy deployment is desirable. The slider may be constructed of mesh, packed so that the slider is at the base of the lines and does not inhibit the opening ("slider down") instead of up by the canopy, or removed completely. Slider down and slider off both allow the canopy to open with no resistance and are identical in performance.

In 1971, Domina Jalbert's ram air parachute was designed and tested at Wright-Patterson Air Force Base in Vandalia, Ohio. Theodore Hulsizer, civilian prototype parachute manufacturer for the United States Air Force and NASA (1947–1973), made the first working parafoil parachute. While testing his prototype in the wind tunnel at Wright-Patterson Air Force Base in Dayton, Ohio, USA, Theodore realized its drag was stronger than any other parachute he had tested in his 25 years of experience. He believed others' attempts ripped to shreds, because of the drag. To slow the opening of the parafoil, Theodore ran the cords through rings he designed that were slid to the top while packing the parachute. As it opened, the rings had to slide down, slowing the opening. Theodore personally made the first full-size parafoil, which worked in its first drop.
