= Bill Booth =

American engineer and inventor

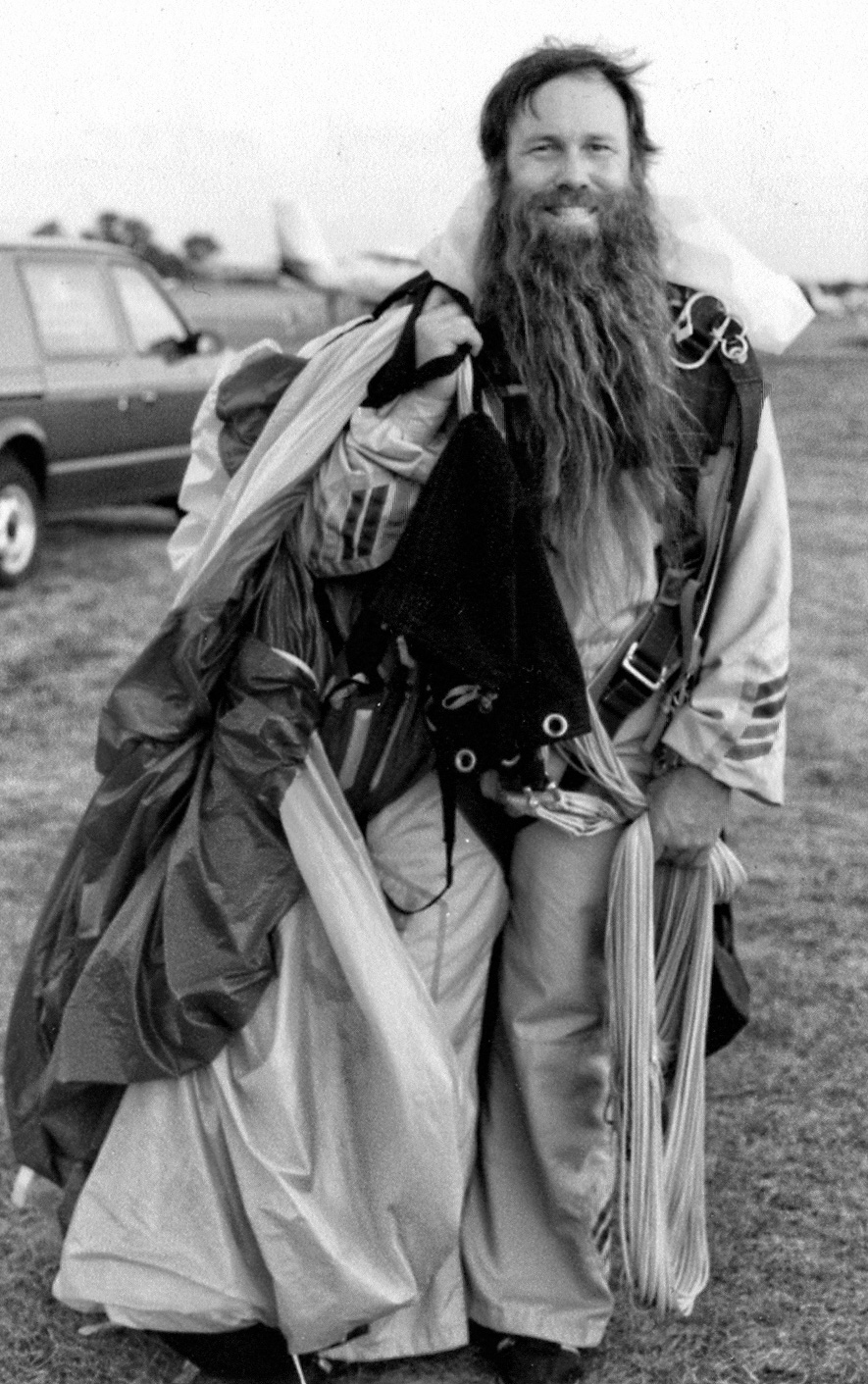
- Occupations: Engineer, inventor, entrepreneur

Bill Booth (born 1946 in Coral Gables, Florida) is an American engineer, inventor, and entrepreneur in the skydiving equipment manufacturing industry. His invention of the 3-ring release safety device has enhanced skydiving safety. He founded the companies United Parachute Technologies and Complete Parachute Solutions, which had 150 employees as of 2015.

== Work ==
Bill Booth began skydiving in 1965, and in 1972 started a skydiving equipment company based in a Miami garage. In the late 1970s, Booth made two skydiving inventions. First he invented and patented the Hand Deploy Pilot chute System. Later, he invented the 3-ring release system.

The company's first harness/container system was the Wonderhog in 1974. This was followed by the Wonderhog Sprint and in 1980 by the Vector. The U.S. Skydiving Team wore the first Vectors at the 1981 World Meet. The Vector II followed six years later.

In 1983, Booth received the Parachute Equipment Industry Association Achievement Award. The Federation Aeronautic International awarded him the 1984 Gold Medal for outstanding achievement in parachute safety design.

== Inventions ==
Booth's invention of the 3-ring release safety device enhanced skydiving safety. The device allows the rapid release of the skydiver's main parachute in the event of a malfunction. As of 2020, all sport skydiving equipment and some military systems employ the design.

He also invented the pull-out and throw-out pilot chute. A pilot chute is a small parachute used to extract and deploy a main parachute. The throw-out approach replaces the spring-loaded pilot chute which was released by a rip-cord. The throw-out system allows the skydiver to deploy his or her pilot chute directly into the air stream. Other inventions include the Skyhook RSL safety device and the "Sigma System" for tandem drogue release.

Booth founded The Relative Workshop, a sport skydiving equipment manufacturer that introduced the WonderHog harness/container system. The WonderHog was so named because of the 'piggy-back' design with the reserve container located above the main container on the back of the skydiver instead of the belly-mounted reserve seen on earlier systems. The Relative Workshop has changed its name and is now called United Parachute Technologies.

Booth was also instrumental in obtaining FAA recognition of the tandem jump as a means of teaching skydiving. From 1984 to 2001, tandem skydiving was possible in the U.S. only as an "volunteer experimental test jumper" under exemptions to FAA rules, due to the "one person, two parachutes" definition of parachuting.

United Parachute Technologies sells the Vector 3 and Vector 3 Micron Harness/Container system. The latest versions incorporate innovations like magnetic riser covers, a spectra ripcord and the Skyhook RSL system.

'Booth's rule #2', which states that "The safer skydiving gear becomes, the more chances skydivers will take, in order to keep the fatality rate constant" is often attributed to him. This is an example of risk compensation.

== Films ==
- Bill Booth appears as a part of a waiver and introduction-to-skydiving video shown to first-time tandem students who jump with the Vector Tandem system.
- He acted as the seaplane pilot and bartender in the 1993 film The Firm, starring Tom Cruise and Gene Hackman.
- He played a small role as a bearded skydiver in the 2000 feature film Cutaway

== Trivia ==
- He was part of several Russian skydiving expeditions to the North Pole.
- He survived a single engine plane crash on August 27, 2013 after the plane he was piloting lost power.
