= Reserve static line =

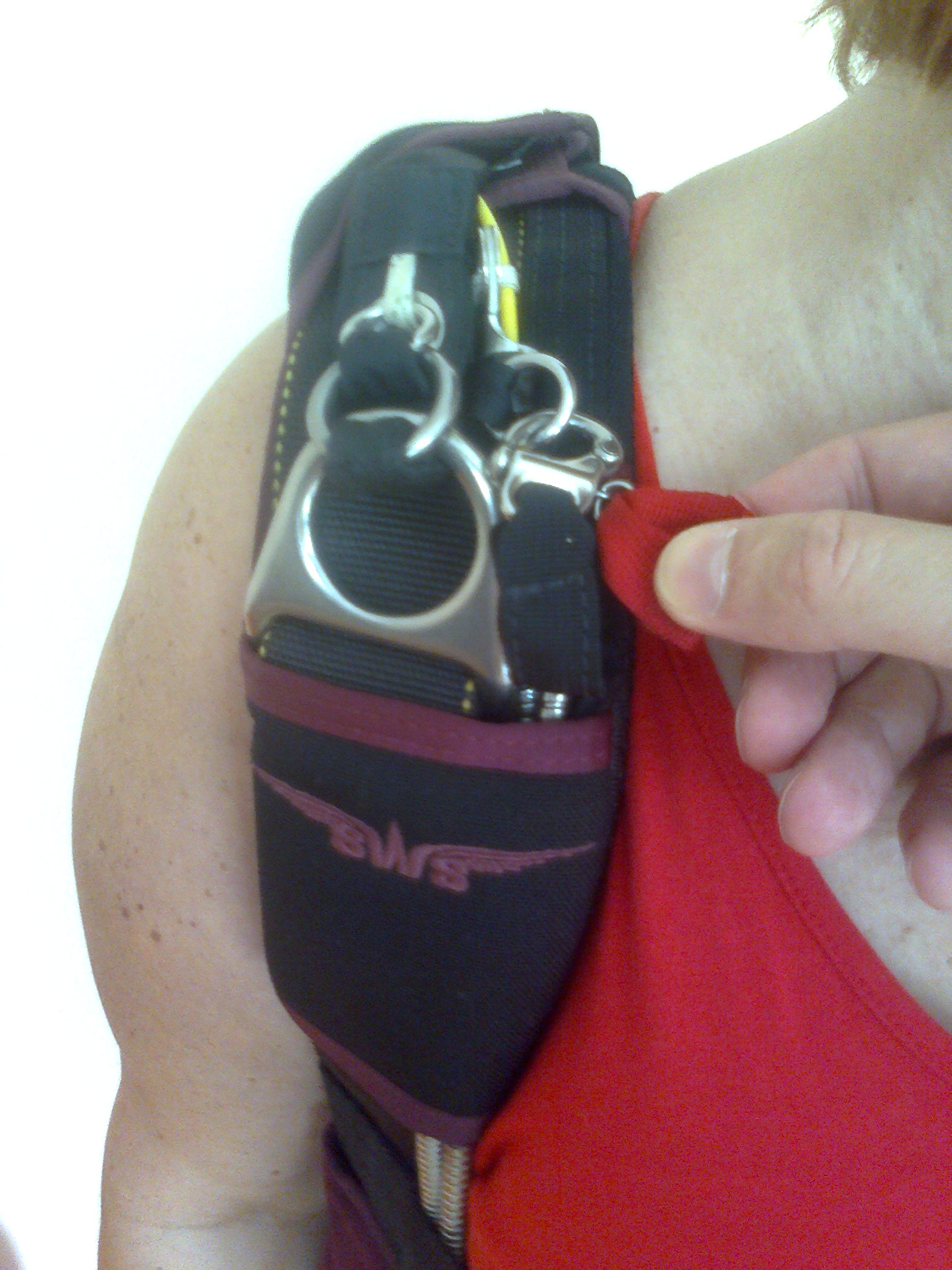
RSL - Reserve Static Line RSL Shackle, held, and part of RSL shown installed in the container and attached to the main canopy riser RSL ring.

A reserve static line, sometimes called a Stevens Lanyard or Stevens Release, is a device that automatically opens the reserve parachute container when the main parachute is cut-away. Developed by Perry Stevens in 1964, it is basically a lanyard connecting one or both of the main parachute risers to either the reserve ripcord handle, the ripcord housing, or most commonly to the ripcord cable.

The primary advantage of using an RSL is a faster reserve parachute deployment compared with using emergency handles alone; after a cut-away, the RSL will usually activate before the reserve deployment ripcord is pulled. However, proper emergency procedures require the reserve ripcord to be pulled in the event that the RSL is disconnected or not functioning correctly. An RSL also offers protection in the event a jumper cuts-away but does not (or can not) reach for the reserve deployment handle.

The RSL can be disengaged by a skydiver in situations where it is desirable to detach the main parachute without deploying the reserve. Examples of such situations may include certain high-wind landings (in case the parachute must be cut away if the skydiver is being dragged across the ground), when performing canopy formations or when landing in the water.The RSL attaches to the risers through a small metal loop that will disconnect when a fabric tab is pulled.

== See also ==
- Skyhook (skydiving)
