= Parachute =

Device used to slow the motion of an object through an atmosphere

Paratroopers deploying their parachutes during an exercise

A parachute is a device designed to slow an object's descent through an atmosphere by creating drag or aerodynamic lift. It is primarily used to safely support people exiting aircraft at height, but also serves various purposes like slowing cargo, aiding in space capsule recovery on Earth, landing spacecraft on other planets, and stabilizing vehicles or objects. Modern parachutes are typically made from durable fabrics like nylon and come in various shapes, such as dome-shaped, rectangular, and inverted domes, depending on their specific function.

The concept of the parachute dates back to ancient attempts at flight. In AD 852, Armen Firman, in Córdoba, Spain, made the first recorded jump with a large cloak to slow his fall. Renaissance figures like Francesco di Giorgio Martini and Leonardo da Vinci later sketched designs resembling modern parachutes, but it was not until the 18th century that the first successful jumps occurred. Frenchman Louis-Sébastien Lenormand made the first public jump in 1783, and he coined the term "parachute" in 1785. In the following years, key advancements were made by figures like André Garnerin, with parachutes becoming lighter, more reliable, and easier to deploy.

By the time of World War I, parachutes had become essential for aviators, and significant improvements were made to their designs, including the introduction of the backpack-style parachute by Charles Broadwick and Gleb Kotelnikov's knapsack parachute. After World War II, parachuting became a popular sport, and new materials like nylon replaced silk. Today, parachutes are used in military, recreational, and emergency situations, continuing to evolve with advances in technology and design.

== History ==
=== Middle Ages ===
In 852, in Córdoba, Spain, the Andalusian Armen Firman attempted unsuccessfully to fly by jumping from a tower while wearing a large cloak. It was recorded that "there was enough air in the folds of his cloak to prevent great injury when he reached the ground."

=== Early Renaissance ===
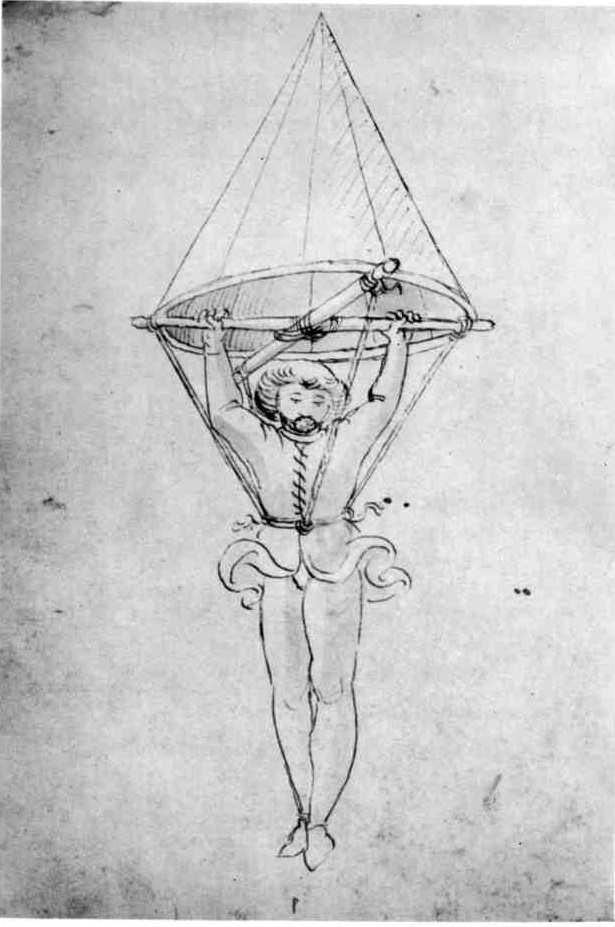
The oldest known depiction of a parachute, attributed to Francesco di Giorgio Martini (Italy, 1470s)

The earliest evidence of an intentional parachute – purposefully designed (unlike Firman's) for that finality – dates back to the Renaissance period. The oldest parachute design appears in a manuscript from the 1470s attributed to Francesco di Giorgio Martini (British Library, Add MS 34113, fol. 200v), showing a free-hanging man clutching a crossbar frame attached to a conical canopy. As a safety measure, four straps ran from the ends of the rods to a waist belt. Although the surface area of the parachute design appears to be too small to offer effective air resistance and the wooden base-frame is superfluous and potentially harmful, the basic concept of a working parachute is apparent.

The design is a marked improvement over another folio (189v), which depicts a man trying to break the force of his fall using two long cloth streamers fastened to two bars, which he grips with his hands.

Shortly after, a more sophisticated parachute was sketched by the polymath Leonardo da Vinci in his Codex Atlanticus (fol. 381v) dated to c. 1485. Here, the scale of the parachute is in a more favorable proportion to the weight of the jumper. A square wooden frame, which alters the shape of the parachute from conical to pyramidal, held open Leonardo's canopy. It is not known whether the Italian inventor was influenced by the earlier design, but he may have learned about the idea through the intensive oral communication among artist-engineers of the time. The feasibility of Leonardo's pyramidal design was successfully tested in 2000 by Briton Adrian Nicholas and again in 2008 by the Swiss skydiver Olivier Vietti-Teppa. According to historian of technology Lynn White, these conical and pyramidal designs, much more elaborate than early artistic jumps with rigid parasols in Asia, mark the origin of "the parachute as we know it."

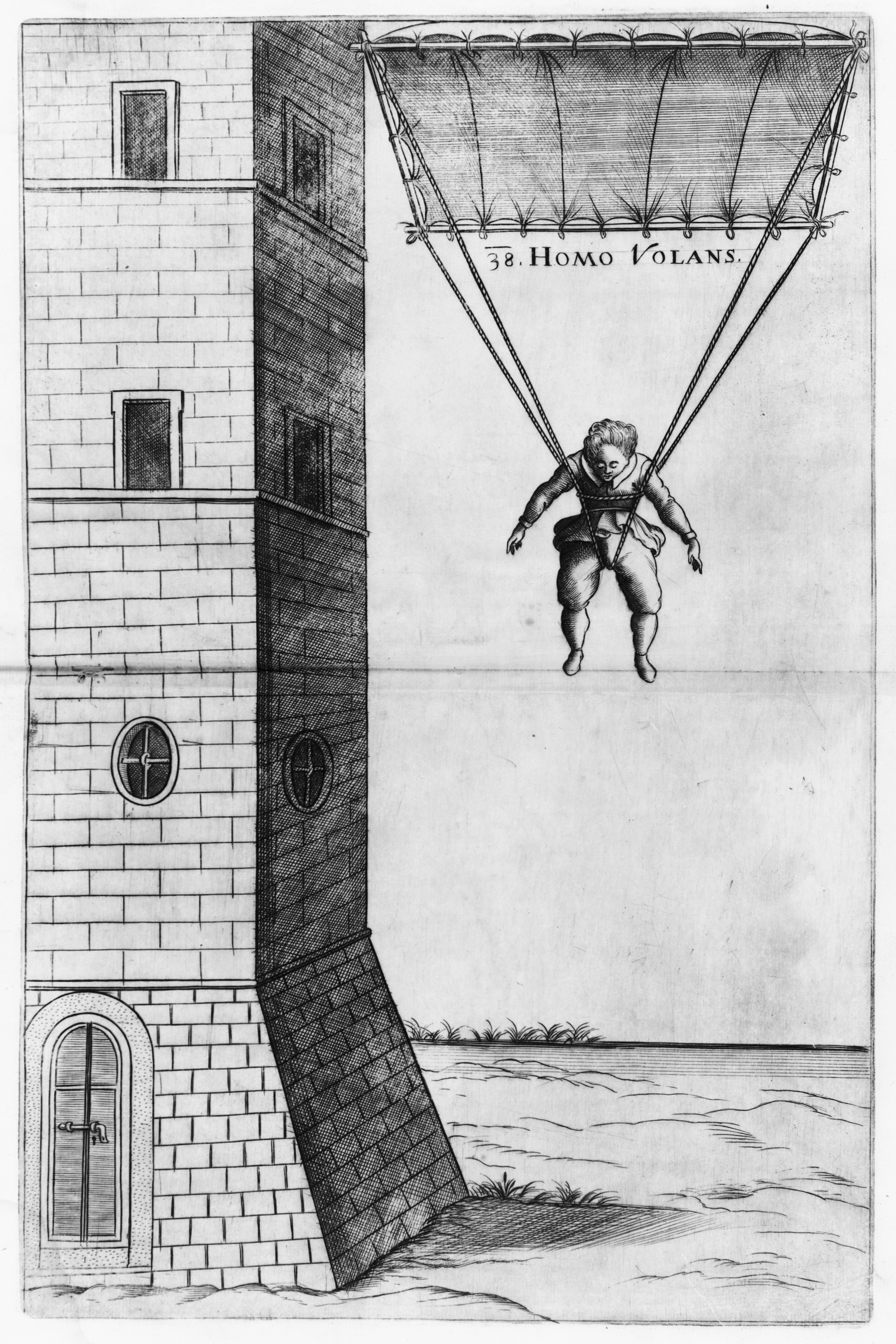
Faust Vrančić's parachute design, titled Homo Volans ("Flying Man"), from his Machinae Novae ("New Contraptions", published in 1615 or 1616)

The Croatian polymath and inventor Faust Vrančić (1551–1617), examined da Vinci's parachute sketch and kept the square frame but replaced the canopy with a bulging sail-like piece of cloth that he came to realize decelerates a fall more effectively. A now-famous depiction of a parachute that he dubbed Homo Volans (Flying Man), showing a man parachuting from a tower, presumably St Mark's Campanile in Venice, appeared in his book on mechanics, Machinae Novae ("New Machines", published in 1615 or 1616), alongside a number of other devices and technical concepts.

It was once widely believed that in 1617, Vrančić, then aged 65 and seriously ill, implemented his design and tested the parachute by jumping from St Mark's Campanile, from a bridge nearby, or from St Martin's Cathedral in Bratislava. Various publications incorrectly claimed the event was documented some thirty years later by John Wilkins, one of the founders of, and secretary of, the Royal Society in London, in his book Mathematical Magick or, the Wonders that may be Performed by Mechanical Geometry, published in London in 1648. However, Wilkins wrote about flying, not parachutes, and does not mention Vrančić, a parachute jump, or any event in 1617. Doubts about this test, which include a lack of written evidence, suggest it never occurred, and was instead a misreading of historical notes.

=== 17th to 19th centuries ===
Simon de La Loubère reported the existence of devices similar to parachutes used in the Ayutthaya Kingdom during the reign of King Narai in the late 17th century. He reported in his 1691 book that a man would jump from a high place with two large umbrellas to entertain the king of Siam, landing into trees, rooftops, and sometimes rivers. The report was read a century later by French physicist Louis-Sébastien Lenormand and would be used to create the modern parachute.

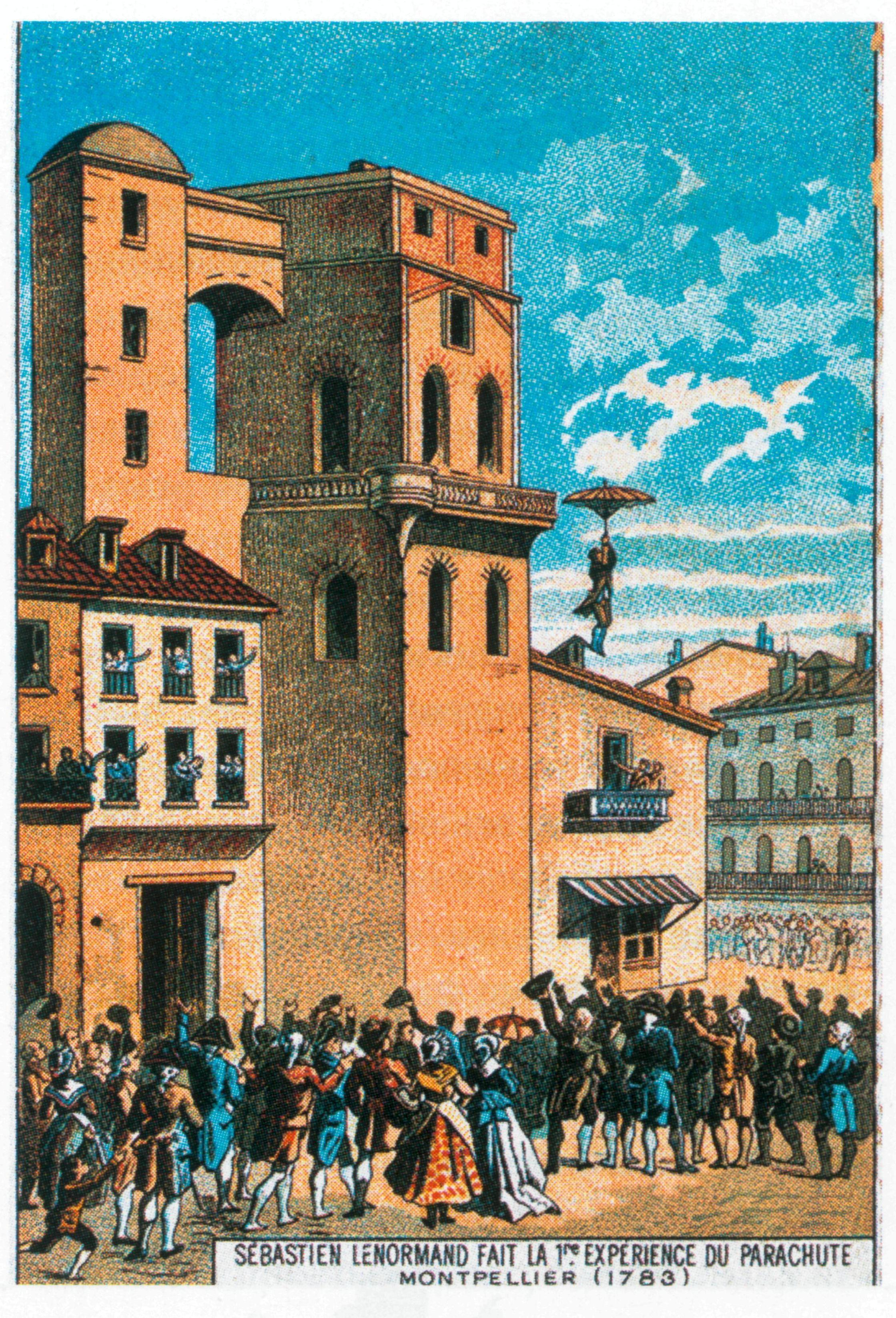
Louis-Sébastien Lenormand jumps from the tower of the Montpellier observatory, 1783. Illustration from the late 19th century.

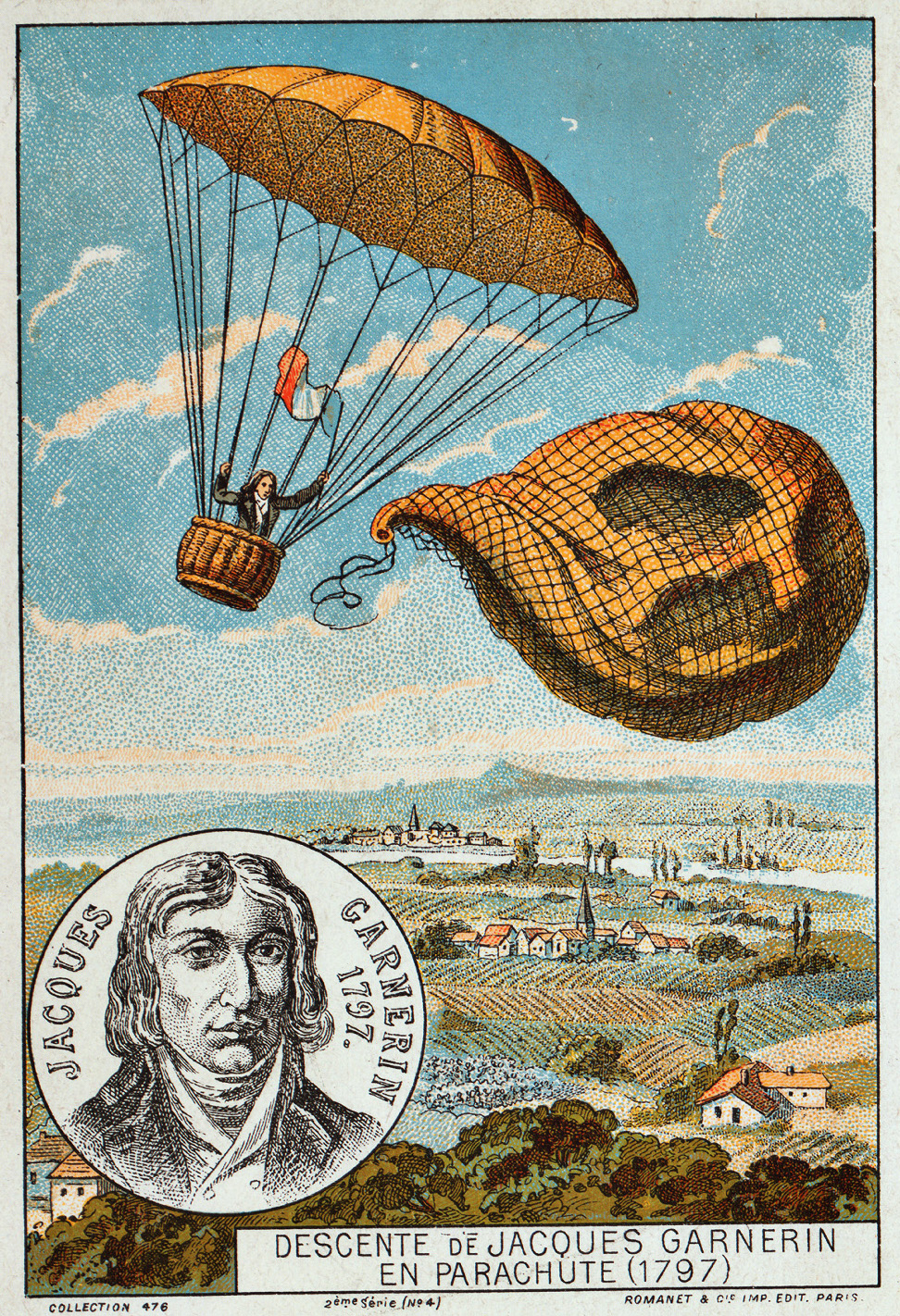
The first use of a frameless parachute, by André Garnerin in 1797

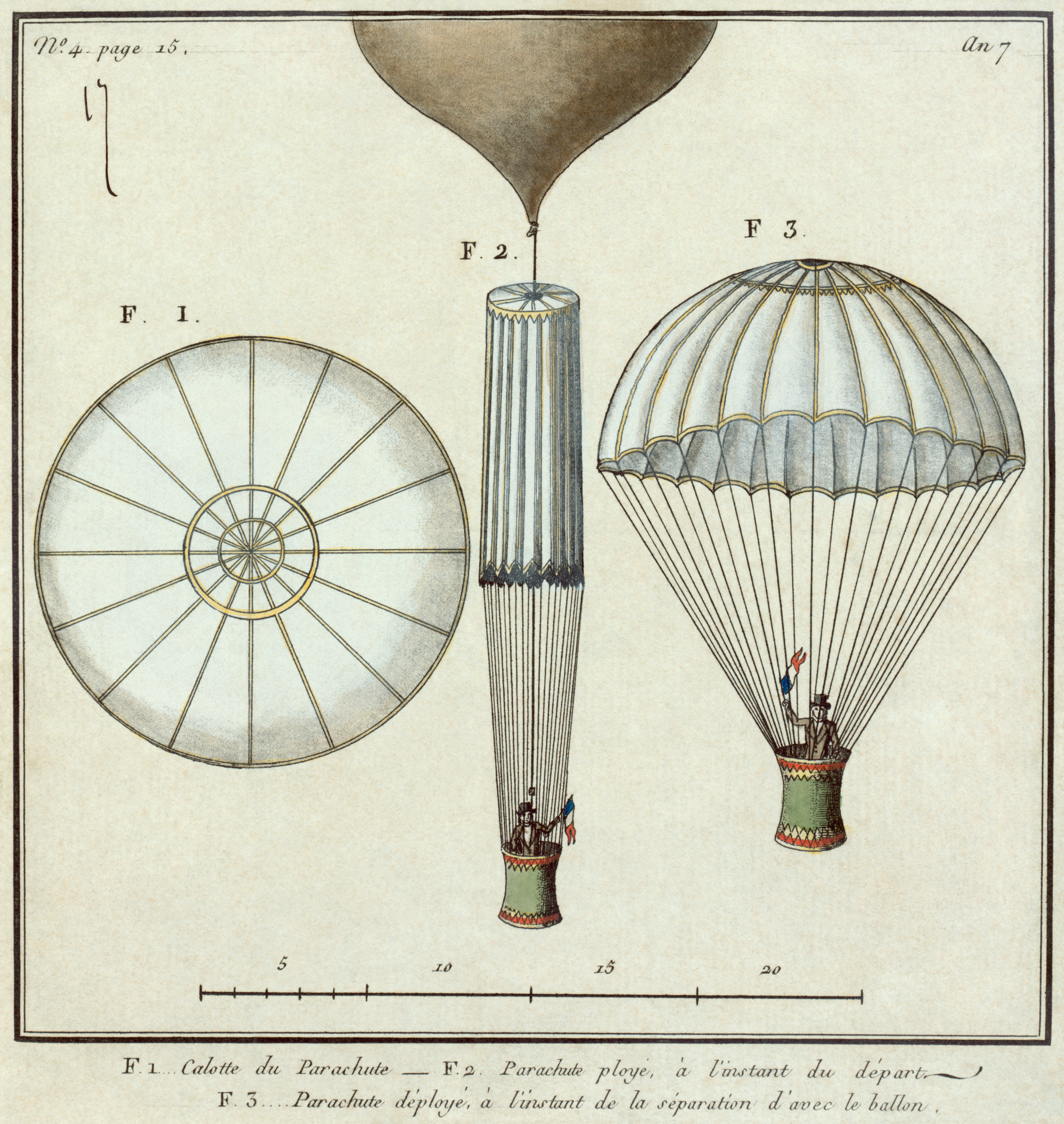
Schematic depiction of Garnerin's parachute, from an early nineteenth-century illustration.

The modern parachute was invented in the late 18th century by Louis-Sébastien Lenormand in France, who made the first recorded public jump in 1783. Lenormand also sketched his device beforehand.

Two years later, in 1785, Lenormand coined the word "parachute" by hybridizing an Italian prefix para, an imperative form of parare = to avert, defend, resist, guard, shield or shroud, from paro = to parry, and chute, the French word for fall, to describe the aeronautical device's real function.

Also in 1785, Jean-Pierre Blanchard demonstrated it as a means of safely disembarking from a hot-air balloon. While Blanchard's first parachute demonstrations were conducted with a dog as the passenger, he later claimed to have had the opportunity to try it himself in 1793 when his hot air balloon ruptured, and he used a parachute to descend. (This event was not witnessed by others.)

On 12 October 1799, Jeanne Geneviève Garnerin ascended in a gondola attached to a balloon. At 900 metres (3,000 ft) she detached the gondola from the balloon and descended in the gondola by parachute. In doing so, she became the first woman to parachute. She went on to complete many ascents and parachute descents in towns across France and Europe.

Subsequent development of the parachute focused on it becoming more compact. While the early parachutes were made of linen stretched over a wooden frame, in the late 1790s, Blanchard began making parachutes from folded silk, taking advantage of silk's strength and light weight. In 1797, André Garnerin made the first descent of a frameless parachute covered in silk. In 1804, Jérôme Lalande introduced a vent in the canopy to eliminate violent oscillations. In 1887, Park Van Tassel and Thomas Scott Baldwin invented a parachute in San Francisco, California, with Baldwin making the first successful parachute jump in the western United States.

=== Eve of World War I ===
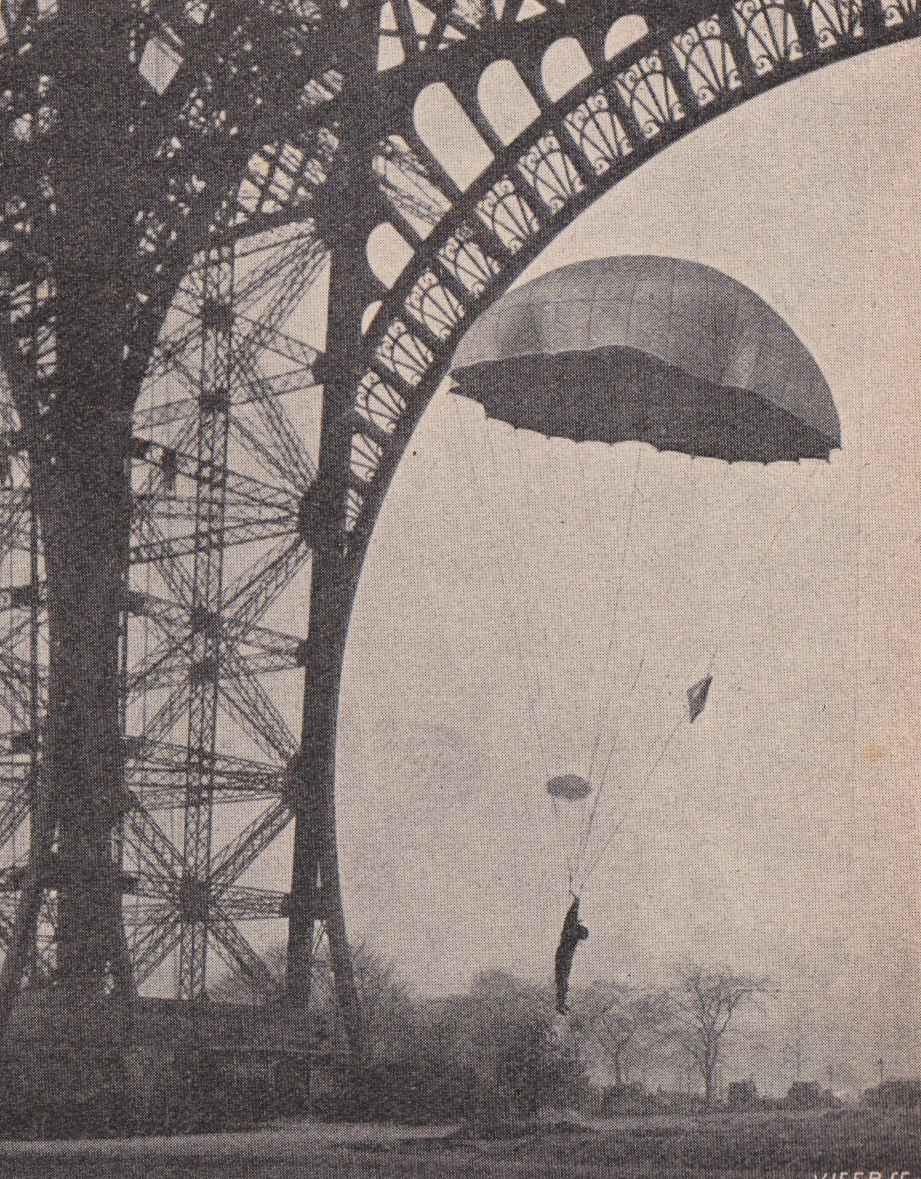
Picture published in the Dutch magazine De Prins der Geïllustreerde Bladen (18 February 1911).

Gleb Kotelnikov and his invention, the knapsack parachute

In 1907 Charles Broadwick demonstrated two key advances in the parachute he used to jump from hot air balloons at fairs: he folded his parachute into a backpack, and the parachute was pulled from the pack by a static line attached to the balloon. When Broadwick jumped from the balloon, the static line became taut, pulled the parachute from the pack, and then snapped.

In 1911 a successful test took place with a dummy at the Eiffel Tower in Paris. The puppet's weight was 75 kg (165 lb); the parachute's weight was 21 kg (46 lb). The cables between the puppet and the parachute were 9 m (30 ft) long. On February 4, 1912, Franz Reichelt jumped to his death from the tower during initial testing of his wearable parachute.

Also in 1911, Grant Morton made the first parachute jump from an airplane, a Wright Model B piloted by Phil Parmalee, at Venice Beach, California. Morton's device was of the "throw-out" type where he held the parachute in his arms as he left the aircraft. In the same year (1911), Russian Gleb Kotelnikov invented the first knapsack parachute, although Hermann Lattemann and his wife Käthe Paulus had been jumping with bagged parachutes in the last decade of the 19th century.

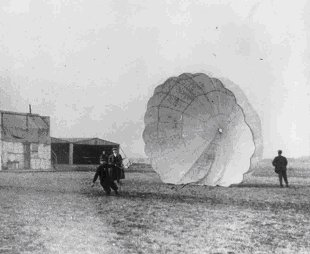
Albert Berry collapses his parachute on Kinloch Field at Jefferson Barracks, Missouri, after his jump on 1 March 1912.

In 1912, on a road near Tsarskoye Selo, years before it became part of St. Petersburg, Kotelnikov successfully demonstrated the braking effects of a parachute by accelerating a Russo-Balt automobile to its top speed and then opening a parachute attached to the back seat, thus also inventing the drogue parachute.

On 1 March 1912, U.S. Army Captain Albert Berry made the first (attached-type) parachute jump in the United States from a fixed-wing aircraft, a Benoist pusher, while flying above Jefferson Barracks, St. Louis, Missouri. The jump utilized a parachute stored or housed in a cone-shaped casing under the airplane and attached to a harness on the jumper's body.

Štefan Banič patented an umbrella-like design in 1914, and sold (or donated) the patent to the United States military, which later modified his design, resulting in the first military parachute. Banič had been the first person to patent the parachute, and his design was the first to properly function in the 20th century.

On June 21, 1913, Georgia Broadwick became the first woman to parachute-jump from a moving aircraft, doing so over Los Angeles, California. In 1914, while doing demonstrations for the U.S. Army, Broadwick deployed her chute manually, thus becoming the first person to jump free-fall.

=== World War I ===
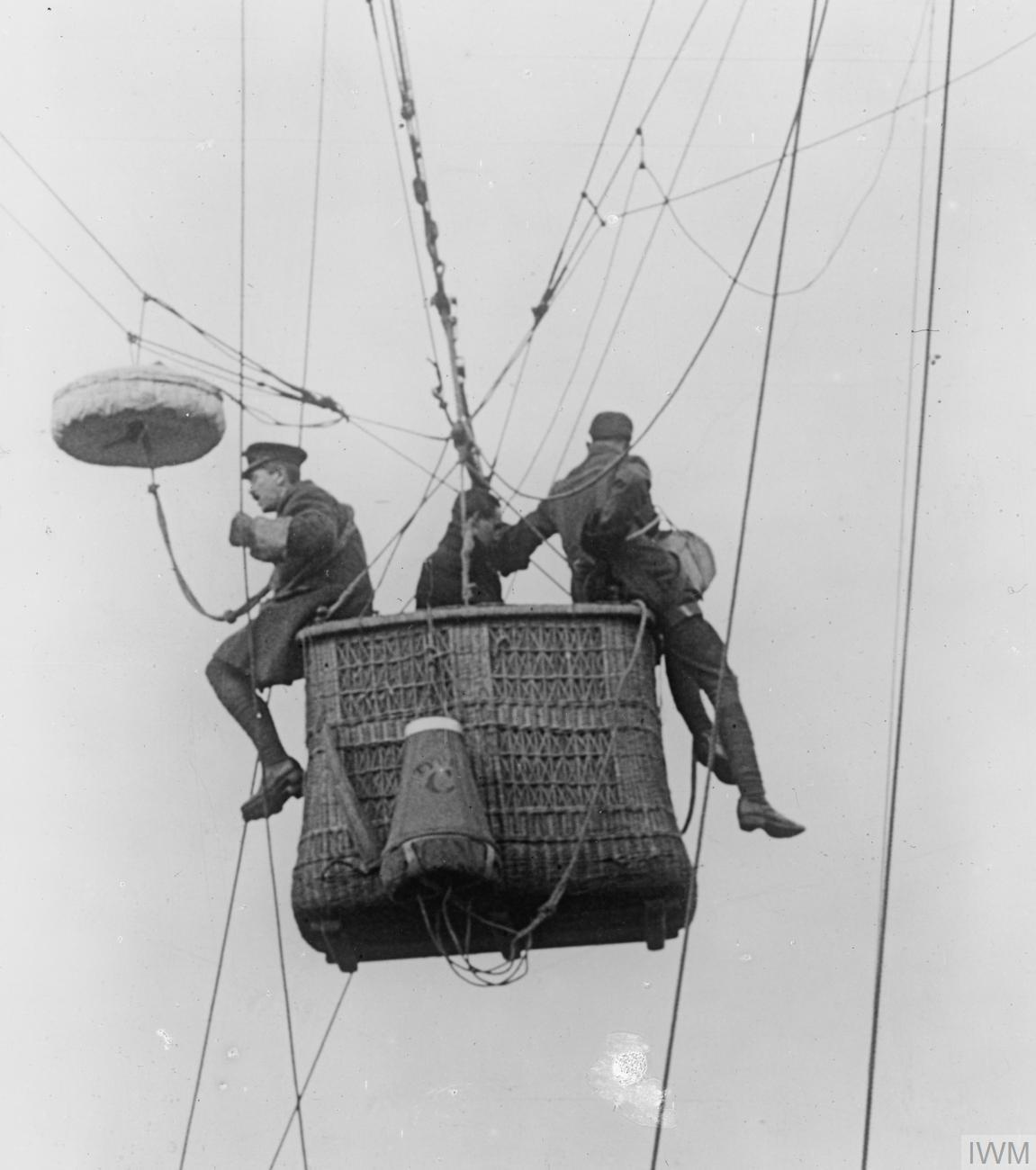
Kite balloon observers preparing to descend by parachute.

The first military use of the parachute was by artillery observers on tethered observation balloons in World War I. These were tempting targets for enemy fighter aircraft, though difficult to destroy, due to their heavy anti-aircraft defenses. Because it was difficult to escape from them, and dangerous when on fire due to their hydrogen inflation, observers would abandon them and descend by parachute as soon as enemy aircraft were seen. The ground crew would then attempt to retrieve and deflate the balloon as quickly as possible. The main part of the parachute was in a bag suspended from the balloon with the pilot wearing only a simple waist harness attached to the main parachute. When the balloon crew jumped the main part of the parachute was pulled from the bag by the crew's waist harness, first the shroud lines, followed by the main canopy. This type of parachute was first adopted on a large scale for their observation balloon crews by the Germans, and then later by the British and French. While this type of unit worked well from balloons, it had mixed results when used on fixed-wing aircraft by the Germans, where the bag was stored in a compartment directly behind the pilot. In many instances where it did not work the shroud lines became entangled with the spinning aircraft. Although this type of parachute saved a number of famous German fighter pilots, including Hermann Göring, no parachutes were issued to the crews of Allied "heavier-than-air" aircraft. It has been claimed that the reason was to avoid pilots jumping from the plane when hit rather than trying to save the aircraft, but Air Vice Marshall Arthur Gould Lee, himself a pilot during the war, examined the British War Office files after the war and found no evidence of such claim.

Airplane cockpits at that time also were not large enough to accommodate a pilot and a parachute, since a seat that would fit a pilot wearing a parachute would be too large for a pilot not wearing one. This is why the German type was stowed in the fuselage, rather than being of the "backpack" type. Weight was—at the very beginning—also a consideration since planes had limited load capacity. Carrying a parachute impeded performance and reduced the useful offensive and fuel load.

In the UK, Everard Calthrop, a railway engineer and breeder of Arab horses, invented and marketed through his Aerial Patents Company a "British Parachute" and the "Guardian Angel" parachute. As part of an investigation into Calthrop's design, on 13 January 1917, test pilot Clive Franklyn Collett successfully jumped from a Royal Aircraft Factory BE.2c flying over Orford Ness Experimental Station at 180 metres (590 ft). He repeated the experiment several days later.

Following on from Collett, balloon officer Thomas Orde-Lees, known as the "Mad Major", successfully jumped from Tower Bridge in London, which led to the balloonists of the Royal Flying Corps using parachutes, though they were issued for use in aircraft.

In 1911, Solomon Lee Van Meter, Jr. of Lexington, Kentucky, submitted an application for, and in July 1916 received, a patent for a backpack style parachute—the Aviatory Life Buoy. His self-contained device featured a revolutionary quick-release mechanism—the ripcord—that allowed a falling aviator to expand the canopy only when safely away from the disabled aircraft.

Otto Heinecke, a German airship ground crewman, designed a parachute which the German air service introduced in 1918, becoming the world's first air service to introduce a standard parachute. Schroeder company of Berlin manufactured Heinecke's design. The first successful use of this parachute was by Leutnant Helmut Steinbrecher of Jagdstaffel 46, who bailed on 27 June 1918 from his stricken fighter airplane to become the first pilot in history to successfully do so. Although many pilots were saved by the Heinecke design, their efficacy was relatively poor. Out of the first 70 German airmen to bail out, around a third died, These fatalities were mostly due to the chute or ripcord becoming entangled in the airframe of their spinning aircraft or because of harness failure, a problem fixed in later versions.

The French, British, American and Italian air services later based their first parachute designs on the Heinecke parachute to varying extents.

In the UK, Sir Frank Mears, who was serving as a Major in the Royal Flying Corps in France (Kite Balloon section), registered a patent in July 1918 for a parachute with a quick release buckle, known as the "Mears parachute", which was in common use from then onwards.

=== Post-World War I ===
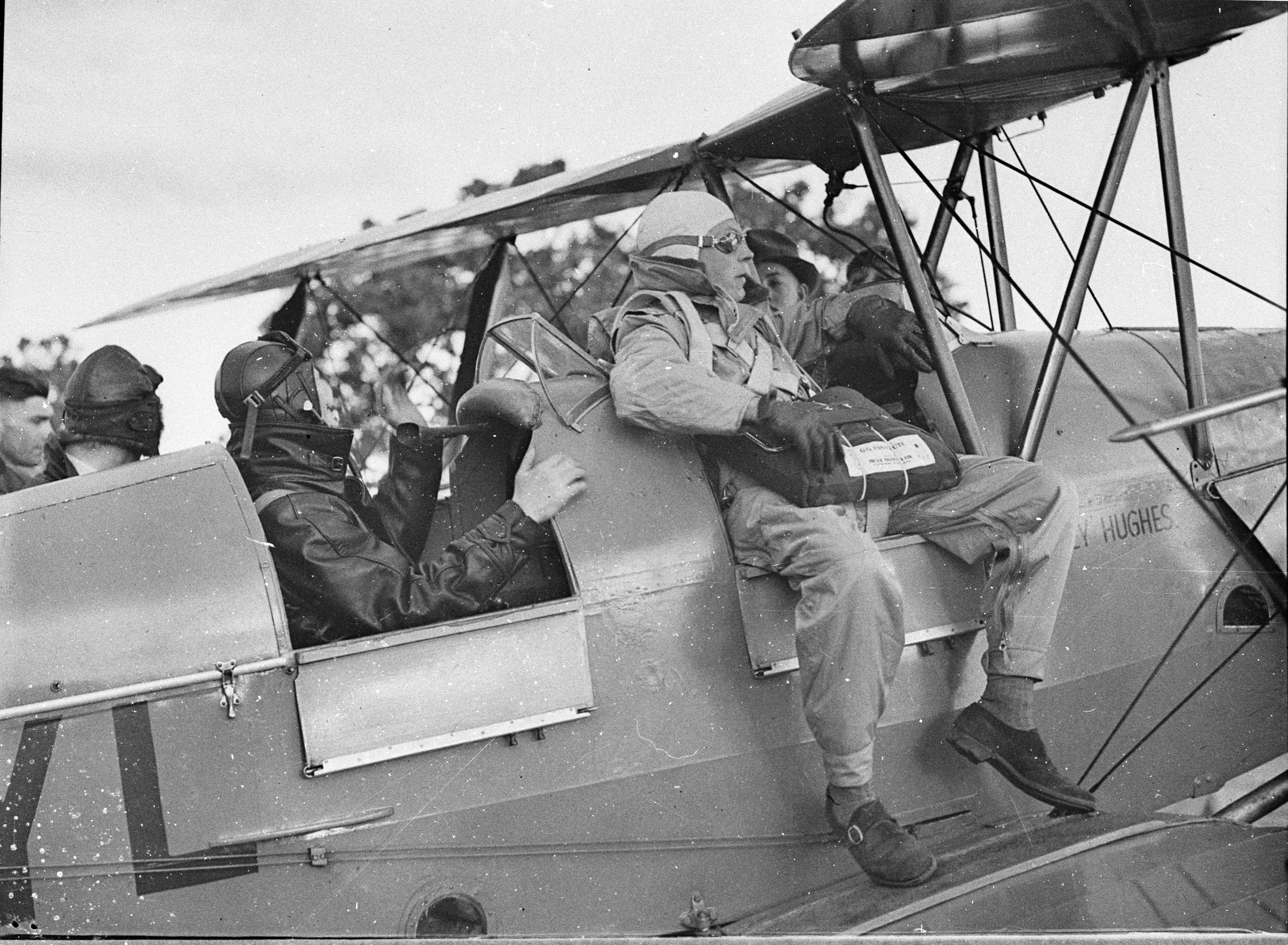
Ben Turner making a parachute jump from a plane at Camden, Sydney, 14 August 1938.

The experience with parachutes during the war highlighted the need to develop a design that could be reliably used to exit a disabled airplane. For instance, tethered parachutes did not work well when the aircraft was spinning. After the war, Major Edward L. Hoffman of the United States Army led an effort to develop an improved parachute by bringing together the best elements of multiple parachute designs. Participants in the effort included Leslie Irvin and James Floyd Smith. The team eventually created the Airplane Parachute Type-A. This incorporated three key elements:

- storing the parachute in a soft pack worn on the back, as demonstrated by Charles Broadwick in 1906;
- a ripcord for manually deploying the parachute at a safe distance from the airplane, from a design by Albert Leo Stevens; and
- a pilot chute that draws the main canopy from the pack.

In 1919, Irvin successfully tested the parachute by jumping from an airplane. The Type-A parachute was put into production and over time saved a number of lives. The effort was recognized by the awarding of the Robert J. Collier Trophy to Major Edward L. Hoffman in 1926.

Irvin became the first person to make a premeditated free-fall parachute jump from an airplane. An early brochure of the Irvin Air Chute Company credits William O'Connor as having become, on 24 August 1920, at McCook Field near Dayton, Ohio, the first person to be saved by an Irvin parachute. Test pilot Lt. Harold R. Harris made another life-saving jump at McCook Field on 20 October 1922. Shortly after Harris' jump, two Dayton newspaper reporters suggested the creation of the Caterpillar Club for successful parachute jumps from disabled aircraft.

Beginning with Italy in 1927, several countries experimented with using parachutes to drop soldiers behind enemy lines. The regular Soviet Airborne Troops were established as early as 1931 after a number of experimental military mass jumps starting from 2 August 1930. Earlier the same year, the first Soviet mass jumps led to the development of the parachuting sport in the Soviet Union. By the time of World War II, large airborne forces were trained and used in surprise attacks, as in the battles for Fort Eben-Emael and The Hague, the first large-scale, opposed landings of paratroopers in military history, by the Germans. This was followed later in the war by airborne assaults on a larger scale, such as the Battle of Crete and Operation Market Garden, the latter being the largest airborne military operation ever. Aircraft crew were routinely equipped with parachutes for emergencies as well.

In 1937, drag chutes were used in aviation for the first time, by Soviet airplanes in the Arctic that were providing support for the polar expeditions of the era, such as the first drifting ice station, North Pole-1. The drag chute allowed airplanes to land safely on smaller ice floes.

Most parachutes were made of silk until World War II cut off supplies from Japan. After Adeline Gray made the first jump using a nylon parachute in June 1942, the industry switched to nylon.

== Types ==
Today's modern parachutes are classified into two categories—ascending and descending canopies. All ascending canopies refer to paragliders, built specifically to ascend and stay aloft as long as possible. Other parachutes, including ram-air non-elliptical, are classified as descending canopies by manufacturers.

Some modern parachutes are classified as semi-rigid wings, which are maneuverable and can make a controlled descent to collapse on impact with the ground.

=== Round ===
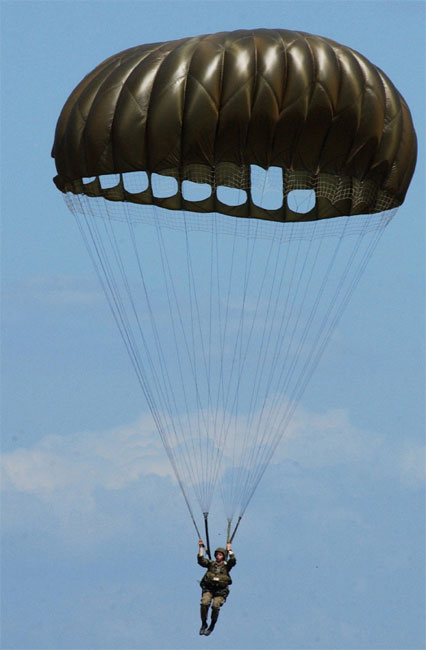
An American paratrooper using an MC1-1C series "round" parachute.

Round parachutes are purely a drag device (that is, unlike the ram-air types, they provide no lift) and are used in military, emergency and cargo applications (e.g. airdrops). Most have large dome-shaped canopies made from a single layer of triangular cloth gores. Some skydivers call them "jellyfish 'chutes" because of the resemblance to the marine organisms. Modern sports parachutists rarely use this type. The first round parachutes were simple, flat circulars. These early parachutes suffered from instability caused by oscillations. A hole in the apex helped to vent some air and reduce the oscillations. Many military applications adopted conical, i.e., cone-shaped, or parabolic (a flat circular canopy with an extended skirt) shapes, such as the United States Army T-10 static-line parachute. A round parachute with no holes in it is more prone to oscillate and is not considered to be steerable. Some parachutes have inverted dome-shaped canopies. These are primarily used for dropping non-human payloads due to their faster rate of descent.

Forward speed (5–13 km/h or 3.1–8.1 mph) and steering can be achieved by cuts in various sections (gores) across the back, or by cutting four lines in the back, thereby modifying the canopy shape to allow air to escape from the back of the canopy, providing limited forward speed. Other modifications sometimes used are cuts in various gores to cause some of the skirt to bow out. Turning is accomplished by forming the edges of the modifications, giving the parachute more speed from one side of the modification than the other. This gives the jumpers the ability to steer the parachute (such as the United States Army MC series parachutes), enabling them to avoid obstacles and to turn into the wind to minimize horizontal speed at landing.

=== Cruciform ===
The unique design characteristics of cruciform parachutes decrease oscillation (its user swinging back and forth) and violent turns during descent. This technology is used by the United States Army as a replacement for the older T-10 parachutes with T-11 parachutes under a program called Advanced Tactical Parachute System (ATPS). The ATPS canopy is a highly modified version of a cross/ cruciform platform and is square in appearance. The ATPS system will reduce the rate of descent by 30 percent from 6.4 metres per second (21 ft/s) to 4.80 metres per second (15.75 ft/s). The T-11 is designed to have an average rate of descent 14% slower than the T-10D, thus resulting in lower landing injury rates for jumpers. The decline in the rate of descent will reduce the impact energy by almost 25% to lessen the potential for injury.

=== Pull-down apex ===
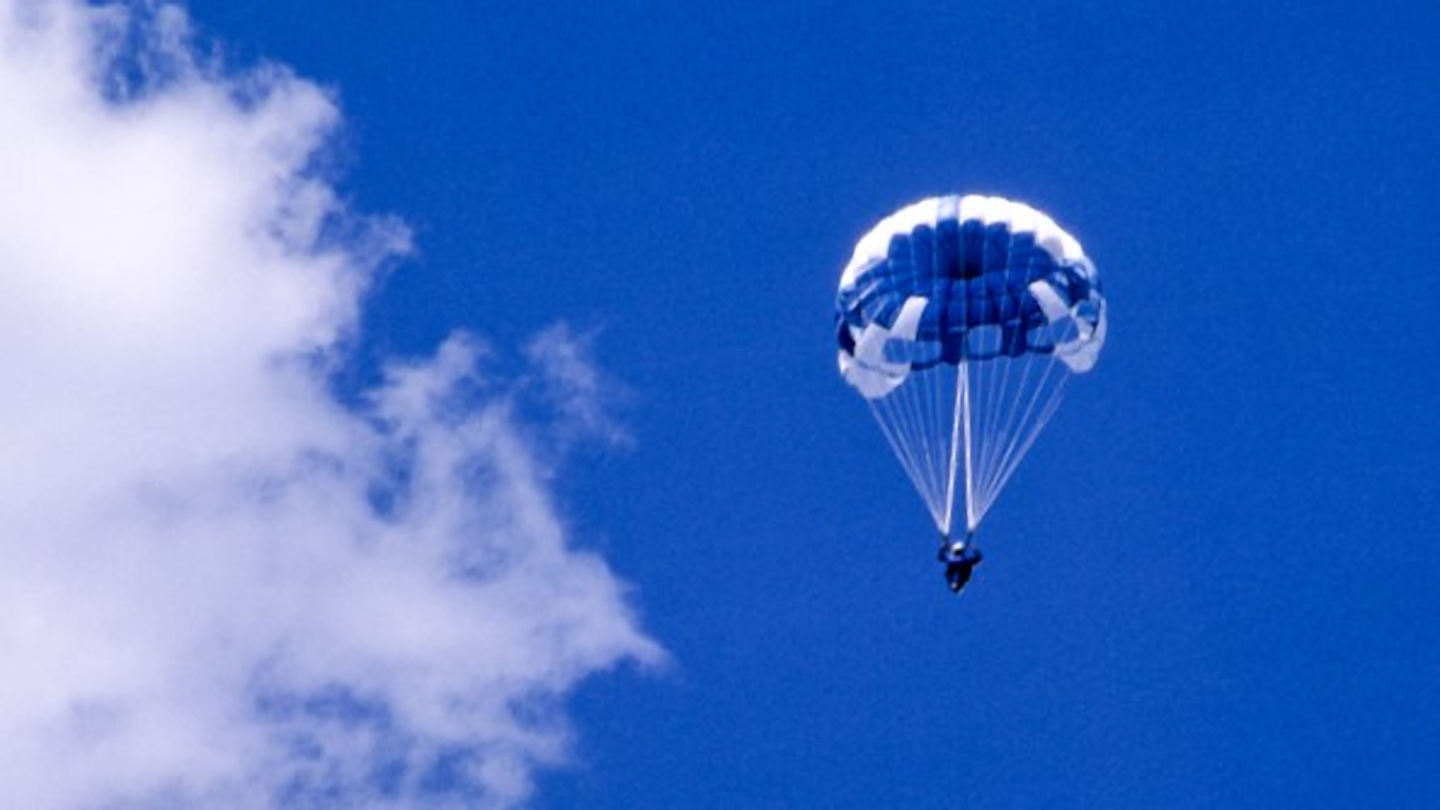
1970s 'high performance' pull-down apex canopy, as seen in the 'round' (or really, elliptical) parachute's centre.

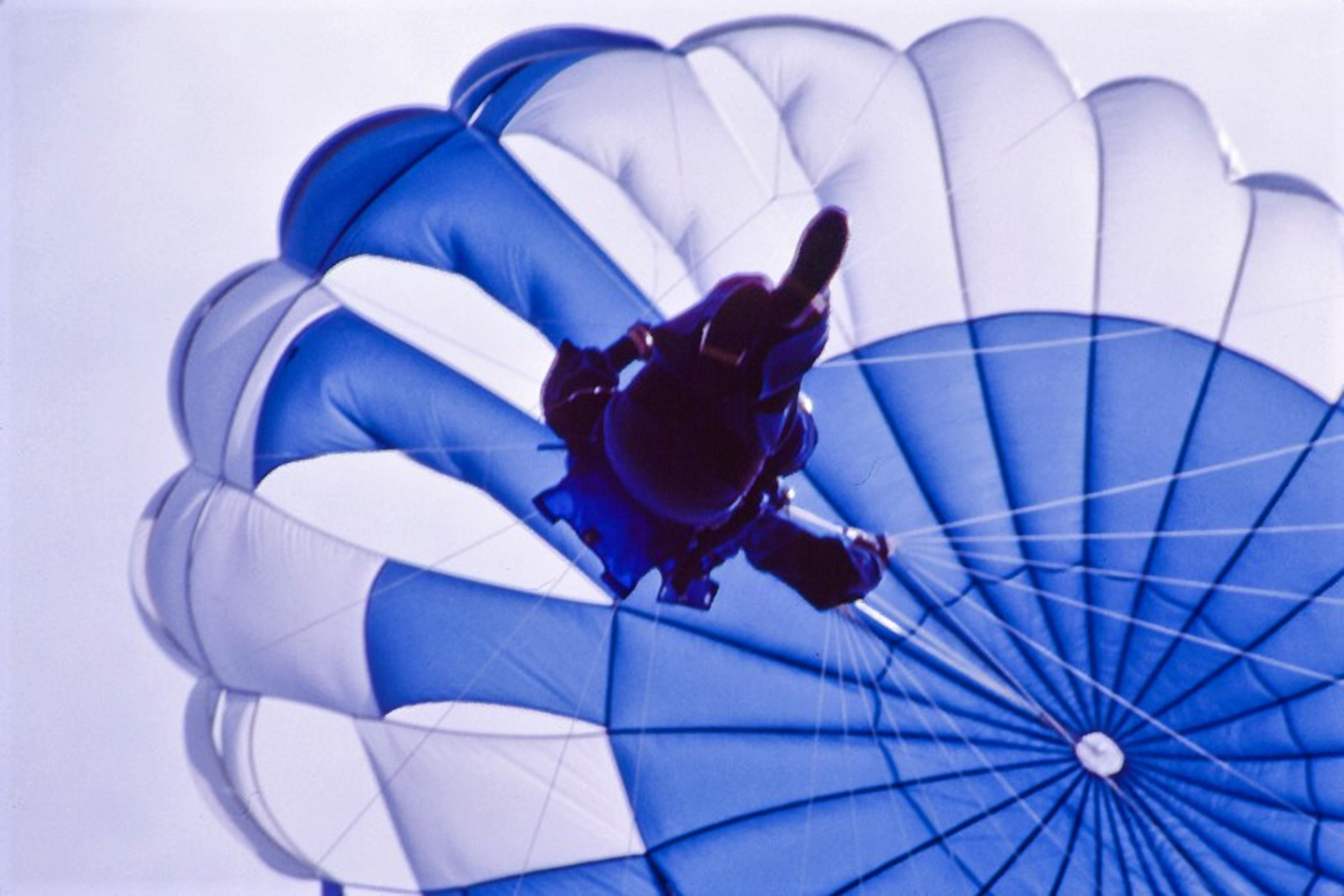
1970s 'round' elliptical showing 4 controllable turn slots, plus another, small side vent and one of 5 rear vents.

A variation on the round parachute is the pull-down apex parachute, invented by a Frenchman named Pierre-Marcel Lemoigne. The first widely used canopy of this type was called the Para-Commander (made by the Pioneer Parachute Co.), although there are many other canopies with a pull-down apex produced in the years thereafter—these had minor differences in attempts to make a higher performance rig, such as different venting configurations. They are all considered 'round' parachutes, but with suspension lines to the canopy apex that apply load there and pull the apex closer to the load, distorting the round shape into a somewhat flattened or lenticular shape when viewed from the side. And while called rounds, they generally have an elliptical shape when viewed from above or below, with the sides bulging out more than the for'd-and-aft dimension, the chord (see the lower photo to the right and you likely can ascertain the difference).

Due to their lenticular shape and appropriate venting, they have a considerably faster forward speed than, say, a modified military canopy. And due to controllable rear-facing vents in the canopy's sides, they also have much snappier turning capabilities, though they are decidedly low-performance compared to today's ram-air rigs. From about the mid-1960s to the late-1970s, this was the most popular parachute design type for sport parachuting (prior to this period, modified military 'rounds' were generally used and after, ram-air 'squares' became common). Note that the use of the word elliptical for these 'round' parachutes is somewhat dated and may cause slight confusion, since some 'squares' (i.e. ram-airs) are elliptical nowadays, too.

=== Annular ===
Some designs with a pull-down apex have the fabric removed from the apex to open a hole through which air can exit (most, if not all, round canopies have at least a small hole to allow easier tie-down for packing – these are not considered annular), giving the canopy an annular geometry. This hole can be very pronounced in some designs, taking up more 'space' than the parachute. They also have decreased horizontal drag due to their flatter shape and, when combined with rear-facing vents, can have considerable forward speed. Truly annular designs – with a hole large enough that the canopy can be classified as ring-shaped – are uncommon.

=== Rogallo wing ===
Sport parachuting has experimented with the Rogallo wing, among other shapes and forms. These were usually an attempt to increase the forward speed and reduce the landing speed offered by the other options at the time. The ram-air parachute's development and the subsequent introduction of the sail slider to slow deployment reduced the level of experimentation in the sport parachuting community. The parachutes are also hard to build.

=== Ribbon and ring ===
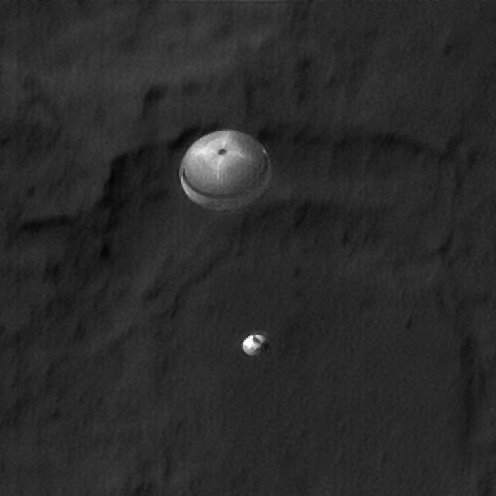
The Mars Science Laboratory capsule, carrying the Mars rover Curiosity, descending under its supersonic disk-gap-band parachute.

Ribbon and ring parachutes have similarities to annular designs. They are frequently designed to deploy at supersonic speeds. A conventional parachute would instantly burst upon opening and be shredded at such speeds. Ribbon parachutes have a ring-shaped canopy, often with a large hole in the centre to release the pressure. Sometimes the ring is broken into ribbons connected by ropes to leak air even more. These large leaks lower the stress on the parachute so it does not burst or shred when it opens. Ribbon parachutes made of Kevlar are used on nuclear bombs, such as the B61 and B83.

=== Ram-air ===
The principle of the Ram-Air Multicell Airfoil was conceived in 1963 by Canadian Domina "Dom" C. Jalbert, but serious problems had to be solved before a ram-air canopy could be marketed to the sport parachuting community. Ram-air parafoils are steerable (as are most canopies used for sport parachuting), and have two layers of fabric—top and bottom—connected by airfoil-shaped fabric ribs to form "cells". The cells fill with higher-pressure air from vents that face forward on the leading edge of the airfoil. The fabric is shaped and the parachute lines trimmed under load such that the ballooning fabric inflates into an airfoil shape. This airfoil is sometimes maintained by use of fabric one-way valves called airlocks. "The first jump of this canopy (a Jalbert Parafoil) was made by International Skydiving Hall of Fame member Paul 'Pop' Poppenhager."

==== Varieties ====
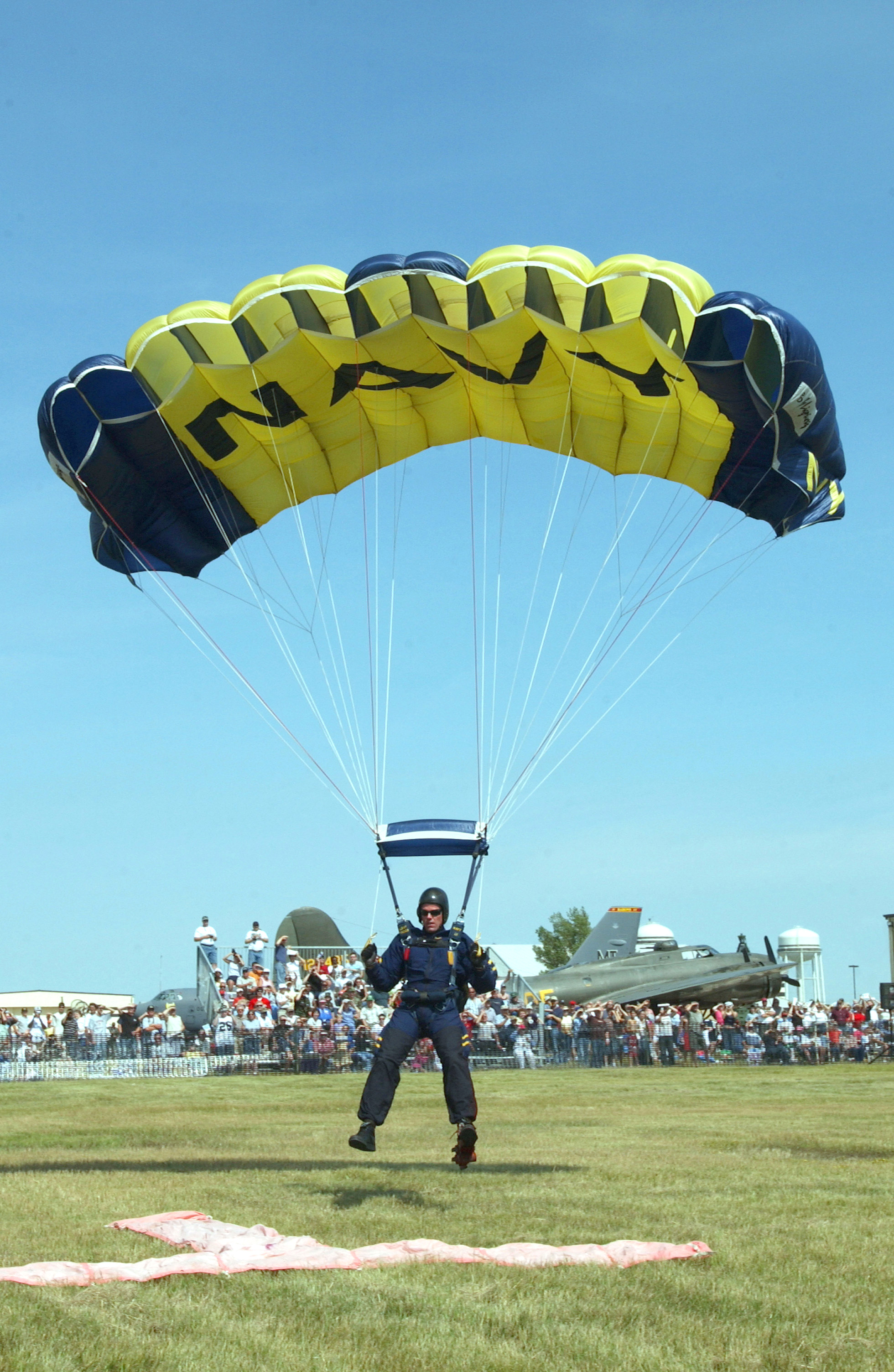
A United States Navy Parachute Team "Leap Frogs" jumper landing a "square" ram-air parachute.

Personal ram-air parachutes are loosely divided into two varieties—rectangular or tapered—commonly called "squares" or "ellipticals", respectively. Medium-performance canopies (reserve-, BASE-, canopy formation-, and accuracy-type) are usually rectangular. High-performance, ram-air parachutes have a slightly tapered shape to their leading and/or trailing edges when viewed in plan form, and are known as ellipticals. Sometimes all the taper is on the leading edge (front), and sometimes in the trailing edge (tail).

Ellipticals are usually used only by sport parachutists. They often have smaller, more numerous fabric cells and are shallower in profile. Their canopies can be anywhere from slightly elliptical to highly elliptical, indicating the amount of taper in the canopy design, which is often an indicator of the responsiveness of the canopy to control input for a given wing loading, and of the level of experience required to pilot the canopy safely.

The rectangular parachute designs tend to look like square, inflatable air mattresses with open front ends. They are generally safer to operate because they are less prone to dive rapidly with relatively small control inputs, they are usually flown with lower wing loadings per square foot of area, and they glide more slowly. They typically have a lower glide ratio.

Wing loading of parachutes is measured similarly to that of aircraft, comparing exit weight to area of parachute fabric. Typical wing loading for students, accuracy competitors, and BASE jumpers is less than 5 kilograms per square metre (1.0 lb/sq ft) – often 3.5 kilograms per square metre (0.72 lb/sq ft) or less. Most student skydivers fly with wing loading below 5 kilograms per square metre (1.0 lb/sq ft). Most sport jumpers fly with wing loading between 5 and 7 kilograms per square metre (1.0 and 1.4 lb/sq ft), but many interested in performance landings exceed this wing loading. Professional canopy pilots compete with wing loading of 10 kilograms per square metre (2.0 lb/sq ft) to over 15 kilograms per square metre (3.1 lb/sq ft). While ram-air parachutes with wing loading higher than 20 kilograms per square metre (4.1 lb/sq ft) have been landed, this is strictly the realm of professional test jumpers. Luigi Cani's Project 34 successfully landed a 3.2-square-metre (34 ft^{2}) canopy.

Smaller parachutes tend to fly faster for the same load, and ellipticals respond faster to control input. Therefore, small, elliptical designs are often chosen by experienced canopy pilots for the thrilling flying they provide. Flying a fast elliptical requires much more skill and experience. Fast ellipticals are also considerably more dangerous to land. With high-performance elliptical canopies, nuisance malfunctions can be much more serious than with a square design, and may quickly escalate into emergencies. Flying highly loaded, elliptical canopies is a major contributing factor in many skydiving accidents, although advanced training programs are helping to reduce this danger.

High-speed, cross-braced parachutes, such as the Velocity, VX, XAOS, and Sensei, have given birth to a new branch of sport parachuting called swooping. A race course is set up in the landing area for expert pilots to measure the distance they are able to fly past the 1.5-metre-tall (4.9 ft) entry gate. Current world records exceed 180 metres (590 ft).

Aspect ratio is another way to measure ram-air parachutes. Aspect ratios of parachutes are measured the same way as aircraft wings, by comparing span with chord. Low aspect ratio parachutes, i.e., span 1.8 times the chord, are now limited to precision landing competitions. Popular precision landing parachutes include Jalbert (now NAA) Para-Foils and John Eiff's series of Challenger Classics. While low aspect ratio parachutes tend to be extremely stable, with gentle stall characteristics, they suffer from steep glide ratios and a small tolerance, or sweet spot, for timing the landing flare.

Because of their predictable opening characteristics, parachutes with a medium aspect ratio around 2.1 are widely used for reserves, BASE, and canopy formation competition. Most medium aspect ratio parachutes have seven cells.

High aspect ratio parachutes have the flattest glide and the largest tolerance for timing the landing flare, but the least predictable openings. An aspect ratio of 2.7 is about the upper limit for parachutes. High aspect ratio canopies typically have nine or more cells. All reserve ram-air parachutes are of the square variety, because of the greater reliability, and the less-demanding handling characteristics.

==== General characteristics ====
Main parachutes used by skydivers today are designed to open softly. Overly rapid deployment was an early problem with ram-air designs. The primary innovation that slows the deployment of a ram-air canopy is the slider; a small rectangular piece of fabric with a grommet near each corner. Four collections of lines go through the grommets to the risers (risers are strips of webbing joining the harness and the rigging lines of a parachute). During deployment, the slider slides down from the canopy to just above the risers. The slider is slowed by air resistance as it descends and reduces the rate at which the lines can spread. This reduces the speed at which the canopy can open and inflate.

At the same time, the overall design of a parachute still has a significant influence on the deployment speed. Modern sport parachutes' deployment speeds vary considerably. Most modern parachutes open comfortably, but individual skydivers may prefer harsher deployment.

The deployment process is inherently chaotic. Rapid deployments can still occur even with well-behaved canopies. On rare occasions, deployment can even be so rapid that the jumper suffers bruising, injury, or death. Reducing the amount of fabric decreases the air resistance. This can be done by making the slider smaller, inserting a mesh panel, or cutting a hole in the slider.

== Parachute opening ==
A parchute opens in three stages, activation, deployment and inflation.

Activation of a parachute is accomplished in one of three ways, throwing the pilot chute, pulling the ripcord (skydiving) or by static line.

Activation of most modern sport main parachutes in freefall is normally accomplished by manually releasing (throwing) a pull out or throw out pilot chute into the airstream which catches air and pulls out the main parachute deployment bag. The deployment stage begins when the pilot-chute pulls the deployment bag from the container extending the parachute lines, the deployment bag then opens and the canopy starts to inflate. A rectangular piece of fabric called the "slider" slows and controls the inflation of the parachute. During a normal deployment, a skydiver will generally experience a few seconds of intense deceleration, in the realm of 3 to 4 g, while the parachute slows the descent from 190 km/h (120 mph) to approximately 28 km/h (17 mph). The normal opening sequence takes approximately three to four seconds.

Throw-out pilot-chute pouches are usually positioned at the bottom of the container (B.O.C.) but older harnesses often have leg-mounted pouches(R.O.L.). The latter are safe for flat-flying, but often unsuitable for freestyle or head-down flying.

In a typical civilian sport parachute system, the pilot-chute is connected to a line known as the "bridle", which in turn is attached to a small deployment bag that contains the folded parachute and the canopy suspension lines, which are stowed with rubber bands. At the bottom of the container that holds the deployment bag a closing loop on the container and closing pin on the bridle hold the container closed.

Animation of 3-ring release system used by a skydiver to cut away the main parachute. It utilizes a mechanical advantage of 200 to 1.

If a skydiver experiences a malfunction of their main parachute which they cannot correct, they pull a "cut-away" handle on the front right-hand side of their harness (on the chest) which will release the main canopy from the harness utilizing the 3-ring release system. Once free from the malfunctioning main canopy, the reserve canopy can be activated manually by pulling a second handle, (commonly called a ripcord) on the front left harness which releases a spring loaded pilot chute. Some containers are fitted with a connecting line from the main to reserve parachutes – known as a reserve static line (RSL) – which pulls open the reserve container faster than a manual release could. Whichever method is used, a spring-loaded pilot-chute then extracts the reserve parachute from the upper half of the container then the opening sequence of the reserve is the same except the reserve deployment bag(free bag)and pilot chute do not remain attached.

== Safety ==
A parachute is carefully folded, or "packed" to ensure that it will open reliably. If a parachute is not packed properly it can result in a malfunction where the main parachute fails to deploy correctly or fully. In the United States and many developed countries, emergency and reserve parachutes are packed by "riggers" who must be trained and certified according to legal standards. Sport skydivers are always trained to pack their own primary "main" parachutes.

Exact numbers are difficult to estimate because parachute design, maintenance, loading, packing technique and operator experience all have a significant impact on malfunction rates. Approximately one in a thousand sport main parachute openings malfunctions, requiring the use of the reserve parachute, although some skydivers have many thousands of jumps and never needed to use their reserve parachute.

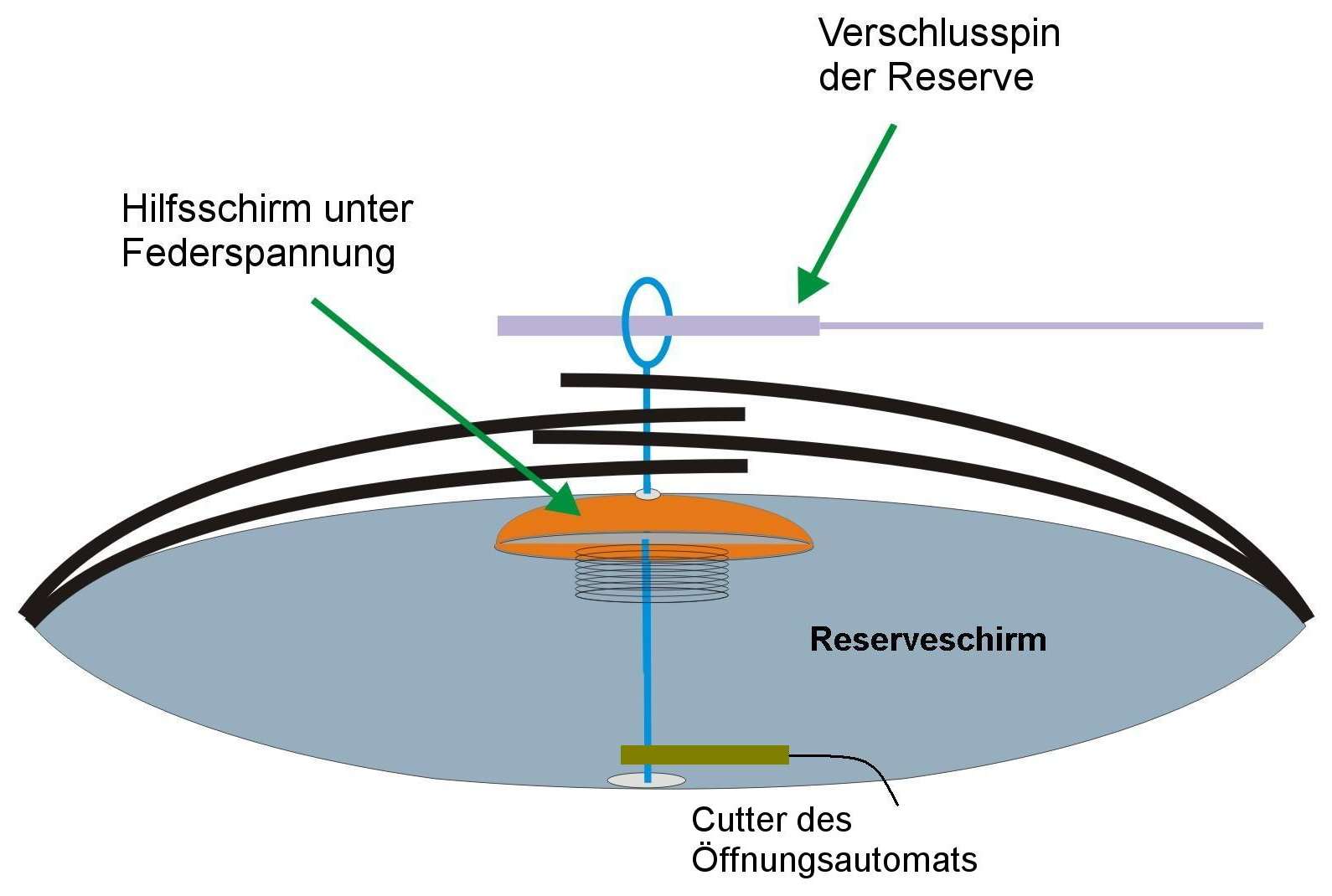
Schematic cartoon of reserve canopy setup

Reserve parachutes are packed and deployed somewhat differently. They are also designed more conservatively, favouring reliability over responsiveness and are built and tested to more exacting standards, making them more reliable than main parachutes. Regulated inspection intervals, coupled with significantly less use contributes to reliability as wear on some components can adversely affect reliability. The safety advantage of a reserve parachute comes from the small probability of a main malfunction being multiplied by the even smaller probability of a reserve malfunction. This yields an even smaller probability of a double malfunction, although there is also a small possibility of a malfunctioning main parachute not being able to be released and thus interfering with the reserve parachute. In the United States, the 2017 average fatality rate is recorded to be 1 in 133,571 jumps.

Injuries and fatalities in sport skydiving are possible even under a fully functional main parachute, such as may occur if the skydiver makes an error in judgment while flying the canopy which results in a high-speed impact either with the ground or with a hazard on the ground, which might otherwise have been avoided, or results in collision with another skydiver under canopy.

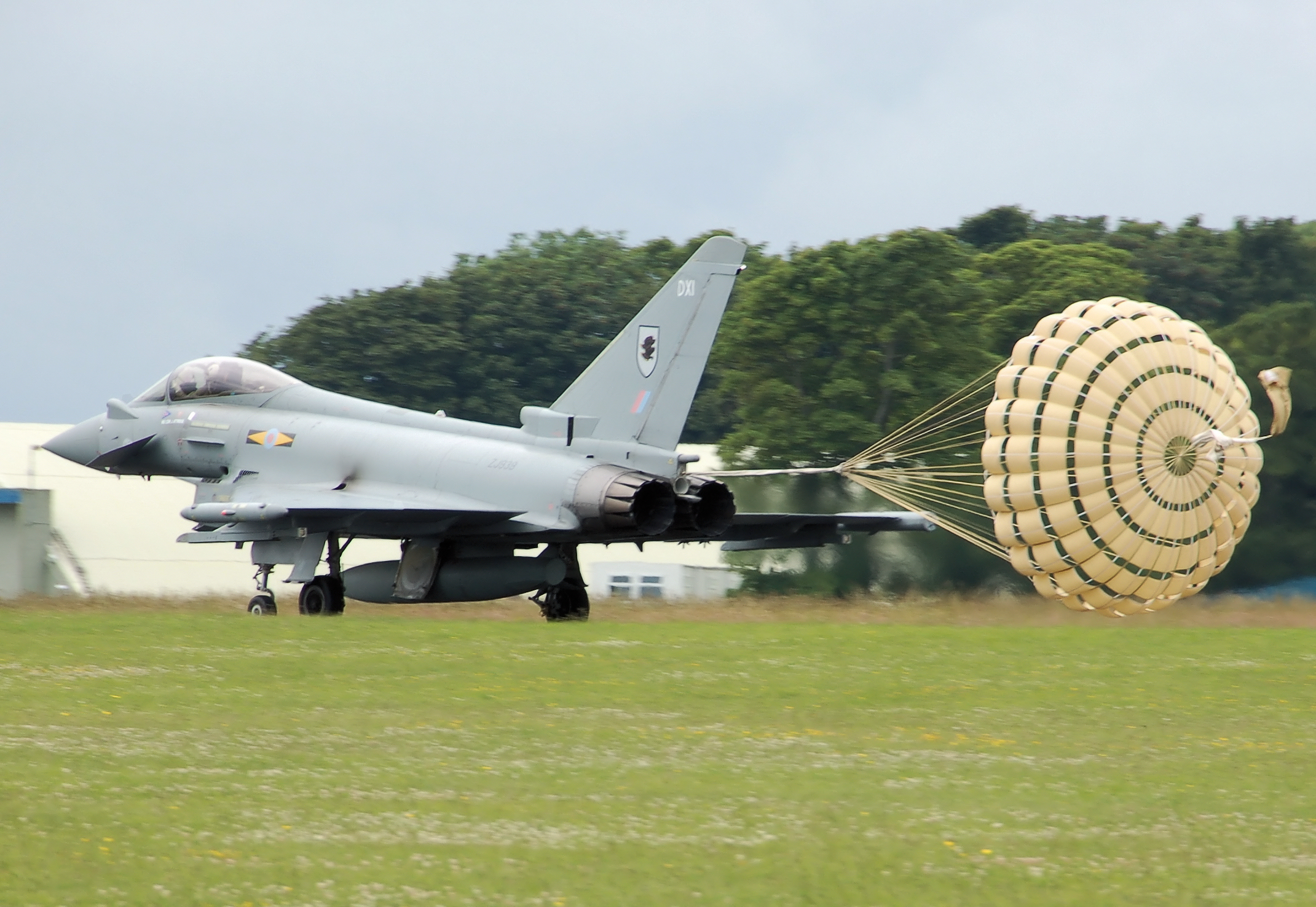
RAF Typhoon using a drogue parachute for braking after landing.

Mishap and human error in exiting the aircraft can compromise safety. Video shows a botched exit resulting in premature deployment and impact with aircraft body.

== Malfunctions ==
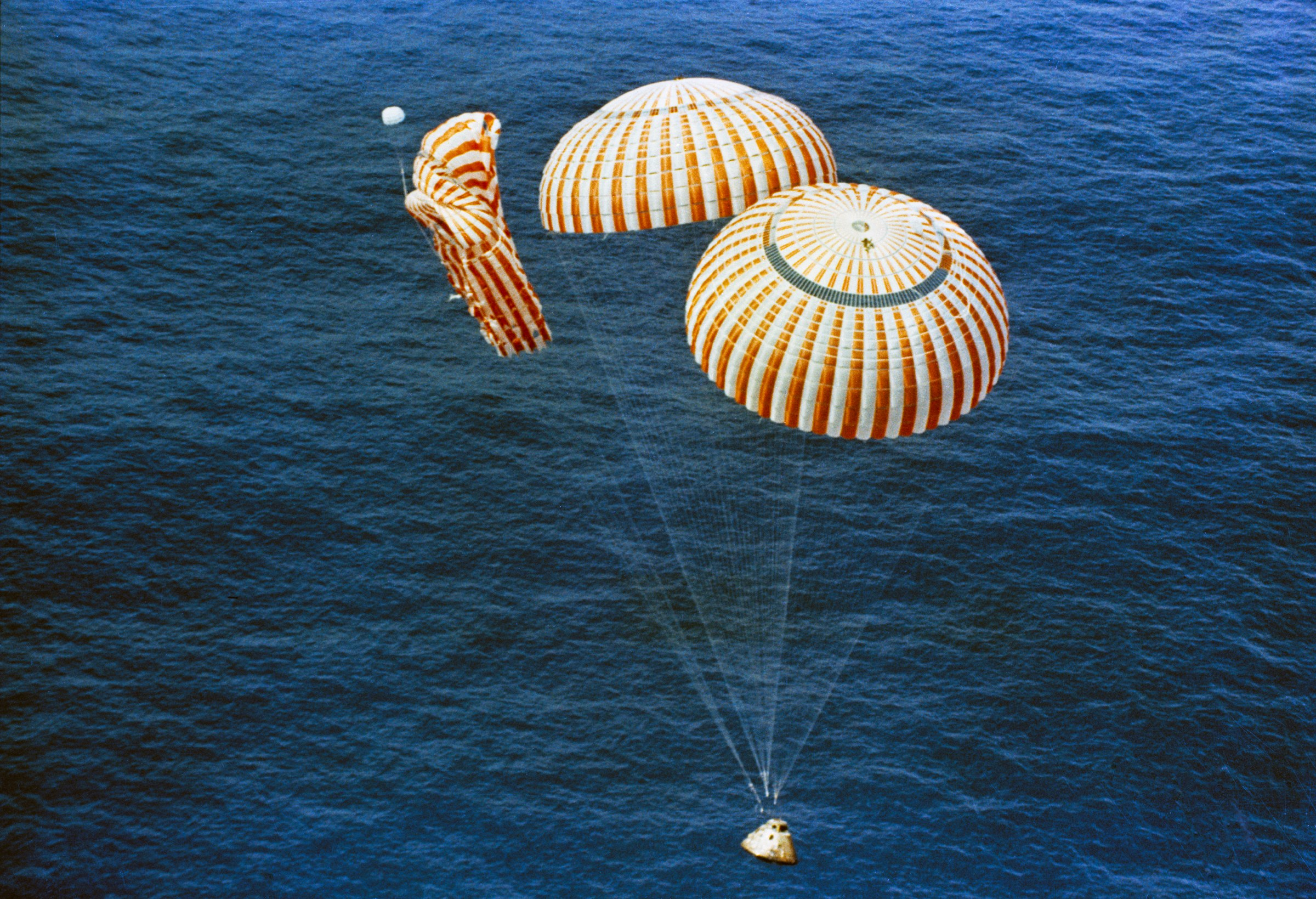
The Apollo 15 spacecraft landed safely despite a parachute line failure in 1971.

Below are listed the malfunctions specific to round parachutes:

- A "Mae West" or "blown periphery" is a type of round parachute malfunction that contorts the shape of the canopy into the outward appearance of a large brassiere, named after the generous proportions of the late actress Mae West. The column of nylon fabric, buffeted by the wind, rapidly heats from friction and opposite sides of the canopy can fuse together in a narrow region, removing any chance of it opening fully.
- A "streamer" is the main chute which becomes entangled in its lines and fails to deploy, taking the shape of a paper streamer. The parachutist cuts it away to provide space and clean air for deploying the reserve.
- An "inversion" occurs when one skirt of the canopy blows between the suspension lines on the opposite side of the parachute and then catches air. That portion then forms a secondary lobe with the canopy inverted. The secondary lobe grows until the canopy turns completely inside out.
- A "barber's pole" describes having a tangle of lines behind the jumper's head, who cuts away the main and opens his reserve.
- The "horseshoe" is an out-of-sequence deployment, when the parachute lines and bag are released before the bag drogue and bridle. This can cause the lines to become tangled or a situation where the parachute drogue is not released from the container.
- "Jumper-In-Tow" involves a static line that does not disconnect, resulting in a jumper being towed behind the aircraft.

== Uses ==
In addition to the use of a parachute to slow the descent of a person or object, a drogue parachute is used to aid horizontal deceleration of a land or air vehicle, including fixed-wing aircraft and drag racers, provide stability, as to assist certain types of light aircraft in distress, tandem free-fall; and as a pilot triggering deployment of a larger parachute.

Parachutes are also used as play equipment.

== Traveling with a parachute ==
When traveling by plane, parachutes' owners may not want to put their parachute in the baggage hold in order to avoid possible deterioration due to possible incorrect handling by airport operators.

Almost all parachutes contain an automatic activation device (AAD), thus bringing a parachute to the plane's cabin might cause issues when going through airport security. AADs can contain either void or pyrotechnic load, and the rest of the parachute also consists of several very uncommon metallic parts and cables, all of which could trigger scanners of the security screening.

In order to justify the presence of "suspicious" content inside the parachute (explosive, vacuum, metal pieces, cables), travelers are encouraged to announce that they are traveling with a parachute when they buy their airplane ticket, and to produce the following documents when asked by the airport security's staff:

- The AAD's explanation card that shows and describes what is seen on X-ray monitors
- Documents from a country, airplane company, or airport officials themselves, that denote the exclusion of such devices from the forbidden items
- The parachute's constructor book detailing the anatomy of the whole bag. Similarly to the AAD's card, it can help showing the purpose of all what could raise awareness of the staff

National skydiving associations usually list on their websites a piece of advice concerning this matter.

== See also ==
- Airdrop
- Ballistic parachute
- Cirrus Airframe Parachute System
- Ejection seat
- Extreme sport
- Free fall
- Parachute landing fall
- Parachuting
- Paragliding

== Sources ==
- White, Lynn (July 1968). "The Invention of the Parachute". Technology and Culture. 9 (3): 462–467. doi:10.2307/3101655. JSTOR 3101655. S2CID 111425847.
