= Pilot chute =

Type of parachute

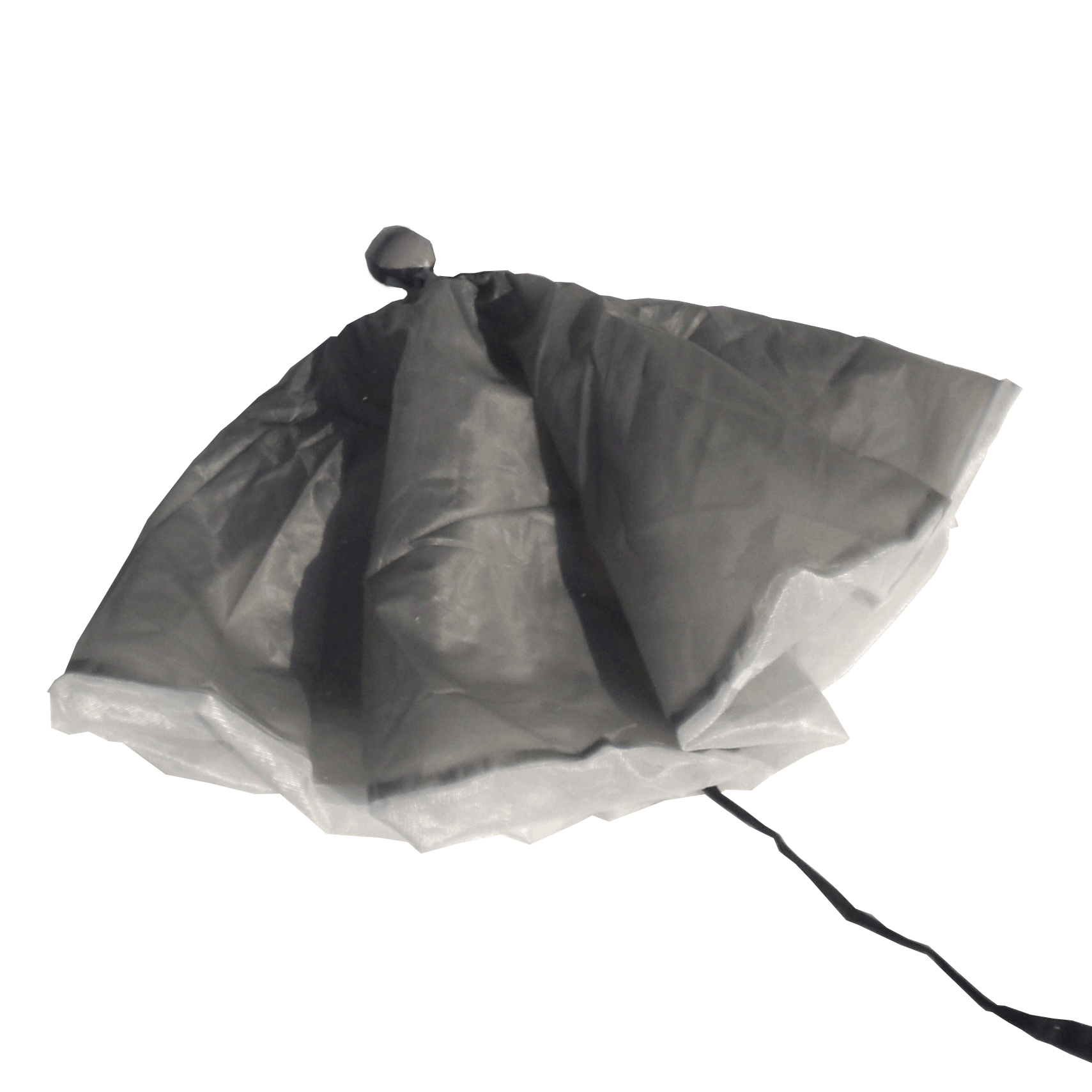
Throw-out pilot chute

A pilot chute is a small auxiliary parachute used to deploy the main or reserve parachute. The pilot chute is connected by a bridle to the deployment bag containing the parachute. Pilot chutes are a critical component of all modern skydiving and BASE jumping gear. Pilot chutes are also used as a component of spacecraft such as NASA's Orion.

== Deployment methods ==
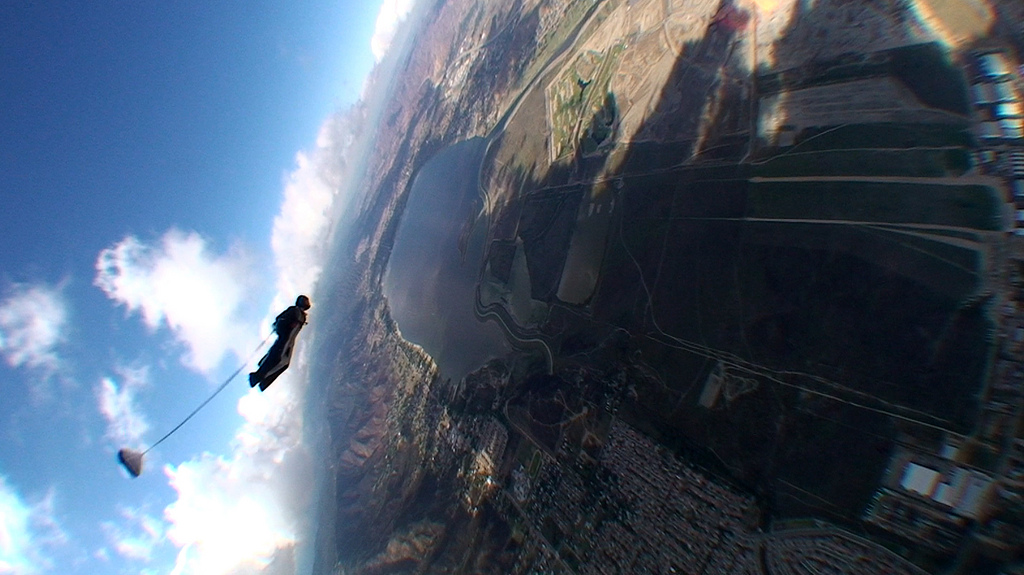
Pilot chute deployment

=== Spring-loaded ===
The spring-loaded pilot chute is used in conjunction with a ripcord. When the user pulls the ripcord, the container opens, allowing the pilot chute compressed inside and loaded with a large spring inside it to jump out. Spring-loaded pilot chutes are mainly used to deploy reserve parachutes. They are often also used to deploy the main parachute on skydiving students' parachute equipment. They are also commonly used in drogue parachutes in cars or in planes such as the B52 Bomber.

=== Pull-out ===
Pull-out and throw-out pilot chutes are identical in construction, with the difference being in their connection to the deployment handle and to the bridle, as well as in the way they are packed. With the pull-out system, the pilot chute is packed inside the container. The activation handle is attached to a lanyard, which in turn is attached to the closing pin. The lanyard is also attached to base of the pilot chute, at the point of connection to the bridle. When the user pulls the deployment handle, the closing pin is pulled, opening the container. Continuing the pull, the user pulls the pilot chute out of the container and into the airstream, at which point the pilot chute inflates and pulls the main parachute out of the container.

=== Throw-out ===
The throw-out pilot chute is the most popular type in use today. The pilot chute is packed in a pouch at the bottom of the container (the B.O.C. pouch). The handle is attached to the apex of the pilot chute. When the user grabs the handle and throws the pilot chute into the airstream, the bridle extends, pulling the closing pin and opening the container; as the pilot chute continues in the airstream it extracts the deployment bag containing the main parachute from the container. The pull-out pilot chute and the throw-out pilot chute were both invented by Bill Booth.

=== Drogues ===
Drogues used on tandem-systems are basically large throw-out pilot chutes, but the bridle is anchored on the container with a release system. When the user throws the drogue, the drogue inflates and the bridle extends. The deployed drogue slows down the free-fall speed of the tandem pair. When the user wants to open the parachute, they pull a ripcord, releasing the bridle and allowing the drogue to open the main container.

== Types ==
=== Collapsible ===
With the advent of smaller, higher-performance canopies, the drag induced by trailing a pilot chute behind a canopy has become a significant concern. To reduce this drag, some pilot chute designs of the Pull-out and Throw-out variety are collapsible. Once deployment of the parachute has occurred a kill line running up the center of the pilot chute bridle becomes loaded. This kill line pulls down on the apex of the pilot chute collapsing it and greatly reducing its drag on the canopy.

Some designs replace the kill line with a fixed length of shock cord, which stretches when the pilot chute is moving quickly, allowing it to inflate. When the pilot chute slows down (after opening a canopy, for example) the shock cord retracts, killing the pilot chute. While this avoids the possibility of pilot-chute-in-tow malfunction due to an un-cocked pilot chute, it has the disadvantage of requiring significant airspeed to operate. This could cause a delayed deployment if used for a BASE or balloon jump, or any other jump with a low-speed deployment. This type may also begin to re-inflate behind a highly loaded, fast moving canopy, negating the usefulness of a collapsible pilot chute.

=== Vented ===
Pilot chutes for BASE jumping gear are typically larger than skydiving pilot chutes, and often include air vents on the surface. Research on the development of early round parachutes showed that vents can increase stability and reduce oscillation of the parachute. BASE jumpers often use pilot chutes with either apex vents, or ring vents.

== See also ==
- Index of aviation articles
- Ballistic parachute
- Cirrus Airframe Parachute System
- Drogue parachute
- Paragliding
- Parachute
- Parachute landing fall
- Parachuting
- Rogallo wing
