= James Floyd Smith =

American Test Pilot
Parachute Manufacturer

- Smith circa 1915 in San Diego
- Born: October 17, 1884; Geneseo, Illinois, US
- Died: April 18, 1956 (aged 71); San Diego, California, US
- Resting place: Portal of Folded Wings
- Education: Public schools in Union, Oregon and San Diego, California
- Occupations: Engineer; Instructor Pilot; Test Pilot; Parachute Manufacturer
- Employer(s): Glenn Martin; Smith Parachute Company
- Known for: Aviation pioneer Parachute
- Spouse: Hilder F. Youngberg(1890-1977)
- Children: 2
- Awards: Medal of Merit from the Aero Club of America

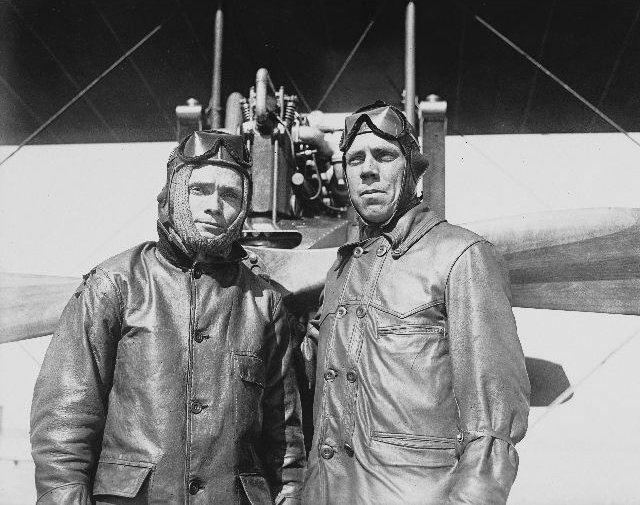
Albert Smith on the left, James Floyd Smith (1884–1956) on the right, circa 1915 in San Diego

James Floyd Smith (17 October 1884 – 18 April 1956) was an American inventor, aviation pioneer, and parachute manufacturer. With borrowed money, he built, then taught himself to fly his own airplane.

He worked as a flight instructor and test pilot for Glenn L. Martin at Bennett's bean field, which became LAX. From San Diego in 1916, Smith won the Aero Club of America's Medal of Merit by setting three altitude records, flying a Martin S seaplane reaching that aircraft's ceiling of 12,333 feet. During World War I, he formed the Floyd Smith Aerial Equipment Company in San Diego, California. In May 1920, he won a patent for the first back pack, free fall type, ripcord operated parachute, designed in response to his wife Hilder Florentina Smith's near fatal static line jump in 1914. Smith's original ripcord parachute is on display at the National Museum of the United States Air Force at Dayton, Ohio.

== Biography ==
Smith was born in Geneseo, Illinois, on 17 October 1884, his family then moved to Union, Oregon. Floyd was a cowboy, machinist, orange grower, sugar factory worker, and flying circus trapeze artist with the Flying Sylvesters. On 11 May 1907 he married his Flying Sylvesters daredevil co-star Hilder Florentina Youngberg of Galesburg, Illinois.

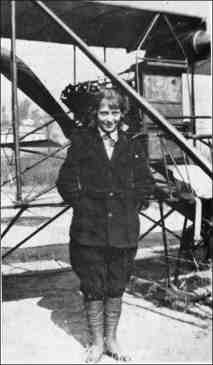
Hilder Florentina Youngber Smith circa 1914 1915

They had two sons Sylvester Smith (1908–1919) and Prevost Vedrines Smith (1913–1991) aka Prevost Floyd Smith. In 1919 at age 11, Sylvester was tragically killed by a car in Chicago.

With the help of Hilder and Frank Shaw, Floyd built his own airplane and soloed it 1 Jun 1912. After the Sylvesters, in 1915, Floyd Smith worked for Glenn L. Martin Company as a mechanic and test pilot. He then started the Floyd Smith Aerial Equipment Company as its founder. Recruited for the US Army parachute design team at McCook Field, Smith entered his own design into the Army's best parachute competition enlisting a dress making company, the Mitchell Brothers of Chicago, to manufacture test chutes. In the 1920s working with Switlik Parachute Company of Trenton, New Jersey, he designed a new rip cord and parachute pack with improved function and cost(U.S. Patent No. 1,755,414 “Floyd Smith Safety Pack.”) Smith also invented the “Floyd Smith Safety Seat” for Switlik (U.S. Patent No. 1,779,338). His Safety Seat had an attached parachute and could be dropped through the bottom of an airplane's fuselage in an emergency. In 1930, the family was living in Morrisville, Bucks County, Pennsylvania, and Floyd worked as an engineer.

In 1938, Smith helped start and run the Pioneer Parachute Company of Manchester, Connecticut, working as vice president and chief engineer. Due to WWII shortages, nylon replaced silk for the main chute. Adeline Gray made a demonstration jump to prove to the Army that it worked. By 1942, Pioneer was the largest producer of nylon parachutes in the world. At the peak, 3,000 employees made 300 parachutes each day, making Pioneer one of the largest suppliers for American servicemen who jumped behind enemy lines on D-Day. After working several years together at Pioneer, in 1947, Floyd and son Prevost Smith founded the Smith Parachute Company, at Gillespie Field in San Diego. After Floyd's passing in 1956, and the company renamed Prevost F. Smith Parachute Company continued to innovate parachute design and manufacturing. Prevost Smith made chutes for astronauts, military weapons drops, the US Navy, the USAF, and large defense contractors.

Floyd died on April 18, 1956, in San Diego, California, of cancer. He is buried in the Portal of Folded Wings Shrine to Aviation.

In 2009, Floyd Smith was awarded the Parachute Industry Association's Don Beck Memorial Achievement Award.

== Patent ==
In April 1914, after his wife Hilder's near fatal static line jump, Smith worked to improve parachute design. A patent, assigned to the Floyd Smith Aerial Equipment Company of San Diego, California, was filed on July 27, 1918, and issued May 18, 1920, for Smith's parachute. In September 1918, General Billy Mitchell directed that a team evaluate available parachutes and identify the best chute. Mitchell picked Glenn Martin test pilot and former flying circus daredevil Floyd Smith. Smith added motor mechanic Guy Ball to his two-man team. After the WWI Armistice, Smith's team came under command of Major E.L. Hoffman who added several other civilians including: Floyd Smith, Guy Ball, show-jumper Harry Eibe, Army parachutist Ralph Bottreil, engineers James Russell and Jimmy Higgins. The newly reorganized team tested 17 parachute designs including: static line designs of Broadwick, Stevens, Ors, Kiefer Kline, Otto Heinecke, Leslie Irvin, Omaha Tent Company, and Floyd Smith. The first tests, using dummies, favored Floyd Smith's parachute design. This winning design was further developed and merged key features into the "Type A" parachute: a soft pack worn on the back; a rip cord to deploy the parachute; and a spring-assisted pilot chute to aid in main parachute deployment. Conservative Major Hoffman and others believed the free-fall was dangerous and that a jumper might blackout before pulling the ripcord. Aerial circus jumpers Floyd Smith and Leslie Irvin convinced Hoffman to test the Type A with Irvin volunteering to jump and Smith piloting the test.

On 28 April 1919 using the "Type A" 28-foot backpack parachute, volunteer Leslie Irvin, flying in a Smith piloted de Havilland DH9 biplane at 100 mph and 1500 feet above the ground, jumped (with a backup chute strapped to his chest) and manually pulled the ripcord fully deploying his chute at 1000 feet. The Parachute Board determined the backpack chute was crowding the cockpit, a redesign moved the parachute down the pilots back becoming the "seat style" chute. The McCook Field team tested the Type A parachute with over 1000 jumps. These successful tests resulted in the Army requiring parachute use on all Air Service flights.

An early brochure of the Irving Air Chute Company credits William O'Connor 24 August 1920 at McCook Field as the first person to be saved by an Irving parachute, yet this was unrecognized. On 20 October 1922, Lieutenant Harold R. Harris, chief of the McCook Field Flying Station, jumped from a disabled Loening PW-2A high wing monoplane fighter. Harris' lifesaving chute was mounted on the wall of McCook's parachute lab where the Dayton Herald's aviation editor Maurice Hutton and photographer Verne Timmerman, predicting more jumps in future, suggested that a club should be formed. Two years later, Irvin's company instituted the Caterpillar Club, awarding a gold pin to pilots who successfully bailed out of disabled aircraft using an Irving parachute. The Switlik Parachute Company of Trenton, New Jersey issued both gold and silver caterpillar pins.

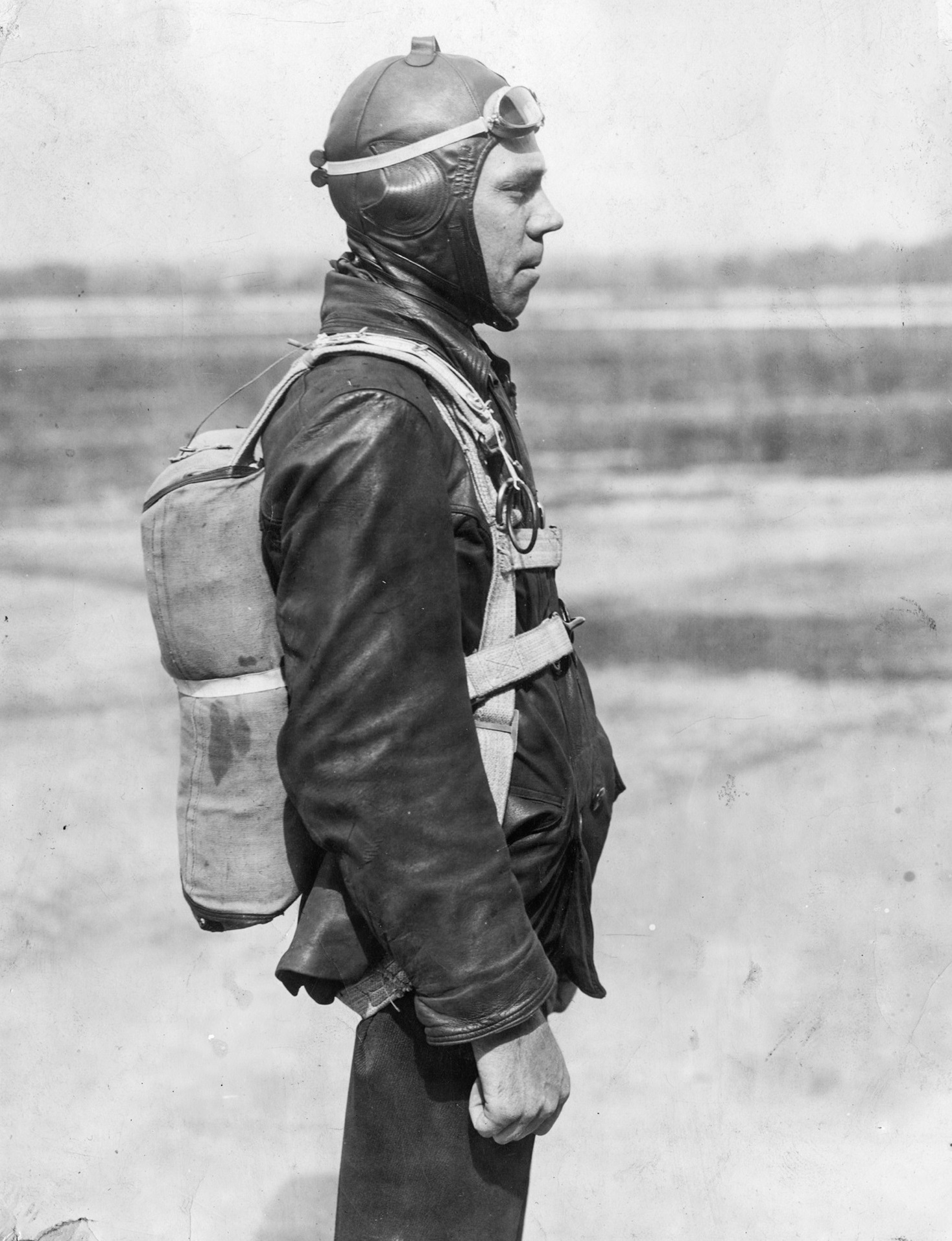
Smith's Type A parachute, May 1919 McCook Field

After Major Hoffman wrote the US Army specifications for the Type A parachute, the Army Air Service placed an order for 300 parachutes from the lowest bidder; Irvin's Irving Air Chute Company. After Irvin lost a patent dispute to Floyd Smith with zero compensation due to US Army parachute orders, the US Government compensated Smith with $3500 to transfer his patent to Irvin's company. Floyd's original 1919 ripcord parachute is on display at the Air Force Museum at Dayton, Ohio. Smith was issued a total of 33 patents.

US Patent: Name, Number, Filed, Issued, Title, Assignee
Floyd Smith Aerial Life Pack	Pat. No. 1,340,423	Filed: 27 July 1918	Issued: 18 May 1920	Title: Parachute	Floyd Smith Aerial Equipment Co., San Diego, California
“Type A”	Pat. No. 1,462,456	Filed: 28 April 1919	Issued: 17 July 1923	Title: Parachute Pack and Harness	Floyd Smith Aerial Equipment Co, later US Govt paid transfer to Irving Air Chute Company

== See also ==
- Albert Leo Stevens
- Hilder Florentina Youngberg
- Charles Broadwick
- Leslie Irvin
- Edward L. Hoffman
- Collier Trophy
- Gleb Kotelnikov

== Sources ==
- Los Angeles Tribune; March 20, 1915; "Bird-Baby" Flies 21 Miles Gazes Down 4500 Ft. on City.
