= Archie Atherton =

American parachutist (1906–1958)

- Born: January 4, 1906; Maquoketa, Iowa, U.S.
- Died: February 16, 1958 (aged 52); Inglewood, California, U.S.
- Occupations: Parachutist; Parachute specialist and inventor
- Notable credit(s): Parachute innovations; U.S. Patent Parachute design

Archibald “Archie” Pell Atherton III (January 4, 1906 – February 16, 1958) was an American pioneering parachutist and inventor of several patented parachute designs. A trailblazer in aviation safety, he is credited as the originator of "spot landing", at one point averaging one parachute drop per day for an entire year.

== Early life ==
Atherton was born in Maquoketa, Iowa on January 4, 1906. The second son of Archibald Pell Atherton II (1868–1940) and Netti Marie Buck (1878–1946) on January 4, 1906. His father was born in Glens Falls, NY, and moved to Cedar Rapids, Iowa in his youth. His mother had paternal French Canadian ancestry. His father was initially a salesman for a sash and door company, before opening a grocery store in Iowa.

== Career ==
At the age of 19, Atherton was mustered into the United States Marine Corps as a Private first class during May 1925, and was based at the Quantico, Virginia. Atherton gained notoriety within the service for developing his own technique of parachute landing.

Upon leaving the marines, he maximized use of this skill, together with his entrepreneurial spirit, contracting with industry T.C. Ryan Aircraft for high-profile jumps from 1928. The Aeronautical Industry publications reported Atherton having completed 81 jumps for marine aviation. He set up a School of Parachuting in 1928 in the San Diego area. By 1930, publications in the United Kingdom were reporting his successes in the industry.

He set up a parachute supply and repair service during the 1930s, and participated in the design of new parachutes for both commercial and military use; some which he patented in his own name throughout the 1940s. In the 1945 records from the Civil Aeronautics Board disclose that he testified as a parachute specialist as part of this organisation's staff.

=== Pioneering jumps ===
He first achieved national notoriety while in the United States Marine Corps for completing the first ever parachute jump into Yosemite National Park in 1926. Two years later the California State Automobile Association publication "Motorland" described Atherton as a rather small man in stature, who leaps overboard with only a 24 feet (7.3 m) silk chute to break his fall.

The year following his Yosemite jump, still active in the U. S. Marine Corps as a Marine Corporal, Atherton demonstrated a high-profile stunt jump to the Assistant Secretary of the Navy, Edward Pearson Warner, at the San Diego Naval Base. Press pictures captured him in mid air at 5,000 feet (1,500 m).

In September 1927 the press described Sergeant Atherton and Chief Petty Officer Bill Dodson as the Babe Ruth and Lou Gehrig of air stage parachute battle. In a joint interview Atherton and Dodson revealed that they made 34 jumps from a high plane and raced one another to the ground from a mile above the earth. Atherton was introduced into the article as a Famous Marine Corps Parachute Jumper, and in his own words describes to the Newspaper Enterprise Association the thrill of jumping out of an airplane, and speeding 90 miles per hour (140 km/h) a half mile above the earth. His plunge from a plane is shown in a series of photographs; at the top of the leap, as his parachute opens, and then upon his final descent. Months later, Atherton retired from service.

=== The Archie Atherton School of Parachute Instruction ===
In April 1928, Time Magazine described Atherton as a crack parachutist of the U. S. Marine Corps, who had opened a private parachute school in San Diego. The first of its kind; the first such site offering an opportunity for thrill seekers to take up parachuting as a new outdoor sport. His proven track record, at the time of the parachute school's inauguration, was having 700 jumps under his belt. This level of notoriety had sparked interest on a national level and he received detailed coverage statewide in the regional press where he is described by one reporter as a Daredevil who opened a new Thrill School. The first articles praising this new chapter in aviation safety originated from the Miami News-Record in March 1928. In order to grow his parachute business, Atherton needed experienced parachutists, and was willing to pay a high rate to meet the demand. He promoted his enterprise by placing a parachutist recruitment advertisement in the March 1928 edition of Flying Magazine aiming to efficiently reach a specialist national audience of potential candidates, as well as promote his business. Within a year he had 135 students.

=== Atherton’s Aircraft Safety Equipment Company and Parachute Service ===
In 1936, he was running another successful enterprise; initially known as the Atherton Parachute Service, it was located within the San Fernando Valley, in the vicinity of Glendale, California. From this site he expanded his business, and acted as a representative for parachute manufacturers, including Switlik parachute Company in New Jersey, a company that continues to be closely involved with the Caterpillar Club. Atherton was drafted in World War II. His US Marine Corps service and parachute experience and specialist knowledge would have been invaluable to the war effort. Upon returning to civilian life, Atherton was involved with the Derry Parachute Company, and was employed as a parachute rigging specialist.

During the 1940s, Atherton's aircraft safety equipment company was now located at 109-A South Central, Glendale. As experienced manufacturers and inspectors of parachutes, his company advertised their pioneer parachute and their inspection, repair and repackaging service. He was a supplier of specialized parachutes for both commercial and military aircraft, and a provider of parachute engineering service and repair for the aircraft manufacturing industry, distributing to California, Arizona and beyond.

== Patents ==
Atherton is recognized as the inventor of a number of parachute designs which he patented in the United States. These patents were primarily filed between 1944 and 1947 and have expired.

Patent	Name	Filed	Issued	Application #
2392448	Parachute	Dec 1, 1944	Jan 08, 1946	US56604844A

== Personal ==
Atherton broke his foot when stepping off a box, with Flying magazine reporting twice his misfortune using the opportunity to highlight the safety of parachute jumping during 1940.

At the age of 52, Atherton was suffering from advanced pulmonary tuberculosis and took his own life with an overdose of barbiturates on February 1, 1958, while at his home in Inglewood, California. He was buried at Glen Haven Memorial Park in Sylmar, California.

== See also ==
- Collier Trophy
- Edward L. Hoffman
- Leslie L. Irvin
- Albert Leo Stevens
- Hilder Florentina Youngberg
- Charles Broadwick
- Hilder Florentina Smith
- Tiny Broadwick
