= Edward L. Hoffman =

American aviation pioneer (1884–1970)

Edward Lincoln Hoffman
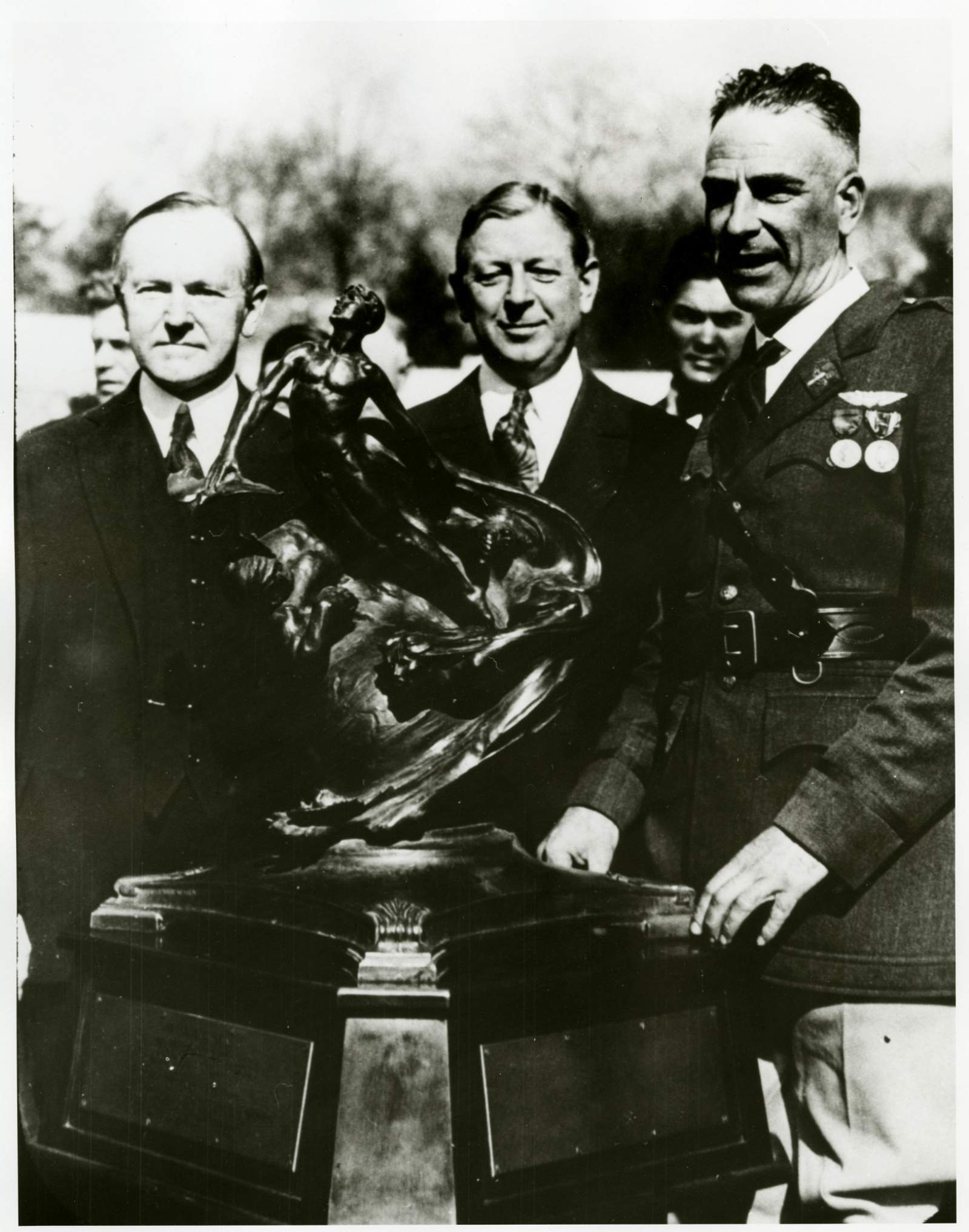
- Calvin Coolidge (left) presenting the 1926 Collier Trophy to Edward L. Hoffman (right). Secretary of War Dwight Davis stands in the center.
- Born: Edward Lincoln Hoffman; December 17, 1884; Davids Island New Rochelle New York, US
- Died: October 6, 1970 (aged 85); San Diego, California, US
- Occupation: Army Officer (1911-1937)
- Employer: United States Army Air Service
- Known for: first practicable parachute
- Spouse: Ruth (born Abt. 1891 in Nebraska)
- Parent(s): William Hoffman; Mary E. Aearn
- Awards: Collier Trophy (1926)

Edward Lincoln Hoffman (1884–1970) was a United States Army Air Service (USAAS) pilot, officer and Engineering Division Chief at McCook Field. With no parachute experience, he formed a team that included aviation pioneers Leslie Irvin and James Floyd Smith which developed the first modern parachute. The 1926 Collier Trophy was awarded to Major E. L. Hoffman, Air Corps for "development of a practical parachute;" the year's greatest achievement in American aviation.

== Early life ==
Born to American Civil War veteran William Hoffman and his wife Mary E Aearn on 17 December 1884 at Fort Slocum, Davids Island, New Rochelle, New York. Edward L. Hoffman after enlisting in the infantry 21 July 1909, commissioned as an officer on 9 October 1911. In 1917 he transferred to the Aviation Section, Signal Corps with assignment as Engineering Division Chief at McCook Field. As Chief, Hoffman's division worked on all aspects of aviation including parachutes, bombsights, and aerial refueling.

== Parachute testing ==
In September 1918, General Billy Mitchell directed that a team evaluate available parachutes and identify the best chute. Mitchell picked Glenn Martin test pilot and former flying circus daredevil Floyd Smith. Smith added motor mechanic Guy M. Ball to his two-man team. After the WWI Armistice, Smith's team came under command of Major Hoffman who formed the Parachute Board adding several other civilians including: Floyd Smith, Guy Ball, show-jumper Harry Eibe, Army parachutist Sgt Ralph Bottreil, engineers James M. Russell and James J. Higgins. The newly reorganized team tested 17 parachute designs including: static line designs of Broadwick, Stevens, Ors, Kiefer Kline, Otto Heinecke, Leslie Irvin, Omaha Tent Company, and Floyd Smith. The first tests, using dummies, favored Floyd Smith's parachute design. This winning design was further developed and merged key features into the "Type A" parachute: a soft pack worn on the back; a rip cord to deploy the parachute; and a spring assisted pilot chute to aid in main parachute deployment. Conservative Major Hoffman and others believed the free-fall was dangerous and that a jumper might blackout before pulling the ripcord. Aerial circus jumpers Floyd Smith and Leslie Irvin convinced Hoffman to test the Type A with Irvin volunteering to jump and Smith piloting the test.

== First free-fall jump ==
On 28 April 1919 using the "Type A" 28 foot backpack parachute, volunteer Leslie Irvin, flying in a Smith piloted de Havilland DH9 biplane at 100 mph and 1500 feet above the ground, jumped (with a backup chute strapped to his chest) and manually pulled the ripcord fully deploying his chute at 1000 feet. Irvin became the first American to jump from an airplane and manually open a parachute in midair. The new chute performed flawlessly, though Irvin broke his ankle on landing. Floyd Smith filed the Type A patent No. 1,462,456 on the same day.

After Irvin's successful first jump, the team lined up to jump the Type A starting with Floyd Smith, then in order Russell, Higgins, and Bottreil. With over 500 static line jumps, Sgt Ralph Bottreil became the first US serviceman to free-fall jump with the Type A chute and was awarded the Distinguished Flying Cross.

The Parachute Board determined the backpack chute was crowding the cockpit, a redesign moved the parachute down the pilots back becoming the "seat style" chute. Hoffman's team tested the Type A parachute with over 1000 jumps. These successful tests resulted in the Army requiring parachute use on all Air Service flights. Hoffman developed the US Army specifications and drawings for this parachute, which the Army Air Service placed an order for 300 parachutes from the lowest bidder: Irvin's Irving Air Chute Company. After losing a patient dispute to Floyd Smith with zero compensation due to US Government parachute orders, the US Government compensated Smith with $3500 to transfer his patient to Irvin's company.

The original 1919 Type A ripcord parachute is on display at the Air Force Museum at Dayton, Ohio. An early brochure of the Irving Air Chute Company credits William O'Connor 24 August 1920 at McCook Field as the first person to be saved by an Irving parachute, yet this was unrecognized. On 20 October 1922, Lieutenant Harold R. Harris, chief of the McCook Field Flying Station, jumped from a disabled Loening PW-2A high wing monoplane fighter. Harris' lifesaving chute was mounted on the wall of McCook's parachute lab where the Dayton Herald's aviation editor Maurice Hutton and photographer Verne Timmerman, predicting more jumps in future, suggested that a club should be formed. Two years later, Irvin's company instituted the Caterpillar Club, awarding a gold pin to pilots who successfully bailed out of disabled aircraft using an Irving parachute. In 1922 Leslie Irvin agreed to give a gold pin to every person whose life was saved by one of his parachutes. At the end of World War II the number of members with the Irvin pins had grown to over 34,000 though the total of people saved by Irvin parachutes is estimated to be 100,000. The Switlik Parachute Company of Trenton, New Jersey issued both gold and silver caterpillar pins.

US President Calvin Coolidge congratulated Major Edward L. Hoffman, Air Corps, on the 1926 Collier Trophy for "development of a practical parachute;" the year's greatest achievement in American aviation.

== Triangle parachute ==
Out-growing McCook Field, in 1927 Hoffman's Parachute Board was moved to Wright Field. Renamed the Parachute and Clothing Branch, Hoffman developed the airborne steerable "Triangle Parachute." Hoffman's branch developed large parachutes utilized to slow bombs and even recover or slow aircraft. Eventually this large parachute work was used in space capsule recovery.

After Wright Field, Hoffman became the commander at Lunken Airport in Cincinnati. His patient for the Triangle chute design was awarded but being designed during military duty was free for public use. Hoffman started the Triangle Parachute Company in Cincinnati. The US Army purchased some triangle parachutes but phased them out due to difficulty packing and expense which forced the Triangle Parachute Company to close. On 8 June 1936, following discussion the year before on the House floor, Hoffman received a reprimand from the United States Secretary of War George Dern for concealing connections to the Safe Aircraft Inc. and the Triangle Parachute Company in Cincinnati.

On 1 June 1937, retiring as a Lieutenant Colonel, he moved his family to San Diego entering into the parachute manufacturing business with Jimmy Russell forming Hoffman & Russell in 1938. Their new venture developed very large parachutes able to return entire disabled aircraft safely to earth. Together they were awarded a patient to reduce parachute oscillations and they successfully tested a 60-foot diameter parachutes with designs for a 225-foot chute. Ahead of their time, Russell left the partnership to work at Standard Parachute Corporation.

Edward L. Hoffman lived with his wife Ruth in San Diego, California where he died on 6 October 1970.

== See also ==
- Albert Leo Stevens
- Charles Broadwick
- Leslie Irvin
- James Floyd Smith
- Collier Trophy
- Gleb Kotelnikov
