= Leslie L. Irvin =

American parachutist

Leslie Leroy Irvin
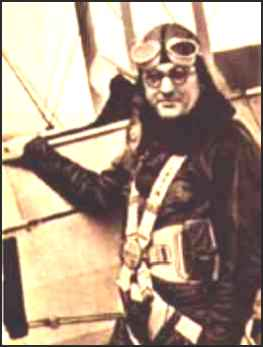
- Irvin wearing an early Irvin Air Chute (not Type A) seat pack on a single-point quick release harness
- Born: Leslie Leroy Irvin; September 10, 1895; Los Angeles, California
- Died: October 9, 1966 (aged 71); Los Angeles, California
- Occupation(s): Parachute manufacturer and parachutist
- Employer: Irving Air Chute Company
- Known for: First premeditated freefall parachute descent & ripcord use
- Spouse: Velda Kerr (1892–1985)
- Awards: British Patent

Leslie Leroy Irvin (September 10, 1895 – October 9, 1966) was a stunt-man for the fledgling Californian film industry. Flying in balloons, he performed using trapeze acrobatics and parachute descents. For the 1914 film Sky High, Irvin made his first jump out of an airplane while flying at 1,000 feet above the ground. In 1918, he developed his own life-saving static line parachute, jumping with it several times and promoting it to the US Army. Irvin joined the Army Air Service's parachute research team at McCook Field near Dayton, Ohio where he made the first premeditated free-fall jump with the modern parachute on April 28, 1919.

== Biography ==
Leslie Leroy Irvin was born on September 10, 1895, in Los Angeles, California. A protégé of Charles Broadwick, the adventurous and athletic Irvin made his first parachute jump at age 16. In 1914, he first jumped from an airplane at 1,000 feet above the ground in a stunt for the movie Sky High. Irvin, while working for the Curtiss Aeroplane Company in Buffalo, developed a 32-foot diameter free-fall parachute, tested it with dummies dropped from Curtis airplanes and applied for a US patent. While in Buffalo, his designs moved from cotton to light weight silk with the help of silk merchant and business partner George Waite. Irvin joined the Army Air Service's parachute research team at McCook Field near Dayton, Ohio which developed the first modern parachute.

After the WWI Armistice, Major E. L. Hoffman of the Army Air Service led an effort to develop an improved parachute for exiting airplanes by bringing together the best elements of multiple parachute designs. Participants included Irvin and James Floyd Smith. The team tested 17 parachute configurations using test dummies. The results favored Smith's parachute design which his company, the Floyd Smith Aerial Equipment Company of San Diego, California, filed a patent for on July 27, 1918. Smith's design was further improved and eventually created the airplane parachute Type-A. The Type A parachute incorporated three key elements:

- storing the parachute in a soft pack worn on the back, as demonstrated by Charles Broadwick in 1906;
- a ripcord for manually deploying the parachute at a safe distance from the airplane, from a design by Albert Leo Stevens; and
- a pilot chute that draws the main canopy from the pack.

On April 28, 1919, using the "Type A" 28 foot backpack parachute, volunteer Leslie Irvin, flying in a Smith piloted de Havilland DH9 biplane at 100 mph and 1500 feet above the ground, jumped (with a backup chute strapped to his chest) and manually pulled the ripcord fully deploying his chute at 1000 feet. Irvin became the first American to jump from an airplane and manually open a parachute in midair. The new chute performed flawlessly, though Irvin broke his ankle on landing. Floyd Smith filed the Type A patent No. 1,462,456 on the same day. The Parachute Board determined the backpack chute was crowding the cockpit, a redesign moved the parachute down the pilots back becoming the "seat style" chute. The McCook Field team tested the Type A parachute with over 1000 jumps. These successful tests resulted in the Army requiring parachute use on all Air Service flights.

Less than two months after Irvin's first freefall jump, the Irving Air Chute Company was formed in Buffalo, New York, the world's first parachute designer and manufacturer. Legend has it that 'Irvin' was inadvertently changed to 'Irving' by a secretary who mistakenly tacked a 'g' on the end of the name, and the company never bothered to correct the mistake until 1970.

Major Hoffman wrote the US Army specifications for the Type A parachute and the Army Air Service placed an order for 300 parachutes from the lowest bidder: Irvin's Irving Air Chute Company. After Irvin lost a patent dispute with zero compensation to Floyd Smith, the US Government compensated Smith with $3500 to transfer his patent to Irvin's company. The original 1919 ripcord parachute is on display at the Air Force Museum at Dayton, Ohio.

An early brochure of the Irving Air Chute Company credits William O'Connor August 24, 1920, at McCook Field as the first person to be saved by an Irving parachute, yet this was unrecognized. On October 20, 1922, Lieutenant Harold R. Harris, chief of the McCook Field Flying Station, jumped from a disabled Loening PW-2A high wing monoplane fighter. Harris' lifesaving chute was mounted on the wall of McCook's parachute lab where the Dayton Herald's aviation editor Maurice Hutton and photographer Verne Timmerman, predicting more jumps in future, suggested that a club should be formed. Two years later, Irvin's company instituted the Caterpillar Club, awarding a gold pin to pilots who successfully bailed out of disabled aircraft using an Irving parachute. In 1922 Leslie Irvin agreed to give a gold pin to every person whose life was saved by one of his parachutes. At the end of World War II the number of members with the Irvin pins had grown to over 34,000 though the total of people saved by Irvin parachutes is estimated to be 100,000. The successor to the original Irvin company still provides pins to people who have made a jump. In addition to the Irvin Air Chute Company, other parachute manufacturers have also issued caterpillar pins for successful jumps. GC Parachutes formed their Gold Club in 1940. The Switlik Parachute Company of Trenton, New Jersey issued both gold and silver caterpillar pins.

Irving Air Chute had become the largest parachute manufacturer in the world. By 1939, 45 foreign countries were using Irving parachutes, including Germany, which had confiscated an Irving plant and bought its patents in 1936.

As aircraft flew at ever increasing altitudes, pilots and aircrew were subject to ever lower temperatures, and Irvin designed and manufactured the classic sheepskin flying jacket to meet aviators' special requirements. Later the company also made car seat belts, slings for cargo handling, and even canning machinery. In 1970, the company finally removed the misnomic 'g' from its name, becoming Irvin Air Chute, and in 1996, changed its name again to Irvin Aerospace Inc. In addition to parachutes, the company (now Airborne Systems) specializes in a diverse range of products for global aerospace and military markets.

British Patent: Name, Number, Filed, Issued, Title
| Parachute | British Patent, 138,059 | Filed: 1920 | Issued: 1920 | Title: Improvements in safety parachute pack device |

Leslie Irvin died in Los Angeles on October 9, 1966.

== See also ==
- Albert Leo Stevens
- Hilder Florentina Youngberg
- Charles Broadwick
- Hilder Florentina Smith
- Edward L. Hoffman
- Collier Trophy
- Gleb Kotelnikov

== Bibliography ==
- Hearn, Peter. Sky High Irvin: The Story of a Parachute Pioneer. London : R. Hale, 1983.
