= Hilder Florentina Smith =

American Test Pilot
Parachute Manufacturer

Hilder Florentina Youngberg Smith
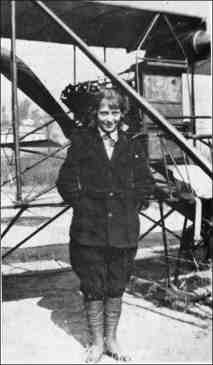
- Smith circa 1914
- Born: Hilder Florentina Youngberg; August 10, 1890; Galesburg, Illinois, US
- Died: January 11, 1977 (aged 86); La Mesa, San Diego, California, US
- Resting place: Portal of Folded Wings
- Education: Public schools
- Occupations: Pilot; Parachutist
- Employer(s): The Flying Sylvesters; Glenn Martin
- Known for: Aviation pioneer
- Spouse: James Floyd Smith
- Children: 2

Hilder Florentina Youngberg Smith (August 10, 1890 – January 11, 1977) was an aerial acrobat, parachutist, and pioneer aviator. She was one of California's first female pilots and the first woman to fly an airplane from LAX. Hilder was a member of a flying aerial team called The Flying Sylvesters.

== Biography ==
Born to Swedish parents Andrew G. Youngberg (1853-1935) and Frida A. Flard (1853-1963) on August 10, 1890, as Hilder Florentina Youngberg. She married James Floyd Smith on May 11, 1907. Together they barnstormed through southern California for five years, with the Flying Sylvesters. In the summer of 1912, when Hilder and Frank Shaw helped Floyd build his own airplane, Floyd added dual controls to fly with Hilder. They had two sons, Sylvester Smith (1908-1919) and Prevost Vedrines Smith (1913–1991) aka Prevost Floyd Smith. In 1919 at age 11, Sylvester was tragically killed by a car in Chicago.

Glenn L. Martin needed a female parachutist to jump into the opening ceremonies of the new Los Angeles Harbor. Hilder had never jumped before but made a deal to jump twice if she could use Martin's airplanes with flight lessons from her husband. In April 1914 she made two parachute jumps using a static line chute. On her second jump climbing from a Glenn Martin piloted airplane correcting for drift on a windy April 1914 day, Hilder, a non-swimmer, was startled by seeing the Los Angeles bay below. Reaching for the cockpit rail, she slipped tumbling from the airplane twisting the parachute lines. Quickly untangling the chute lines, Hilder inflated her chute just in time, landing on the beach. Watching the near disaster, her spouse Floyd Smith vowed to redesign the Broadwick static line parachute to safely operate away from the airplane. Hilder's inspiration spurred Floyd to develop and patent the first freefall or modern parachute.

On June 10, 1914, with flight instruction from her spouse, Hilder Smith made her first solo flight in Martin's airplane. In 1916, with passenger Adele Mosteri, she became the first female pilot to fly out of Bennett's bean field, which became LAX.

Hilder Florentina Smith died on January 11, 1977, in La Mesa, San Diego, California. She is buried at the Portal of Folded Wings Shrine to Aviation in California.

== See also ==
- Albert Leo Stevens
- James Floyd Smith
- Charles Broadwick
- Leslie Irvin
- Edward L. Hoffman
- Collier Trophy
- Gleb Kotelnikov
