= RAPS =

RAPS or Raps may refer to:

- Rapping, spoken or chanted rhyming lyrics
- Ram Air Progression System, a parachuting training method
- Remote-area power supply, an off-the-grid electricity system
- "Raps", a colloquial nickname for the Toronto Raptors
- Reducing and alkalinity producing system used for wastewater treatment
