= Tiny Broadwick =

American female skydiver and stunt performer (1893–1978)

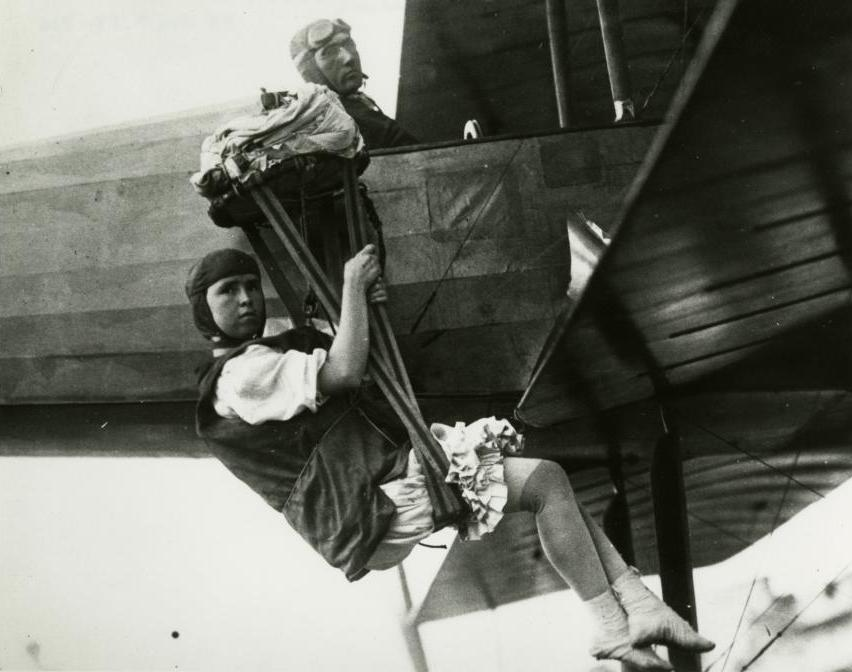
Broadwick ready to drop from a Martin T airplane piloted by Glenn Martin.

Georgia Ann "Tiny" Thompson Broadwick (née Thompson, later Brown; April 8, 1893 – August 25, 1978) was an American pioneering parachutist and the inventor of the ripcord. She was the first woman to jump from an airplane, and the first person to jump from a seaplane.

== Early life, family and education ==
Born to parents George and Emma Ross on April 8, 1893, Georgia Ann Thompson weighed only 3 pounds (1.4 kg). The last of seven daughters, Georgia was given the nickname "Tiny" due to her small size, as she weighed only 85 pounds (39 kg) and was 4 feet 8 inches (1.42 m) tall.

At age 12, Tiny Broadwick had married and, at age 13, had a daughter, Verla Jacobs (later, Poythress) (1906–1985).

== Parachuting career ==
Tiny Broadwick was an abandoned mother working in a cotton mill at age 15, when she saw Charles Broadwick's World Famous Aeronauts parachute from a hot air balloon and decided to join the travelling troupe, leaving her daughter in the care of her parents. She later became Broadwick's adopted daughter to ease travel arrangements, though she has also been referenced as his wife, with her own family later unclear on the relationship. In her early career, she jumped from balloons. Broadwick's wife, Maude, had died on November 2, 1905, performing a jump from a balloon.

Billed as "the doll girl," Tiny Broadwick began performing aerial skydives and stunts while wearing a "life preserver," or parachute, designed by Charles Broadwick, making her first jump out of a hot air balloon on December 28, 1908. The skydiving family traveled around and performed at fairs, carnivals, and parks. The appeal of the Broadwick flying troupe, according to Tiny Broadwick, was that "it was a very neat and fast act."

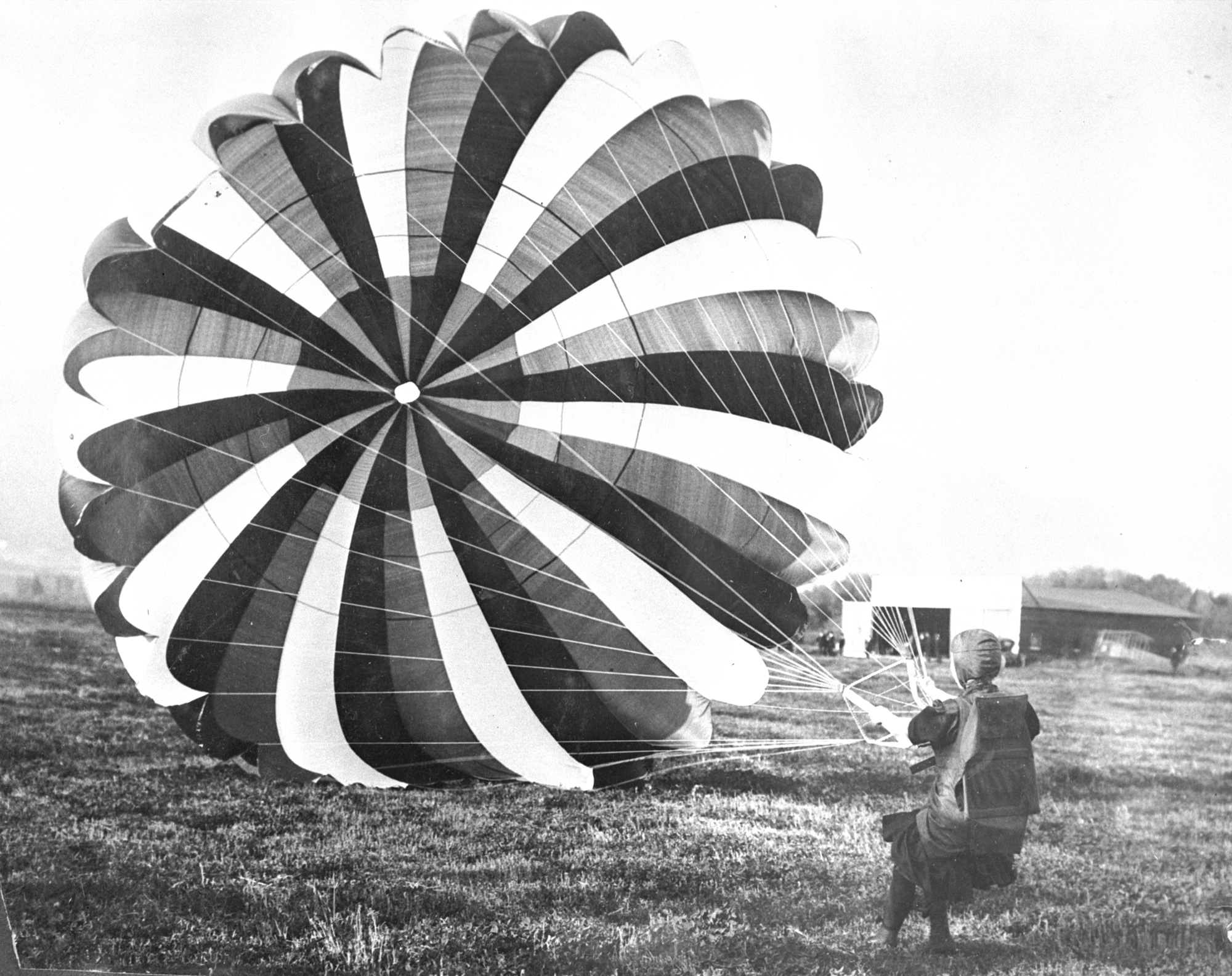
"Tiny" with chute

Among her many other achievements, she was the first woman to parachute from an airplane, which she is sometimes credited with accomplishing over Los Angeles on June 21, 1913, with aviator Glenn L. Martin as the pilot. However, she previously made at least two jumps from Martin's plane during an exhibition in Chicago's Grant Park the week of September 16, 1912. These early jumps included a well-publicized jump on January 9, 1914, from a plane built and piloted by Martin, 1,000 feet (300 m) over Griffith Park in Los Angeles.

In 1914, she demonstrated parachutes to the US Army, which at the time had a small, hazardous fleet of aircraft. The Army, reluctant at first to adopt the parachute, watched as Tiny Broadwick dropped from the sky. On her fourth demonstration jump, the static line became entangled in the tail assembly of the aircraft; Broadwick was able to retrieve a knife from her suit and cut the line. Still holding the line, she was able to pull it and open the parachute after falling free from the empennage. Using this knowledge, on her next jump she cut the static line short and did not attach it to the plane. Instead, she deployed her chute manually by pulling the shortened, unattached line while in freefall in what may have been the first planned freefall jump from an airplane. This demonstrated that pilots could safely escape aircraft by using what was later called a ripcord. Also in 1914, Broadwick jumped into Lake Michigan, becoming the first woman to parachute into a body of water.

In 1912, Tiny Broadwick married Andrew Olsen, divorced, then, in 1916, married Harry Brown, and stopped parachuting for four years. That marriage also ended in divorce; she retained the name Georgia Brown thereafter. She also severed relations with Charles Broadwick, thereafter using Broadwick as her stage name. She returned to jumping in 1920 for two more years, retiring from jumping in 1922 due to problems with her ankles. By her count, she made over 1,100 jumps. Although she was not a pilot, she was one of the few female members of the Early Birds of Aviation.

== Later years ==
Broadwick appeared on television game shows You Bet Your Life episode 55–07 on November 10, 1955, and on To Tell the Truth on March 30, 1964. She was featured on the TV series Mysteries at the Museum season 11, episode 33. In 1963, she was interviewed by reporter Ben Runkle of WRAL and showcased her parachute which she planned to donate to a museum. In 1964, Broadwick donated a parachute, made by Charles Broadwick of 110 yards of silk, to the Smithsonian Air Museum, the precursor to the Smithsonian Air and Space Museum.

Broadwick died in 1978 and was buried in Sunset Gardens in Henderson, North Carolina.

== Legacy ==
In February 2006, Vance County, North Carolina, commissioners named a portion of the Henderson Outer Loop highway after her. Broadwick Street in Rancho Dominguez, California, is also named for her.

- Roberson, Elizabeth Whitley (31 May 2001). Tiny Broadwick: The First Lady of Parachuting. Pelican Publishing. ISBN 1-56554-780-2.
