= Skydiver day =

Unofficial Holiday

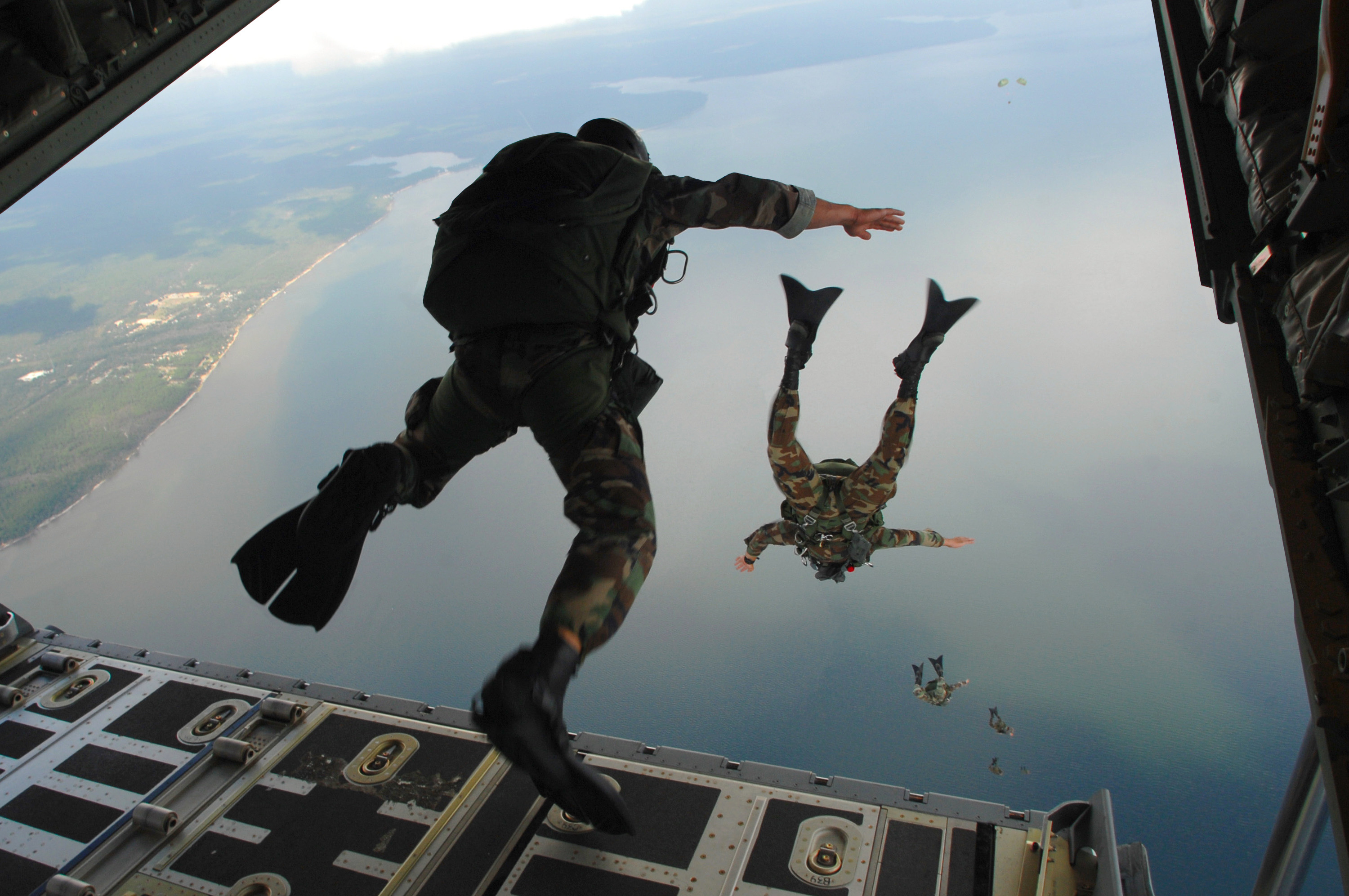
Airmen of the United States Air Force, assigned to the 720th Special Tactics Group, conduct a free-fall parachute jump

Skydiver day is an unofficial holiday of skydivers, annually celebrated on 26 July in some countries, such as Ukraine, Kazakhstan, Belarus, and Russia. In Brazil, skydiver day is celebrated on 22 October.

== History ==
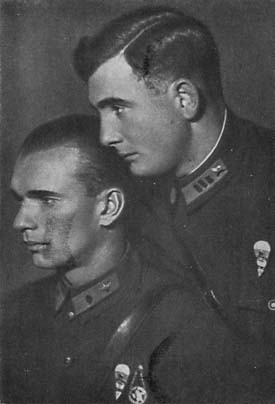
First soviet skydivers Leonid Minov and Yakov Moshkovsky

In 1929, RA kombrig Leonid Minov within the trading organization Amtorg Trading Corporation had visited the IRVIN-GQ factory, which produced the emergency parachutes, and performed several jumps. After returning to the USSR he was appointed to the Skydiving instructor position of the air forces of RA. He had performed a theoretical preparation for 30 volunteers of the 11th aviation crew of Moscow military district. On 26 July, near Voronizh five USSR pilots and mechanics (Moshkovsky, Yegorov, Zakharov, Kovalenkov, Kukharenko, Mukhin, Povalyaev, Poydus, Fillipov, Freidman, Cherkashyn), headed by Leonid Minov, had performed the first training series of jumps from the plane in the history of the USSR. The parachutes used for jumps were produced by American company IRVIN-GQ, and were bought by Leonid Minov during his visit to the United States. In total, there were 59 jumps performed during the trainings from the period from 26 to 29 July. The first experience in 1930 propelled the further development of skydiving in the USSR. There were around 600 jumps performed from 1930 till the end of 1931. The enthusiasm was so high that many skydiving towers were built in city parks so anyone could perform jumps there.

== See also ==
- Airborne forces
- Skydiving
- Parachute
- United states air force
