= Project Excelsior =

United States Air Force parachuting project

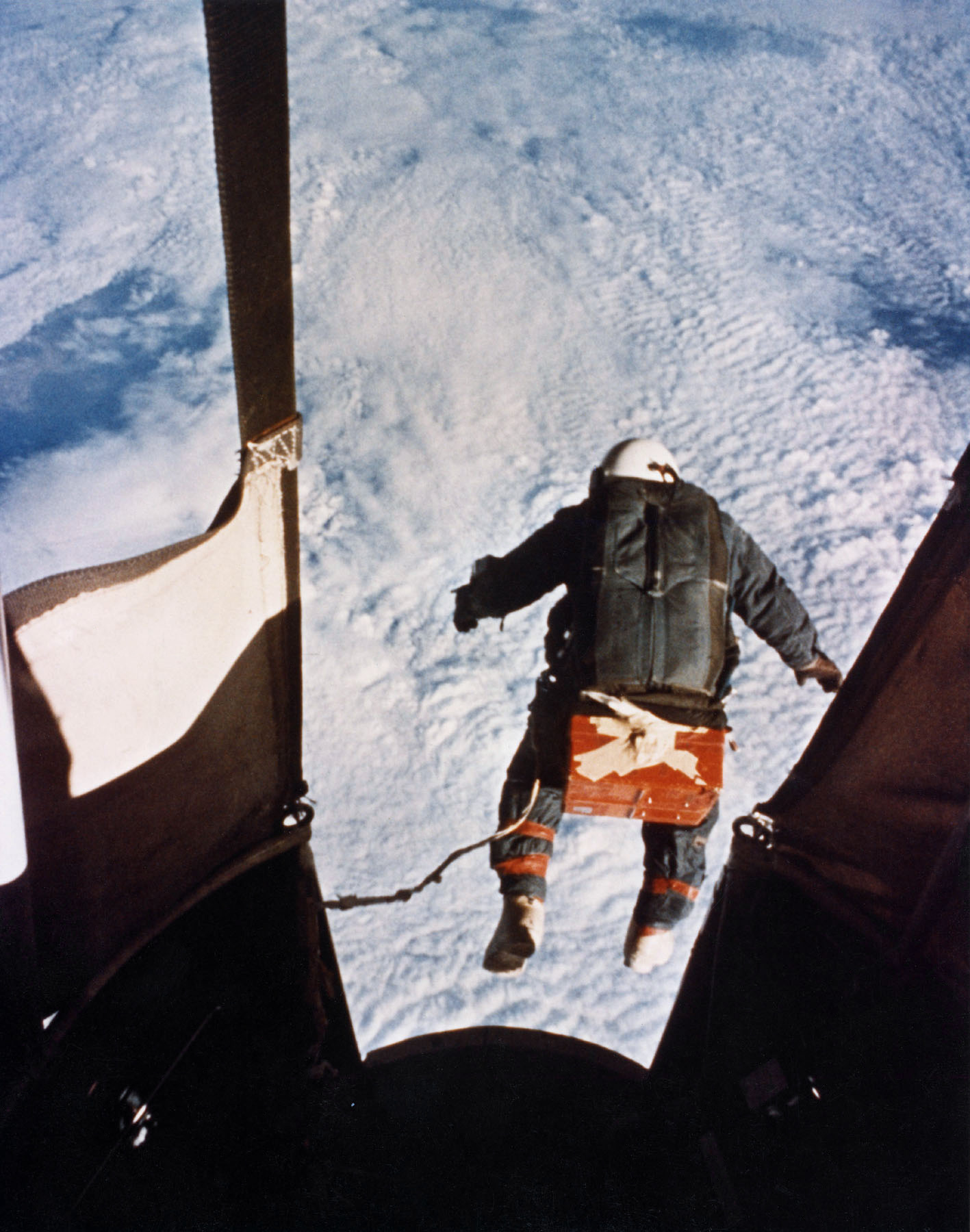
- Final jump seen from Excelsior III
- Duration: 1959–1960 (three jumps)
- Places: Stratosphere over the New Mexico desert
- Purpose: Test of parachute for high altitude falls
- Vehicle: Helium balloon with open gondola (the aeronaut was wearing a pressure suit)
- Aeronaut: Joe Kittinger (Captain, USAF)
- Records: (Last jump, 16 August 1960): Altitude: 19.47 mi (31.33 km); Speed: 614 mph (988 km/h); Duration: 13 m 45 s

Project Excelsior was a series of parachute jumps made by Joseph Kittinger of the United States Air Force in 1959 and 1960 from helium balloons in the stratosphere. The purpose was to test the Beaupre multi-stage parachute system intended to be used by pilots ejecting from high altitude. In one of these jumps Kittinger set world records for the longest parachute drogue fall, the highest parachute jump, and the fastest speed by a human through the atmosphere. He held the latter two of these records for 52 years, until they were broken by Felix Baumgartner of the Red Bull Stratos project in 2012, though he still holds the world record for longest time in free fall.

== Background ==
As jet planes flew higher and faster in the 1950s, the Air Force became increasingly worried about the safety of flight crews who had to eject at high altitude. Tests in Operation High Dive with dummies had shown that a body in free-fall at high altitude would often go into a flat spin at a rate of up to 200 revolutions per minute (about 3.3 revolutions per second). This would be potentially fatal.

Project Excelsior was initiated in 1958 to design a parachute system that would allow a safe, controlled descent after a high-altitude ejection. Francis Beaupre, a technician at Wright-Patterson AFB, Ohio, devised a multi-stage parachute system to facilitate human tests. This consisted of a small 6 ft (2 m) diameter stabilizer or "drogue" parachute, designed to prevent uncontrolled spinning at high altitudes, and a 28 ft (8.5 m) diameter main parachute that deployed at a lower altitude. The system included timers and altitude sensors that would automatically deploy both parachutes at the correct points in the descent, even if the parachutist were unconscious or disabled.

To test the parachute system, staff at Wright Field built a 200 ft (61 m) high helium balloon with a capacity of nearly 3,000,000 cubic feet (85,000 m^{3}) that could lift an open gondola and test pilot into the stratosphere. Captain Joseph Kittinger, who was test director for the project, made three ascents and test jumps. As the gondola was unpressurized, Kittinger wore a modified David Clark MC-3A partial pressure suit during these tests, plus additional layers of clothing to protect him from the extreme cold at high altitude. Together with the parachute system, this almost doubled his weight.

== Test jumps ==
The first test, Excelsior I, was made on November 16, 1959. Kittinger ascended in the gondola and jumped from an altitude of 76,400 feet (23,287 m). In this first test, the stabilizer parachute was deployed too soon, catching Kittinger around the neck and causing him to spin at 120 revolutions per minute. This caused Kittinger to lose consciousness, but his life was saved by his main parachute which opened automatically at a height of 10,000 feet (3,048 m).

Despite this near-disaster on the first test, Kittinger went ahead with another test only three weeks later. The second test, Excelsior II, was made on December 11, 1959. This time, Kittinger jumped from an altitude of 74,700 feet (22,769 m) and descended in free-fall for 55,000 feet (16,764 m) before opening his main parachute.

The third and final test, Excelsior III, was made on August 16, 1960. During the ascent, the pressure seal in Kittinger's right glove failed, and he began to experience severe pain in his right hand from the exposure of his hand to the extreme low pressure. (See Space exposure.) He decided not to inform the ground crew about this, in case they should decide to abort the test. Despite temporarily losing the use of his right hand, he continued with the ascent, climbing to an altitude of 102,800 feet (31,333 m). The ascent took one hour and 31 minutes and broke the previous crewed balloon altitude record of 101,516 feet (30,942 m), which was set by Major David Simons as part of Project Manhigh in 1957. Kittinger stayed at peak altitude for 12 minutes, waiting for the balloon to drift over the landing target area. He then stepped out of the gondola to begin his descent.

The small stabilizer parachute deployed successfully and Kittinger fell for 4 minutes and 36 seconds, setting a long-standing world record for the longest free-fall. During the descent, Kittinger experienced temperatures as low as −94 °F (−70 °C). In the free-fall stage, he reached a top speed of 614 miles per hour (988 km/h). For context, a free-falling average human body moves at a velocity of 240–290 km/h. At an altitude of 17,500 feet (5,334 m), Kittinger opened his main parachute and landed safely in the New Mexico desert. The whole descent took 13 minutes and 45 seconds and set a world record for the highest parachute jump.

An hour and thirty-one minutes after launch, my pressure altimeter halts at 103,300 feet. At ground control the radar altimeters also have stopped-on readings of 102,800 feet, the figure that we later agree upon as the more reliable. It is 7 o'clock in the morning, and I have reached float altitude ... Though my stabilization chute opens at 96,000 feet, I accelerate for 6,000 feet more before hitting a peak of 614 miles an hour, nine-tenths the speed of sound at my altitude.

A plaque attached below the open door of the Excelsior III gondola read, "This is the highest step in the world".

Kittinger held the world records for highest parachute jump and highest speed of a human in atmosphere until October 14, 2012 when Felix Baumgartner jumped from 127,852 feet (38,969 m) and reaching a speed of 377.12 m/s as part of the Red Bull Stratos project, with Kittinger serving as a technical advisor to Baumgartner. Kittinger does, however, still hold the records for longest drogue fall and longest freefall.

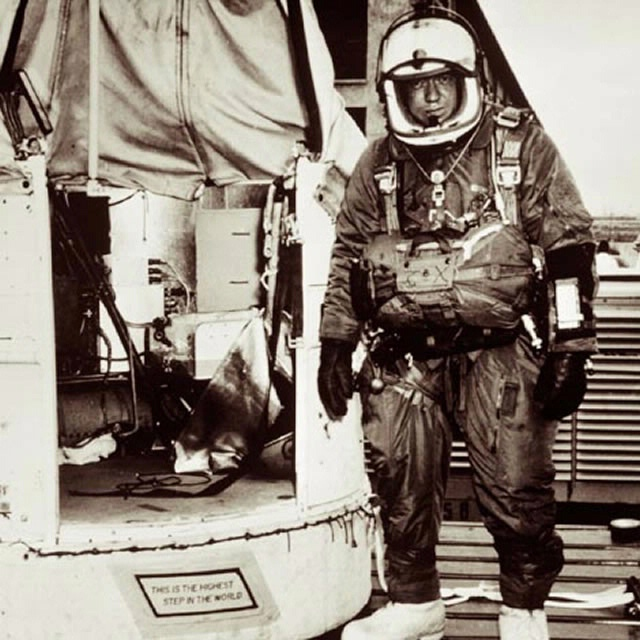
Joseph Kittinger next to the Excelsior gondola. The plaque reads "This Is The Highest Step In The World".

Film of the historic jump

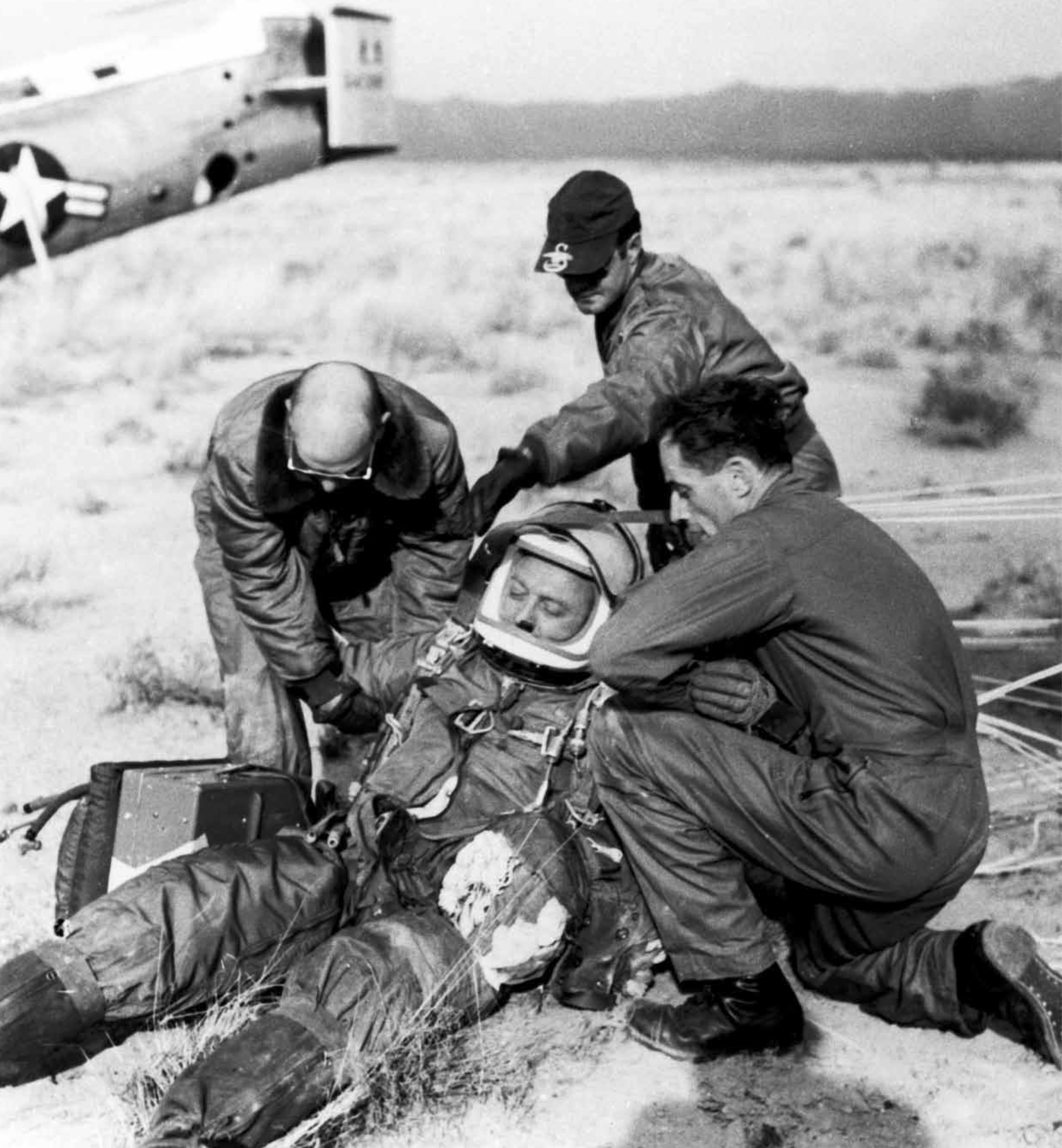
A ground crew assists Joe Kittinger in removing his flight gear after the successful flight of Excelsior III. Despite the appearances, Kittinger was fine.

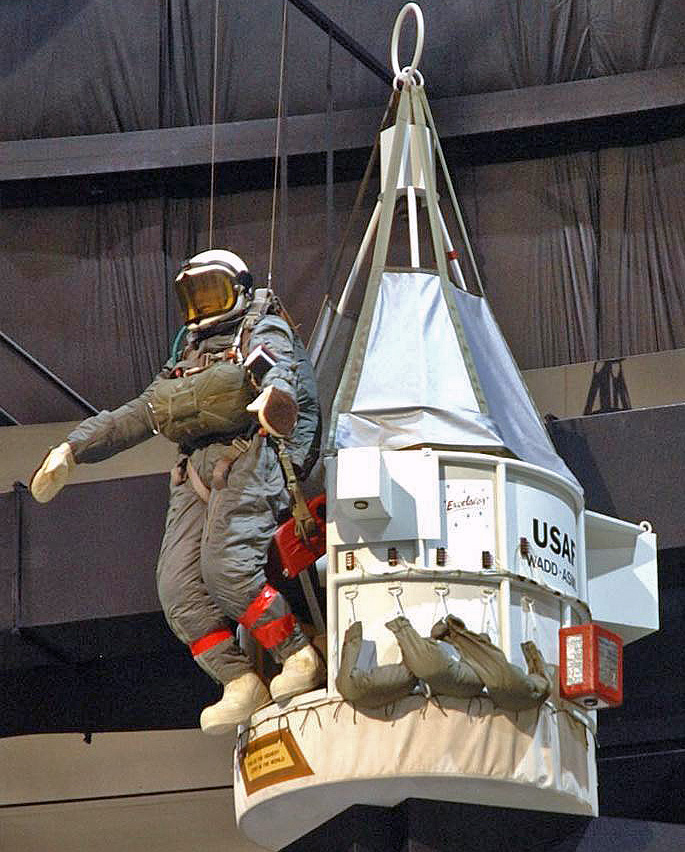
Replica of the Excelsior III gondola at the National Museum of the United States Air Force

== Response ==
Comparison of approximate altitudes of various objects and successful stratospheric jumps, and a graph of International Standard Atmosphere temperature and pressure

Kittinger's efforts during Project Excelsior proved that it was possible for an air crew to descend safely after ejecting at high altitudes. President Dwight D. Eisenhower awarded Kittinger the C. B. Harmon Trophy for his work on Excelsior. Kittinger also received an oak leaf cluster to the Distinguished Flying Cross, the J.J. Jeffries Award, the A. Leo Stevens Parachute Medal, and the Wingfoot Lighter-Than-Air Society Achievement Award.

== See also ==
- Alan Eustace who in 2014 jumped from 135,889 feet (41,419 m) and had a 123,334 foot (37,592 m) freefall with a drogue chute which exceeds both of Joseph Kittinger's records.
- Le Grand Saut
- Auguste Piccard, Swiss physicist who in 1931 went to 51,775 ft (15,781 m) in a helium balloon in a spherical gondola.
- Red Bull Stratos, a 2012 mission advised by Kittinger, with Austrian skydiver Felix Baumgartner setting a new record
- Space diving
