= Operation High Dive =

Secret project carried out during the 1950s by the United States Air Force

Operation High Dive (also known as Project High Dive) was a secret project carried out during the 1950s by the United States Air Force. It tested high-altitude parachutes using anthropomorphic dummies. The dummies went into a 200 rpm flat spin, which would be fatal to a human. Further investigations on this led to Project Excelsior. It may later have been confused with Project Mogul and thus helped form the account of the Roswell incident.
