= Ram Air Progression System =

RAPS or Ram Air Progression System is a parachuting training system designed to take a student from beginner to the FAI A License (or Category 8) using square ram air canopies.

== System ==
The RAPS system was developed from the Static Line Rounds system. It enabled a student to make their first jumps on a ram-air parachute, which offers softer landings and more control. RAPS evolved into the category system, which allows students to use ram-air canopies from their first jump. In the early jumps the parachute is deployed automatically using a static line; after proving basic proficiency the student progresses onto freefall, opening their own parachute by means of a ripcord and spring-loaded pilot chute. The static line method is used in many countries, and although it varies it is, in general, based upon the following structure.

- Static line
  - Basic jumps – to prove the student's ability to safely exit the aircraft, then fly and land a canopy. The student must be able to go into the stable arched position out of the aircraft before being progressed to dummy ripcord pulls.
  - Dummy ripcord pulls (DPs) – the student demonstrates the ability to pull a dummy ripcord while still using the static line to actually deploy the canopy. Generally the student must perform three satisfactory DPs in sequence to be allowed to progress onto freefall. A successful DP is counted as one in which the student not only manages to pull the handle, but also manages to keep an arched position facing in the same direction as when they jumped.
- Freefall
  - Early freefall – to prove the student can successfully deploy a canopy in freefall (usually 3 to 5 seconds). In most systems the student must perform a 3-second freefall as their first jump, followed by a 5-second freefall. Assuming the student can remain stable enough for a successful deployment of the main parachute they will be progressed onto ten-second delays.
  - 10-second delays – the student will jump and wait for 10 seconds before deploying their main parachute. This jump will be the first time a student experiences the full transition from falling vertically to falling "belly-to-earth". Typically a student must perform two stable delays of 10 seconds before progressing.
  - 15/20-second delays – gradually increasing freefall time (10 to 20 seconds) so the student can demonstrate stability for longer periods. It is at this stage that the student will first reach terminal velocity. Usually on the second 15-second delay the student will be given a hand-mounted altimeter for the first time, and will pull either after 15 seconds or earlier if they fall to a determined height. The 20-second delay will almost always be performed with an altimeter, and the student will generally pull based on the reading of the altimeter rather than their own count at this stage.
  - Freefall skills – the student will be jumping from the full height that their dropzone allows, usually experiencing up to a minute of freefall. At this point each jump will involve the learning and practicing of a new maneuver, which are listed below.
    - Turns – the student learns to rotate on the spot whilst falling
    - Tracking – the student learns to move through the air horizontally
    - Dive exit – the student learns to dive from the plane into the stable position - after this jump they will no longer exit in the standard student position (sitting or standing on a step)
    - Unstable exit – the student will be made to exit the aircraft unstable and hold this position for a short time, after which they will demonstrate the ability to go stable before deploying their parachute
    - Backloop – the student learns to do what is basically a backflip whilst falling
    - Track turns – the student learns to turn as they track in a specific direction
  - Final qualifying jump – The student has to perform one final qualifying jump to demonstrate that they have learnt all the skills from previous jumps. This must begin with a dive exit, contain two 360-degree turns, a backloop and a demonstration of tracking. After this the student is progressed to Category 8, and can attain their A licence once they have completed the Canopy Handling 1 qualification.

== See also ==
- Accelerated freefall – An alternative training method.
