= A. Leo Stevens Parachute Medal =

The A. Leo Stevens Parachute Medal is named after the ballooning and parachute pioneer, Albert Leo Stevens. It was first awarded to Joe Crane of Mineola, New York, by Augustus Post, at the Early Birds of Aviation banquet, held in the Hotel Carter in Cleveland, Ohio, on September 4, 1948, during the National Air Race.

== Winners ==
- 1948 Joe Crane
- 1949 E. Verne Stewart
- 1950 Arthur J. Lapham
- 1951 William R. Lovelace
- 1952 Harold R. Harris
- 1953 Amos R. Little
- 1954 John Stapp
- 1954 Thomas E. Willson (Special)
- 1955 George F. Smith (parachuter)
- 1956 Helmut G. Heinrich
- 1957 Robert F. Oakley
- 1958 Jacques-André Istel
- 1959 Joseph Kittinger

== See also ==
- List of aviation awards
