= Caterpillar Club =

Informal aviation association

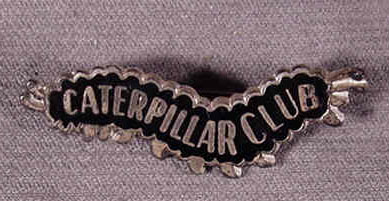
A pin from a parachute company, possibly Switlik or Standard Parachute. This style is common in catalogs and auctions of military memorabilia.

The Caterpillar Club is an informal association of people who have successfully used a parachute to bail out of a disabled aircraft. After authentication by the parachute maker, applicants receive a membership certificate and a distinctive lapel pin. The nationality of the person whose life was saved by parachute and ownership of the aircraft are not factors in determining qualification for membership; anybody whose life was saved by using a parachute after bailing out of a disabled aircraft is eligible. The requirement that the aircraft is disabled naturally excludes parachuting enthusiasts in the normal course of a recreational jump, or those involved in military training jumps.

The Airborne Systems company of New Jersey continues the tradition of certifying members and awarding pins to this day.

== History ==
The club was founded by Leslie Irvin of the Irvin Airchute Company of Canada in 1922. (Though Leslie Irvin is credited with inventing the first free-fall parachute in 1919, parachutes stored in canisters had saved the lives of observers in balloons and several German and Austro-Hungarian pilots of disabled military aircraft in the First World War.) The name "Caterpillar Club" refers to the silk threads that made the original parachutes, thus recognising the debt owed to the silkworm. Other people have taken the metaphor further by comparing the act of bailing out with that of the caterpillar letting itself down to earth by a silken thread. Another metaphor is that caterpillars have to climb out of their cocoons to escape and survive.

"Life depends on a silken thread" is the club's motto.

An early brochure of the Irvin Parachute Company credits William O'Connor 24 August 1920 at McCook Field near Dayton, Ohio as the first person to be saved by an Irvin parachute, but this feat was unrecognised. On 20 October 1922, Lieutenant Harold R. Harris, chief of the McCook Field Flying Station, jumped from a disabled Loening PW-2A monoplane fighter. Shortly after, two reporters from the Dayton Herald, realizing that there would be more jumps in future, suggested that a club should be formed. Harris became the first member and from that time forward any person who jumped from a disabled aircraft with a parachute became a member of the Caterpillar Club. Other famous members include four-time inductee Charles Lindbergh, three-timer General James Doolittle,aviation pioneer Augustus Post, Larry "Scrappy" Blumer and (retired) astronaut John Glenn. The first woman to become a member was Irene McFarland in 1925.

In 1922 Leslie Irvin agreed to give a gold pin to every person whose life was saved by one of his parachutes. At the end of the Second World War the number of members with the Irvin pins had grown to over 34,000 though the total of people saved by Irvin parachutes is estimated to be 100,000.

The successor to the original Irvin company still provides pins to people who have made a jump. In addition to the Irvin Air Chute Company, other parachute manufacturers have also issued caterpillar pins for successful jumps. GC Parachutes formed their Gold Club in 1940. The Switlik Parachute Company of Trenton, New Jersey issued both gold and silver caterpillar pins. The Pioneer Parachute Co. in Skokie, Illinois, also presented plaques to people who packed the parachutes that saved lives.

== Membership requirements ==
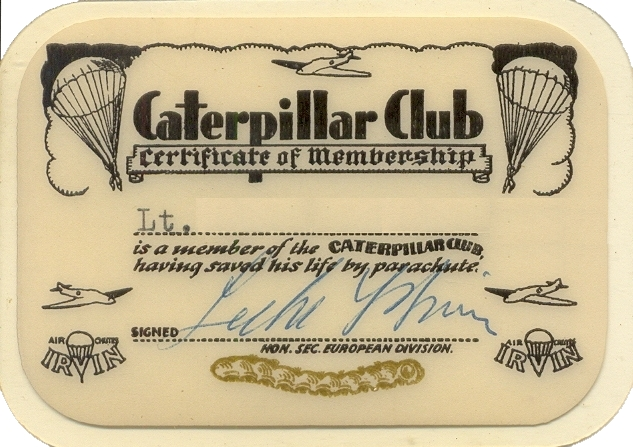
Membership certificate issued 1957

There are no annual fees, though the Switlik club charges a nominal enrollment fee. Both the Irvin and Switlik clubs issue gold and silver pins depicting caterpillars. The Irvin Golden Caterpillar has amethyst eyes. Prospective members must send documentation of the incident to the manufacturer, which then conducts its own research.

The requirements for membership are rigid – members must have saved their lives by jumping with a parachute. Consequently, RAF Flight sergeant Nicholas Alkemade, who during the Second World War baled out of an Avro Lancaster without a parachute and survived, was refused membership because a parachute had not been used. More recently, a group of twelve skydivers were denied membership when one of them fouled the plane's tail and caused it to fall from the sky. He died in the crash but the other eleven parachuted to safety. They did not qualify because it had been their original intention to jump from the plane. The pilot, however, was admitted to the club.

== Active branch ==
The Caterpillar Club (North West) Association, an active branch of the Caterpillar Club has its annual reunion/dinner/dance in Blackpool in the Northwest of England each March. The club has approximately 70 members, either ex-Second World War RAF aircrew, family members of deceased members or associate members. Despite its 'North West' title, the club welcomes former Caterpillars from across the UK and worldwide. It is believed to be the last remaining active Caterpillar Club.

== See also ==
- Goldfish Club
- Henri L'Estrange, parachute survivor of a hot air balloon crash 50 years before the club was founded
- Ejection Tie Club
