= IRVIN-GQ =

British aerospace manufacturing company

IrvinGQ
- Company type: Private Limited Company
- Industry: Aerospace Manufacturing
- Founded: 1919
- Headquarters: Llangeinor, Wales
- Products: Emergency and survival equipment
- Parent: TransDigm Group
- Website: irvingq.com

IrvinGQ, formerly known as Airborne Systems, is an aerospace manufacturing company based in Llangeinor, Wales, United Kingdom. It specialises in the design, manufacture and supply of a range of parachutes and emergency, rescue and survival equipment for both the military and civilian markets.

The company can trace its routes back to the Irvin Airchute Company, founded in 1919, and GQ Parachutes, founded in 1932. Both firms had become key manufacturers of emergency escape parachutes by the end of the 1930s, selling their products to many air forces throughout the globe. The rival firms cooperated during the Second World War, developing safer and increasingly reliable parachute assemblies for aircrews and airborne forces; their parachutes were extensively used throughout the conflict. In the postwar period, both companies continued to advance their products into new fields, including their incorporation into ejector seats, the recovery of space vehicles, brake parachute, and the aerial delivery of very large payloads.

The Irvin Airchute Company was ultimately acquired by its long-time collaborator GQ Parachutes. During 2001, the merged entity was named IRVIN-GQ. Having changed ownership multiple times over the years, the company is presently a subsidiary of aerospace conglomerate TransDigm Group. Since 2003, IrvinGQ has based its main UK manufacturing site in Llangeinor, Wales.

== History ==
IrvinGQ has its origins in the Irvin Airchute Company, which was established during 1919 in Buffalo, New York by the parachutist Leslie Irvin, who had performed the world's first free-fall parachute jump earlier that same year. During 1925, the Royal Air Force (RAF) placed an order with the Irvin Airchute Company to supply parachutes for its aircrews. To fulfil this and future European orders, the firm established a factory in the United Kingdom in 1926.

During 1932, James Gregory and Raymond Quilter founded another pioneering parachute manufacturer, GQ Parachutes. By the end of the 1930s, both companies had become well established major suppliers of emergency escape parachutes to many air forces around the world. During 1940, GQ and Irvin collaborated on the X-Type parachute assembly, which provided a safe and reliable static line assembly for paratroopers. This model was mass-produced throughout the rest of the Second World War, being used by both aircrews and airborne forces alike, and for several decades after the war's end. One high-profile example of its use was during the D-Day Landings, the delivery of the advance airborne units over Normandy made extensive use of the X-Type parachute assembly.

Both companies were able to maintain relevance following the end of the conflict; their products were adapted to suit the high-speed military aircraft that arrived during the 1950s and 1960s. Their parachutes were subsequently adopted by British aviation firm Martin-Baker for their range of ejector seats, including the very first use of such a seat. Over the decades, the company has become a world leader in the field of emergency escape parachutes. Both the capability and range of uses for parachutes expanded during the Cold War period, particularly into non-personnel applications, such as the safe recovery of space vehicles and unmanned aircraft. The aerial delivery of very large and varied loads of equipment, enabled by effective arrangements of parachutes, was another frontier. The company has also produced compact air-deployed survival kits; these have been integrated into various aircraft to support their crews in the event of ejection.

Another market for their products was as brake parachutes; Irvin has supplied these for numerous RAF aircraft, including the BAE Systems Hawk, SEPECAT Jaguar and Eurofighter Typhoon. The United States Air Force (USAF) also adopted the company's braking parachutes for their aircraft, including the Lockheed SR-71 Blackbird; NASA also used them on its Space Shuttle. Ballistic parachutes, for the purpose of recovering out-of-control aircraft, became another application from the 1960s onwards. Since 1991, the company has operated a specialised outsourced service facility, the Airborne Forces Parachute Support Unit (AFPSU), which repairs, maintains and packs all of the parachutes and related equipment for The Parachute Regiment of the British Army.

The Irvin Airchute Company was ultimately acquired by its long-time collaborator GQ Parachutes. During 1994, the company acquired and integrated with Aircraft Materials Ltd, a specialist producer of survival equipment and aerial delivery platforms. During 2001, the merged entity was named IRVIN-GQ. In 2007, it was rebranded as Airborne Systems; however, during 2018, the company readopted its previous name of IrvinGQ.

During 2000, IRVIN-GQ was sold to Alchemy Partners, a private equity firm. In December 2002, the company revealed a £5 million investment programme which included the creation of around 200 jobs, in addition to the relocation of its main UK production site from Blackmill in Bridgend to neighbouring Llangeinor. Outside of the UK, IRVIN-GQ operates factories in both the United States and Canada. By late 2010, the Llangeinor facility reportedly employed around 250 people.

During September 2006, representatives from the company formed part of a trade mission to China led by the then First Minister for Wales Rhodri Morgan. In January 2010, the company secured a £50 million contract to supply equipment to the French Ministry of Defence. In response to this deal, on 1 September 2013, IrvinGQ (France), was established to provide technical and logistical repair, and support services for customers throughout continental Europe from the firm's new facility in Toulouse, France. By 2015, the firm was reportedly deriving over 50 per cent of its turnover from its export customers.

During 2010, IRVIN-GQ was sold to American private equity company Metalmark Capital. During 2013, it again changed ownership, this time to aerospace conglomerate TransDigm Group. By 2020, the company's core products included naval decoy systems, parachutes, aerial delivery and survival equipment, and associated services.

== Associated companies ==
Co-located at Llangeinor with IrvinGQ are:

- Aircraft Materials Limited, a company for design, development and manufacture of a wide range of systems for the aerial delivery of cargo, aerial material handling, personnel and cargo restraint and safety harnesses.
- Advanced Inflatable Products, a manufacturer of balloons, inflatable and fabric engineered products for the defence and aerospace markets.

== See also ==
- Paratrooper
