= Charles Broadwick =

American parachute inventor and pioneer (1870s–1943)

Charles Henry Broadwick
- Born: John Murray; 22 February 1875; Grand Rapids, Kent County, Michigan
- Died: 9 March 1943 (aged 68); San Mateo County, California
- Occupations: Inventor, aeronaut
- Known for: parachute innovations, instructing female parachutist Tiny Broadwick
- Spouses: Jeanette "Jennie" Ringold [1899-1904], Maude Broadwick [1904-1905] Georgia Anne "Tiny Broadwick" Thompson, Ethel Lillian Knutsen [1919-1920]

Charles Broadwick (born John Murray, 1870s–1943) was an American pioneering parachutist and inventor. An executive director of the U.S. Parachute Association, Ed Scott, said "just about all modern parachute systems" use ideas Broadwick developed: "an integrated, form-fitting harness and container system nestled on the back." Broadwick developed the static line, a line from a parachute to an aircraft that pulls the parachute from its pouch. Static lines are still used by paratroopers and novice skydivers. U.S. Army Warrant Officer Jeremiah Jones commented, "[Broadwick] is like the grandfather of paratroopers." Broadwick demonstrated parachute jumps at fairs and taught and equipped famous female parachutist Tiny Broadwick.

== Early life ==
Born in the 1870s as John Murray, Charles Broadwick grew up in Grand Rapids, Michigan in a poor family. He developed aeronautical interests early in life. At age 13, he had his first ride in a hot air balloon. When the balloon caught fire, Broadwick climbed up the balloon and extinguished the fire.

== Personal life ==
John Murray married Jennie Ringold in 1897 and their daughter, Marie Sadie Murray, was born in 1899. As Charles Henry Broadwick he was married to Maude Broadwick, Georgia Anne "Tiny Broadwick" Thompson, and actress Ethel Lillian Knutsen. Both Maude and Ethel died in parachuting accidents.

== Balloon drops ==
By the age of 16 Broadwick (using his new name) was performing at fairs and exhibitions, parachuting from underneath a hot air balloon. Upon ascent, the parachute was suspended beneath the balloon. A trapeze hung beneath the parachute, and Broadwick held onto the trapeze. After the balloon ascended to a sufficient height, Broadwick would release the parachute. He fell for a distance, thrilling the crowd, until his parachute filled and he floated to earth.

On November 2, 1905, during a performance in Anderson, South Carolina, Broadwick's performing partner, Maude Broadwick, fell to her death. She was either caught in ropes as the balloon rose and then fell or she committed suicide in front of a crowd of 1,000 people.

Hanging below a parachute during the balloon's ascent was hazardous. For example, winds or turbulence could cause the aeronaut to be swung into nearby trees or buildings. To reduce the risks, by 1906 Broadwick had developed a new type of parachute. The parachute was folded into a pack which was strapped to his back. The parachute was opened by a static line attached to the balloon. During ascent Broadwick was directly below the balloon and less susceptible to being swung into obstacles. When Broadwick jumped from the balloon, the static line drew taut, pulled the parachute from the pack, and then snapped. Similar methods for carrying and deploying parachutes later became standard.

In 1908, after seeing Broadwick jump from a balloon at a fair in Raleigh, North Carolina, a 15-year-old single mother named Georgia "Tiny" Jacobs convinced him to allow her to join the performance. She later adopted the name Tiny Broadwick and was variously described as Charles Broadwick's daughter or wife. Tiny Broadwick became famous for her many parachute jumps.

== Promotion of parachuting ==
Advances in, and greater use of airplanes created new opportunities for parachutes, including saving people in disabled aircraft. Charles and Tiny Broadwick moved to Southern California in 1911 to be near a nexus of aviation development.

Charles Broadwick's "coatpack" parachute caught the attention of businessman and aviation pioneer Glenn Martin. In 1912 Tiny Broadwick became the first woman to jump from an airplane, piloted by Martin. Charles Broadwick allowed Martin to claim credit for developing the coatpack. Martin even filed a patent. Broadwick later clearly stated the packed parachute was his invention and described Martin taking credit as "simply an advertising matter." Tiny Broadwick also confirmed that Charles Broadwick was the inventor.

With the start of World War I, Broadwick saw great potential for his coatpack parachute, or "life preserver of the air." In 1914 and 1915, the Broadwicks demonstrated the coatpack to Congressmen, the United States Army, and pilots. The Army purchased two packs for testing, but did not evaluate them during the war. Until very late in the war, the Allied military was reluctant to provide pilots with parachutes. While this was due to many reasons, one factor was that the parachute technology of the time was immature. For instance, using a static line connected to the plane to deploy the parachute, as was done with Charles Broadwick's coatpack, was not effective under some circumstances. Broadwick continued to work on new approaches for saving people. For example, in 1916 Broadwick experimented with people exiting planes through a trap seat.

Shortly after the war, there was an effort to combine the best aspects of the parachute designs. The resulting parachute, the Airplane Parachute Type-A, incorporated Charles Broadwick's coatpack, a ripcord that allowed a pilot to manually deploy the parachute instead of depending on a static line connected to a plane, and a small pilot chute that pulled the parachute from its pack. The Airplane Parachute Type-A was widely used and saved a number of people, including a young Charles Lindbergh.

In 1920, Charles Broadwick suffered a tragedy when his wife Ethel Knutsen, a young aspiring actor, was testing one of Broadwick's new parachutes. The suspension lines of the parachute tangled and Knutsen fell 2,000 feet. She succumbed to her injuries hours later.

In the late 1920s Broadwick developed, patented, and tested a parachute system for airplanes, "planechutes." The intent was that a disabled plane or a plane lost in the fog could safely descend. However, the system was never fully successful. For instance, in a 1929 test one of the plane's two parachutes became wrapped around the plane instead of deploying. The plane dropped rapidly while the pilot was trapped by the parachute. The pilot finally escaped, jumped, and deployed his personal parachute. He safely reached the ground after narrowly avoiding being struck by the plane that was falling after him.

As the U.S. Army prepared itself for World War II, staff realized that to effectively drop paratroopers from a low altitude required a parachute that was opened by a static line, which would automatically open the parachute upon exiting the plane. At the time, though, the Army did not have a parachute that opened that way. All of its standard parachutes used a ripcord that a parachutist had to pull. To quickly address the need, the Army turned to the World War I-era Broadwick parachutes it had acquired. The Army added a reserve chute and some other modifications to produce its first standard parachute for paratroopers. Static line parachutes are still used by paratroops.

By 1940, Broadwick had retired. He died in 1943.

In 1964, Tiny Broadwick donated a Broadwick coatpack to the Smithsonian Institution.
