= Gleb Kotelnikov =

Russian inventor (1872–1944)

- Глеб Котельников
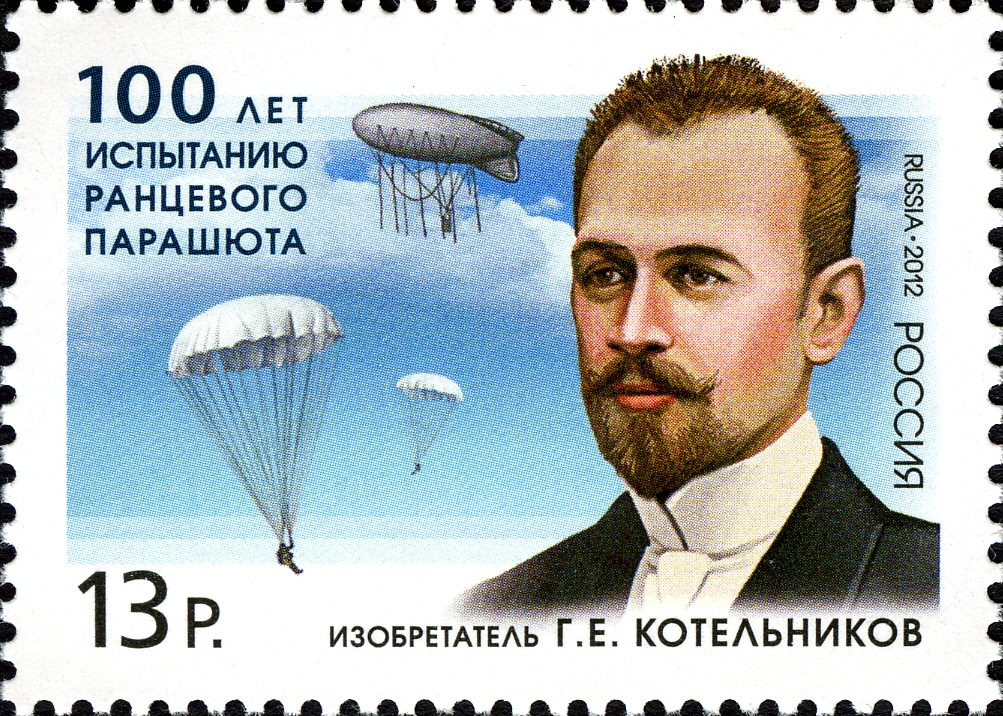
- Born: 18 January 1872; Saint Petersburg, Russia
- Died: 22 November 1944 (aged 72); Moscow Oblast, Soviet Union
- Cause of death: Starvation
- Military career
- Allegiance: Soviet Union
- Rank: Air Force of the Soviet Union, Major-General

Gleb Yevgenyevich Kotelnikov (Russian: Глеб Евгеньевич Котельников; 30 January [O.S. 18 January] 1872 – 22 November 1944) was a Russian and Soviet inventor of the knapsack parachute (first in the hard casing and then in the soft pack), and braking parachute.

== Early life, family and education ==
Gleb Kotelnikov had exceptional musical ability at a young age, becoming proficient on the violin, balalaika, and mandolin and even writing his own music. In addition to music, he was interested in electronics and fencing, and he had exceptional aptitude in building complex gadgets. Using only a used lens and hand-crafting the remaining components, such as photographic plates, he constructed a working camera at the age of thirteen. His father fostered his many interests and supported his ability.

After his father died unexpectedly, Kotelnikov had to change his plans to attend a technical institute or conservatory. Financial difficulties forced him to give up his artistic goals and enlist in the army, attending the Kiev Military School.

In 1894 he graduated with honors. After three years of compulsory service, he went into the reserve - returned to Poltava (where his parents resided since 1889), married there and got a job as an excise official in the provincial excise department. Excise service, simultaneously with the introduction of the wine monopoly, established a curatorial office for national sobriety, which organized public readings, open readings, and folk theaters - which allowed him to indulge in what he loved.

In 1910 Gleb returned to St Petersburg and became an actor in the troupe of the People's House on the Petersburg side (with Glebov-Kotelnikov as his pseudonym ).

Gleb Kotelnikov with his invention, the knapsack parachute.

== Career ==
Early in the 20th century, Russia's first pilots frequently conducted demonstration flights in large towns to demonstrate their proficiency with aircraft control. Kotelnikov developed a fascination with flying. He was a regular visitor to the Commandant airfield, where he watched the aircraft with interest. Kotelnikov was greatly moved by the courage and commitment of Russian pilots who ventured to the skies in shaky, primitive planes, and he realized the enormous possibilities of aerial exploration.

He witnessed the death of a talented Russian pilot Lev Matsievich which was such a shock that he became obsessed with the idea of constructing a parachute, to which he devoted several years of his life as well as all his personal savings.

In 1911 he created his first parachute RK-1 (which stands for Rantseviy (knapsack) or Russian Kotelnikova (by Kotelnikov), 1st model), that was successfully employed in 1914 during World War I.

Later on, Kotelnikov significantly improved the design of his parachute, creating new models, including RK-2 with a softer knapsack, RK-3, and a few cargo parachutes, all of which would be adopted by the Soviet Air Force.

In 1911 he applied for a patent to the Office National de la Propriété Industrielle in France and was granted the patent under the number 438612, in which he summarized the function of his parachute:

The working principle of the apparatus is as follows: in case of an emergency, a pilot, wearing it on his back, could throw himself out of an aircraft, opening a knapsack by pulling a cord attached to its lock. In case of an unexpected fall the device can work quite automatically. For that purpose the lock of the parapack is connected with a carriage of an aircraft by means of a cord which would open the lock of a parapack being stretched under the weight of a falling man.

At first G.Kotelnikov called his invention a safety apparatus, a knapsack-parachute and later on it got the name of RK-1.

In 1912 on a road near Tsarskoye Selo (now part of St. Petersburg) Kotelnikov successfully demonstrated the braking effects of the parachute by accelerating a Russo-Balt automobile to the top speed, and then opening a parachute attached to the back seat, thus inventing the drogue parachute. In aviation, however, drag chutes were used for the first time only in 1937 by the Soviet airplanes in the Arctic that were providing support for the famous polar expeditions of the era, such as the first drifting ice station North Pole-1, launched the same year. The drag chute allowed to land safely on the ice-floes of smaller size.

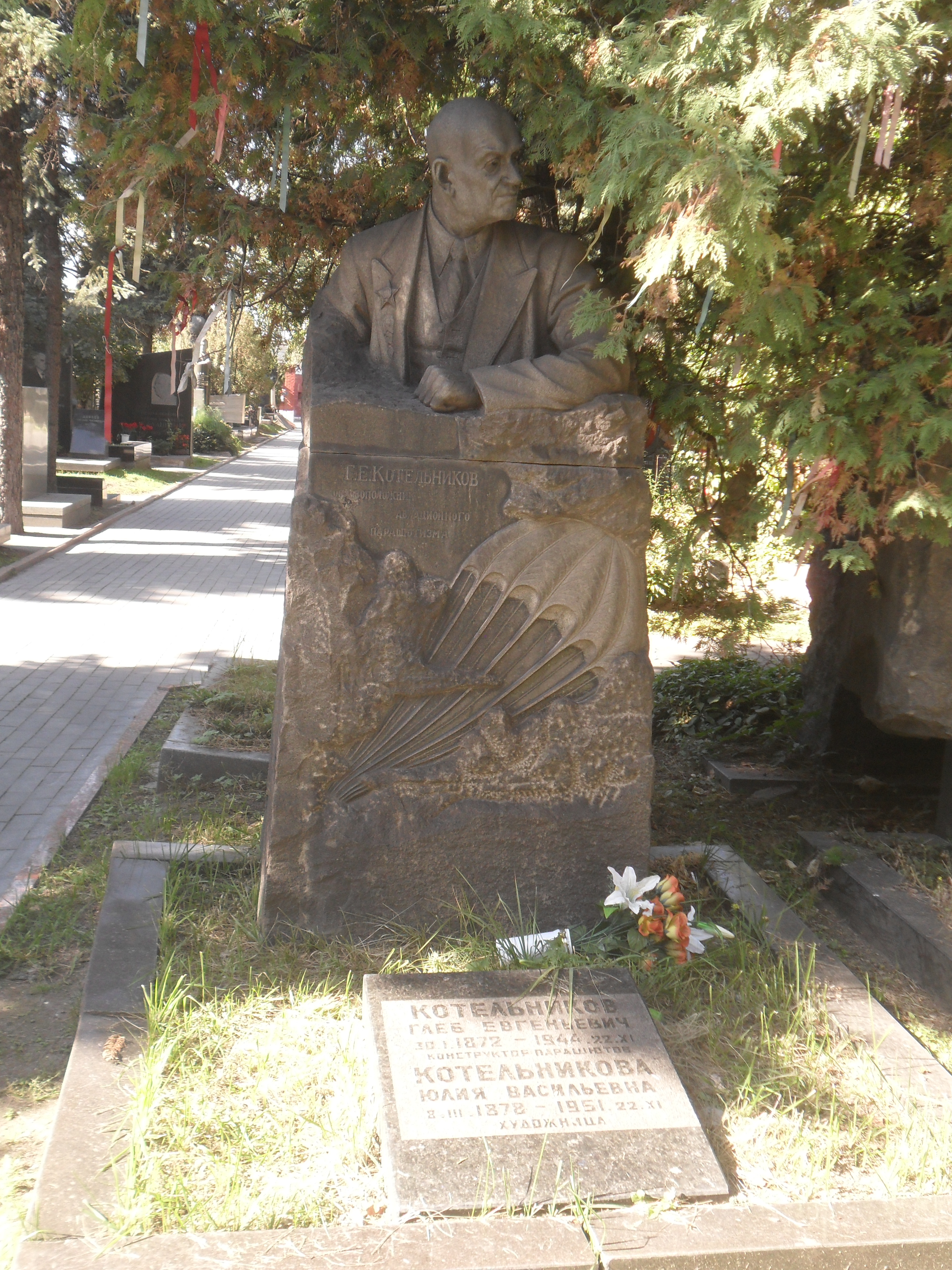
Tomb of Kotelnikov at the Novodevichy Cemetery in Moscow

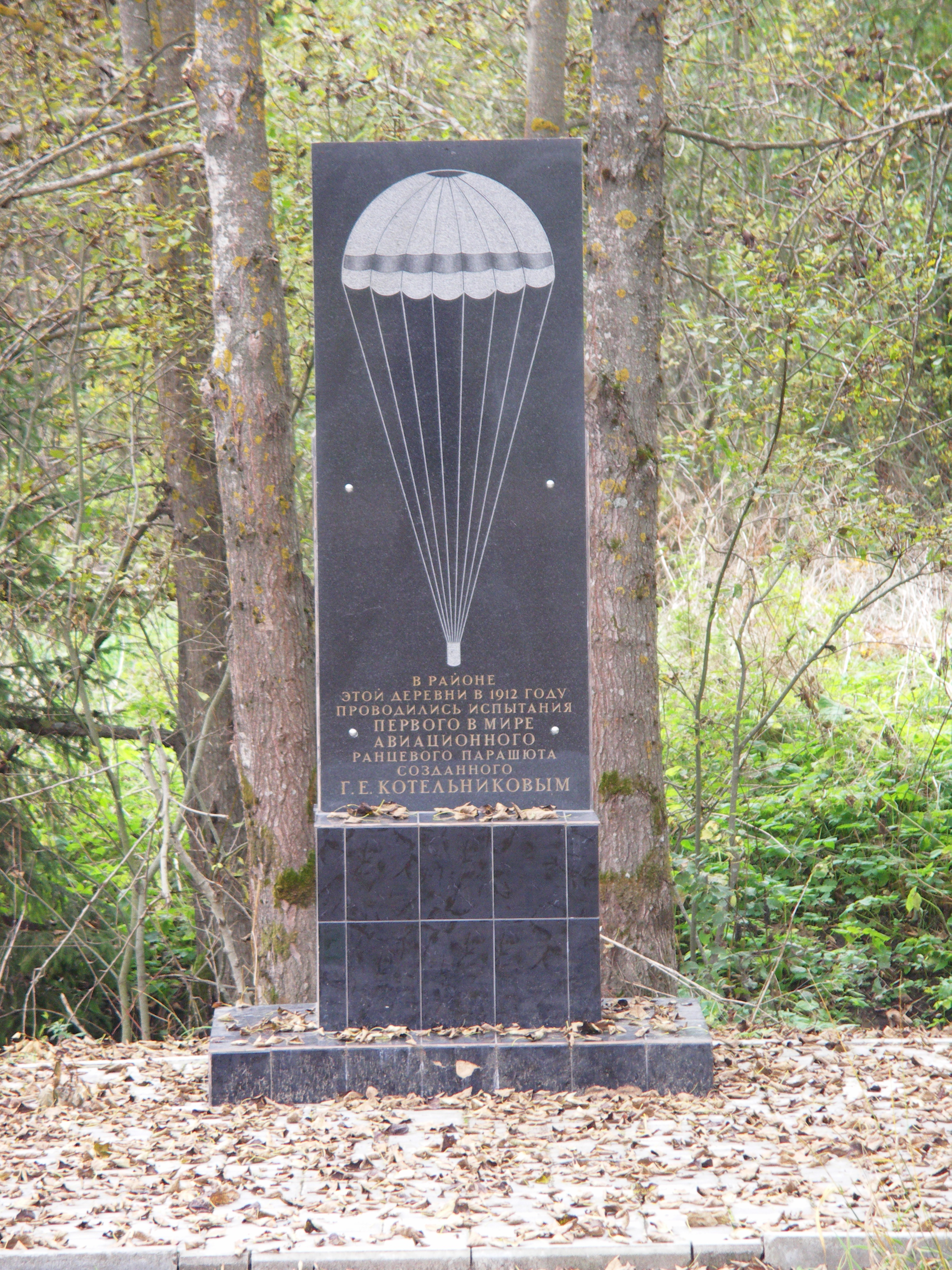
Monument to the RK-1 test in Kotelnikovo

Kotelnikov continued to be an important figure in the development of parachutes and parachuting in the Soviet Union. In 1924 Kotelnikov for the first time applied the soft packing of parachute instead of a hard casing. He produced some of the earliest cargo parachutes, and was a contemporary to the start of the parachuting sport in Russia in 1930 and the creation of the Soviet Airborne Troops the same year (the first paratrooping force in history). In his late years, Kotelnikov wrote a book about the invention and subsequent development of parachutes.

== Personal life, demise and legacy ==
According Oboznik Media, Kotelnikov headed the experimental design in the parachute section of the Leningrad Aeroclub while also giving lectures at places like military units and workers' clubs. He retired in 1926 at the age of fifty-four to concentrate on creating new models, and he kindly gave the Soviet government all of his aircraft rescue technologies. Kotelnikov received the Order of the Red Star in appreciation of his services. By 1938, he published a book titled "The History of an Invention".

In 1941, Kotelnikov was evacuated from the city of Leningrad, weakened by hunger, and nearly blind. The Russian innovator died on November 22, 1944, in the Russian capital. His grave at Novodevichy Cemetery in Moscow became a place of pilgrimage for Russian paratroopers.

The village Salizi, where he first tested his parachute, was renamed Kotelnikovo in his honor.
