= Ripcord (skydiving) =

Parachute release mechanism

A ripcord is a part of a skydiving harness-container system; a handle attached to a steel cable ending in a closing pin. The pin keeps the container closed and keeps the spring-loaded pilot chute inside. When the ripcord is pulled, the container is opened and the pilot chute is released, opening the parachute. On tandem systems the ripcord releases the 3-ring release system anchoring the bridle to the harness-container, allowing the parachute to open.

The ripcord was invented in 1914 by Tiny Broadwick.

== See also ==
- Pullstring
