= Static line =

Cord for automatically opening a parachute

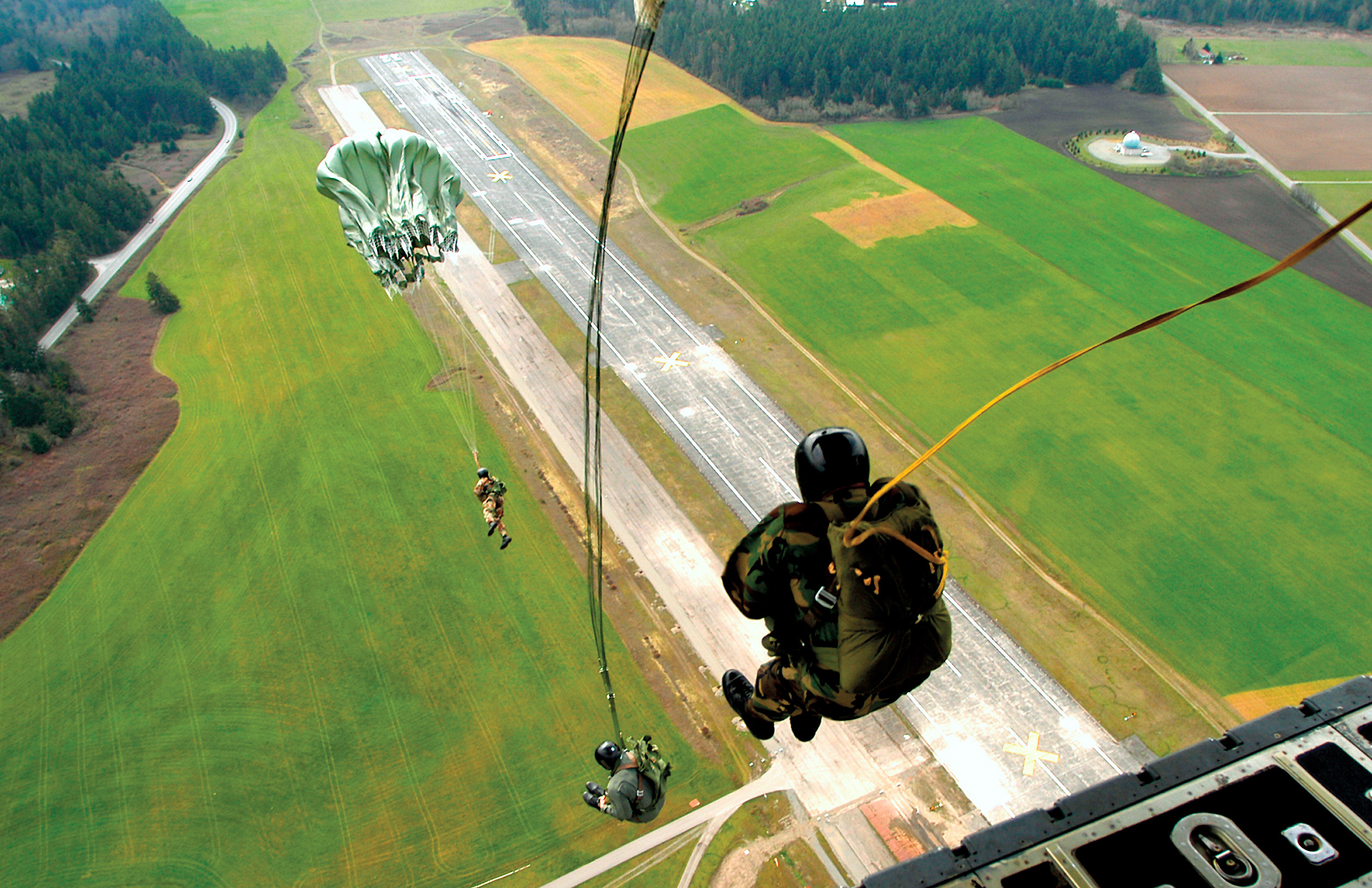
Military static line jump, from the rear of a C-130 Hercules

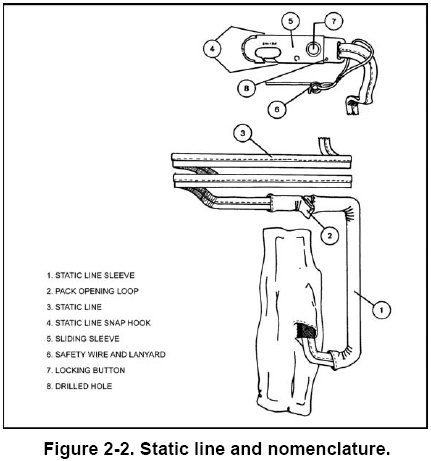
Deployment bag and permanently sewn 15-foot (4.6 m) static line assembly from military field manual for static line parachuting

A static line is a fixed cord attached to a large, stable object. It is used to open parachutes automatically for paratroopers and novice parachutists.

== Design and use ==
A static line is a cord attached at one end to the aircraft and at the other end to the top of the jumper's "D-Bag" (deployment bag, into which the canopy is packed). The parachutist's fall from the aircraft causes the static line to become taut, this then pulls the D-Bag out of the container on the jumper's back. The static line and D-Bag stay with the aircraft as the jumper leaves, and are pulled back into the aircraft by the dispatcher. Now free of its D-Bag, the canopy is allowed to inflate as the jumper continues to fall. Effectively, the parachute is dragged behind the jumper, causing the upward-rushing wind to force open and inflate the canopy. The canopy should inflate and begin supporting the jumper within four seconds. In the unlikely event of a malfunction, students are taught how to cut away the main canopy and deploy the reserve chute. The aim of static line progression is to train students to maintain the correct, stable body position upon exiting the aircraft, and to teach how to deploy the canopy via the pilot chute mechanism.

As mentioned above the parachutist must adopt and maintain a stable body position throughout deployment to minimize the chances of a parachute malfunction. This method of parachute deployment is commonly used in several ways:

- Training student skydivers, e.g. in the Ram Air Progression System
- BASE jumping
- Military paratroopers jumping from very low altitudes (400 ft (120 m))

Static line jumping carries risk of injury that, according to one study, doubles when performed in combat.

For training students in civilian operations, modifications to existing static line equipment may be made to simplify operations. One such modification is to attach the deployment bag to the parachute instead of the static line, which also requires some modification to allow the static line to detach, typically a Velcro fastener. This leaves much less material "in the wind" behind the plane after the jumper has left. Aerodynamic drag from these materials are not a problem for larger cargo aircraft used in military jumping, but presents a major issue for smaller aircraft used in civilian operations. This modification also results in a somewhat slower opening, which softens the opening shock at the cost of altitude, a minor concern for jumpers exiting at 2,800 ft (850 m).

== In popular culture ==
The popular American military song "Blood on the Risers" is a cautionary tale about a rookie paratrooper falling to his death, because he failed to hook in his static line before jumping from the plane ("He jumped into the icy blast, his static line unhooked").

== See also ==
- Accelerated freefall
