= Glenn L. Martin =

American aviation pioneer (1886–1955)

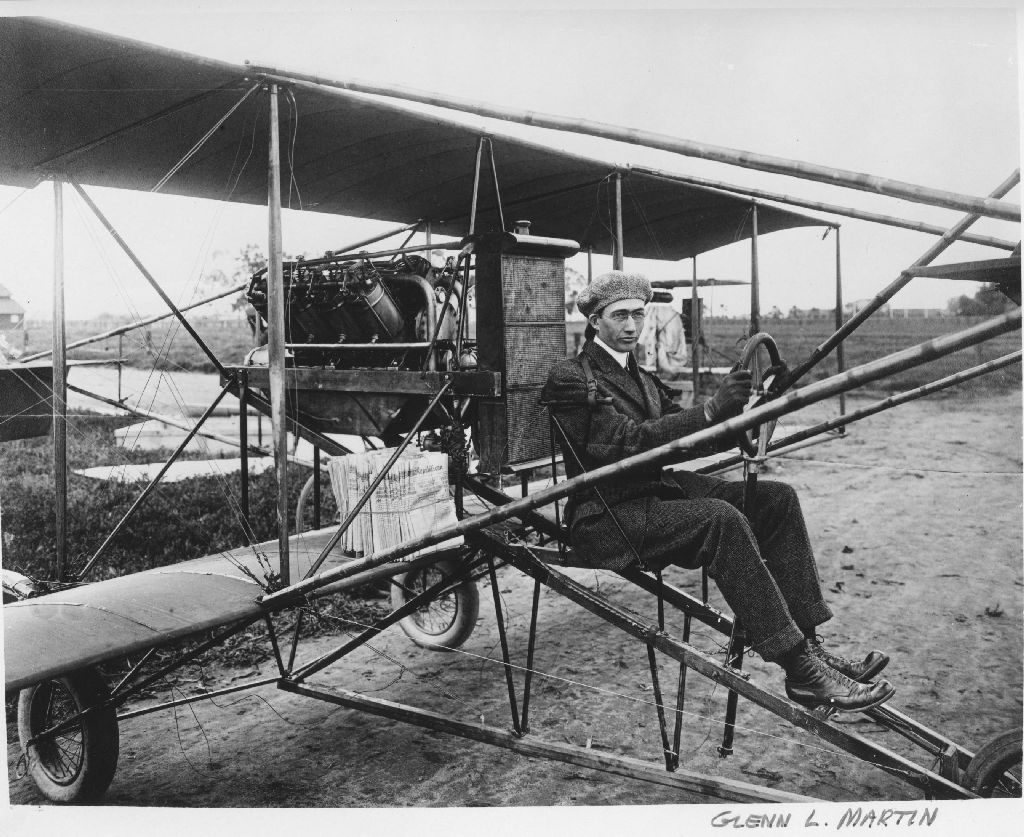
- Martin in a pusher-biplane, c. 1912
- Born: Glenn Luther Martin; January 17, 1886; Macksburg, Iowa, U.S.
- Died: December 5, 1955 (aged 69); Baltimore, Maryland, U.S.
- Occupations: Pilot, aircraft engineer and entrepreneur
- Known for: Aviation pioneer
- Awards: Collier Trophy (1932); Daniel Guggenheim Medal (1940); National Aviation Hall of Fame (1966)

Glenn Luther Martin (January 17, 1886 – December 5, 1955) was an early American aviation pioneer. He designed and built his own aircraft and was an active pilot, as well as an aviation record-holder. He founded an aircraft company in 1912 which through several mergers amalgamated into what is today known as Lockheed Martin.

== Early years ==
Glenn L. Martin was born in Macksburg, Iowa, on January 17, 1886, to Minta and Clarence Martin. At the age of two, Martin's family moved to Salina, Kansas, so that his father could run a wheat farm. By age six, he became interested in kites, but at first his friends made fun of box-kites he built. When the kites flew well, people paid him twenty-five cents to build one for them. He turned his mother's kitchen into a "factory" to produce more kites. Martin also began using sails on everything from ice skates to wagons, and even his bicycle to move faster with less effort.

He attended and studied business at Kansas Wesleyan in Salina, Kansas. In 1933, he received an honorary Bachelor of Science degree from Kansas Wesleyan University.

== Aviation career begins ==
As he grew up, he became fascinated with flight, first with kites, then later the Wright brothers' airplane. In 1909 he decided to build one himself based on the Curtiss June Bug, but it was destroyed on the first test flight. For his next effort, Martin used silk and bamboo in the aircraft's construction. This airplane made a short flight. Martin was often assisted by his mother Minta Martin holding a lamp in the building of his first few airplanes.

== Over water record ==
On May 10, 1912, Martin flew a self-built seaplane from Newport Bay, California to Avalon on Catalina Island, then back across the channel. This broke the earlier English Channel record for over-water flight. Martin's total distance was 68 miles (109 km), with the Newport-Avalon leg taking 37 minutes. He picked up a bag of mail on the island on the way, and was presented with $100 ($2600 in 2019) prize for his achievement. In 1913, Martin was not as fortunate while competing in the Great Lakes Reliability Cruise, a 900 miles (1,400 km) race of seaplanes around the Great Lakes. Martin's pontoon hit a wave at high speed and low altitude, causing the plane to somersault, and sink to the bottom with Martin, who escaped and attempted to salvage the plane to finish the race.

== Hollywood ==
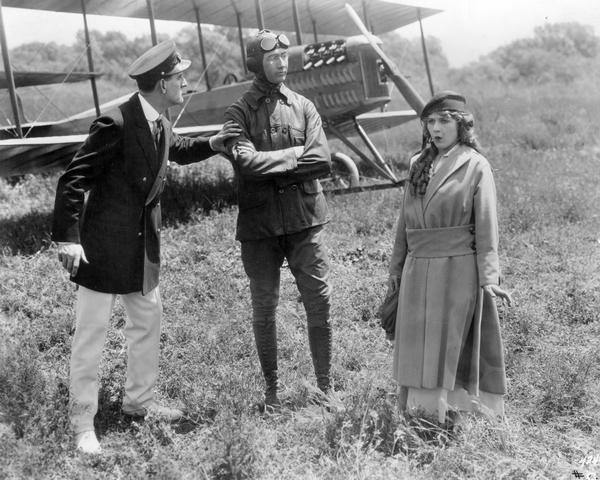
Kenneth Douglas, Glenn Martin and Mary Pickford in the silent comedy A Girl of Yesterday (1915). A Martin Model TT biplane is behind them.

In 1912, Martin built an airplane factory in an old Methodist church in Los Angeles, California. To make money to finance this business, he began stunt-flying at fairs and local airfields. He saw an advertisement for a pilot/airplane owner to play a role in a movie. Sensing an opportunity to market his airplanes, he replied to the ad and got the part of a dashing hero in the 1915 production A Girl of Yesterday starring Mary Pickford. Soon, however, Martin realized that film production was more difficult than he anticipated. In addition to flying Pickford around in his airplane, he had a scene where he had to kiss Frances Marion, who later became a legendary Hollywood screenwriter. Martin in describing his hesitance having to kiss Marion declared, "my mother would not like it" which astounded Pickford. He worked up the courage however after persuasion by Paramount boss Adolph Zukor and completed the scene.

== Achievements ==
Martin held a record for longest American over-water flight, 66 miles. His company designed aircraft for the military, including bombers for both world wars. An early success came during World War I with production of the MB-1 bomber. The MB-2 and others were also successful.

In 1932, Martin won the Collier Trophy for his involvement with the Martin B-10 bomber.

== Companies ==
He founded the Glenn L. Martin Company in 1912. In 1916 he merged his company with the original Wright Company, forming the Wright-Martin Aircraft Company. He soon left and founded a second Glenn L. Martin Company in 1917. That company merged with the American-Marietta Corporation in 1961, becoming the Martin Marietta Corporation. This company merged with the Lockheed Corporation in 1995, forming Lockheed Martin, a major U.S. aerospace and defense contractor. In the 1940s, towards the end of Martin's life, he and his beloved and now aged mother Minta were photographed touring the Martin facilities in Baltimore and celebrating Martin's success as one of the captains in the aviation industry.

== The Glenn L. Martin Company moves to Maryland ==
In 1925, the Industrial Bureau contacted Glenn Martin at his plant in Cleveland, Ohio. Glenn Martin's younger cousin Jonathan “Jack” Martin would stay in the Ohio area, founding the company that would eventually become the Martin Collier Phillips Corporation. It was the Bureau's job to attract Martin to Maryland. After speaking with Martin, a site in Middle River was chosen. From this point it was a three-year-long struggle to acquire the land needed from forty-five property owners. This struggle involved convincing the citizens that this was going to become a booming industry and would provide many jobs in the area. In 1928, the Glenn L. Martin Company moved to Maryland, bringing hundreds of much needed jobs, an airport, and a booming aviation industry. In 1931 he joined the Maryland Club.

== Death ==
He died from complications of a stroke on December 5, 1955, in Baltimore, Maryland.

== Legacy ==
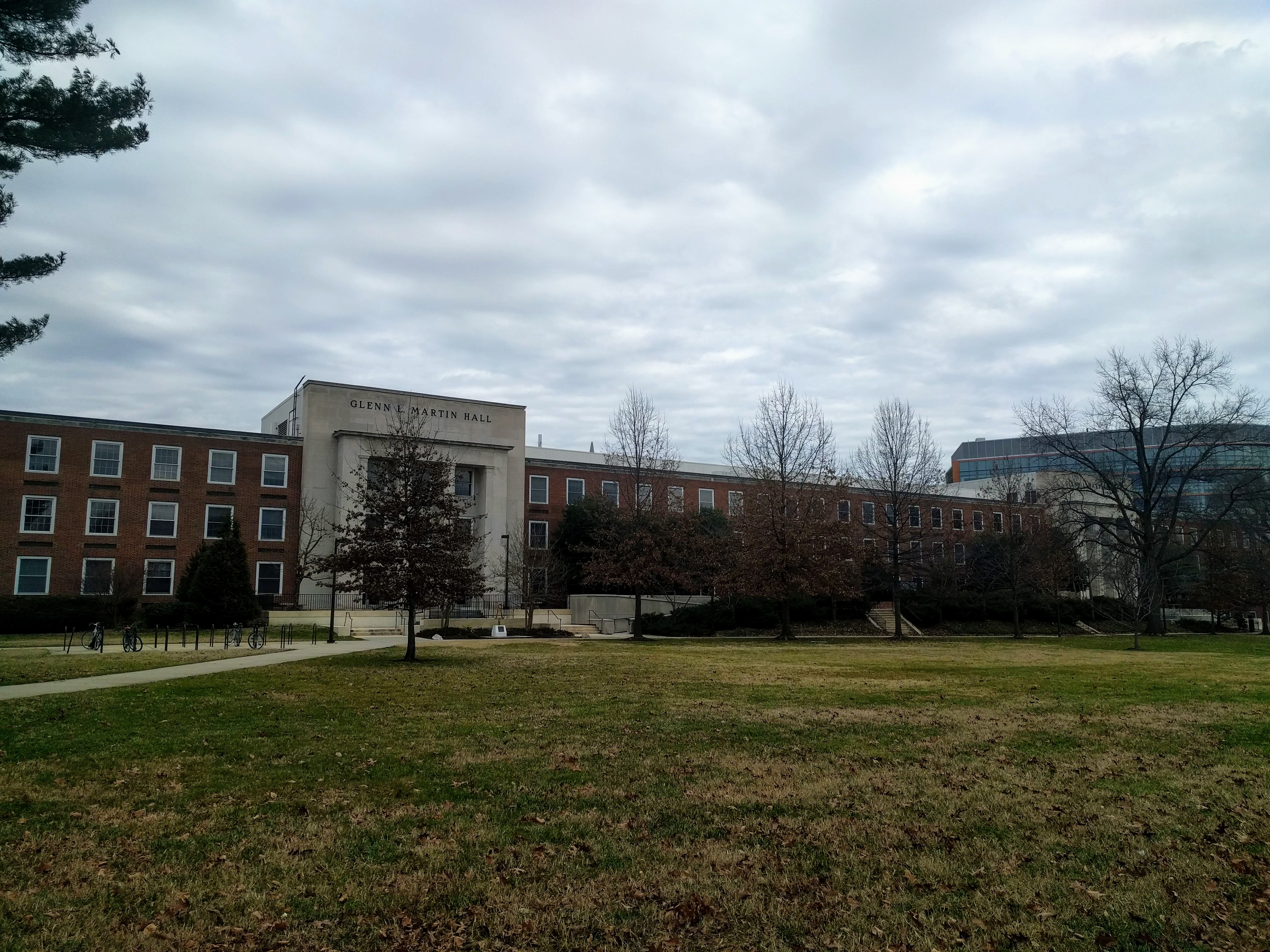
Glenn L. Martin Hall at the University of Maryland, College Park

Martin's donations to the University of Maryland, College Park, created the Glenn L. Martin Institute of Technology, which includes the A. James Clark School of Engineering. The university's wind tunnel and a classroom building (the home of the Department of Aerospace Engineering and other units) also bear Martin's name.

Martin donated 2,569 acres to the Fish and Wildlife Service to create Glenn Martin National Wildlife Refuge on the Eastern Shore of Maryland.

The Glenn L. Martin Stadium on the campus of Kansas Wesleyan University opened in 1940; it was demolished in 2014.

In 1945, Glenn L. Martin founded the AAABA National Baseball Tournament in Johnstown, Pennsylvania. The tournament continues to be played each August at the Point Stadium.

In 1951, Glenn L. Martin Elementary School opened in Santa Ana, California.

In 1966, Martin was inducted in the National Aviation Hall of Fame in Dayton, Ohio.

In 1977, Martin was inducted into the International Air & Space Hall of Fame.

== Commemorations ==
USPS Building Bridges Special Postal Cancellation Series commemorated the 110th Anniversary of Glenn L. Martin's first flight with a series of 5 postal cancellations in 3 cities with world premieres of trumpet solo and clarinet/vocal/guitar arrangements of "Break Free on Wings of Music" by Kendall Ross Bean, and the retracing of Glenn Martin's flight path on May 10, 1912.
