= Albert Leo Stevens =

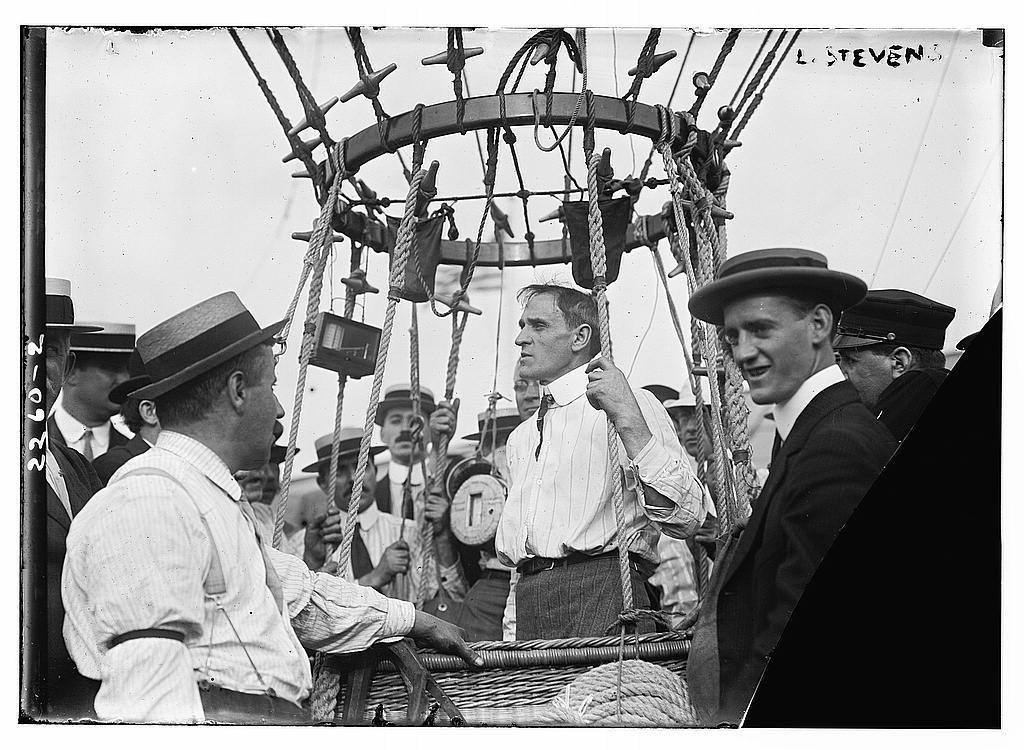
- Stevens ascent from Wanamaker's in Manhattan on July 8, 1911
- Born: March 9, 1877; Cleveland, Ohio, U.S.
- Died: May 8, 1944 (aged 67); Bardonia, New York, U.S.
- Spouses: Julia; Laura
- Relatives: Frank Stevens (?-1958), brother

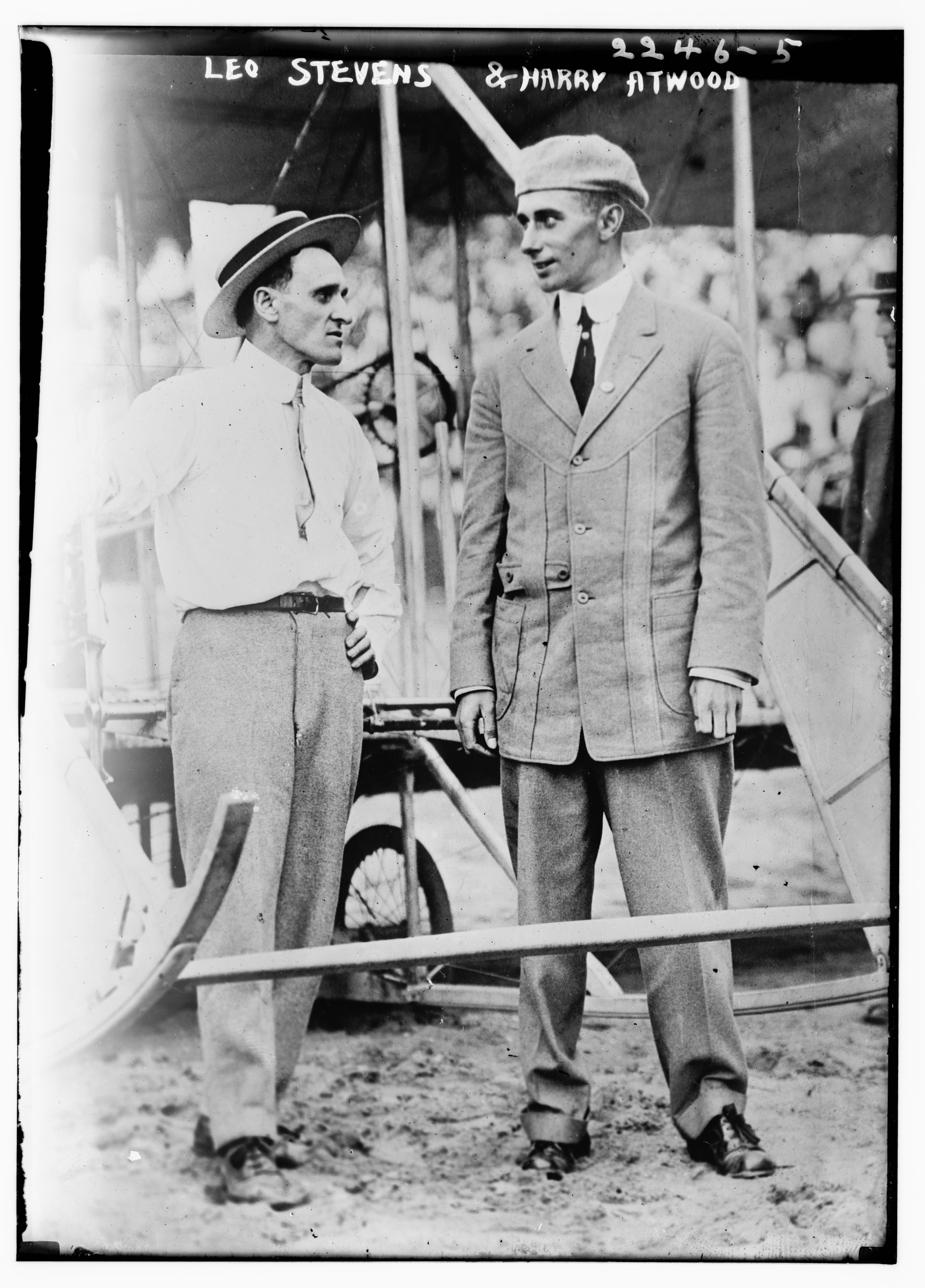
Stevens and Harry Nelson Atwood in 1911

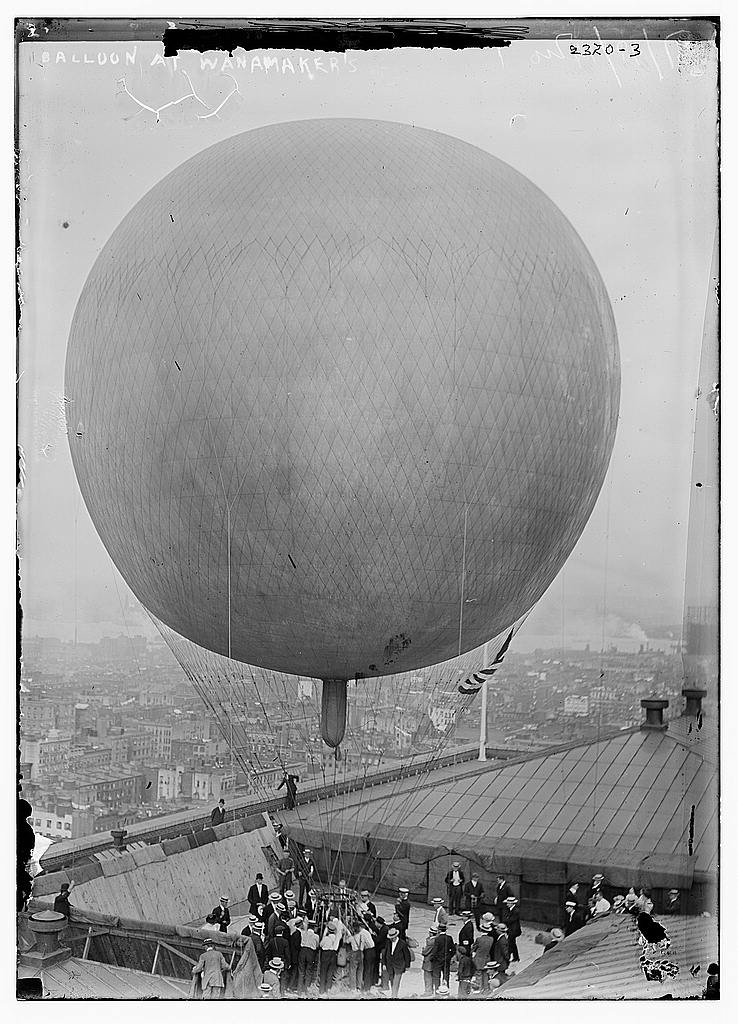
Albert Leo Stevens balloon at Manhattan Wanamaker's

Albert Leo Stevens (March 9, 1877 – May 8, 1944) was an American pioneering balloonist.

== Biography ==
He was born on March 9, in 1873 or 1877, in Cleveland, Ohio, of Czech parentage. He had brother Frank Stevens (1875–1958).

He started making balloon ascents in 1889 at age 12, and began manufacturing balloons and dirigibles at the age of 20 in 1893. In 1895, he made his first parachute jump from a church spire in Montreal, Quebec, Canada. Stevens also played a key role in the development of safety features for parachutes.

He participated in the Gordon Bennett Cup balloon races, and flew one of the first dirigibles in the United States in 1906. He opened the first private airfield in the nation in 1909.

On July 8, 1911, he ascended in a balloon from the Wanamaker's store in New York City, heading toward Philadelphia, but got lost in some fog and landed in West Nyack, New York.

During World War I he was a US Army instructor.

Stevens died on May 8, 1944, at age 67.

== Legacy ==
The A. Leo Stevens Parachute Medal was awarded from 1948 to 1959. The National Air and Space Museum houses the Leo Stevens Glass Plate Photography Collection, 1900-1915.
