= Harold R. Harris =

United States Army Air Forces general

Harold Ross Harris
- Harold R. Harris in 1950.
- Born: December 20, 1895; Chicago, Illinois, U.S.
- Died: July 28, 1988 (aged 92); Falmouth, Massachusetts, U.S.
- Military career
- Allegiance: United States of America
- Branch: United States Army Air Forces
- Service years: 1917–1929, 1942–1946
- Rank: Brigadier General
- Commands: Chief of Staff, Air Transport Command
- Conflicts: World War I World War II
- Awards: Distinguished Service Medal; Legion of Merit; Air Medal
- Other work: vice-president of Pan American Airways

Harris circa 1922

The wreckage of Harris's airplane

Harold Ross Harris (December 20, 1895 – July 28, 1988) was an American test pilot and U.S. Army Air Force officer who held 26 flying records. He made the first flight by American pilots over the Alps from Italy to France, successfully tested the world's first pressurized aircraft, was the first airman to safely escape from an aircraft by "bailing out" using a free-fall parachute.

Harold R. Harris died in his home in Falmouth, Massachusetts on July 28, 1988, at age 92.

== Decorations ==

USAF Command Pilot wings
1st Row	Army Distinguished Service Medal	Legion of Merit		Air Medal
2nd Row	World War I Victory Medal with battle clasp	American Campaign Medal	European-African-Middle Eastern Campaign Medal with two service stars	World War II Victory Medal
3rd Row	Commander of the Order of the British Empire	Knight of the Order of the Crown of Italy	Order of Abdon Calderón (Ecuador)	Officer of the Order of the Sun (Peru)
