= July 1966 =

Month of 1966

<<	July 1966					>>
Su	Mo	Tu	We	Th	Fr	Sa
					1	2
3	4	5	6	7	8	9
10	11	12	13	14	15	16
17	18	19	20	21	22	23
24	25	26	27	28	29	30
31

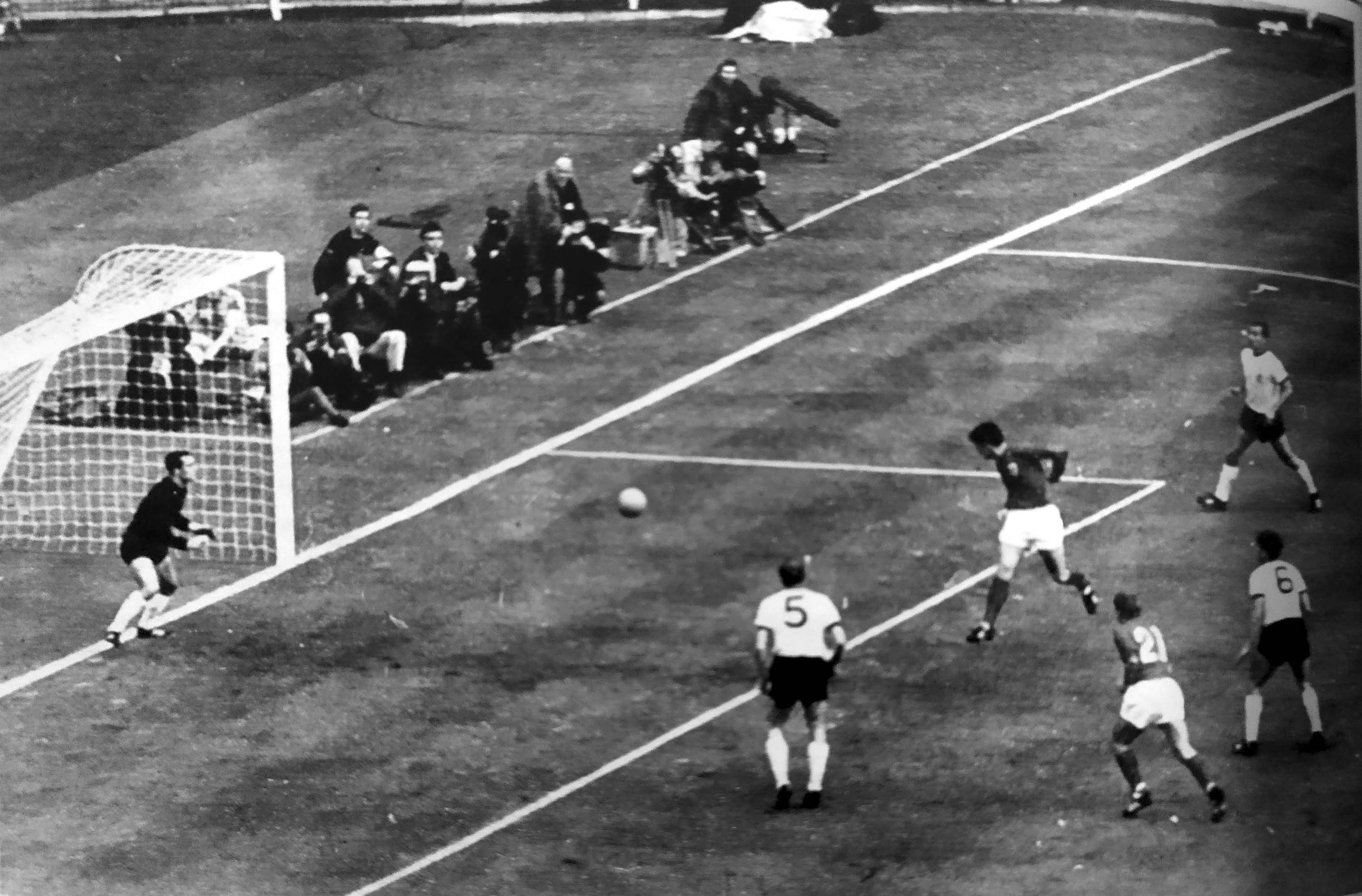
July 30, 1966: England defeats West Germany 4 to 2 to win the FIFA World Cup at Wembley Stadium

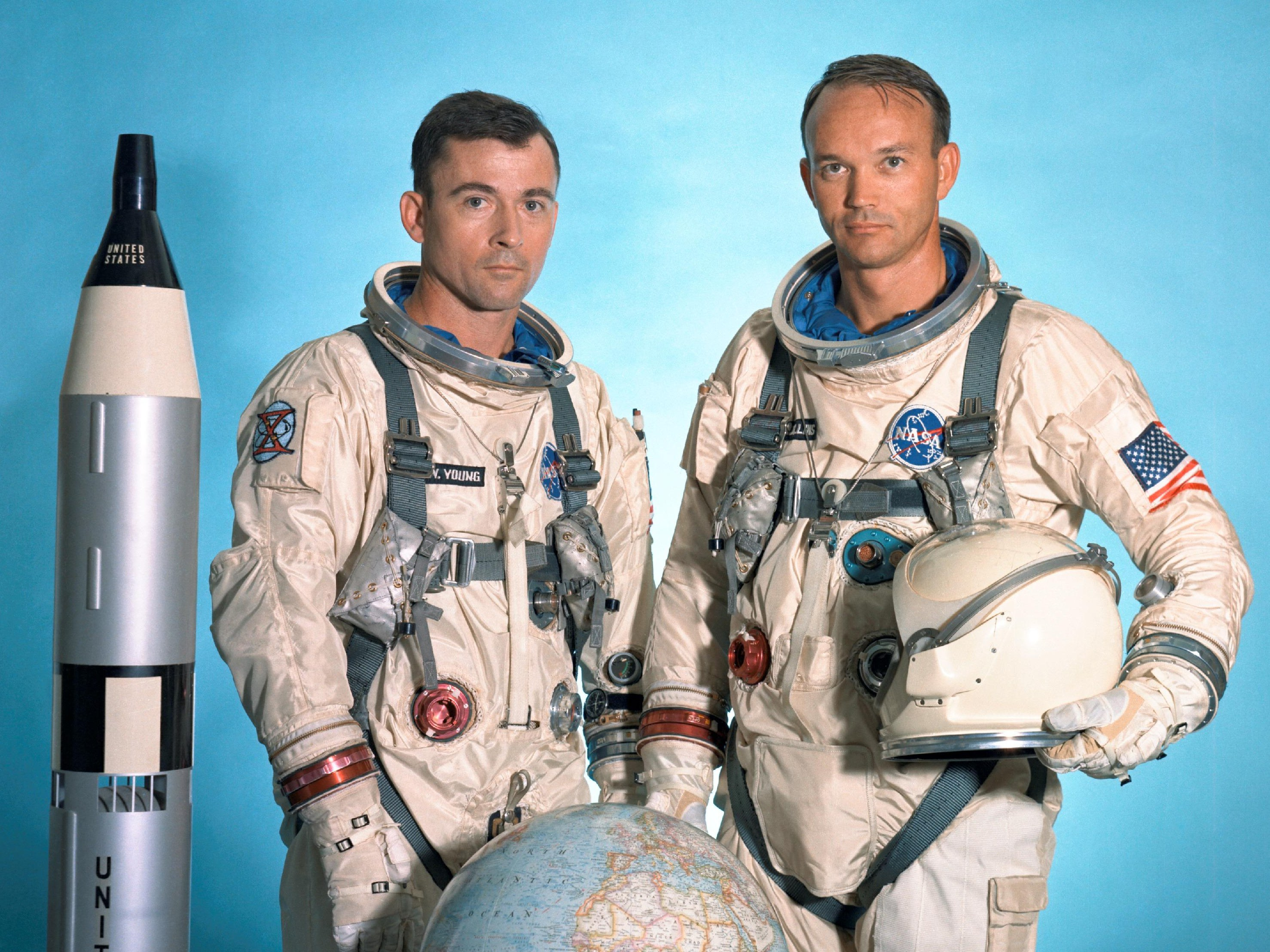
July 18, 1966: Young and Collins go further from Earth than anyone before

The following events occurred in July 1966:

== July 1, 1966 (Friday) ==
- The League of Communists of Yugoslavia, the nation's Communist Party organization, began a purge of members, firing Vice-President Aleksandar Ranković, who had been viewed as a likely successor to President Josip Broz Tito, but was accused of wiretapping Tito's home. Dropped also was Svetislav Stefanovic, former Deputy Prime Minister and a former director of Yugoslavia's secret police, the UDBA, who was fired from his post in the Central Committee. The meeting of the Central Committee took place at the Hotel Istra on the island of Brioni, where Tito resided during the summer.
- The Medicare program went into operation in the United States, as the new federal health insurance program for people 65 years and older started. Patients who were already in American hospitals became the first people to be transferred over to the new system. That date, and the implementation of the Medicaid program for low-income families and disabled younger individuals six months later, one author notes, "were the key dates after which Americans began outspending the rest of the world on health care".
- The first American attempt to put a satellite into lunar orbit failed when Explorer 33's speed was calculated to be off by 17/10,000ths. The 208-pound (94 kg) probe needed a velocity of 21,135 miles per hour (34,013 km/h) and was 36 miles per hour (58 km/h) too fast. In that an orbit around the Moon could no longer be achieved, ground control fired braking rockets and set the Explorer 33 into a wide Earth orbit.
- Five cities in the Democratic Republic of Congo were renamed on the sixth anniversary of the nation's independence from Belgium. The capital, Leopoldville, became Kinshasa, and Stanleyville changed to Kisangani. Elisabethville changed to Lubumbashi, Coquilhatville to Mbandaka, and Paulis to Isiro.
- The South African cargo liner South African Seafarer ran aground in Table Bay and broke in two. All 76 people on board were rescued by South African Air Force helicopters.
- Manuel Santana became the first Spanish winner of the Wimbledon tournament, defeating American finalist Dennis Ralston in straight sets, 6–4, 11–9 and 6–4.
- Joaquín Balaguer was inaugurated as President of the Dominican Republic.
- Died: Pauline Boty, 28, British pop artist; of cancer

== July 2, 1966 (Saturday) ==
- France began the first of 44 atmospheric tests of nuclear weapons in the South Pacific Ocean, detonating a 28-kiloton weapon that had been mounted on a barge in the lagoon of the Mururoa Atoll in an experiment codenamed "Aldebaran". Two more tests would be performed that month, on the 19th and the 21st of July. Atmospheric tests would continue until September 14, 1974. On June 5, 1975, the French started underground testing.
- The Beatles became the first musical group to perform at the Nippon Budokan Hall in Tokyo. The performance ignited protests from local citizens who felt that it was inappropriate for a rock and roll band to play at Budokan.
- Billie Jean King of the United States won the first of her six Wimbledon singles championships, and her first of 12 events in the "Grand Slam" of tennis, defeating Maria Bueno of Brazil, 6–3, 3–6 and 6–1.
- Died:
  - John Maximovich, 70, Ukrainian-born Archbishop of San Francisco of the Russian Orthodox Church Outside Russia, who would later be venerated as a saint within the church.
  - Jan Brzechwa, 67, Polish poet

== July 3, 1966 (Sunday) ==
- René Barrientos, who had resigned from his position as Chief of the Bolivian Armed Forces and from the ruling military junta in order to run as a civilian, was elected as President of Bolivia, defeating four other candidates by a 3 to 1 majority. Running with Luis Adolfo Siles on the ticket of the Bolivian Revolutionary Front (FRB), Barientos captured more than 491,000 votes compared to a total of 115,000 for the opposition candidates, and would take office on August 6. Barrientos, who was fluent in the Quechua language as well as Spanish and who had campaigned by helicopter as he traveled from one rally to the next, would be killed in a helicopter crash on April 27, 1969, and be succeeded by Siles.
- Thirty-one people were arrested when a demonstration by approximately 4,000 anti-Vietnam War protesters in front of the U.S. Embassy in London's Grosvenor Square turned violent.

== July 4, 1966 (Monday) ==
- Queen Elizabeth II of the United Kingdom and her consort, Prince Philip, were attacked twice as their car traveled through Donegal Square in Belfast in Northern Ireland. As they were being driven from the City Hall at the conclusion of a luncheon, a woman smashed a beer bottle against their Rolls-Royce limousine. Two minutes later, a 30-pound (14 kg) concrete block was hurled from the fourth floor of a building, and struck the bonnet of the car. "Had it fallen a few feet farther back," an Associated Press report noted, "it would have shattered the glass top over the queen's head."
- American President Lyndon B. Johnson signed the Freedom of Information Act, which went into effect on July 4, 1967. "For the first time," an author would note in 1967, "the Congress has declared— and the President has accepted— the principle that inherent in the citizen's right to speak and right to print is the right to know."
- Edward Short replaced Tony Benn as Postmaster General in the United Kingdom. Benn was shifted over to become Minister of Technology, replacing Frank Cousins who had resigned the previous day.

== July 5, 1966 (Tuesday) ==
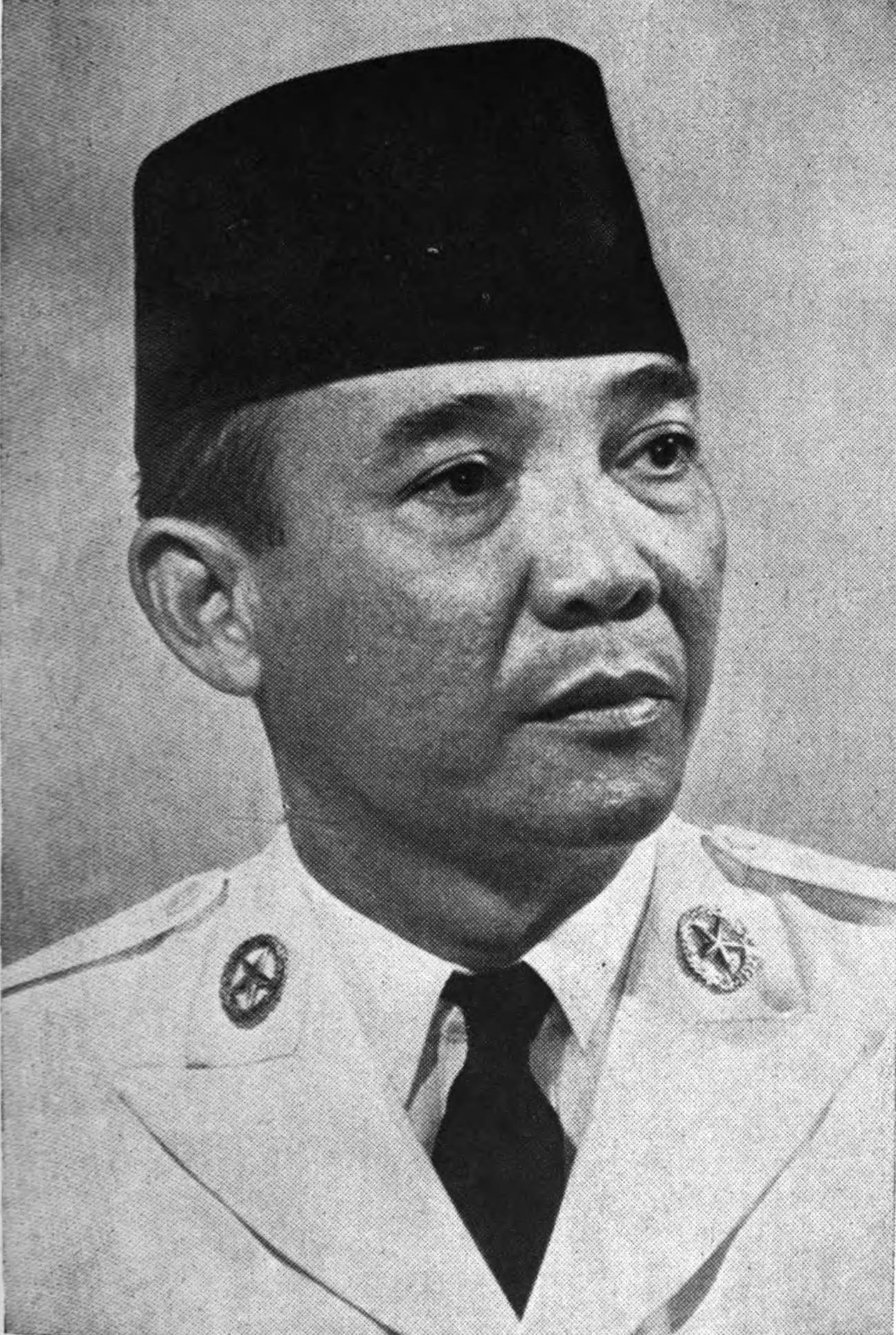
President Sukarno

- Sukarno, the founder of the modern republic of Indonesia, was stripped of his title of "President for Life", and of all responsibilities except for ceremonial duties, in the closing session of the Provisional People's Consultative Assembly (Majelis Permusyawaratan Rakyat Sementara or MPRS). In addition, a committee was appointed to review all of his decrees, proclamations and teachings, and Lieutenant General Suharto, who had been the de facto leader since March, was authorized to serve as "acting President" for most purposes.
- Public shares of the fast food magnate McDonald's Corporation began trading on the New York Stock Exchange, with 2,587,000 shares of common stock for the 11-year-old restaurant chain that had 800 locations, and opening at $32 per share. Over five years, with stock splits and increasing prices on more shares, the value of an investment made that day would increase to 68.75 times its original worth within six years, so that an original $32 investment would be worth $2,200.
- On their way back home after their Asian concert tour, The Beatles arrived in India for the first time, after having experimented with Indian instruments such as the sitar. Earlier in the day, they had been permitted to depart the Philippines, where they had faced a hostile reception from the government and the public, and flew from Manila to Delhi. During their two-day stay, there was minimal protection from the police as thousands of fans followed them everywhere.
- Died: George de Hevesy, 80, Hungarian chemist, 1943 Nobel Prize laureate and co-discoverer of the element hafnium

== July 6, 1966 (Wednesday) ==
- The Hanoi March was conducted, with 52 American prisoners of war (POWs) forced to walk for 2 miles (3.2 km) through the streets of the capital of North Vietnam to be shown off before tens of thousands of North Vietnamese civilians. The action came in the wake of the bombing raids near Hanoi a week earlier. The U.S. servicemen were drawn from two prison camps, with 16 from the Briarpatch at Xom Ap Lo and 36 from "The Zoo" at Cu Loc. They were chained in pairs, and were paraded along Tràng Tiền Street, and then along Hàng Bông and Nguyễn Thái Học streets in front of an increasingly angry mob. Over the next hour, many of the men were beaten by civilians as the planned event went out of control before the group finally reached the relative safety of the Hàng Đây Stadium, before being returned to the prison camps. Among the 52 were U.S. Navy pilot (and future U.S. Senator) Jeremiah Denton of Alabama, U.S. Air Force Captain Charles G. Boyd (who would retire in 1995 as a four-star general), and U.S. Navy pilot Everett Alvarez, Jr., who would spend more than eight years in captivity.
- "Operation Washington" began in the Vietnam War as U.S. Army Lieutenant Colonel Arthur J. Sullivan, battalion commander of 1st Recon Battalion, moved his battalion headquarters to Hau Doc, 25 kilometres (16 mi) west of Chu Lai. In eight days his reconnaissance teams would cover 400 square kilometres (150 sq mi) of his area of operation, sighting 46 enemy forces scattered throughout the dense jungle terrain, roughly equating to 200 soldiers at most. The ground combat and supporting elements resulted in 13 of the enemy soldiers dead, with four prisoners. Because of the poor results, General Lewis J. Fields, the commanding general of the Chu Lai TOAR, ended the operation on July 14, 1966.
- The east African nation of Malawi became a republic, two years after it had been granted independence from the United Kingdom. Dr. Hastings Kamuzu Banda, the Prime Minister, was sworn in as the first President of Malawi. Glyn Smallwood Jones, the British colonial administrator whose post as the first and only Governor-General of Malawi was abolished, returned to England, but would continue to work for the Malawian government as director of its Malawi Buying and Trading Agency in London.
- At Houston, Manned Spacecraft Center (MSC) Deputy Director George M. Low was appointed Acting Manager of the newly established Apollo Applications Program Office. Robert F. Thompson was named Assistant Manager. Leland F. Belew was designated Manager of the Manned Spaceflight Center. The two new offices were responsible for all "activities concerned with projects using Apollo hardware for purposes in addition to the manned lunar landing."

== July 7, 1966 (Thursday) ==
- The U.S. Department of Defense declared a new policy, to take effect immediately, of a hardship discharge from American military service for any men "who become qualified sole surviving sons subsequent to their enlistment or induction", but only if the applicant's brother or father had been in the military and had died "as a result of hazards incident to their service in the armed forces".
- Jimmy Hoffa was re-elected, without opposition, to a third five-year term as president of the Teamsters Union, despite having been convicted of jury tampering and mail fraud in court verdicts that were stayed pending review on appeal. Delegates in Miami Beach also elected Frank Fitzsimmons as first vice-president, to become President "if Hoffa has to serve a jail term".
- The Warsaw Pact conference in Bucharest ended with a joint declaration by the European Communist nations to send volunteers to Vietnam if requested for such support by the North Vietnamese government. The members making the pledge were the Soviet Union, Bulgaria, Czechoslovakia, East Germany, Hungary, Poland and Romania.

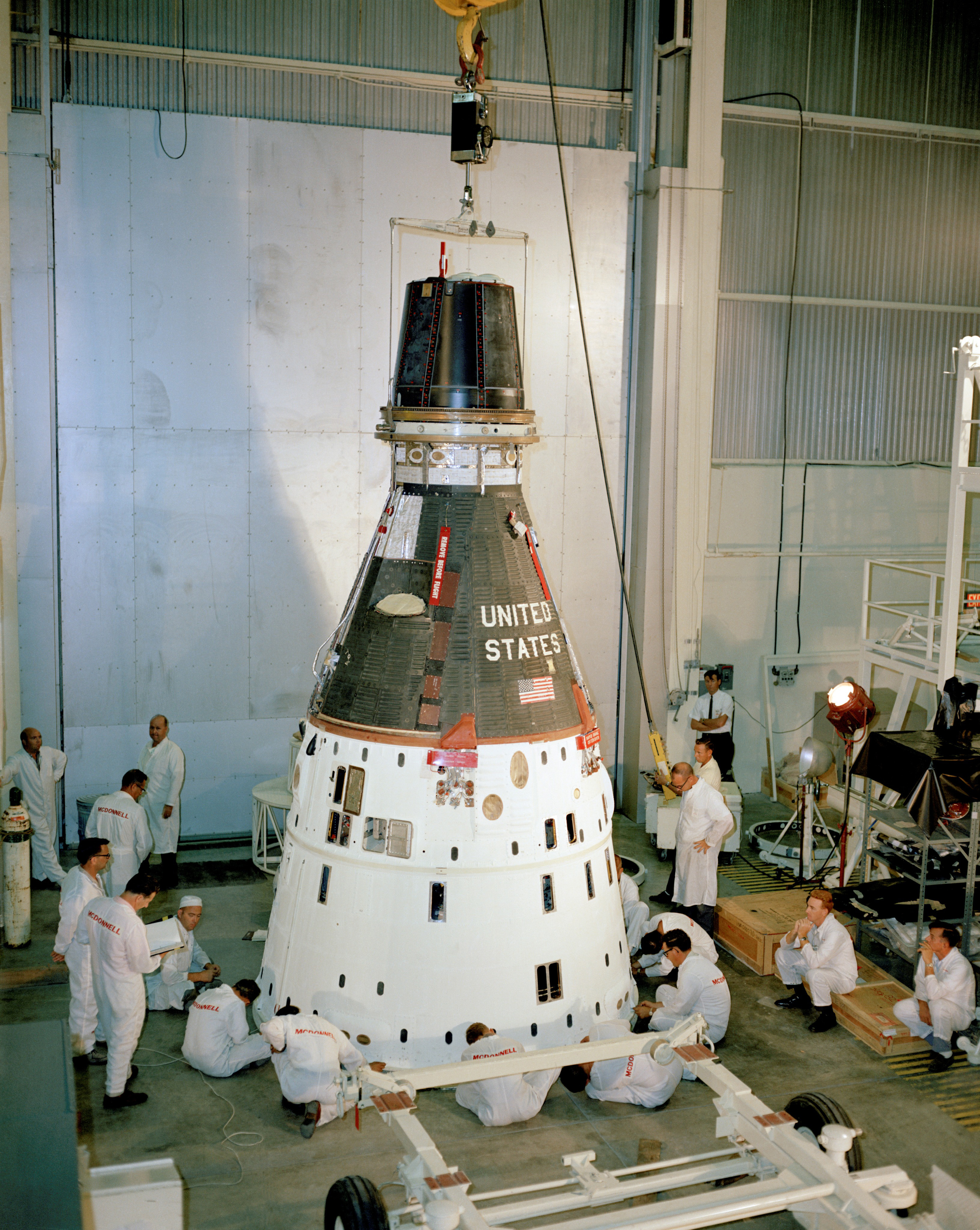
McDonnell personnel with Gemini 11 spacecraft at Merritt Island

- Air-to-air missiles were used in combat for the first time as American F-105 fighters found themselves being fired upon by rockets from two MiG-21 jets in the skies over North Vietnam.
- McDonnell Aircraft Corporation delivered Gemini spacecraft No. 11 to Cape Kennedy. After fuel and pyrotechnic installation and preliminary checks, the spacecraft was moved to the Merritt Island Launch Area for Plan X integrated tests with the target vehicle on July 25.

== July 8, 1966 (Friday) ==
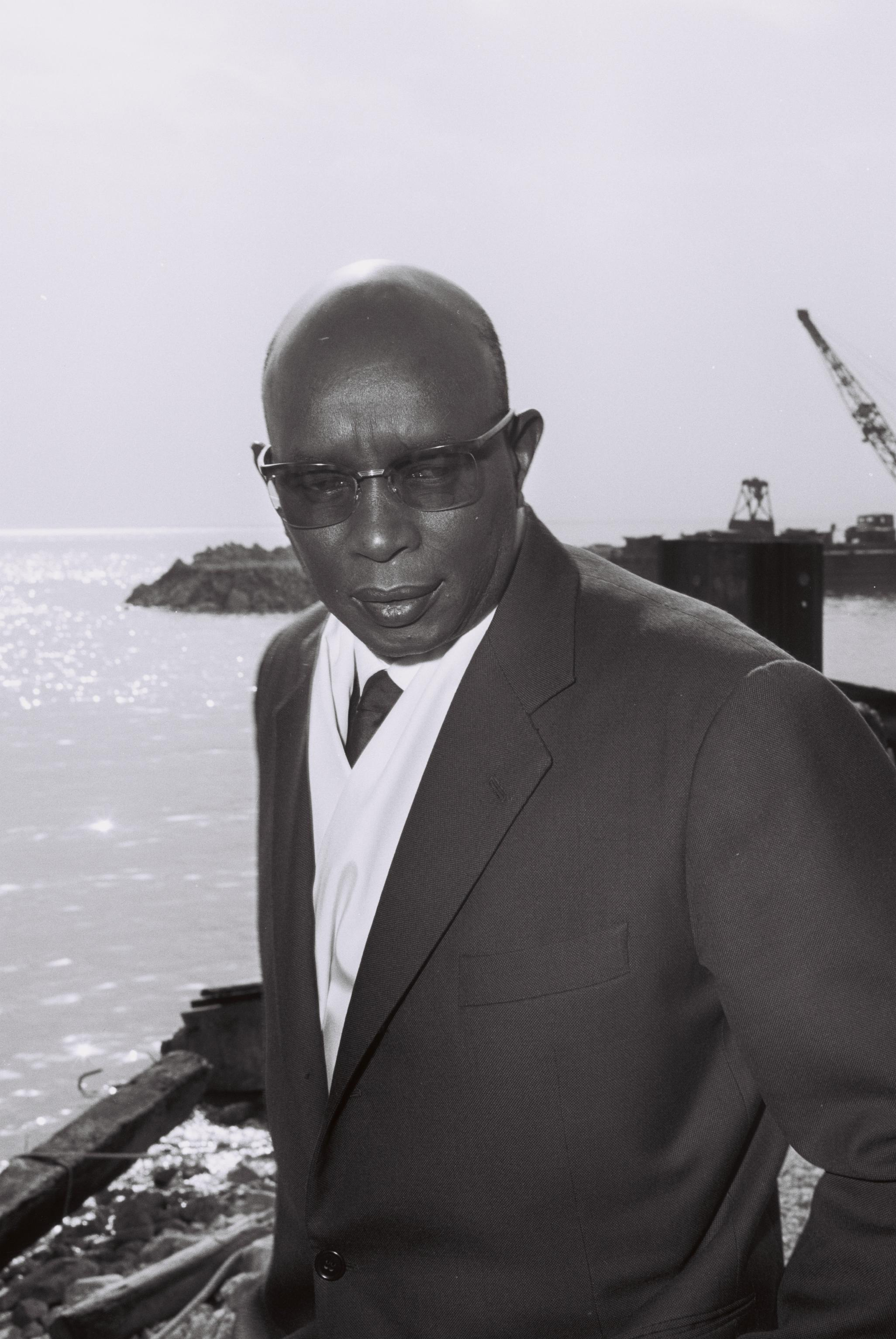
King Mwambutsa IV

- While vacationing in Europe, King Mwambutsa IV Bangiriceng of Burundi was deposed by his 18-year-old son, Crown Prince Charles Ndizeye, who proclaimed himself to be King Ntare V. The new king rewarded 26-year-old Burundian Army captain Michel Micombero, who had masterminded the takeover, by appointing him as Prime Minister on July 11. The new king would reign for less than five months, and would be overthrown and sent into exile by Micombero, who would abolish the monarchy and declare himself President of Burundi.
- The 35,300 mechanics and ground service personnel working for five major U.S. airlines (United, Northwest, TWA, Eastern and National) walked out on strike after a vote taken by the International Association of Machinists. Although carriers such as Delta, Continental and Pan American were not affected, the five lines accounted for two-thirds of the nation's passenger traffic at the time.
- Prime Minister Harold Wilson of the United Kingdom and Prime Minister Georges Pompidou of France concluded three days of conferences in London with the announcement that the two nations had agreed to construct a 21-mile-long (34 km) tunnel underneath the English Channel in order to link the two nations.
- Born: Mike Nawrocki, American animator, filmmaker, voice actor, and co-creator of VeggieTales; in Dayton, Ohio
- Died: Horst Fischer, 53, German physician at the Auschwitz concentration camp during World War II, was executed by guillotine in Leipzig, East Germany, after being convicted of war crimes by the East German Supreme Court. After the war, Dr. Fischer had practiced as a physician in the town of Fürstenwalde for 20 years before his past was discovered.

== July 9, 1966 (Saturday) ==
- Jack Nicklaus won the British Open golf tournament at Muirfield, Scotland, the first of his three victories in the tournament. Nicklaus, with 282 strokes for 72-holes, clinched the victory on the 17th hole of the final round, putting him one stroke ahead of Doug Sanders and Dave Thomas, who each finished with 283. Nicklaus became only the fourth person to win all four "grand slam" events of golf, having previously won the U.S. Open in 1962, The Masters and the PGA Championship in 1963. He joined Gene Sarazen, Ben Hogan and Gary Player in the accomplishment, and it would be 33 years before a fifth golfer, Tiger Woods, won all four tournaments.
- France's Sûreté Nationale was merged with the Préfecture de Police de la Ville de Paris to create the Police Nationale (National Police), with a common policy for maintaining law and order in all large towns (in practice, those of more than 10,000 people) in France. The Gendarmerie Nationale continued to serve as a paramilitary national police force.
- Died: Ralph A. "Daredevil" Miller, American movie stuntman who had doubled for Tom Mix and Harold Lloyd in silent films until being paralyzed in an accident in 1931. Miller was struck by a hit and run driver while crossing a street in Detroit.

== July 10, 1966 (Sunday) ==
- A heat wave began across much of the midwestern United States, killing hundreds of people over a six-day period where temperatures remained above 100 °F (38 °C). Hardest hit was the area in and around St. Louis, Missouri, where 149 people, most of them elderly, died from heat exhaustion. New York City officials reported that the number of deaths from natural causes was 650 higher than normal during the week, although only 17 of the 2,250 people had died directly from heat stroke.
- Legendary African-American singer Marian Anderson gave her final public performance, appearing in a concert with the Chicago Symphony Orchestra.
- Born: Doug TenNapel, American cartoonist and video game designer, known for creating the Earthworm Jim video game series

== July 11, 1966 (Monday) ==
- Angus Barbieri of Tayport, Scotland, made headlines worldwide as he ended a diet of water, soda water, tea, coffee and vitamins, having lost nearly 300 pounds (140 kg). Barbieri ate his first solid food since June 14, 1965; during the 392-day fast, he went from 472 pounds (214 kg) to 179 pounds (81 kg) and commented that "I have forgotten what food tastes like." Fifty years later, he would continue to be recognized by Guinness under the category "Longest time to survive without food".
- The Newlywed Game, a TV game show described by one reviewer as "four newlywed couples answering questions which reveal how much or how little they know about each other", premiered on the ABC television network. TV critic Rick Du Brow of United Press International generally praised the show and its host, Bob Eubanks, as "quite pleasant and unpretentious" but said that the questions asked of the wives and husbands "weren't exactly life and death matters."
- Nearly all of the American state of Nebraska was blacked out by an electric power failure, as circuits were overloaded from air conditioning use during a 100 °F (38 °C) heat wave. Other than the city of Omaha, and the extreme western section of the state, all other cities, small towns and rural areas were out for several hours after the failure of a generator at Hallam, Nebraska, had a cascade effect that shut off the network.
- The new rank of Sergeant Major of the Army was created in the U.S. Army, a unique designation accorded to only one person, the most senior Army enlisted man to advise the U.S. Army Chief of Staff. Sergeant Major William O. Wooldridge of the 1st U.S. Infantry Division was sworn in by General Harold K. Johnson as the first person to hold the rank.
- At NASA, Deputy Administrator Robert C. Seamans, Jr., Associate Administrator for Manned Space Flight George E. Mueller, and Associate Administrator for Space Science and Applications Homer E. Newell made several significant decisions affecting the Apollo Applications Program and post-Apollo development planning in general. Henceforward, MSFC would be the lead Center for developing the Apollo Telescope Mount (ATM) and lunar exploration vehicles (including surface modules, supply trucks, and roving vehicles), and would be responsible for all astronomy experiments. MSC would have responsibility for Earth resources and all lunar scientific experiments.
- The 1966 FIFA World Cup began in England, with England and Uruguay playing to a 0-0 tie at Wembley in front of 75,000 people, "much less than had been expected". The other 14 nations competing were Mexico, France, West Germany, Argentina, Spain, Switzerland, Portugal, Hungary, Brazil, Bulgaria, the Soviet Union, North Korea, Italy and Chile.
- The 1966 Central American and Caribbean Games opened in San Juan, Puerto Rico, with 1,689 athletes from 18 nations.
- British Motor Corporation and Jaguar Cars announced plans to merge as British Motor Holdings.
- Born:
  - Kentaro Miura, Japanese manga artist best known for his acclaimed dark fantasy manga series Berserk; in Chiba (died of acute aortic dissection, 2021)
  - Melanie Appleby, British singer and model (died of pneumonia, 1990).
  - Elina Löwensohn, Romanian-American actress.
  - Bob Joyce, Canadian ice hockey player.
  - Allegra Curtis, German-American actress.
  - Cheb Mami, Algerian singer.
- Died: Delmore Schwartz, 52, American poet and short story writer, died of a heart attack in his room at the Chelsea Hotel, where he had lived in seclusion for several years.

== July 12, 1966 (Tuesday) ==
- The "hydrant riot" broke out in Chicago after the city's Fire Commissioner, Robert J. Quinn, ordered an immediate shutdown of all fire hydrants that had been opened on a day where the temperatures had topped 100 °F (38 °C), a standard method of beating the heat in neighborhoods where swimming pools were unavailable. There were four pools on the city's predominantly African American west side, but all four "were located in all-white, violence-prone neighborhoods". After several days of looting, destruction, and protests led by Dr. Martin Luther King Jr., Mayor Richard J. Daley would relent, ordering that police provide safe passage and protection for Black residents to use the white pools, as well as trucking in portable pools and allowing the use of the hydrants during the heat spell.
- The FBI arrested retired Lieutenant Colonel William H. Whalen at his home in Alexandria, Virginia, after he was indicted for espionage for the Soviet Union. Whalen, the highest-ranking American military man ever convicted of espionage, had served as the Intelligence Adviser for the U.S. Army Chief of Staff in the early 1960s, and would plead guilty to having sold secrets to Soviet Army Colonel Sergei Edemski and Soviet Embassy diplomat Mikhail A. Shunaev in return for $3,500. Whalen would be paroled in 1973 after serving six years of a federal prison sentence.
- Multi-millionaire industrialist Daniel H. Overmyer announced the creation of the Overmyer Network, a fourth U.S. television network that would compete with CBS, NBC and ABC and go on the air with 100 stations beginning on May 1, 1967.

== July 13, 1966 (Wednesday) ==
- Richard Speck forced his way into a nurses' dormitory that served the nearby South Chicago Community Hospital, and tied up, and then strangled, eight of the nine student nurses who lived there, including three who arrived while the crime was in progress. The killings lasted until the early morning of the next day. Speck, who would be arrested three days later, sneaked into the two-story building at 2319 East 100th Street shortly before midnight. The lone survivor in the building, Corazon Amurao, escaped notice by hiding under a bed, waited for several hours after Speck had left, and climbed out on a ledge hours later to scream for help. Two neighbors then flagged down patrolman Donald Kelly, who found the gruesome scene inside. Nearly twelve years later, Speck would claim to an interviewer from the Chicago Sun-Times that he had originally planned to rob the women, but that one of them had spit in his face and said that she would pick him out of a lineup; but for that, he said "they'd all be alive today". In the same interview, however, Speck claimed that he and an accomplice had entered the apartment, although Miss Amurao noted that he had acted alone.
- Near the village of Almagor and Israel's border with Syria, an Israel Defense Forces command car drove over a land mine that had evidently been planted by infiltrators. Two soldiers and a civilian were killed, and the government ministers on the national Security Committee voted for an immediate reprisal, in a form chosen by the Defense Minister. The next day, "Operation Wind" commenced and Israeli fighter jets destroyed heavy engineering equipment and an anti-aircraft unit at the Syrian city of Ain Sufira. The Syrians then retaliated with their own MiG-21 aircraft, and the conflict continued to escalate.
- NASA announced that responsibility for the Apollo Telescope Mount (ATM) had been assigned to MSFC. Under the agency's "phased project planning," any decision to begin ATM hardware development had to await preliminary design study and evaluation at Marshall, but the ATM was envisioned as having would comprise several high-resolution solar telescopes attached to the Apollo spacecraft, to be operated by scientist-astronauts.
- Born: Gerald Levert, American singer-songwriter for the R&B trio LeVert (d. 2006); in Philadelphia
- Died: Reino Ragnar Lehto, 68, former Prime Minister of Finland

== July 14, 1966 (Thursday) ==
- Gwynfor Evans, President of the Plaid Cymru political party that advocated independence for Wales from Great Britain, became a Member of Parliament for the United Kingdom in the by-election for Carmarthen, taking the previously Labour-held Welsh seat and giving Plaid Cymru its first representation at Westminster in its 41-year history.
- Jet fighters from Israel and Syria fought an air battle in the skies of Syria after the Israelis had raided Syrian engineering plants at the Jordan River.
- NASA and the Department of Defense established the Joint Manned Space Flight Policy Committee to coordinate human spaceflight programs of the respective organizations, superseding the Gemini Program Planning Board, established in 1963.
- Born: Tanya Donnelly, American singer-songwriter and guitarist; in Newport, Rhode Island

== July 15, 1966 (Friday) ==
- China moved to the next step in its space program by launching a dog into outer space. The male dog, "Xiao Bao", was sent up inside a T-7AS2 rocket and reached an altitude of 115 kilometres (71 mi). After the capsule returned to earth, the dog's handler brought out Xiao Bao alive and well. A female dog, "Shan Shan", was launched 13 days later and returned on July 28.
- An unidentified two-year-old boy in Denver received the first liver transplant from a chimpanzee to a human being, in an operation at the University of Colorado Medical Center. The child survived for nine days before dying of liver failure.
- Despite worldwide condemnation by its allies, the U.S. increased its bombing attacks on North Vietnam, flying 121 bombing missions, the most ever since the war began, in a single day.

== July 16, 1966 (Saturday) ==
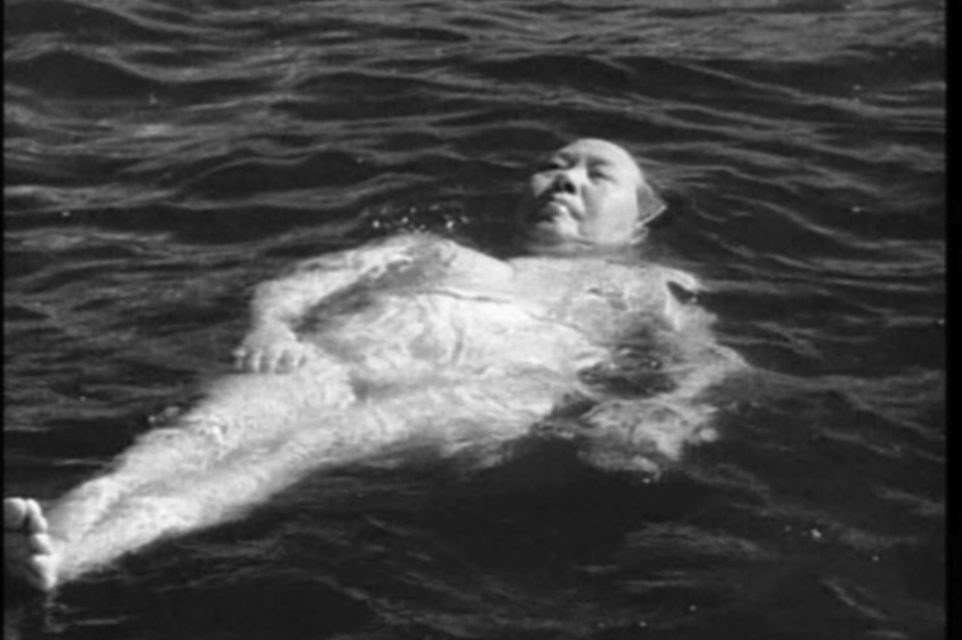
Mao swimming in the Yangtze in 1966

- Chinese Communist Party Chairman Mao Zedong inspired tens of millions of followers by swimming in the Yangtze River at the age of 73, and the photographs were turned to good effect in party propaganda and in Chairman Mao's personality cult. According to party promotions, the Chairman swam 10 miles (16 km) in an hour, albeit with the river current. An "unexpected virtue" was that hundreds of thousands of people in China were inspired to learn how to swim, and swimming became a highly competitive sport in the People's Republic.
- Chinese engineer Hsu Tsu-tsai, alleged to be China's top rocket expert, was hit by a car in the Netherlands city of The Hague, after an apparent defection attempt. He was later abducted from the city's Red Cross Hospital by Chinese officials and died of internal injuries the next day at the Chinese legation. China and the Netherlands suspended diplomatic relations, and a five-month siege of the Chinese legation followed as Dutch police sought to question Hsu's colleagues. Dutch reporters Frits De Blauw, Harry Seuneren and Link Van Bruggen would later write about the incident in a book called The Chinese Affair, alleging that Hsu had been murdered after handing over the formula for a deadly nerve gas to the American CIA.
- Chicago police picked up mass murderer Richard Speck at the Starr Hotel, transient lodging at 617 West Madison Street in Chicago, where he had attempted suicide by slashing his wrists. Unaware that they had the suspect (who had registered as "B. Brian") in their custody, police took him to the Cook County Hospital, where an emergency room surgeon, Dr. Leroy Smith, realized that the patient matched a picture and description of tattoos published in a local newspaper. Dr. Smith continued to stitch Speck's wounds while a nurse called police.
- British Prime Minister Harold Wilson flew to Moscow to try to persuade the Soviets to start peace negotiations between the U.S. and North Vietnam about the Vietnam War. Despite a warm welcome from Soviet Premier Alexei Kosygin, Wilson was told simply that his peace bid was doomed to fail. Wilson arrived only two hours after the departure of India's Prime Minister Indira Gandhi, who had been on a similar peace initiative.
- Jack Brabham won the 1966 British Grand Prix at Brands Hatch, with Denny Hulme in second place.

== July 17, 1966 (Sunday) ==
- Lamar Hunt, the owner of the Kansas City Chiefs professional football team, first identified the upcoming AFL–NFL World Championship Game with the nickname that would eventually become its official designation. "I think one of the first things we'll consider," Hunt told a reporter for the Kansas City Star, "is the site of the Super Bowl— that's my term for the championship game between the two leagues."
- Running one mile in 3 minutes, 51.3 seconds, Jim Ryun, a 19-year-old freshman at the University of Kansas, set a new world record, clipping more than two seconds off of the mark set by Michel Jazy on June 9, 1965. Ryun, competing at a track meet in Berkeley, California, became the first American to hold the record since 1934 when Glenn Cunningham, also a Kansas alumnus, had run it in 4:06.8.
- As the Vietnam War escalated, North Vietnam's President Ho Chi Minh ordered a partial mobilization of the North Vietnamese Army to "extend all-out support" to the Viet Cong forces that were fighting in South Vietnam.
- The passenger boat Bridlington Queen sprang a leak and sank at Bridlington, Yorkshire, UK. All 120 on board were rescued by various pleasure craft. The boat would later be refloated, repaired and returned to service.
- Born: El Mencho (alias for Nemesio Oseguera Cervantes), Mexican drug lord and leader of the Jalisco New Generation Cartel (CJNG); in Aguililla, Michoacán (d. 2026)
- Died: Edward Ulreich, 82, Hungarian-born American mural artist

== July 18, 1966 (Monday) ==
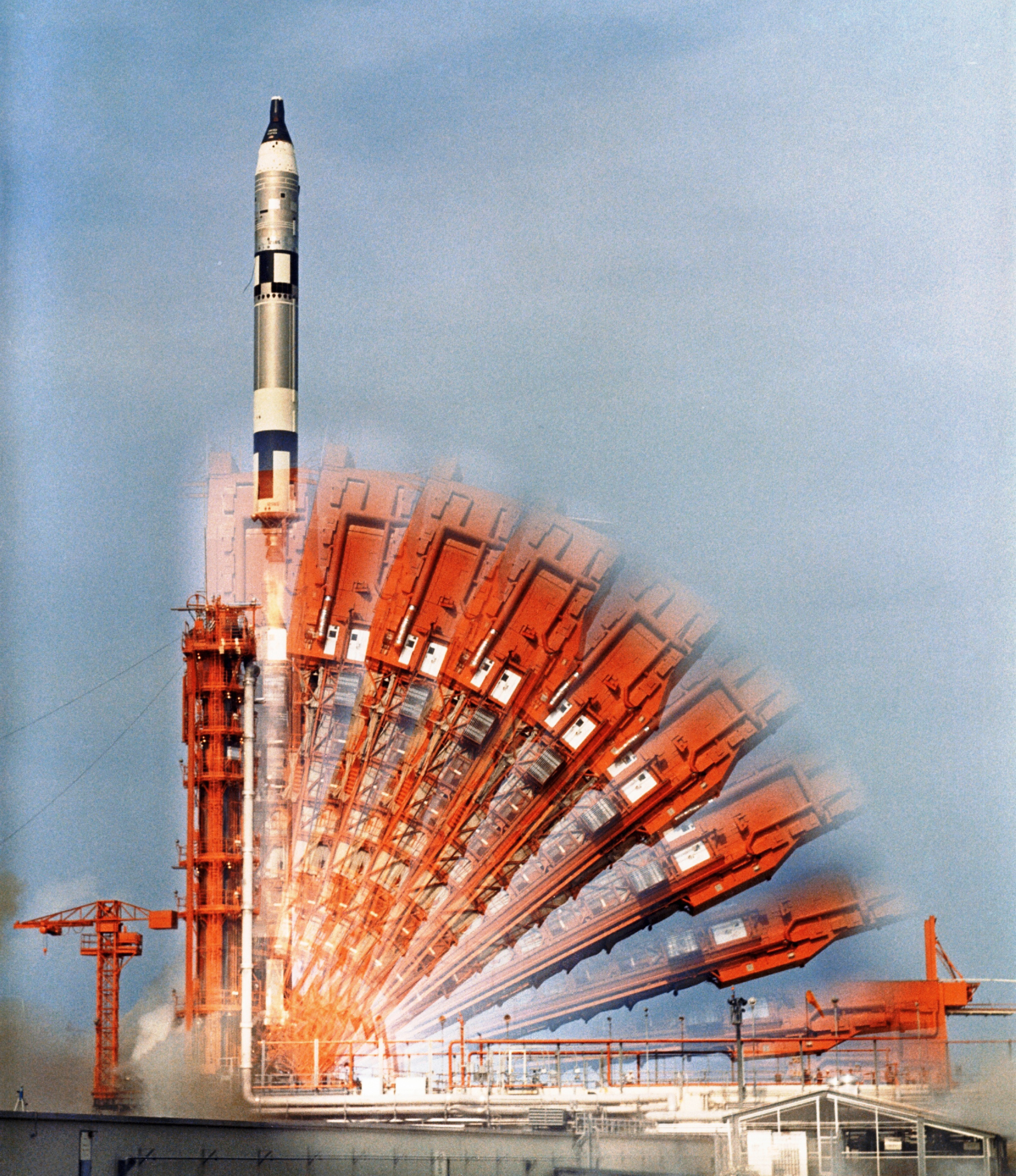
July 18, 1966: Time-lapse photograph of Gemini 10 launch

- The Gemini 10 mission, with astronauts John W. Young and Michael Collins, was launched from complex 19 at Cape Kennedy at 5:20 p.m. Less than two hours later, the Gemini Atlas-Agena target vehicle from complex 14 at 3:40 p.m. local time. Young and Collins rendezvoused with the target vehicle 5 hours 23 minutes after launch and docked with it about 30 minutes later. The astronauts would later boost the linked craft into a higher orbit, reaching an unprecedented altitude of 474 miles (763 km) above the Earth. The previous mark had been 308 miles (496 km), set by Soviet cosmonauts.
- The International Court of Justice, commonly called the "World Court", delivered what would later be described as "the most controversial judgment in its history", concluding litigation that had started more than five years earlier, on November 4, 1960. Liberia and Ethiopia had filed suit to have the United Nations revoke South Africa's administration of South West Africa under UN Mandate, based on South Africa's apartheid policy of denying rights to black African residents. Seven members had voted to grant the petition to end the South African Mandate; seven, including the World Court President, Sir Percy Spender of Australia, had concluded that the case should be dismissed because Liberia and Ethiopia lacked legal standing to pursue the matter. Spender then exercised his power to cast a second vote to break the 7–7 tie, and dismissed the case.
- George E. Mueller, NASA Associate Director for Manned Space Flight, assigned management of development of the S-IVB Orbital Workshop (the future Skylab) and SSESM to David M. Jones, the Saturn/Apollo Applications Program (S/AAP) Director. Development of experiments would still be processed through the Manned Space Flight Experiments Board.
- The Hough Riots broke out on the east side of Cleveland, Ohio, marking the city's first race riot. The triggering event had reportedly been an argument at a tavern, where patrons began complaining about a sign that ice water would not be provided for free during the heat wave. When police responded, the disorder spilled from the tavern and into the streets, and 300 of the Cleveland police moved in.
- Born: Dan O'Brien, American Olympic champion track and field athlete and holder of the world record in the decathlon from 1992 to 1999; in Portland, Oregon
- Died: Bobby Fuller, 23, American pop music singer and guitarist best known for his recording of "I Fought the Law", was found dead in his car outside his apartment in Los Angeles.

== July 19, 1966 (Tuesday) ==
- The first baseball game played entirely on artificial turf took place at the Houston Astrodome, as the Houston Astros defeated the Philadelphia Phillies, 8–2. During the first half of the season, only the infield was covered with the turf, and the new Astroturf outfield was installed during the All-Star break. Phillies manager Gene Mauch praised the turf, opining that "It's better because it's as good to play on and it looks prettier. So it's better."
- Canadian Navy Rear Admiral William Landymore was fired from his position as chief of Canada's Atlantic Defence Command, after publicly speaking out against the government's plan to unify the nation's Army, Navy and Air Force. All of the other admirals in the Canadian Navy had previously resigned rather than cooperate with the unification program.
- American astronaut Michael Collins performed a spacewalk outside the Gemini 10 capsule. Collins extended his torso outside the spacecraft to take photos before and after capsule sunrise. Color photography after sunrise was only partly completed because both Collins and Command Pilot Young were suffering from severe eye irritation from pungent fumes that came through the air supply. Handling the camera proved difficult because of the stiffness of Collins' gloves.
- Defending world champion Brazil was knocked out of World Cup competition by Portugal, 3–1, in Liverpool after its superstar player, Pelé, was injured 30 minutes into the match. With the prospect of a third consecutive Cup (after 1958 and 1962) ruined, thousands of fans cried, fights broke out, and "a shower of black carbon paper" was thrown from high rise buildings onto the streets of downtown Rio de Janeiro. In another game at Middlesbrough wrapping up group play, heavily favored Italy was upset by newcomer North Korea, on a goal by Pak Doo-ik. Other teams advancing to the quarter-finals were Uruguay, England, Argentina, West Germany, Hungary, and the Soviet Union.
- NASA's Manned Space Flight director George E. Mueller told NASA Deputy Administrator that MSFC recommended that the Apollo Telescope Mount be mounted within the Apollo Lunar Module (LM). Seamans ordered the heads of program offices at NASA Headquarters to conduct a 60-day study to update plans for a permanent crewed space station based on recent program changes, noting that there was "still a question whether a permanent space station is the best approach to achieving the envisioned mission objectives," and that a study would "help us to decide if such a course is desirable and when."

== July 20, 1966 (Wednesday) ==
- British Prime Minister Harold Wilson announced what would become known as "the July measures" in order to avoid the devaluation of the pound sterling, a crisis precipitated by a £350,000,000 deficit in the balance of payments, and made worse by the seamen's strike. The terms of what would be ratified as the Prices and Incomes Act meant the most stringent economic measures since World War II, with an additional 10% increase in income taxes, new surcharges on gasoline, and on beer, wine, and alcohol; higher sales taxes on most consumer goods; the raising of the minimum down payment on installment purchases from 25% to 40%; a decrease of the amount of the foreign travel spending allowance from $700 to $140 per person; a cutback of government spending; and a freeze on wage, price and dividend increases. Ultimately, the austerity program would fail, and on November 18, 1967, the pound would be devalued by 14 percent, from $2.80 USD to $2.40.
- Lieutenant (j.g.) Dieter Dengler, a U.S. Navy pilot, became the first American to successfully escape from a prisoner of war camp during the Vietnam War, when he was rescued following 23 days of making his way south. He and another pilot had sneaked out of the prison on June 27, but his companion (later identified as U.S. Air Force 1st Lieutenant Duane W. Martin) had been caught and beheaded. Dengler was near the 17th parallel that separated North Vietnam from the south, when he was spotted by a reconnaissance pilot, USAF Lt. Col. Eugene P. Deatrick, who would say later that the area was so densely covered with vegetation that the chance to see Dengler's white flag and SOS sign "was one in a million". Dengler was rescued by a helicopter and flown to an American hospital in Da Nang, and then sent to Travis Air Force Base in the United States.
- The Gemini 10 spacecraft undocked and separated from the Gemini 10 Agena target vehicle and used its own thrusters to rendezvous with the Gemini 8 Agena three hours later. A 39-minute spacewalk began, which included retrieving a micrometeorite collection package from the Gemini 8 Agena. After about three hours of orbital station-keeping, Gemini 10 separated from the GATV.
- Born: Enrique Peña Nieto, 64th President of Mexico from 2012 to 2018; in Atlacomulco
- Died: Julien Carette, 68, French film actor, died of burns suffered after he fell asleep while smoking in bed

== July 21, 1966 (Thursday) ==
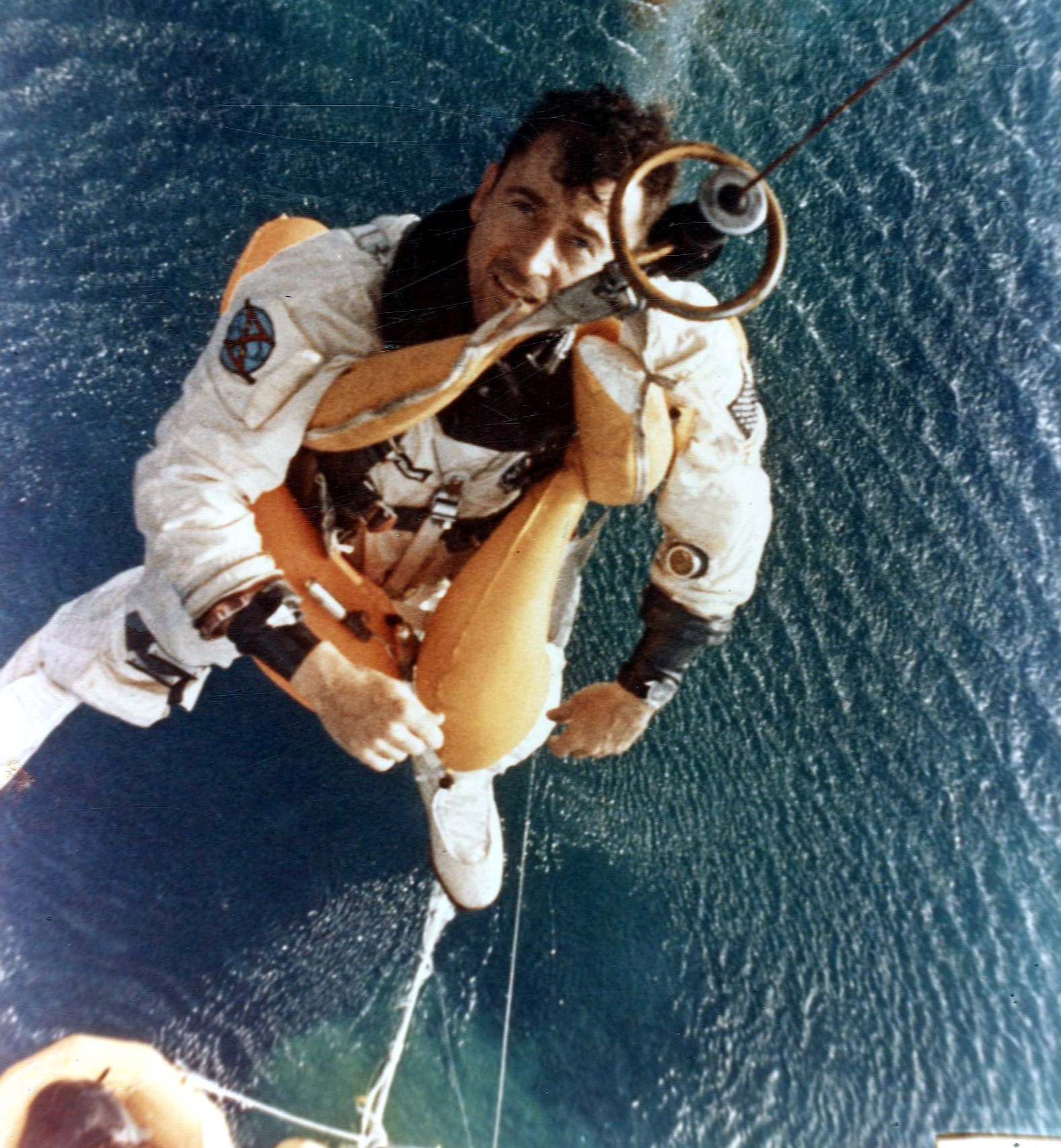
July 21, 1966: Astronaut Young hoisted into helicopter during Gemini 10 recovery

- The Gemini 10 spacecraft landed within sight of the prime recovery ship, the amphibious assault ship USS Guadalcanal (LPH-7), some 3 miles (4.8 km) from the planned landing point, at 4:07 p.m.
- In Geneva, Switzerland, the United States and the Soviet Union agreed to a treaty article that would ban any nation from claiming sovereignty over any portion of outer space, including the Moon and the planets. The wording stated: "Outer space, including the moon and other celestial bodies, is not subject to national appropriation by claim of sovereignty by means of use or occupation, or by any other means."
- Born: Sarah Waters, Welsh novelist; in Neyland, Pembrokeshire
- Died:
  - Philipp Frank, 82, American theoretical physicist, mathematician and philosopher who authored The Law of Causality and Its Limits
  - Francesco Paolo Cantelli, 90, Italian probability mathematician known for the Glivenko–Cantelli theorem

== July 22, 1966 (Friday) ==
- A million people gathered in Tiananmen Square in Beijing for a rally in support of defending North Vietnam, and to listen to speeches by Communist Party leaders. President Liu Shaoqi told the crowd, "We must warn the United States Aggressors in all seriousness— don't miscalculate, don't misjudge your opponents.... If you think you can unscrupulously 'escalate' the war of aggression without meeting due punishment, then you will find it too late to repent. The 700,000,000 Chinese people provide powerful backing for the Chinese people."
- In the wake of the dispute between the Netherlands and the People's Republic of China over the death of diplomat Hsu Tsu-tsai, the Chinese government declared the Netherlands' chargé d'affaires in Beijing, G. J. Jongejans, persona non grata and held him under house arrest, telling him not to leave the country before the Dutch government would permit a group of Chinese engineers to leave.
- The capsizing of the British cruise boat Prince of Wales killed 11 people, four of whom were children, after the vessel struck a toll bridge while traveling down the Mawddach River, at Penmaenpool with 38 passengers and crew. Another 15 children and 12 adults were rescued.
- George M. Low endorsed assignment of responsibility for the Apollo Telescope Mount to MSFC, but said that because of extremely complex technical and managerial interfaces, the benefits of total systems responsibility at MSFC would be lost if the ATM were mounted on an Apollo LM and that the job could not be done "in any reasonable length of time."

== July 23, 1966 (Saturday) ==
- The first prototype of the flexible bronchoscope, invented by Dr. Shigeto Ikeda of Japan, was delivered by the Machida Endoscope Company. Although surgeons had been able to view the inside of the respiratory airways for almost 70 years, the instrument itself was a rigid, straight metal tube. Dr. Ikeda's idea was to combine fiberoptic technology with a camera, which allowed views in narrower areas of the lungs. The Olympus Optical Company, manufacturer of cameras, would deliver its own version of flexible scope to Dr. Ikeda three weeks later, on August 13.
- Saddam Hussein, Deputy Secretary of Iraq's Ba'ath Party, escaped from prison after almost two years of incarceration, where he had been held on charges of conspiracy to assassinate President Abdul Rahman Arif. Saddam and a fellow prisoner were being transported to Baghdad for a trial; they slipped out of the back door of a restaurant where the party had stopped for lunch, and escaped in a waiting car. Two years later, Saddam would help lead a coup that overthrew President Arif and, in 1979, would become President of Iraq.
- The Baka Regiment of the Army of the Congo, made up of 2,000 soldiers from the Katanga Province and commanded by Colonel Ferdinand Tshipola, staged a mutiny in Kisangani (recently renamed from Stanleyville), and began fighting the national government in an attempt to regain independence for Katanga. The revolt would finally be suppressed on September 25, after more than 3,000 people had been killed.
- Died:
  - Enola Gay Tibbetts, 73, American homemaker whose name became associated with the atomic bombing of Hiroshima in 1945; Mrs. Tibbetts's son, Colonel Paul W. Tibbetts, named his B-29 bomber in his mother's honor, and was assigned to drop the first atomic weapon to be used in war.
  - Montgomery Clift, 45, American film actor known for From Here to Eternity; from a heart attack

== July 24, 1966 (Sunday) ==
- Michael Pelkey and Brian Schubert became the first people known to have parachuted from a steep cliff, diving off the 3,000-foot-high (910 m) El Capitan, a vertical rock formation in Yosemite National Park in California. With no precedent to guide them, and at the mercy of wind conditions, both men were injured. Schubert crashed hard into the talus at the base of the rock and would tell Pelkey later "that he had heard every bone in both feet break". Their feat, however, would later be an inspiration for the extreme sport of BASE jumping.
- A USAF F-4C Phantom #63-7599 was shot down by a North Vietnamese SAM-2 45 miles (72 km) northeast of Hanoi, in the first loss of a U.S. aircraft to a Vietnamese SAM in the Vietnam War. The pilot, Captain Richard P. Keirn, ejected successfully from his stricken aircraft and was captured. His bombardier/navigator Captain Roscoe H. Fobair failed to eject and was killed; his remains would be recovered in 2001.
- U.N. Secretary General U Thant visited Moscow, the third world leader (after Indira Gandhi of India and Harold Wilson of the Britain) in two weeks to try to persuade the Soviet Union to endorse a program for ending the Vietnam War.
- Greg Buckingham, a junior at Stanford University, of the United States set a new world record in the 200 metre individual medley swimming event, at a competition at Foothill College in Los Altos, California, swimming the distance in two minutes, 13.1 seconds, nearly two seconds faster than the 1964 record held by Dick Roth. Two days earlier, 14-year-old Lynn Vidali set a new women's world record at the same distance, at two minutes, 29 seconds, breaking the mark set by Donna de Varona in 1961.
- Died: Tony Lema, 32, American golfer, his wife, the pilot of their chartered plane (Doris Mullen), and Dr. George Bard, the co-pilot and co-owner of the plane, killed when the plane ran out of fuel and crashed in a water hazard short of the seventh green of Lansing Sportsman's Park in Lansing, Illinois. Lema had been returning home from Akron, Ohio, where he had finished competing in the PGA Championship.

== July 25, 1966 (Monday) ==
- A bus crash killed 33 people from Belgium, 27 of whom were children. The bus skidded off a bridge while driving on the autobahn outside of Idstein, West Germany, and fell 50 feet (15 m) to another highway below. All the passengers were on their way home to Brussels from a vacation in the Austrian Alps. The nine survivors were seriously injured.
- The British House of Commons voted, 328 to 147, to nationalize the nation's steel industry, bringing the 14 largest steel producers under the control of one national corporation. Nationalization had been repealed in 1951.
- The 163-year-old Thames barge Favourite, constructed in 1803 and one of the oldest floating vessels in the United Kingdom, sank at Chiswick, London, while sitting at its moorings on the River Thames.
- William A. Ferguson, MSFC Orbital Workshop Project Manager, made a presentation on the OWS as an experiment to the Manned Space Flight Experiments Board (MSFEB). Associate Administrator George E. Mueller approved the experiment for flight on AS-209.
- Died: Frank O'Hara, 40, American poet, critic and curator of the Museum of Modern Art, died of injuries incurred the previous day when he was run over by a dune buggy while sleeping on the Fire Island beach.

== July 26, 1966 (Tuesday) ==
- Baron Gerald Gardiner, the Lord High Chancellor of Great Britain and the head of the judiciary of England and Wales, issued the Practice Statement in the British House of Lords, stating that the House was not bound to follow its own previous precedent. In addition to its legislative function, the House of Lords also served as a court of last resort for appeals of the decisions of lower courts on matters of interpretation of British law, with such matters decided by its Appellate Committee, drawn from those members who qualified as Lords of Appeal in Ordinary. That function would be superseded in 2009 by the creation of the Supreme Court of the United Kingdom. Lord Gardiner articulated the conclusion that he and other members had reached, that the London Tramways decision regarding stare decisis, which had restricted the Court from departing from prior rulings since 1898, would no longer bind the Lords. Gardiner reiterated the importance of precedent "as an indispensable foundation upon which to decide what is law and its application to individual cases," but added, "Their Lordships nevertheless recognise that too rigid adherence to precedent may lead to injustice in a particular case and also unduly restrict the proper development of the law. They propose therefore to modify their present practice and, while treating former decisions of this House as normally binding, to depart from a decision when it appears right to do so."
- While on vacation in Italy, film star William Holden accidentally killed a man when he was driving at over 100 miles per hour (160 km/h) in his Ferrari 3000 car from Florence to Pisa. While attempting to pass, Holden's auto struck a Fiat 500 being driven by 42-year-old salesman Valerio Novelli. Holden, who would pay Novelli's widow $80,000 to settle a civil suit, would be convicted in absentia of manslaughter by a court in Lucca and receive a suspended eight-month jail sentence.
- After refusing to resign from his position as Prime Minister of Sudan, Muhammad Ahmad Mahgoub was forced to step down following a vote of censure by the Constituent Assembly. Mahgoub had become so unpopular that the vote was 126 to 30 in favor of the condemnation. The next day, Sadiq al-Mahdi was named the new Prime Minister after the Assembly was given a choice between him and Mahgoub, and al-Mahdi won by a margin of 138 to 29.
- NASA Deputy Administrator Robert C. Seamans, Jr., formally notified other Administrators that he had assigned full responsibility for Apollo and AAP missions to the Office of Manned Space Flight.

== July 27, 1966 (Wednesday) ==
- For the first time in 58 years, liquor was legally served in Mississippi, the last of the United States to have repealed its prohibition laws. Effective July 1, individual local governments were allowed to hold referendum elections on whether to allow the sale of liquor at state-approved resorts, and Harrison County voters had endorsed the measure. At 6:55 p.m., after police cars escorted a liquor delivery truck into Biloxi. The first drink in the state was poured at the Broadwater Beach Hotel, and Louis Cobb, the first legal bartender in Mississippi, sold a glass of scotch whiskey to hotel manager T.M. Dorsett. Biloxi Mayor Dan Guice then cut the ribbon to open the entrance to the hotel's bar.
- Following the announcement of his austerity programme, British Prime Minister Harold Wilson survived a vote of censure in the House of Commons, as members of his Labour Party (with an 88-seat majority) supported him. The final result was 246 votes in favor, and 325 against. On the same day, the nation's chief labor union, the Trades Union Congress, voted 20 to 12 in support of a resolution pledging to halt strikes that had been threatened during the six-month freeze against raising wages.
- Died: Brenda Sue Brown, 11, was beaten to death after walking with her sister to summer school in Shelby, North Carolina. Police were unable to charge a suspect with the crime, until more than 40 years later, when a series of articles in the Shelby Star led a woman to reveal that her grandfather had made a deathbed confession of assisting Thurman Price in the kidnapping. Price, by then 77 years old, would be arrested on February 12, 2007, but would post bond four days later and die at the age of 83 while awaiting trial.

== July 28, 1966 (Thursday) ==
- An American U-2 reconnaissance plane, piloted by U.S. Army Captain Robert D. Hickman, had disappeared over Cuba. Hickman's remains, and his airplane, were discovered two days later on a hillside near Oruro, Bolivia. The craft had flown on automatic pilot until its fuel supply was exhausted, and it was presumed that depressurization had caused Captain Hickman to lose consciousness.
- In the UK, the University of Surrey and Fitzwilliam College, Cambridge, received their royal charters.
- Born: Miguel Ángel Nadal, Spanish footballer who represented Spain in three World Cups; in Manacor

== July 29, 1966 (Friday) ==
- While on a visit to the city of Ibadan, General Johnson Aguiyi-Ironsi, the President of Nigeria, was taken hostage while staying at the Government House, the official residence of Western Region Military Governor Adekunle Fajuyi. Mutineers led by Army Captain Theophilus Danjuma then took President Aguiyi-Ironsi and Governor Fajuyi to a nearby forest and executed both of them. Brigadier General Babafemi Ogundipe, the Chief of Staff of the Armed Forces, operated the government until a new President could be named.
- Bob Dylan was injured in a motorcycle accident near his home in Woodstock, New York. He would not be seen in public again for over a year. "For the best part of twelve months," a biographer would note later, "very few people knew what Dylan was doing, whether he was permanently crippled or if he would ever record again."
- Born: Richard Steven Horvitz, American actor and comedian, best known for his voice work in animated shows and video games; in Los Angeles
- Died: Edward Gordon Craig, 94, English modernist theatre practitioner and illegitimate son of Ellen Terry

== July 30, 1966 (Saturday) ==
- England defeated West Germany, 4–2, to win the 1966 FIFA World Cup in front of 97,000 spectators at Wembley after extra time. In the 89th minute of the 90-minute regulation time, Wolfgang Weber tied the score, 2–2, after rebounding Roger Hunt's block of a free kick. In the 30 minutes of extra time, Geoff Hurst scored both goals in the extra 30-minute period. The go-ahead point came in the 101st minute on a shot that actually bounced off of the bar of the goal; after a conference with a linesman, the referee ruled that a goal had been scored. The other extra time goal by Hurst came on the final kick of the match.
- The CIA's Tagboard Project, testing of the Lockheed D-21 drone, came to an end with the destruction of an A-12 reconnaissance aircraft and the death of a pilot. The unmanned drone was designed to be launched while the mother ship was flying at supersonic speed. After separation from the A-12, the D-21 failed to start, and the two machines collided. Test pilot Bill Park and launch control officer Ray Torick ejected from the aircraft while flying over the Pacific Ocean; Park was rescued after an hour in the ocean, but Torick drowned when his pressure suit took on water.
- Ludwig Tande, the mayor of the small town of Plentywood, Montana, was assassinated in the city's courtroom by Duane Falk, an oil worker who had just been convicted of an assault charge and was upset over being fined fifty dollars.
- The United States began its first bombing of the 6-mile (9.7 km) wide Demilitarized Zone (DMZ) intended as a buffer between North Vietnam and South Vietnam.

== July 31, 1966 (Sunday) ==
- All 31 people on the British pleasure cruiser MV Darlwyne died when the ship sank off the coast of Cornwall, after departing from Fowey on a return trip to Falmouth, where the cruise had started. After the ship failed to return as scheduled at 7:00 p.m., a search by air began 11 hours later the next morning and was unable to find any sign of it other than a dinghy. Bodies were not located until four days after the ship vanished in bad weather. Only 12 bodies were ever recovered, and five had wristwatches that had stopped at times ranging from 8:05 to 9:49 in the evening; an inquiry by the Board of Trade would conclude that the Darlwyne had been unfit to sail in the open waters and would blame its skipper for taking it out to sea anyway.
- Two days after it appeared that the direct intervention of U.S. President Johnson had settled the airline mechanics strike that had grounded five major carriers, the members of the International Association of Machinists overwhelmingly rejected the settlement package, with 6,587 in favor of ratifying it, but 17,251 against it.
- Born:
  - Dean Cain, American television actor (Lois & Clark: The New Adventures of Superman); as Dean Tanaka in Mount Clemens, Michigan
  - Marina Ogilvy, daughter of British Princess Alexandra; in Richmond Park, London
- Died:
  - Alexander von Falkenhausen, 87, Military Governor of German-occupied Belgium during World War II
  - Bud Powell, 41, American jazz pianist
