= Röthlisberger =

Röthlisberger is a surname. Notable people with the surname include:

- Hans Röthlisberger (1923–2009), Swiss glaciologist
- Jürg Röthlisberger (born 1955), Swiss judoka
- Kurt Röthlisberger (born 1951), Swiss football referee
- Ursula Röthlisberger (born 1964), Swiss scientist
- Nadia Röthlisberger-Raspe (1972–2015), Swiss curler

== See also ==
- Roethlisberger (surname)
