= Mount Asgard =

Mountain in Nunavut, Canada

- Sivanitirutinguak
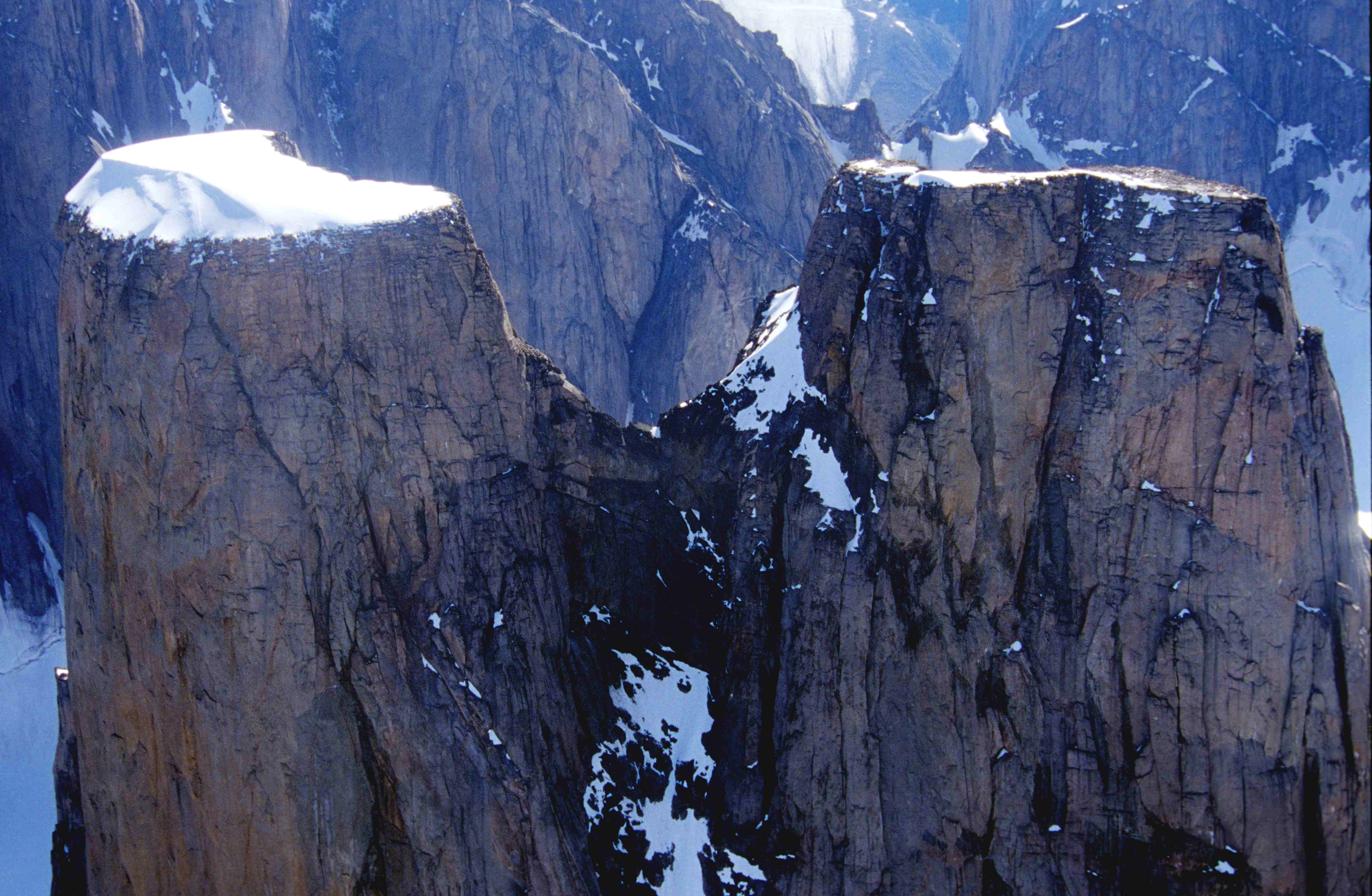
- Mount Asgard in July 2001

Highest point
- Elevation: 2,015 m (6,611 ft)
- Coordinates: 66°40′20″N 65°16′28″W

Geography
- Location within Nunavut
- Interactive map of Mount Asgard
- Location: Nunavut, Canada
- Parent range: Baffin Mountains
- Topo map: NTS 26I11 Mount Asgard

Geology
- Mountain type: granite

Climbing
- First ascent: 1953 by J. Weber, J. Marmet, H. Röthlisberger
- Easiest route: technical rock climb (Grade IV, YDS 5.8/5.9, A1)

Mount Asgard (Inuktitut: ᓯᕙᓂᑎᕈᑎᖑᐊᒃ, Sivanitirutinguak) is a twin peaked mountain with two flat-topped, cylindrical, rock towers, separated by a saddle. It is located in Auyuittuq National Park, on the Cumberland Peninsula of Baffin Island, Nunavut, Canada. The peak is named after Asgard, the realm of the Æsir (gods) in Norse mythology.

== Climbing history ==
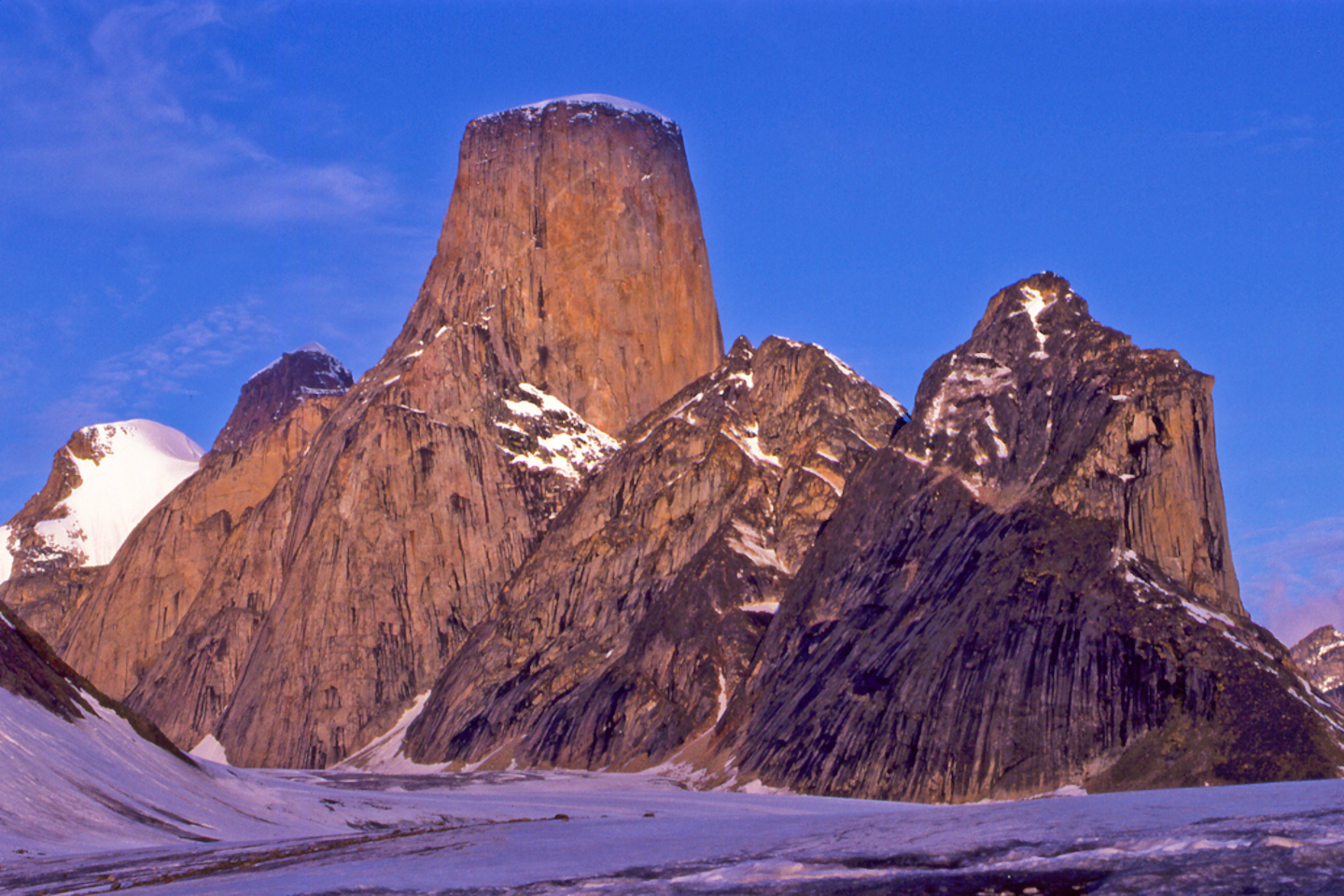
Mount Asgard from the Turner Glacier

Asgard's slightly higher North Peak was first ascended in 1953 by J. Weber, J. Marmet, and Hans Röthlisberger, Swiss scientists on the Baffin Island Expedition of the Arctic Institute of North America, led by the Canadian, P. Baird. Their route ascended the east side of the north peak, using a climbing traverse across snowfields and rock ribs, to reach the saddle between the two peaks, and thence to the top of the North Peak. The route is graded VI, 5.8/5.9 A1. It is still the most-travelled route and is the standard descent route for climbers making more difficult ascents on other faces.

The South Peak was first climbed in 1971 by G. Lee, R. Wood, P. Clanky, J. Pavur, Y. Kamisawa and P. Koch. Since then, at least 13 routes have been put up on the two peaks, most involving highly technical free and aid climbing, with lengths varying from 800 to 1,200 m (2,600 to 3,900 ft). One of the most notable routes was put up in 1975 by Charlie Porter as a solo climb. This was "the first Baffin modern, multi-day, technical, big-wall climb", with 40 pitches rated at Grade VII, 5.10, A4 and it was followed by "a 10-day walk-out to the fjord-head without food". The fact that this was all done solo was "a remarkable achievement".

In 2009, climbers and BASE jumpers Leo Houlding, Sean Leary and Carlos Quiroga Suarez participated in the Asgard Project, an attempt to make the first free ascent on the north tower of Mount Asgard. The film of their successful climb and descent called The Asgard Project, was critically acclaimed, winning 22 international film festival awards. After the film's release, Parks Canada charged all three climbers for trespassing and illegally BASE jumping within Auyuittuq National Park. The charges were later dropped after the climbers paid donations to an environmental charity and made a public apology for their climb.

== In film ==
In 1976, Rick Sylvester, a stuntman and climber, performed a BASE jump, skiing off the mountain with a Union Jack parachute for the pre-title sequence of the James Bond film The Spy Who Loved Me although the setting was the Alps. The stunt team and film crew had reached the summit by helicopter.

== Gallery ==
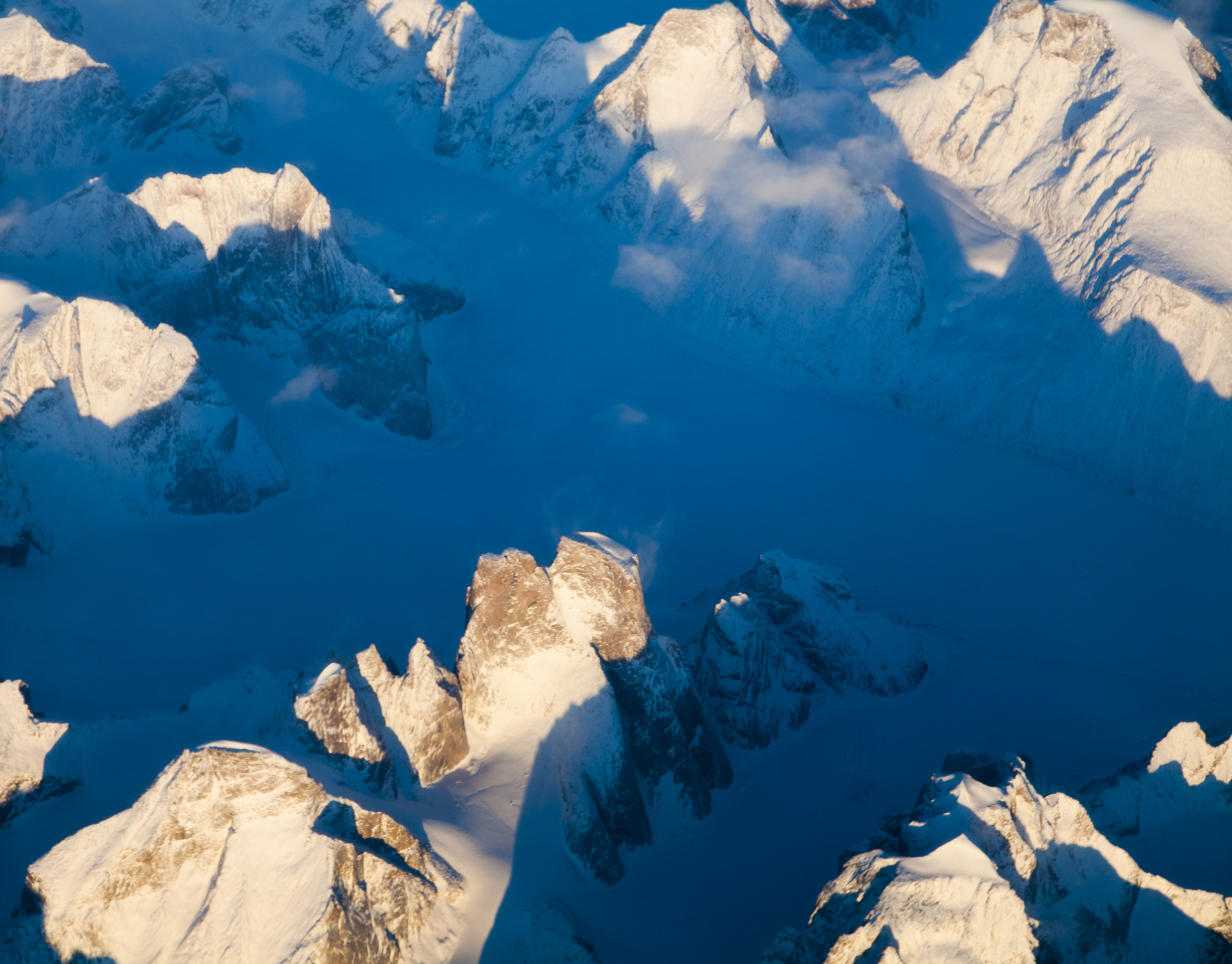
Mount Asgard aerial view

== See also ==
- List of mountains of Canada
