= Rick Sylvester =

American stunt man (born 1942)

- Born: April 3, 1942 (age 83)
- Occupations: Climber, Stuntman
- Known for: BASE jumping

Rick Sylvester (born April 3, 1942) is an American climber and former stuntman, most famous for his BASE jumping using skis and a Union Jack parachute from Mount Asgard in Canada for the James Bond movie The Spy Who Loved Me in July 1976.

In 1971, he skied off the top of El Capitan in California and descended approximately 914 metres (3000 feet) by parachute. This was conceived as "the world's greatest ski jump". There were two more jumps made in secrecy to avoid arrest by the National Park Service; Sylvester wanted more footage shot from different angles. These jumps were made in 1972 and 1973. Already an expert skier, he spent three weeks learning sky diving to make this jump. Sylvester also worked in another Bond film, For Your Eyes Only, where he did the stunt when Bond falls off the side of a mountain he is climbing in Meteora, Greece.

In 1978, Sylvester, along with famed mountaineer Jim Bridwell, helped rescue approximately 40 people trapped in a ski tram in blizzard conditions. A 17-ton cable that supported the tram had come free and sliced through the tram car, killing several tourists. Sylvester, Bridwell, and others set up a pulley system on-the-fly to free the survivors and lower them to safety.
