= Karina Hollekim =

Norwegian freestyle skier

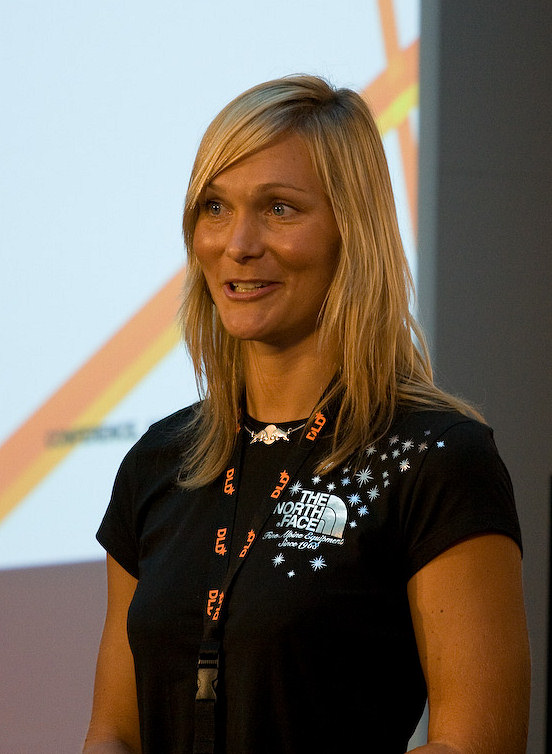
Karina Hollekim in 2008

Karina Hollekim (born April 25, 1976) is a Norwegian free skier and BASE jumper. She is the first female athlete to complete a ski BASE.

In August 2006 she had a near-fatal crash after her parachute failed during a routine parachuting jump. She hit the ground at over 100 km/h (60 mph), and her legs were fractured in 21 places. Although doctors said she would never walk again, after 20 surgeries she has recovered and was back skiing in 2007.

Her biographical movie 20 Seconds of Joy won both the Best film on Mountainsports as well as the People's choice awards at the 2007 Banff Mountain Film Festival.

In November 2011 Hollekim published her autobiography (co-authored with Odd Harald Hauge), The Wonderful Feeling of Fear (Den vidunderlige: følelsen av frykt) with Gyldendal Publishing.
