= Roethlisberger (surname) =

Roethlisberger is a surname. Notable people with the name include:

- Ben Roethlisberger (born 1982), American football player
- Fritz Roethlisberger (1898–1974), American social scientist
- John Roethlisberger (born 1970), American gymnast
- Marcel Roethlisberger (born 1929), Swiss art historian
- Marie Roethlisberger (born 1966), American gymnast
- Rudy W. Roethlisberger (1894–1957), American politician

== See also ==
- Röthlisberger, surname
