= Death of Hsu Tsu-tsai =

Coordinates: 52°5′32.7″N 4°17′11.4″E

The death of Hsu Tsu-tsai, a 42-year-old Chinese engineer, in July 1966 in The Hague, Netherlands caused a diplomatic incident between the Netherlands and China. The mysterious circumstances surrounding Hsu's injuries and death, apparently resulting from his attempted defection, resulted in a twenty-four-week siege of the Chinese legation as Dutch authorities sought to question his colleagues and consular officials, and the suspension of diplomatic relations between the Netherlands and China.

== Injury and death of Hsu Tsu-tsai ==
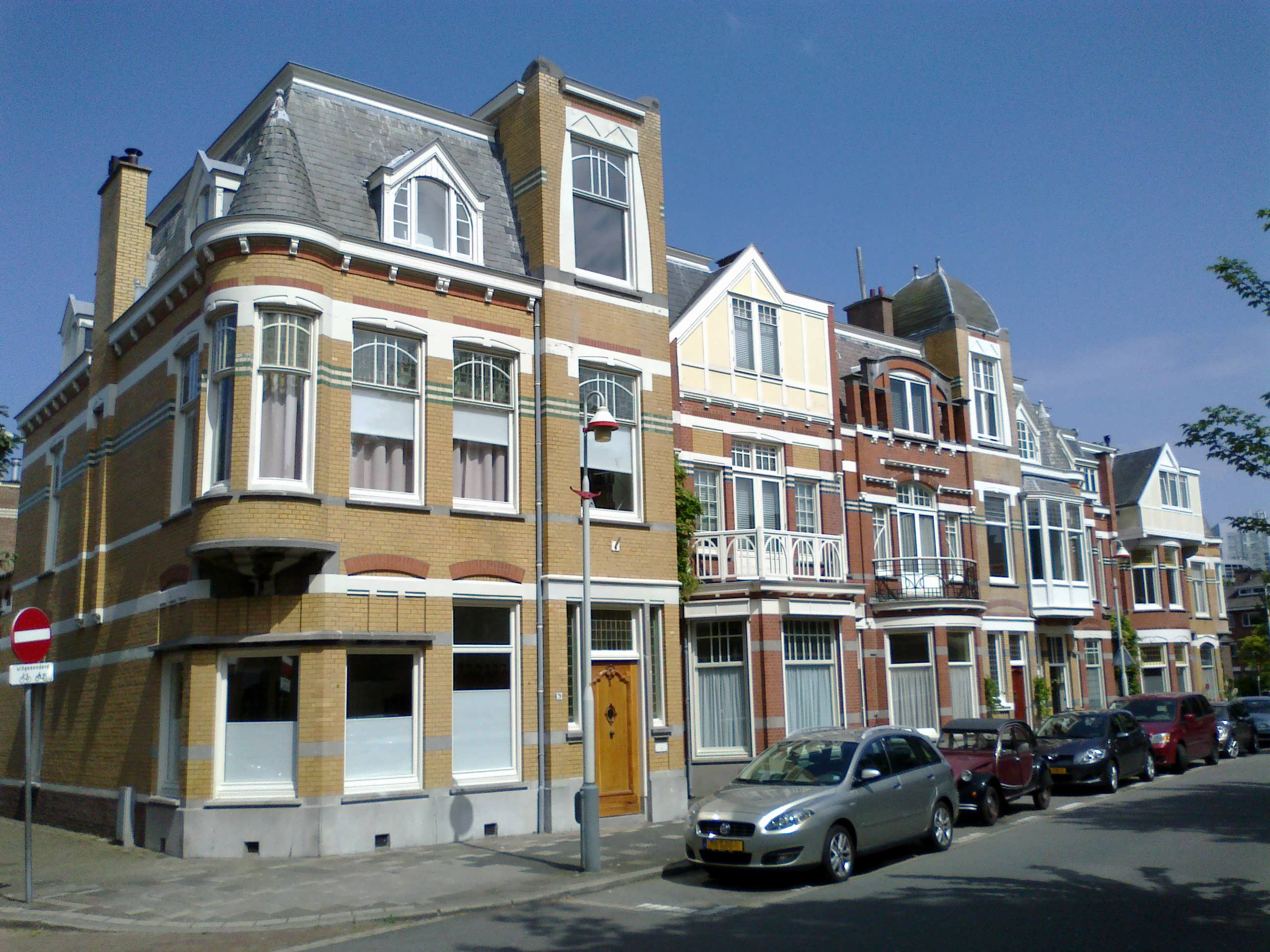
2014 photograph of Prins Mauritslaan, the street on which Hsu Tsu-tsai was found injured. The house in which Hsu was staying is at the far right – number 17 on the corner with Van Hoornbeekstraat.

Hsu was in the Netherlands with eight colleagues to attend the International Welders Conference in Delft. On 16 July 1966, Hsu was seen by a witness lying critically injured on the doorstep outside number 17, Prins Mauritslaan, the rented house of the third secretary of the Chinese legation, where the engineers were staying. The witness, businessman S. P. van der Veer, parked his car to offer assistance, but found that Hsu had been moved inside the house. When there was no response to his door knocks, Van der Veer went next door to number 19, where a neighbour let him in to call the police.

The police arrived to find Hsu screaming in the lobby of the house, and despite the objections of the Chinese officials present, they took him to the Red Cross Hospital, where doctors began treatment for spinal and internal injuries. Whilst in the hospital's X-ray department, three Chinese men entered the room, placed Hsu on a stretcher and carried him to a car bearing diplomatic plates. The car drove to the Chinese legation at Adriaan Goekooplaan 7, The Hague, located in the mansion of the charge d'affaires Li En-chiu, where Hsu later died on the Sunday afternoon. Hsu's body was seized by Dutch police for post-mortem examination, when they intercepted a hearse carrying the body from the legation to a crematorium.

== Diplomatic response ==
Dutch police sought to question Hsu's eight colleagues regarding his death, however the Chinese legation refused to allow this.

On 19 July, the Dutch government ordered the expulsion of the Chinese charge d'affaires, Li En-chiu. China responded by declaring Gerrit Jan Jongejans, the Dutch envoy in Peking, persona non grata, although he was prevented from leaving the country until the eight engineers were released.

In December, it was announced that a 10-foot (3 metre) fence would be constructed around the grounds of the legation to prevent the engineers from leaving covertly. On 30 December, five-and-a-half months after the incident, the Chinese relented to police questioning the engineers, on the condition that they be immediately allowed to return to China. The Dutch prosecutors decided that Hsu's colleagues were not complicit in his death, and they were permitted to leave the Netherlands. The Chinese officials who had abducted Hsu from the hospital could not be prosecuted due to diplomatic immunity.

== Accounts of the incident ==
There are several contradictory accounts of Hsu's death and the events leading up to it, however each account contains some element of espionage and defection.

The Chinese government accused the Dutch government of responsibility for Hsu's death. The Chinese foreign affairs department released a statement saying that Hsu had jumped from the building in an attempt to escape from agents of the United States Central Intelligence Agency who were trying to convince him to defect with the support of Dutch intelligence.

On 10 September 1966, a correspondent for The Observer newspaper—citing Dutch official sources—stated that it was believed Hsu had been run over by a car after a formula for liquid rocket fuel was found on him, and that he had been left lying outside the legation to suggest he had tried to commit suicide by jumping out of the window. The Observer also said it was almost certain that Hsu had given a sample of rocket fuel to American intelligence agents, and was seeking to defect to the West. The Dutch public broadcaster, NPO, reported that the Domestic Security Service (Binnenlandse Veiligheidsdienst – BVD) had also conducted an investigation, which outlined the agency's suspicions that Hsu was a potential defector who had been approached by the CIA.

In 1974, the historian Donald McCormick (writing as Richard Deacon) devoted a chapter of his book, A History of the Chinese Secret Service, to the Hsu incident in which he suggests that the CIA had offered Hsu "a million dollars" to defect to the U.S. Embassy with a parcel containing a sample of "poison gas". A declassified review of McCormick's book by Stanley Bergman for the CIA newsletter called the author's account an "imaginative concoction" and "fiction fantasy". Bergman cites Liao Ho-shu (second secretary at the Chinese legation who later defected to the United States), who stated that Hsu had intended to defect and fell when he attempted to climb from the window using bedsheets tied together. Bergman also denies that the CIA had approached Hsu to defect, and that CIA-affiliated scientists who had spoken with Hsu at the conference had reported no indications that he intended to seek asylum.

The Dutch espionage documentary series James Bond in Den Haag (English: James Bond in The Hague) covered the "Chinese Affair" in episode 4 of the series on 20 February 2013.
