= BASE jumping =

Activity of jumping from fixed objects using a parachute

BASE jump in Oman, 2013

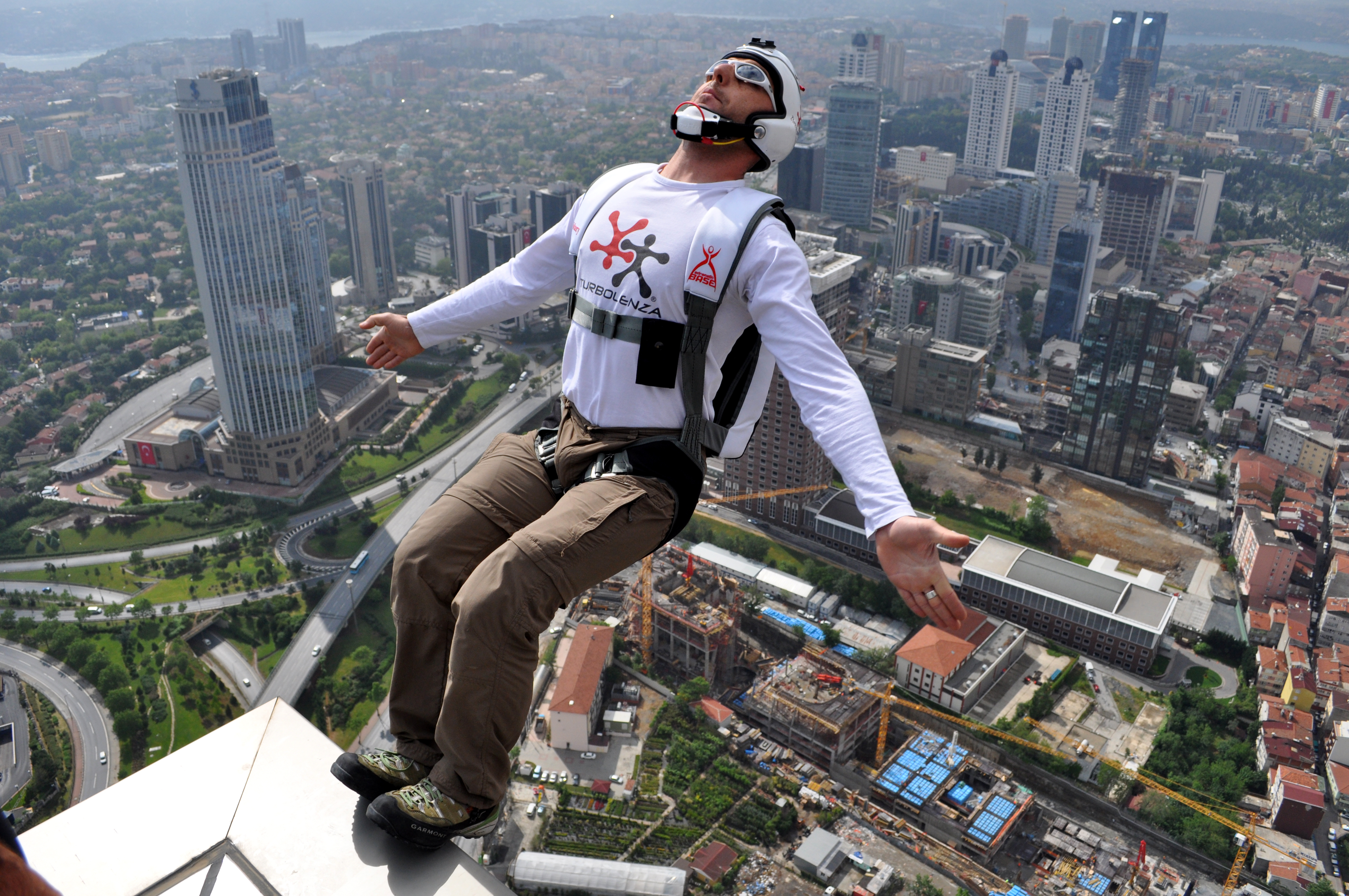
BASE jumping from Sapphire Tower, Istanbul

BASE jumping (/beɪs/) is the activity of jumping from fixed objects, using a parachute to descend to the ground. BASE is an acronym that stands for four categories of fixed objects from which one can jump: buildings, antennas (referring to radio masts), spans (bridges) and earth (cliffs). Participants jump from a fixed object such as a cliff and, after an optional freefall delay, deploy a parachute to slow their descent and land. A popular form of BASE jumping is wingsuit BASE jumping.

In contrast to other forms of parachuting, such as skydiving from airplanes, BASE jumps are performed from fixed objects that are generally at much lower altitudes, and BASE jumpers only carry one parachute. BASE jumping is significantly more hazardous than other forms of parachuting and is widely considered to be one of the most dangerous extreme sports.

== History ==
=== Precursors ===
Fausto Veranzio is widely believed to have been the first person to build and test a parachute, by jumping from St Mark's Campanile in Venice in 1617 when he was more than 65 years old. However these and other sporadic incidents were one-time experiments, not a systematic pursuit of a new form of parachuting.

=== Birth of BASE jumping ===
Precursors to the activity date back hundreds of years. In 1966 Michael Pelkey and Brian Schubert jumped from El Capitan in Yosemite National Park. The acronym B.A.S.E. (now more commonly BASE) was later coined by filmmaker Carl Boenish, his wife Jean Boenish, Phil Smith, and Phil Mayfield. Carl Boenish was an important catalyst behind modern BASE jumping and in 1978 he filmed jumps from El Capitan made using ram-air parachutes and the freefall tracking technique. While BASE jumps had been made prior to that time, the El Capitan activity was the effective birth of what is now called BASE jumping.

After 1978 the filmed jumps from El Capitan were repeated, not as an actual publicity exercise or as a movie stunt but as a true recreational activity. It was this that popularized BASE jumping more widely among parachutists. Carl Boenish continued to publish films and informational magazines on BASE jumping until his death in 1984 after a BASE jump off the Troll Wall. By this time the concept had spread among skydivers worldwide, with hundreds of participants making fixed-object jumps.

During the early eighties, nearly all BASE jumps were made using standard skydiving equipment, including two parachutes (main and reserve), and deployment components. Later on, specialized equipment and techniques were developed specifically for the unique needs of BASE jumping.

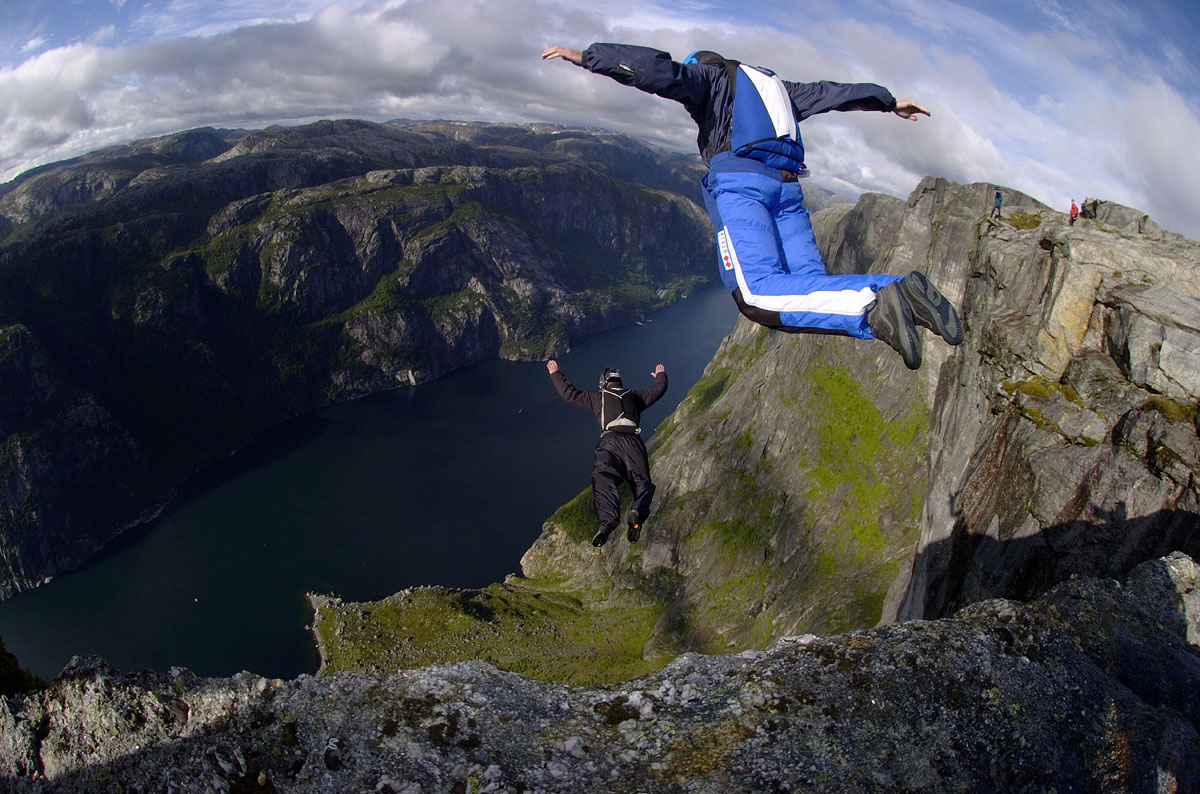
Jumpers from a cliff wearing tracking suits

In recent years, recognizing the activity's growing appeal and the potential for high-impact marketing, companies such as Red Bull have stepped in to sponsor athletes, further elevating the activity's profile.

=== BASE numbers ===
Upon completing a jump from all of the four object categories, a jumper may choose to apply for a "BASE number", awarded sequentially by Rick and Joy Harrison.

== Equipment ==
In the early days of BASE jumping, people used modified skydiving gear, such as by removing the deployment bag and slider, stowing the lines in a tail pocket, and fitting a large pilot chute. However, modified skydiving gear is prone to kinds of malfunction that are rare in normal skydiving (such as "line-overs" and broken lines). Modern purpose-built BASE jumping equipment is considered to be much safer and more reliable.

=== Parachute ===
The biggest difference in gear is that skydivers jump with both a main and a reserve parachute, while BASE jumpers carry only one parachute. BASE jumping parachutes are larger than skydiving parachutes and are typically flown with a wing loading of around 3.4 kg/m^{2} (0.7 lb/sq ft). Vents are one element that make a parachute suitable for BASE jumping. BASE jumpers often use extra large pilot chutes to compensate for lower airspeed parachute deployments. On jumps from lower altitudes, the slider is removed for faster parachute opening.

=== Harness and container ===
BASE jumpers use a single-parachute harness and container system. Since there is only a single parachute, BASE jumping containers are mechanically much simpler than skydiving containers. This simplicity contributes to the safety and reliability of BASE jumping gear by eliminating many malfunctions that can occur with more complicated skydiving equipment. Since there is no reserve parachute, there is little need to cut-away their parachute, and many BASE harnesses do not contain a 3-ring release system. A modern ultralight BASE system including parachute, container, and harness can weigh as little as 3.9 kilograms (8.6 lb).

=== Clothing ===
When jumping from high mountains, BASE jumpers will often use special clothing to improve control and flight characteristics in the air. Wingsuit flying has become a popular form of BASE jumping in recent years, allowing jumpers to glide over long horizontal distances. Tracking suits inflate like wingsuits to give additional lift to jumpers, but maintain separation of arms and legs to allow for greater mobility and safety.

== Technique ==
BASE jumps can be broadly classified into low jumps and high jumps. The primary distinguishing characteristic of low BASE jumps versus high BASE jumps is the use of a slider reefing device to control the opening speed of the parachute, and whether the jumper falls long enough to reach terminal velocity.

=== Low BASE jumps ===
Low BASE jumps are those where the jumper does not reach terminal velocity. Sometimes referred to as "slider down" jumps because they are typically performed without a slider reefing device on the parachute. The lack of a slider enables the parachute to open more quickly. Other techniques for low BASE jumps include the use of a static line, direct bag, or P.C.A. (pilot chute assist). These devices form an attachment between the parachute and the jump platform, which stretches out the parachute and suspension lines as the jumper falls, before separating and allowing the parachute to inflate. This enables the very lowest jumps—below 60 metres (200 ft) to be made. BASE jumpers have been known to jump from objects as low as 30 metres (100 ft), which leaves little to no canopy time and requires an immediate flare to land safely.

=== High BASE jumps ===
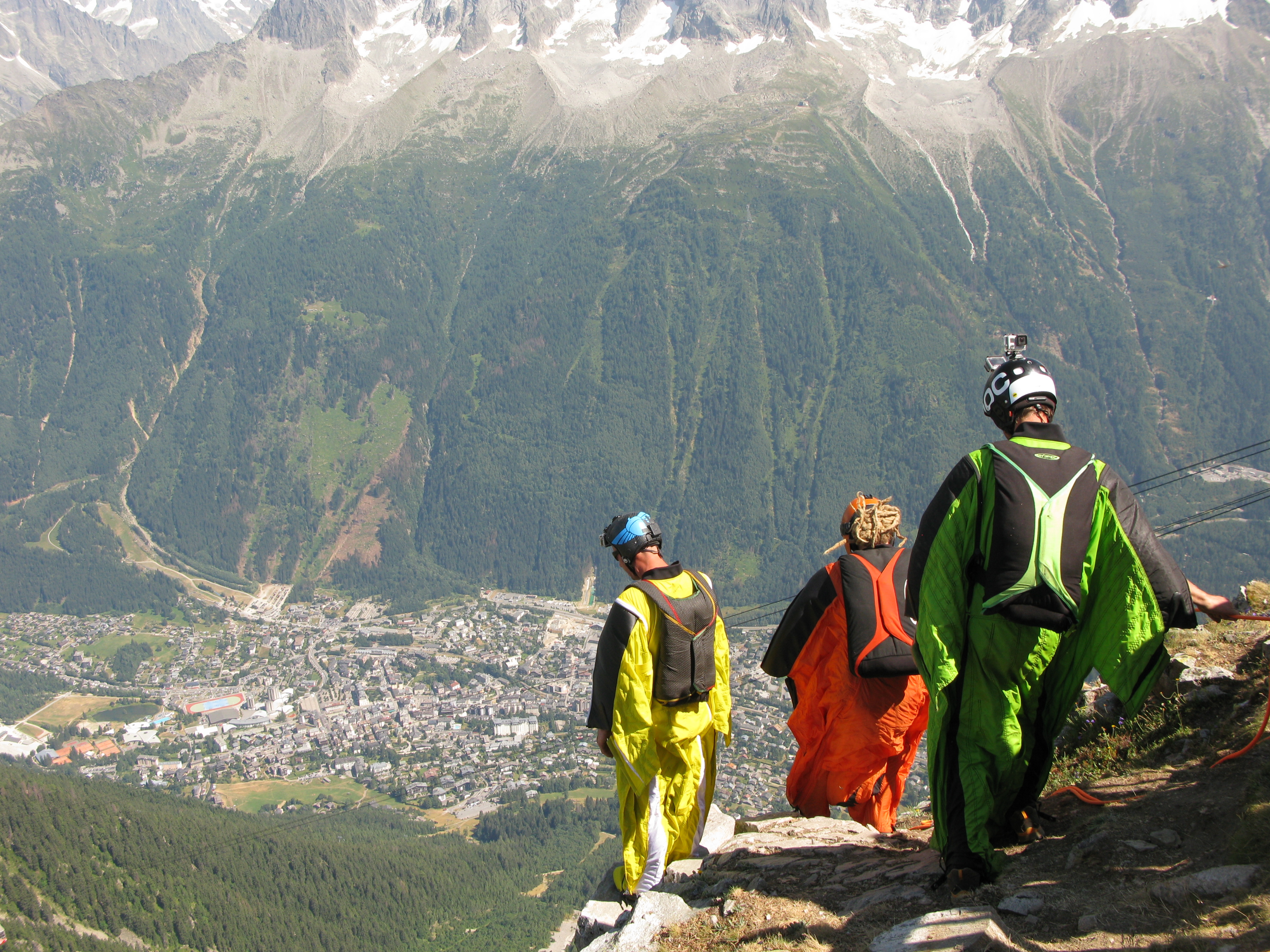
Wingsuit pilots getting ready to jump

Many BASE jumpers are motivated to make jumps from higher objects involving free fall. High BASE jumps are those which are high enough for the jumper to reach terminal velocity. High BASE jumps are often called "slider up" jumps due to the use of a slider reefing device. High BASE jumps present different hazards than low BASE jumps. With greater height and airspeed, jumpers can fly away from the cliff during freefall, allowing them to deploy their parachute far away from the cliff they jumped from and significantly reduce the chance of object striking. However, high BASE jumps also present new hazards such as complications resulting from the use of a wingsuit.

=== Tandem BASE jumps ===
Tandem BASE jumping is when a skilled pilot jumps with a passenger attached to their front. It is similar to skydiving and is offered in the US and many other countries. Tandem BASE is becoming a more accessible and legal form of BASE jumping.

On 20 March 1983, Timothy Cousins performed a BASE jump from the West Gate Bridge in Melbourne, with Shane Sparkes. A subsequent tandem BASE jump was carried out in 1984 by Ted Strong from the New River Gorge Bridge in West Virginia. In 2009, Mark Kissner and Abbie Mashaal began prototyping and manufacturing equipment designed for tandem BASE jumping and established a commercial tandem BASE jumping operation.

== Records ==
Guinness World Records first listed a BASE jumping record with married couple Jean and Carl Boenish's 1984 leap from Trollveggen (Troll Wall) in Norway. It was described at the time as the highest cliff jump. The jump was made two days before Carl's death at the same site.

On August 26, 1992, Australians Nic Feteris and Glenn Singleman made a BASE jump from an altitude of 6,286 metres (20,623 ft) off the Trango Towers in Pakistan. It was the highest BASE jump off the earth at the time.

On May 23, 2006, Glenn Singleman and Heather Swan made a BASE jump from an altitude of 6,604 metres (21,667 ft) off Meru Peak in Northern India, breaking Singleman and Feteris's previous record for the highest BASE jump off the earth. They jumped in wingsuits. In 2015, they also made the first ever wingsuit jump across the Grand Canyon, flying approximately 11 km from one side to the other.

Daniel Schilling set the Guinness World Record for the most BASE jumps in a twenty-four-hour period, jumping off the Perrine Bridge in Twin Falls, Idaho, US a record 201 times on July 8, 2006.

On May 5, 2013, Russian Valery Rozov jumped off Changtse (the northern peak of the Mount Everest massif) from a height of 7,220 metres (23,690 ft). Using a specially developed wingsuit, he glided down to the Rongbuk glacier more than 1,000 meters below, setting a new world record for highest altitude BASE jump.

On October 5, 2016, Rozov broke his own record for highest altitude BASE jump when he leapt from a height of 7,700 metres (25,300 ft) from Cho Oyu, the sixth-highest mountain in the world, landing on a glacier approximately two minutes later at an altitude of around 6,000 metres (20,000 ft). He later died while attempting another high-altitude BASE jump in Nepal in 2017.

== Competitions ==
BASE competitions have been held since the early 1980s, with accurate landings or free-fall aerobatics used as the judging criteria. Recent years have seen a formal competition held at the 452 metres (1,483 ft) high Petronas Towers in Kuala Lumpur, Malaysia, judged on landing accuracy. In 2012 the World Wingsuit League held their first wingsuit BASE jumping competition in China.

== Notable jumps ==
- February 2, 1912, Frederick R. Law parachuted from the top of the torch of the Statue of Liberty, 93 metres (305 ft) above the ground.
- February 4, 1912, Franz Reichelt, tailor, jumped from the first deck of the Eiffel Tower testing his invention, the coat parachute, and died when he hit the ground. It was his first-ever attempt with the parachute and both the authorities and the spectators believed he intended to test it using a dummy.
- In 1913, it is claimed that Štefan Banič successfully jumped from a 15-story building to demonstrate his parachute design.
- In 1913, Russian student Vladimir Ossovski (Владимир Оссовский), from the Saint-Petersburg Conservatory, jumped from the 53-metre (174 ft) high bridge over the river Seine in Rouen (France), using the parachute RK-1, invented a year before that by Gleb Kotelnikov (1872–1944). Ossovski planned to jump from the Eiffel Tower as well, but the Parisian authorities did not allow it.
- In 1965, Erich Felbermayr from Wels jumped from the Kleine Zinne / Cima piccola di Lavaredo in the Dolomites.
- In 1966, Michael Pelkey and Brian Schubert jumped from El Capitan in the Yosemite Valley.
- On January 31, 1972, Rick Sylvester skied off Yosemite Valley's El Capitan, making the first ski-BASE jump.
- On November 9, 1975, the first person to parachute off the CN Tower in Toronto, Ontario, Canada, was Bill Eustace, a member of the tower's construction crew. He was fired.
- On July 22, 1975, Owen J. Quinn parachuted from the North Tower of the World Trade Center to publicize the plight of the poor.
- In 1976, Rick Sylvester skied off Canada's Mount Asgard for the ski chase sequence of the James Bond movie The Spy Who Loved Me, giving the wider world its first look at BASE jumping.
- In 1979, Santee, California skydiver Roger Worthington completed one of the first "Span" jumps when he successfully parachuted off the newly constructed 140 metres (450 ft) Pine Valley Creek Bridge (A.K.A. Nello Irwin Greer Memorial Bridge) on Interstate 8 in San Diego County. Upon take off he held a red smoke flare in each hand. When interviewed afterward he claimed to know of no other "bridge jumpers" in the country.
- On February 22, 1982, Wayne Allwood, an Australian skydiving accuracy champion, parachuted from a helicopter over the Sydney CBD and landed on the small top area of Sydney's Centrepoint Tower, approximately 300 metres (980 ft) above the ground. Upon landing, Allwood discarded and secured his parachute, then used a full-sized reserve parachute to BASE jump into Hyde Park below.
- In November 1983 Max Botto of Venezuela was the first person to BASE jump from Angel Falls
- In 1986, Welshman Eric Jones became the first person to BASE jump from the Eiger.
- On October 22, 1999, Jan Davis died while attempting a BASE jump from El Capitan in Yosemite Valley. Davis' jump was part of an organized act of civil disobedience protesting the NPS air delivery regulations (36 CFR 2.17(a)), which make BASE jumping illegal in national park areas.
- In 2000, Hannes Arch and Ueli Gegenschatz were the first to BASE jump from the 1,800-metre (5,900 ft) high north face of the Eiger.
- In 2005, Karina Hollekim became the first woman to perform a ski-BASE.[citation needed]
- In 2009, three women—29-year-old Australian Livia Dickie, 28-year-old Venezuelan Ana Isabel Dao, and 32-year-old Norwegian Anniken Binz—BASE jumped from Angel Falls, the highest waterfall in the world.
- In September 2013, three men parachuted off the then-under-construction One World Trade Center in New York City. Footage of their jump was recorded using head cams and can be seen on YouTube. In March 2014, the three jumpers turned themselves in. They were sentenced to community service and a fine.

== Comparison with skydiving ==
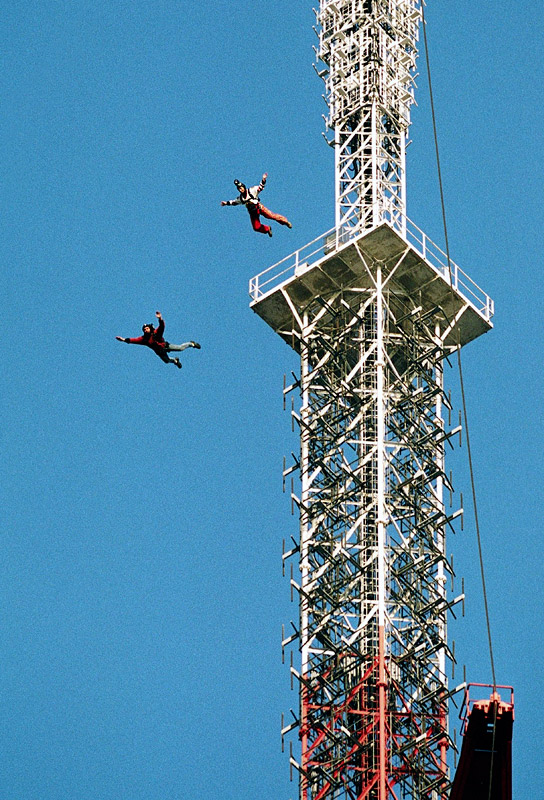
BASE jumping from an antenna tower

BASE jumps are typically performed from much lower altitudes than in skydiving. Skydivers are required to deploy their main parachute above 2,000 feet (610 m) altitude. BASE jumps are frequently made from less than 486 feet (148 m). A BASE jump from a 148-metre (486 ft) object is only about 5.6 seconds from the ground if the jumper remains in free fall. Standard skydiving parachute systems are not designed for this situation, so BASE jumpers use specially designed harnesses and parachute systems.

BASE jumps generally entail slower airspeeds than typical skydives (due to the limited altitude); a BASE jumper does not always reach terminal velocity. Skydivers use the airflow to stabilize their position. BASE jumpers, falling at lower speeds, have less aerodynamic control. The attitude of the body at the moment of jumping determines the stability of flight in the first few seconds, before sufficient airspeed has built up to enable aerodynamic stability. On low BASE jumps, parachute deployment takes place during this early phase of flight. If the parachute is deployed while the jumper is unstable, there is a high risk of entanglement or malfunction. The jumper may also not be facing the right direction. Such an off-heading opening is not as problematic in skydiving, but an off-heading opening that results in object strike has caused many serious injuries and deaths in BASE jumping.

BASE jumps are more hazardous than skydives primarily due to proximity to the object serving as the jump platform. BASE jumping frequently occurs in mountainous terrain, often having much smaller areas in which to land in comparison to a typical skydiving dropzone. BASE jumping is significantly more dangerous than similar sports such as skydiving from aircraft.

== Legality ==
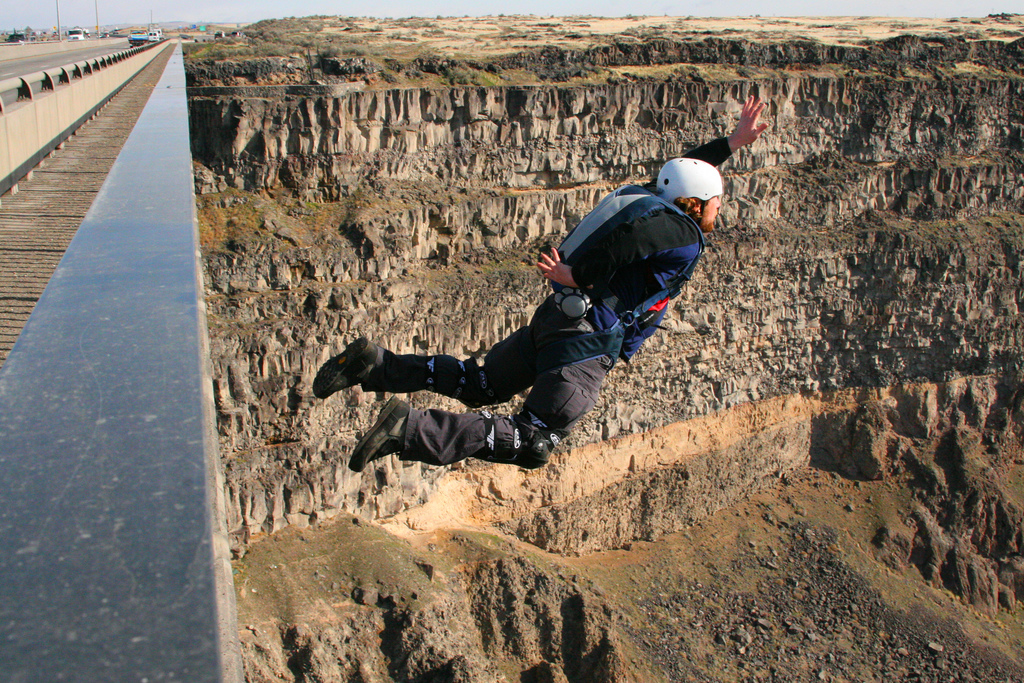
A BASE jumper leaving the Perrine Bridge in Twin Falls, Idaho

BASE jumping is generally not illegal in most places. However, in some cases such as building and antenna jumps, jumping is often done covertly without the permission of owners, which can lead to charges such as trespassing. In some jurisdictions it may be permissible to use land until specifically told not to. The Perrine Bridge in Twin Falls, Idaho, is an example of a man-made structure in the United States where BASE jumping is allowed year-round without a permit.

In U.S. National Parks, BASE jumping is allowed pursuant to the terms of a special use permit. There is no record of the U.S. National Parks granting a permit for BASE jumping, with the sole exception of a permit granted for the annual Bridge Day event in New River Gorge National Park. Other U.S. public land, including land controlled by the Bureau of Land Management, does not ban BASE jumping, and there are numerous jumpable objects on BLM land.

The legal position is different at other sites and in other countries. For example, in Norway's Lysefjord (from the mountain Kjerag), BASE jumpers are made welcome. Many sites in the European Alps, near Chamonix and on the Eiger, are also open to jumpers. Some other Norwegian places, like the Troll Wall, are banned because of dangerous rescue missions in the past. In Austria, jumping from mountain cliffs is generally allowed, whereas the use of bridges (such as the Europabruecke near Innsbruck, Tirol) or dams is generally prohibited. Australia has some of the toughest stances on BASE jumping: it specifically bans BASE jumping from certain objects, such as the Sydney Harbour Bridge.

== Safety ==
Recent statistics reflect improved safety during the modern era of the activity. The 2024 Bridge Day Event which saw the participation of 325 BASE jumpers completing 755 BASE jumps resulted in zero jumper injuries, in contrast to two non-jumper related medical transports from the same event. In the year 2023, the United States saw zero BASE fatalities. There have been no rescues related to BASE jumping in the past four years in Yosemite National Park despite it being one of the highest volume locations for wingsuit flying in the United States.

Data from the earliest pre-2010 era of BASE jumping reflects greater risk. A study of BASE jumping fatalities estimated that the overall annual fatality risk in 2002 was one fatality per 60 participants. A study of 20,850 BASE jumps from the Kjerag Massif in Norway reported nine fatalities over the 11-year period from 1995 to 2005, or one in every 2,317 jumps. However, at that site, one in every 254 jumps over that period resulted in a nonfatal accident. BASE jumping is one of the most dangerous recreational activities in the world, with a fatality and injury rate 43 times higher than that of parachuting from a plane.

As of 4 January 2023, the BASE Fatality List records 480 deaths for BASE jumping since April 1981.
