= Michael Pelkey =

American daredevil

Michael Pelkey (March 28, 1940 - January 14, 2024) was considered one of the first individuals to influence the mass practice of BASE jumping as a sport, together with fellow skydiver Brian Schubert. Pelkey and Schubert's first jump was made on July 24, 1966, from the summit of El Capitan mountain. Pelkey made his second jump on October 15, 2005, at the 26th annual Bridge Day event where he and Shubert were attending as guest speakers. Pelkey's planned third jump at the 27th annual Bridge Day in 2006 was unperformed due to the death of Schubert, from a parachute malfunction, moments before Pelkey's jump.

== BASE jumping ==
On July 24, 1966, Pelkey and Brian Schubert made the first parachute jumps from the top of the El Capitan mountain in Yosemite National Park. El Capitan is among the world's tallest sheer monoliths, ascending more than 3,000 feet (910 m) straight up from Yosemite Valley. It is the second-highest unbroken cliff in the world, the highest being Mount Thor on Baffin Island in the Canadian Arctic.

In 1980, the idea of fixed object jumping was expanded by Carl Boenish into the concept of BASE jumping (buildings, antennae, spans, and earth), including an exclusive club made up of those who made at least one jump from each of the four categories. Members of this club are awarded a number based on the date of their qualification. The sport of BASE jumping, practiced worldwide today and one of the original extreme sports, was inspired in part by Pelkey and Schubert's El Capitan jump.

== Later years ==
Pelkey and Schubert were honored as guest speakers at the 26th annual "Bridge Day" event in Fayetteville, West Virginia, on October 15, 2005, where 175,000 spectators converged over the course of the day to take part in the festival. Approximately 450 BASE jumpers from all over the world made more than 800 parachute jumps off the New River Gorge Bridge into the New River Gorge, 876 feet (267 m) below. The New River Gorge Bridge is the second highest span and one of the few places in the United States where BASE-jumping is legal for six hours, one day a year.

Pelkey made his second BASE jump at the 2005 Bridge Day event from the New River Gorge Bridge. He and Schubert planned to jump together at the 2006 event, a few months after the 40th anniversary of their first El Capitan jump. Schubert died jumping at that event, just minutes before Pelkey was scheduled to jump.

== Sources ==
- Ghiglieri, M. P.; Farabee, C. R. (2007). Off the Wall: Death in Yosemite. Flagstaff: Puma Press. ISBN 9780970097378.
- Intini, J. (13 November 2006). "The End: Brian Schubert, 1940–2006". Maclean's. Vol. 119, no. 45. p. 160. Archived from the original on 26 March 2019.
