= Hans Röthlisberger =

Hans Röthlisberger (1 February 1923 – 10 September 2009) was a Swiss earth scientist and glaciologist best known for his work on glacier hazards and their prevention, glacier geophysics and subglacial hydrology.

== Early life and education ==
Hans (his given name) was born on February 1, 1923, in Langnau, Canton Bern, Switzerland. After completing formal education as a teacher training in Bern he began studies in the earth sciences at ETH Zürich (ETHZ) in 1943, where he earned his diploma in 1947. Röthlisberger then embarked on a PhD on the topic of seismic investigations of molasse rocks, under the guidance of Professor Dr. F. Gassmann at the Geophysical Institute of ETH Zürich. His interest in glaciers was fostered by his mountaineering activities, and while working on his PhD, Hans Röthlisberger participated in scientific expeditions in eastern Greenland (1951; EGIG, Expédition Glaciologique Internationale au Groenland) and on Baffin Island (1950 and 1953), where he performed seismic geophysical experiments on glaciers.

== Further work ==
His work on glaciers led him to be awarded a tenured position in 1954 in the Hydrology Section of the "Versuchsanstalt für Wasserbau und Erdbau"(Laboratory of Hydraulics and Earthworks) (VAWE, ETH Zürich) under the leadership of Prof.Ing. Peter Kasser. From 1957 to 1961, Hans worked as a contract scientist at the US Army Snow, Ice and Permafrost Research Establishment (SIPRE, now known as the US Army Cold Regions Research and Engineering Laboratory, USA CRREL) then in Wilmette, Illinois. During that time, he participated in scientific expeditions to Thule, West Greenland. From 1961 until his retirement in 1988, "Tschoon" (John), as he came to be known, continued his career at the VAWE, (VAW, after 1970).

Röthlisberger produced two important monographs when at CRREL; one on seismic properties of ice the other on ice and glacier resistivity measurements that remain significant contributions to the properties of ice.

At VAW, under Professor Peter Kasser, Hans Röthlisberger performed pioneering work on risk management and problems related to glacier hazards (e.g., Mattmark/Allalin glacier 1965, Bisgletscher/Randa 1972, and the potential ice dammed lake (GLOF) failure at Grubengletscher above Saas Balen in Kanton Wallis. He also devised quantitative engineering measures of determining the bearing capacity for frozen lakes, specifically the frozen Lake Zürich, or "Seegfrörni" in 1963.

As well as being associated with the annual glaciological reports on Swiss glaciers (now called 'The Swiss Glaciers') with Peter Kasser and Markus Aellen, Röthlisberger and Hebert Lang focused on the area of subglacial hydrology as a consequence of the ice-dammed lake work. He made a name with his theory of subglacial channel hydraulics, first described in one of the most frequently cited papers of the Journal of Glaciology now known as "R (for Röthlisberger)-channels. This work also served as his habilitation thesis for his qualification as a "Dozent" at ETH Zürich, a degree awarded in 1972. Röthlisberger's 1972 paper follows Robert Haefeli's work on sliding of the Unteraargletscher and is reviewed in the light of subsequent work by Joseph Walder.

Röthlisberger also produced papers on glacial geomorphology, on glacier erosion and glacier mapping.

In recognition of his scientific work, Hans Röthlisberger was awarded the title of Professor by the Swiss Federal Government in 1984, and the Seligman Crystal from the International Glaciological Society (IGS) in 1992 and was President of the Society from 1984 to 1987. In retirement, Hans Röthlisberger became Professor Emeritus in 1988.
