= List of aircraft braking systems =

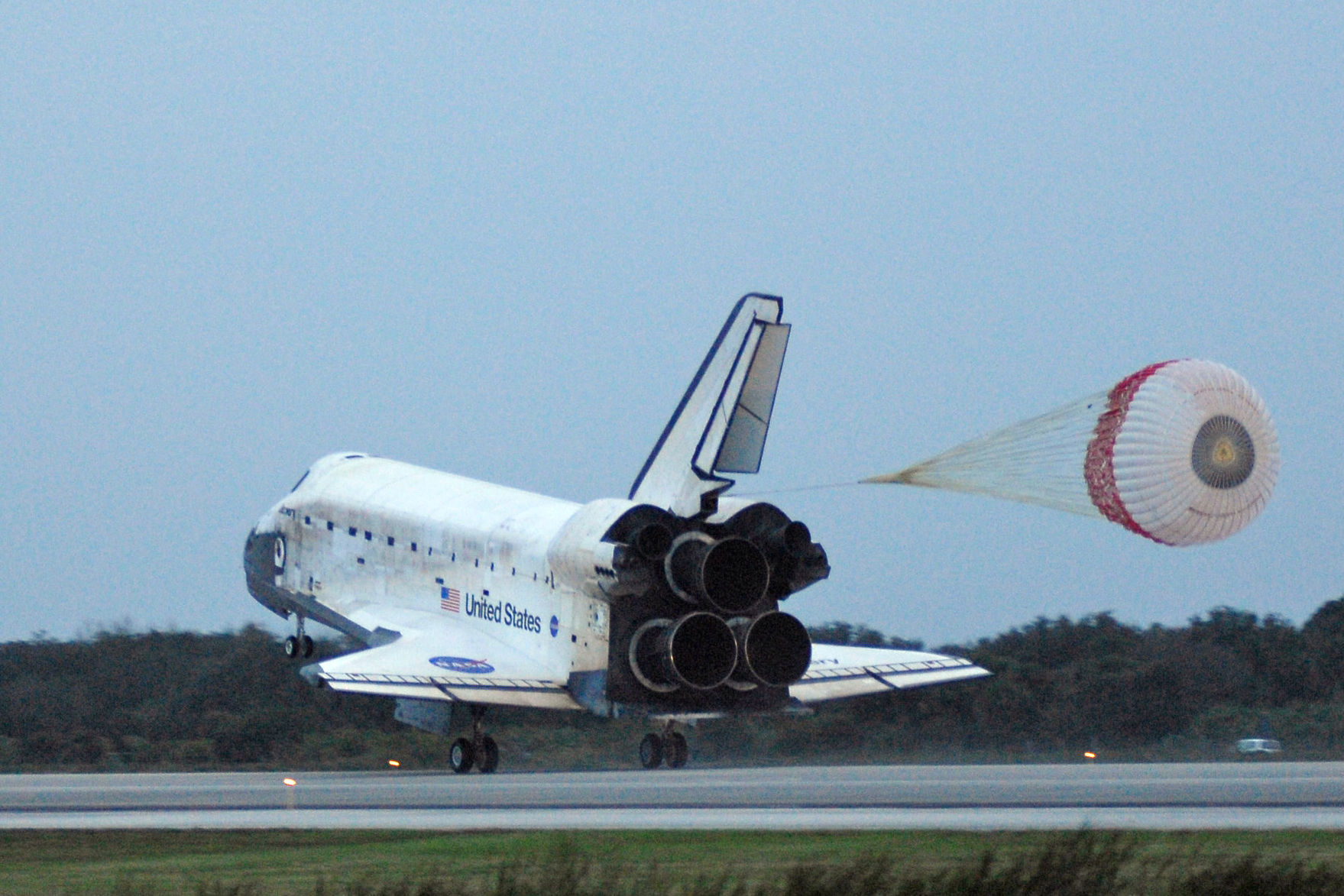
Space Shuttle Discovery landing after STS-116, with its drogue parachute deployed and its rudder split to act as an air brake.

Aircraft braking systems include:

- Aircraft disc brakes in the landing gear, used to brake the wheels while touching the ground. These brakes are operated hydraulically, pneumatically or electrically. In most modern aircraft they are activated by the top section of the rudder pedals ("toe brakes"). In some older aircraft, the bottom section is used instead ("heel brakes"). Levers are used in a few aircraft. Most aircraft are capable of differential braking.
- Thrust reversers, that allow thrust from the engines to be used to slow the aircraft.
- Air brakes, dedicated flight control surfaces that work by increasing drag.
- Large drogue parachutes, used by several former and current military and civilian aircraft (examples include the American B-52 and the soviet Tu-134 and Tu-144) and in the Space Shuttle.
