= Cythera (yacht) =

Former Australian Yacht

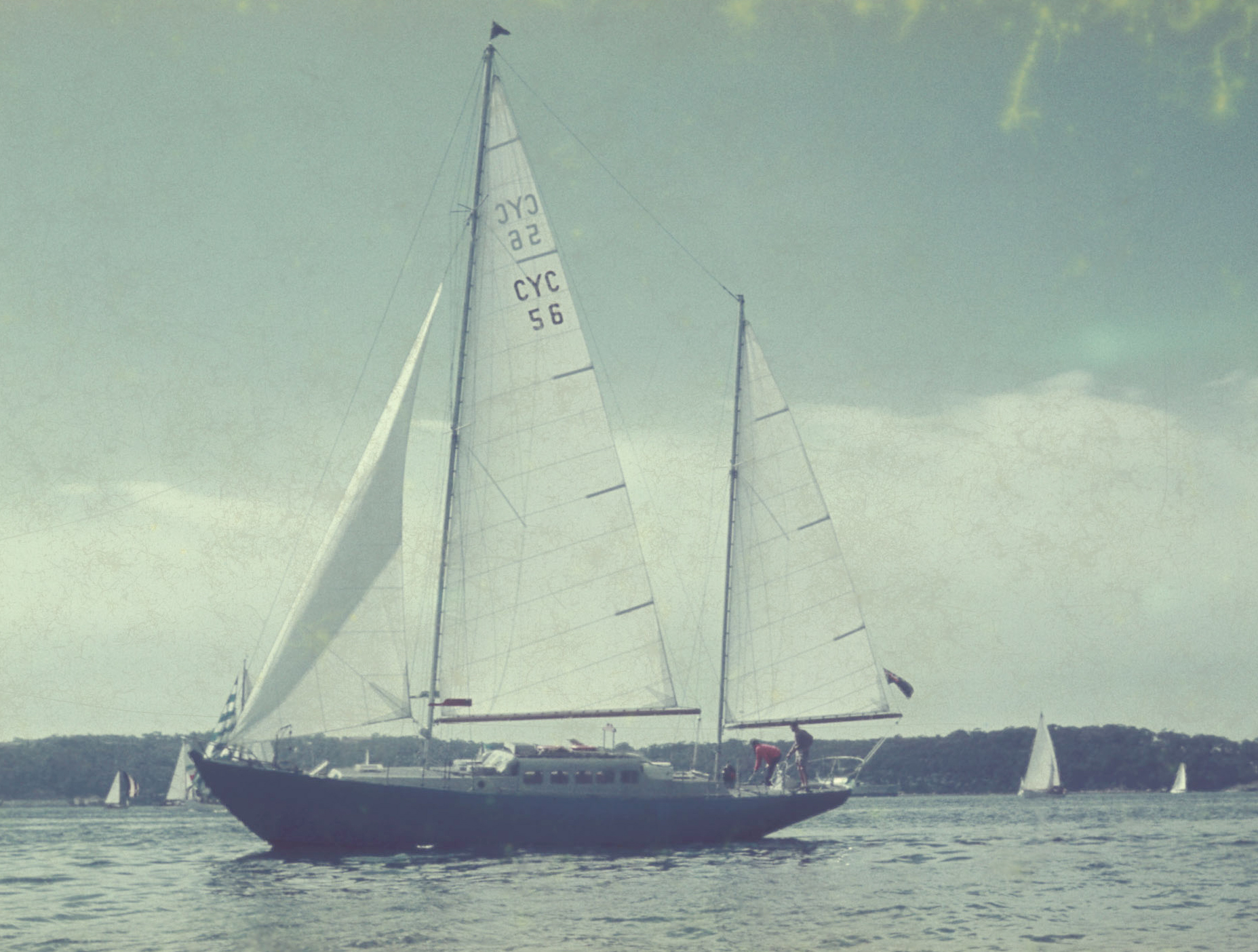
- Sydney Harbour, 1962

History

Blue Ensign
- Name: Cythera
- Owner: Peter A. Fenton
- Port of registry: Sydney. Lloyds Yacht Register VJZP 316113
- Builder: Peter A. Fenton
- Launched: 17 March 1962
- Maiden voyage: 31 March 1963
- Fate: Lost

General characteristics
- Type: Ketch
- Tonnage: 31.29 tons gross, 24.18 tons net and 26 tons Thames Measurement
- Length: 43.2 ft (13.17 m)
- Beam: 12.5 ft (3.81 m)
- Draught: 7 ft (2.13 m)

Cythera (/ˈsaɪθərə/ SY-thər-ə), a 50-foot (15 m) steel ketch, designed and built single-handedly by Peter A. Fenton, was the first subject of modern-day piracy in Australian history and set a legal precedent to laws in effect from 1858.

== Background and design ==
In the 1940s, after being discharged from the Royal Navy and spending one cold winter back in his native England, Peter Fenton left for warmer climates and moved to Epo, Indonesia. There, he ran a tin mine until the 1945 revolution compelled him to leave. Fenton arrived in Sydney in 1947. He eventually married and had one child.

In 1961, aged 37, Fenton decided he would build a boat and go sailing. He spent a year teaching himself about yacht design and started night school to learn welding, since he had decided to build his boat of steel for strength instead of wood as previously planned. (It would have been a schooner named Misty Isles). The renowned yacht designer Alan Payne commented that it was a "very hazardous undertaking to build of steel". On 23 January 1961, construction began in a rented lot below Sutherland Road in Paddington, New South Wales, which threatened to collapse on the almost finished yacht during torrential flooding in November of that year.

== 1963 maiden voyage ==
17 March 1962 saw Cythera launched between Timber Wharves 1 & 2 at Walsh Bay (The Rocks), and the next year was spent building steel masts for the ketch. On 31 March 1963, Fenton and his family, along with crew members Daniel Barrie and Derrick 'Ricky' Brewin and a journalist friend named Charlie Schriber, departed on the maiden voyage to Lord Howe Island en route to New Zealand.

Departing Sydney, 31 March 1963

On the evening of 10 April, having arrived at Lord Howe Island on 7 April, all persons from Cythera were ashore for dinner. Barrie and Brewin left early, cut Cythera's anchor chains and sailed out of range of the local radar station. They headed for Rapa Iti and South America, where there were no extradition treaties at the time, lest they be apprehended, bringing a 5-gallon container of grey paint and several navigational charts. They renamed the vessel the Jenny 2 and, according to the logbook, "Took the yacht away from mooring. As lives were in jeopardy including the Captain's wife and daughter. It is assumed the captain [Fenton] is unbalanced. Our destination is unknown as yet". Marooned, and with nothing but what they had on their persons, Fenton's family and Schriber were generously accommodated at the island guest house, Fair Winds, until a Qantas flight for Sydney was available on 13 April. In Sydney, arrest warrants were issued and extradition expenses were guaranteed by Fenton. The family were accommodated by relatives while Schriber returned to his home.

Route of maiden voyage

On Sunday, 14 April, authorities received a report that Cythera had been located on a private radar screen in Glen Innes, in northern New South Wales. A telegram confirming same was sent. Upon police investigation, it was found that the "radar station" was a piece of tin on a pole, and the telegram a hoax.

Hoax telegram sent to Peter Fenton 14 April 1963

Cythera was missing for seven days when, on 17 April, the administrator of Norfolk Island advised the authorities in Sydney that the yacht was in the area. The administrator was instructed to put a police officer (being the administrator himself, being only police officer on the island) aboard the freighter Colorado del Mar to apprehend the thieves. The administrator's launch accompanied the freighter.

Since Cythera could manoeuvre more handily, the crew on Colorado del Mar resorted to pelting the thieves with potatoes and bottles filled with water in an effort to capture the vessel. Unsuccessful, the freighter rammed the yacht (1,025 imperial tons compared to Cythera's 22 imperial tons) amidships on the starboard side twice. This caused the thieves to jump overboard. They were apprehended by the launch.

View of ramming from the Colorado Del Mar, Norfolk Island, April 1963

Another view of ramming from the Colorado Del Mar, Norfolk Island, April 1963

Pirates apprehended, aboard Admiralty launch. 17 April 1963

Damaged, moored to whale buoy, Cascade Bay, Norfolk Island, 1963

Extended view of damage. Cascade Bay, Norfolk Island, 1963

Cythera was brought to Cascade Bay, Norfolk Island, and thoroughly ransacked for any valuables. The radio was disabled and thus of no further use. When the yacht was reported stolen, notices were posted for all ships and aircraft to be on the lookout, and only when located could something be done since Lord Howe Island is 500 miles northeast of Sydney and Norfolk Island is a further 500 miles northeast of Lord Howe Island. Both islands are under Australian jurisdiction.

Fenton, Pat, and two volunteers flew to Norfolk Island accompanied by two police officers to extradite the 'pirates', the four returning to Sydney the same afternoon at Fenton's expense. The party remained on the island to effect minor repairs and sail back to Sydney. This necessitated reduced jury rig, due to damage to rigging and spreaders on both masts along with the deckhouse windows being smashed in with only a tarpaulin to keep out water and weather.

The weather was building, and it was imperative to leave Cascade Bay for survival, so Cythera, with a damaged hull and masts, motored 150 miles before a tropical cyclone and low pressure system hit, and the ship drifted, lying ahull, for 5 days until the system cleared and very restricted sail was raised. A week later, another tropical cyclone came through, lasting 4 days. Again, the yacht drifted, lying ahull, before a rough position was established. Cythera headed, once more, for Sydney. The northward drift was estimated at 250 miles.

The decision was made that if any aircraft was heard or sighted a white flare would be fired to attract attention. An aircraft was detected, and two white flares were fired since the aircraft was in clouds. The aircraft was from the U.S. aircraft carrier USS Coral Sea (aptly named to be in the area), and the windows of the aircraft were tinted red, causing the white flares to appear red, resulting in a real emergency search. At 9:30 p.m., a Royal Australian Air Force Neptune Bomber, with spotlights blazing, flew in at mast height and dropped sodium flares around Cythera. The Norwegian freighter Prinsdal was instructed to identify and verify yacht and condition of crew. News broke that the missing ship was found. This news was heard on a small transistor radio on board.

Cythera powered away from the freighter for safety, then raised sail to proceed to Sydney as instructed but, apparently, was expected to arrive within hours and was again deemed to be "missing".

Departing Norfolk Island for Sydney, 1963

At midnight, Saturday, 11 May, Cythera confirmed position being off the Barrenjoey Light, approximately 20 miles north of Sydney. The remaining fuel was unknown, but Cythera motored the remaining distance in a flat, oily swell, arriving at the Cruising Yacht Club of Australia dock at 4:45 a.m., 12 May.

== Timeline ==
- Sunday, 31 March 1963: Depart Sydney
  Starboard gunwale damage view. Sydney, 1963
  View of hull damage. Sydney, 1963
- Sunday, 7 April 1963: Anchor in lagoon, Lord Howe Island
- Wednesday, 10 April 1963: Cythera stolen
- Saturday, 13 April 1963: Fentons and Schriber return to Sydney
- Wednesday, 17 April 1963: Cythera recovered
- Saturday, 20 April 1963: Fentons, volunteer crew and police officers arrive in Norfolk Island
- Monday, 22 April 1963: Cythera departs Norfolk Island for Sydney
- Friday, 10 May 1963: Flares fired to overhead aircraft. Freighter "Prinsdal" alongside Cythera
- Sunday, 12 May 1963: Docked at Cruising Yacht Club of Australia 4:45 a.m.

== Theft aftermath ==
Within a week of arriving back in Sydney, Peter was served with a writ for salvage by the owner of the Colorado del Mar, which involved the owners of Cythera giving an undertaking in court. The vessel would not be removed from the jurisdiction of the Courts until 21 days after the final judgment in the case. As the masts were steel, the Writ was taped to the foremast. The following week, Cythera was in dry dock, in Castlecrag, undergoing repairs. The repairs continued for the next two years

Lloyd's of London, Cythera's insurers, insisted the Fentons defend the salvage suit, since this would set a legal precedent in the 20th century. The Fentons did not know at the time but, when the judgment of piracy was handed down in 1963, acts of piracy, acts of war, acts of insurrection and acts of god were not covered by insurance. All the costs were incumbent on the Fentons.

Daniel Barrie and Derrick (Ricky) Brewin were convicted of piracy and given four-year sentences. Derrick Brewin appealed against his four-year sentence. Justice Herron described it as "less than he deserved" and said, "In another day and age you would have been described as a pirate and that is what you are. You would have been hanged at one time too." They served two and a half years and were released before Cythera sailed again in 1966.

== Second voyage ==
In 1966, still determined to sail again, Peter advertised for a "girl crew", which prompted a police investigation on the grounds that he was soliciting women. After the story of the boat theft by the male crew was considered, police decided there was no solicitation involved, only an attempt at a safer crew by Fenton. Cleared of any doubt, Cythera sailed, once more, east into the Pacific, with one man aboard (Bob Coupland) as crew, destination Lord Howe Island, to retrieve the ground tackle jettisoned when the ship was stolen.

Repaired, Rockhampton, 1966

Second voyage crew: Peter, Penelope, Pat. Rockhampton 1966. Taman Shud.

Two days out of Lord Howe Island, another cyclonic low pressure system built over Lord Howe Island and the pressure was so deep, the course was changed to Brisbane, Queensland, for safety. On entering the Brisbane River, Cythera received a police escort to their pier, where Peter was questioned about causing a publicity scam since he hadn't arrived in Lord Howe. Again, his decision was vindicated because the weather he avoided caused the loss of two vessels inside the reef at the island, and it was presumed that nothing would survive at sea if caught in the depression.

Departure north for Papua New Guinea took Cythera to Gladstone and while anchored behind Heron Island, in more bad weather, raising the anchor created an accident for the crewman, Bob. Peter motored the ship 90 miles West, to Rockhampton for the crewman's hospital needs.

The continuing journey, from Rockhampton, was crewed by the Fenton family, Peter, Pat and daughter Penelope.

The Australian cyclone season was spent in Port Moresby, Papua New Guinea. Cythera then headed for Durban, South Africa, via Christmas Island; Cocos Keeling; Mauritius and Réunion and was the first yacht of the season to arrive in Durban, South Africa in September 1967.

They then departed for the Virgin Islands in mid January 1968, stopping in Port Elizabeth, East London, Mossel Bay and Cape Town, South Africa, continuing up the South Atlantic via Saint Helena, Ascension and Fernando de Noronha Islands, then sighting the waters of the Amazon and making landfall in the Caribbean in Antigua – thence to St. Thomas, where she dropped anchor before hurricane season in 1968.

Cythera spent 20 years as home to Peter and Pat, while they made Marine Diesel Services their livelihood. Peter suffered a debilitating stroke in 1984, which virtually closed down his business and the ability to maintain his ship. Cythera was sold and the Fentons moved to Southwest Florida. Peter died on 22 February 2002. Patricia died 27 June 2021 in Birmingham, Alabama where she lived with her daughter.

== Fate ==
Cythera's new owner fitted her out for charter guests and eventually took her to Venezuela for a total refit. After two years on the hard, Cythera's next voyage was headed to Trinidad in December 2003 (to meet Peter's wife who was on a cruise ship, visiting), but the weather again forced a change of course for the new captain, and he headed to Jamaica.

A major breakdown in the steering system occurred. The new owner and crew stepped off onto a container ship, and Cythera was abandoned. After 10 days, she was located ashore on the Silver Shoals, southeast of Kingston, Jamaica. The steel masts were smashed almost in half, the booms were torn off the masts, and she had been rammed on the starboard side and the hull was damaged.

It was 40 years to the month (March 2004), since the maiden voyage of the Cythera from Sydney, and the damage was on the same side of the hull as the first ramming. The new owner sold the hulk to the fisherman who discovered her and walked away.

== Photo gallery ==
Stranded on Lord Howe Island

Log Book page where Derrick (Ricky) Brewin suggests Captain Peter Fenton is unbalanced and his family in danger. 10 April 1963

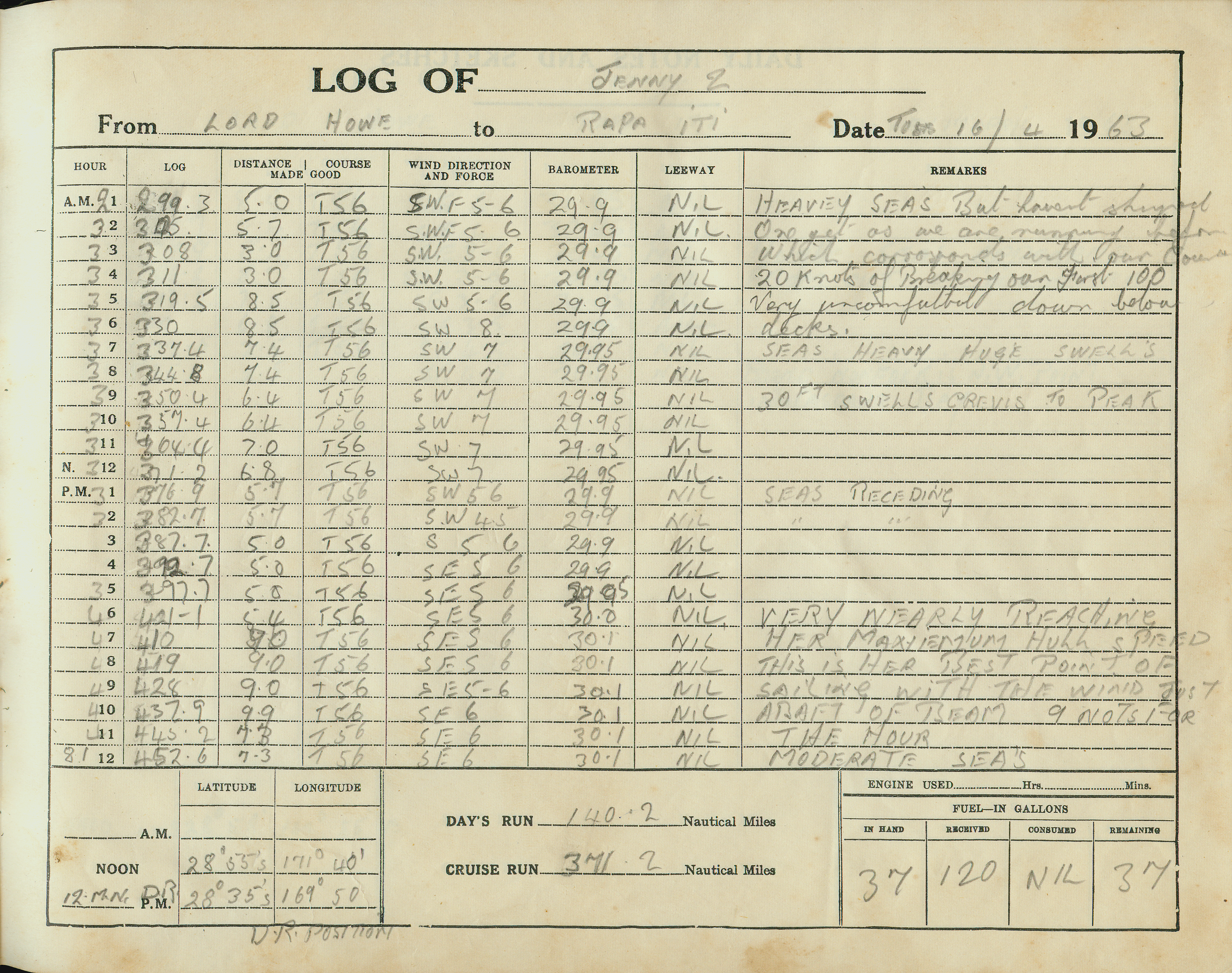
Log Book page where vessel name is changed to Jenny 2. 10 April 1963

Log Book page describing sighting of vessel and discharge of 3 white flares. 9 May 1963

Log Book page describing sighting of aircraft, discharge of 2 white flares. Neptune Bomber drops flares and intercepted by Norwegian tanker Prinsdal. 10 May 1963

Log Book page describing weather and sailing conditions that caused the loss of two vessels. 25 April 1966
