= Air brake (aeronautics) =

Flight control surface meant to increase drag

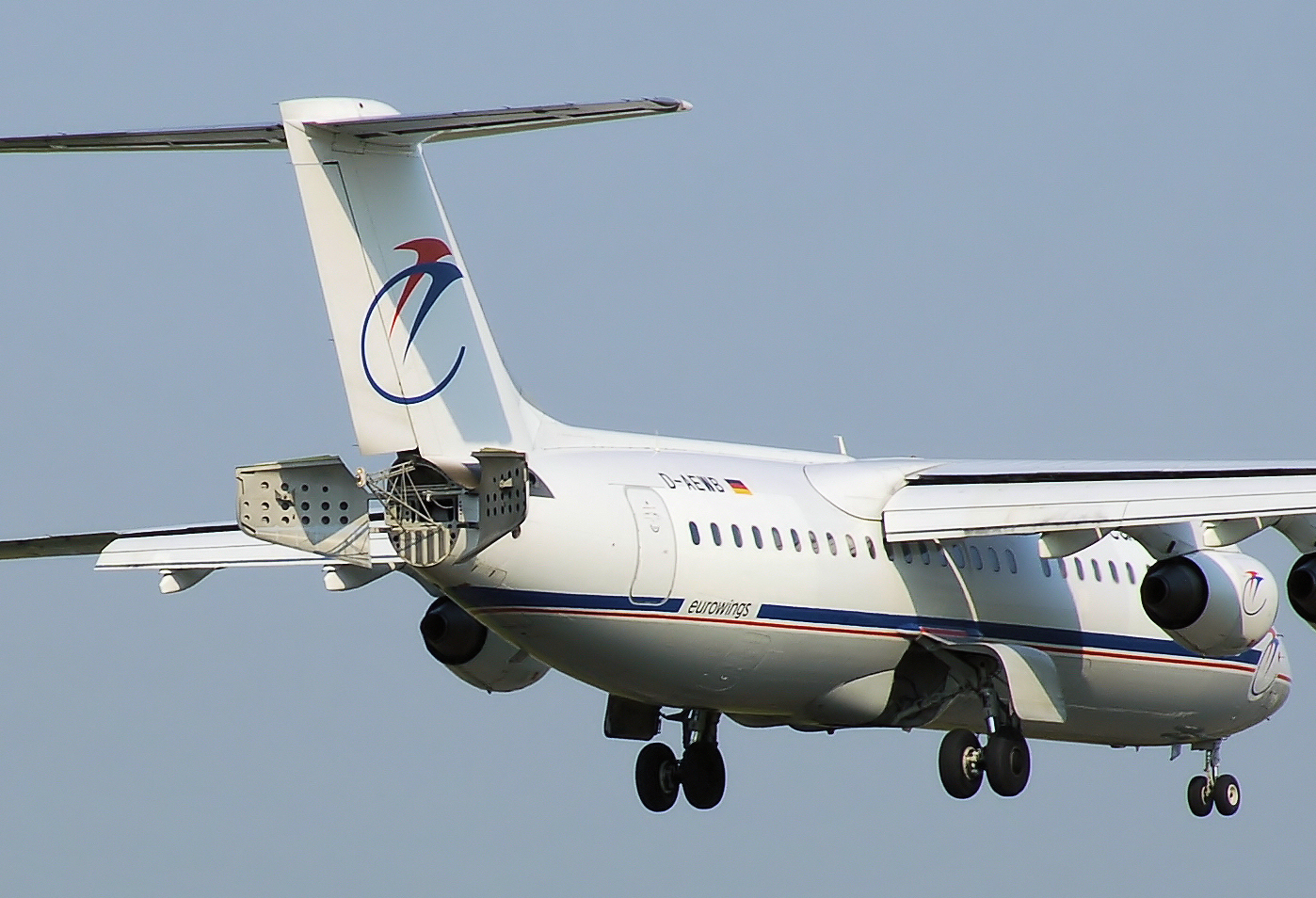
Air brakes on the rear fuselage of a Eurowings BAe 146-300

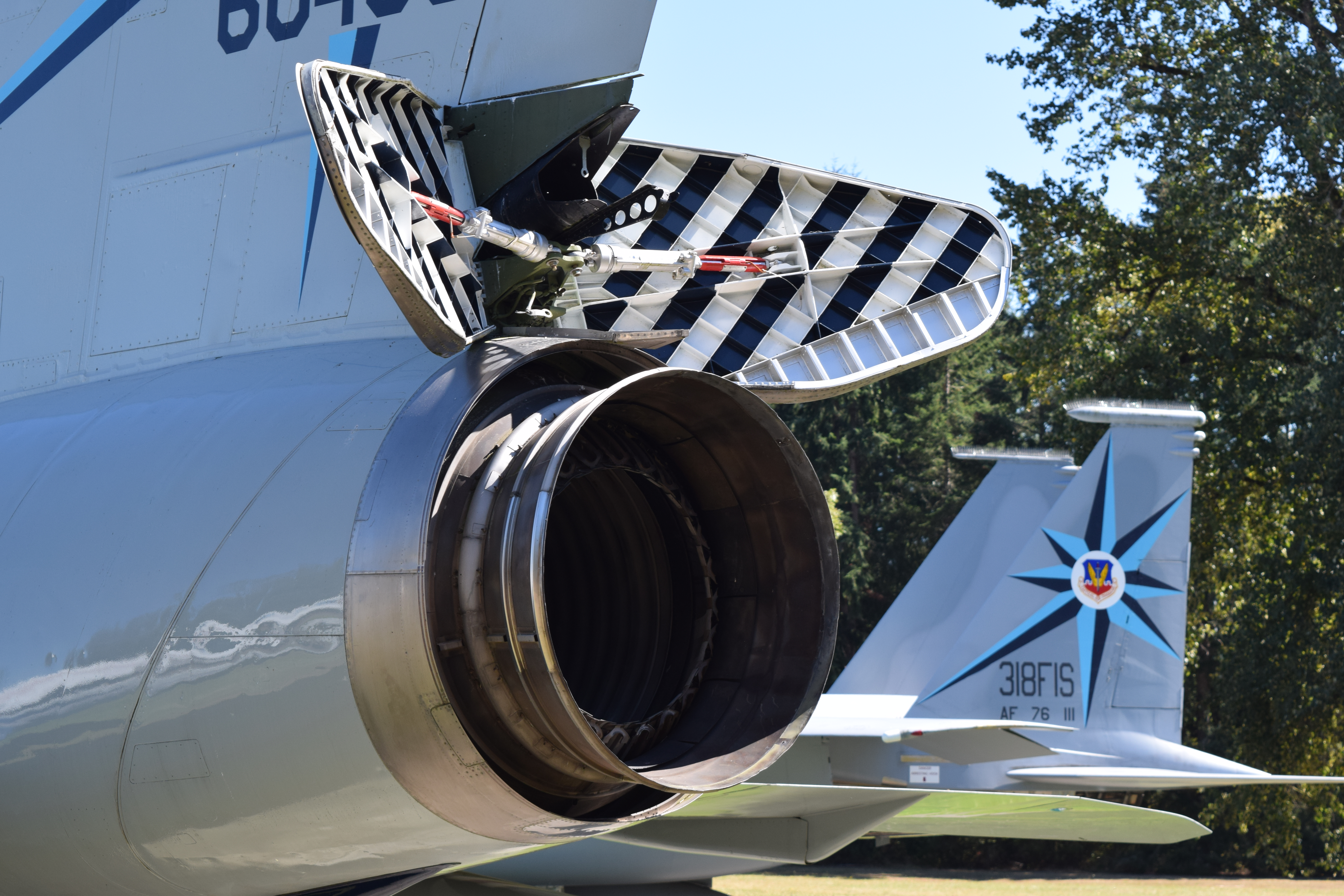
Convair F-106 Delta Dart air brake deployed

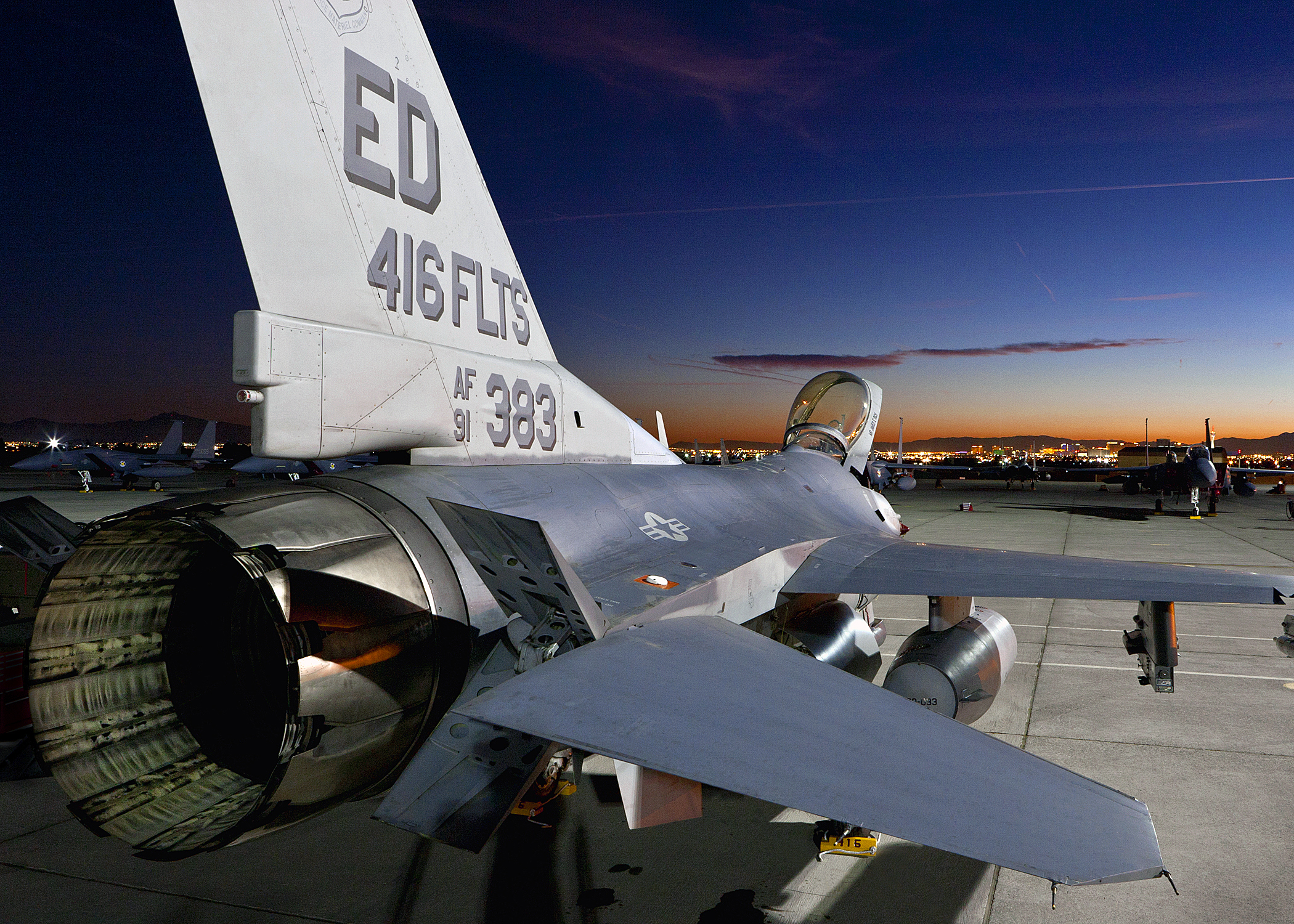
A U.S. Air Force F-16 Fighting Falcon showing its split speed brakes inboard of the stabilators or "tailerons"

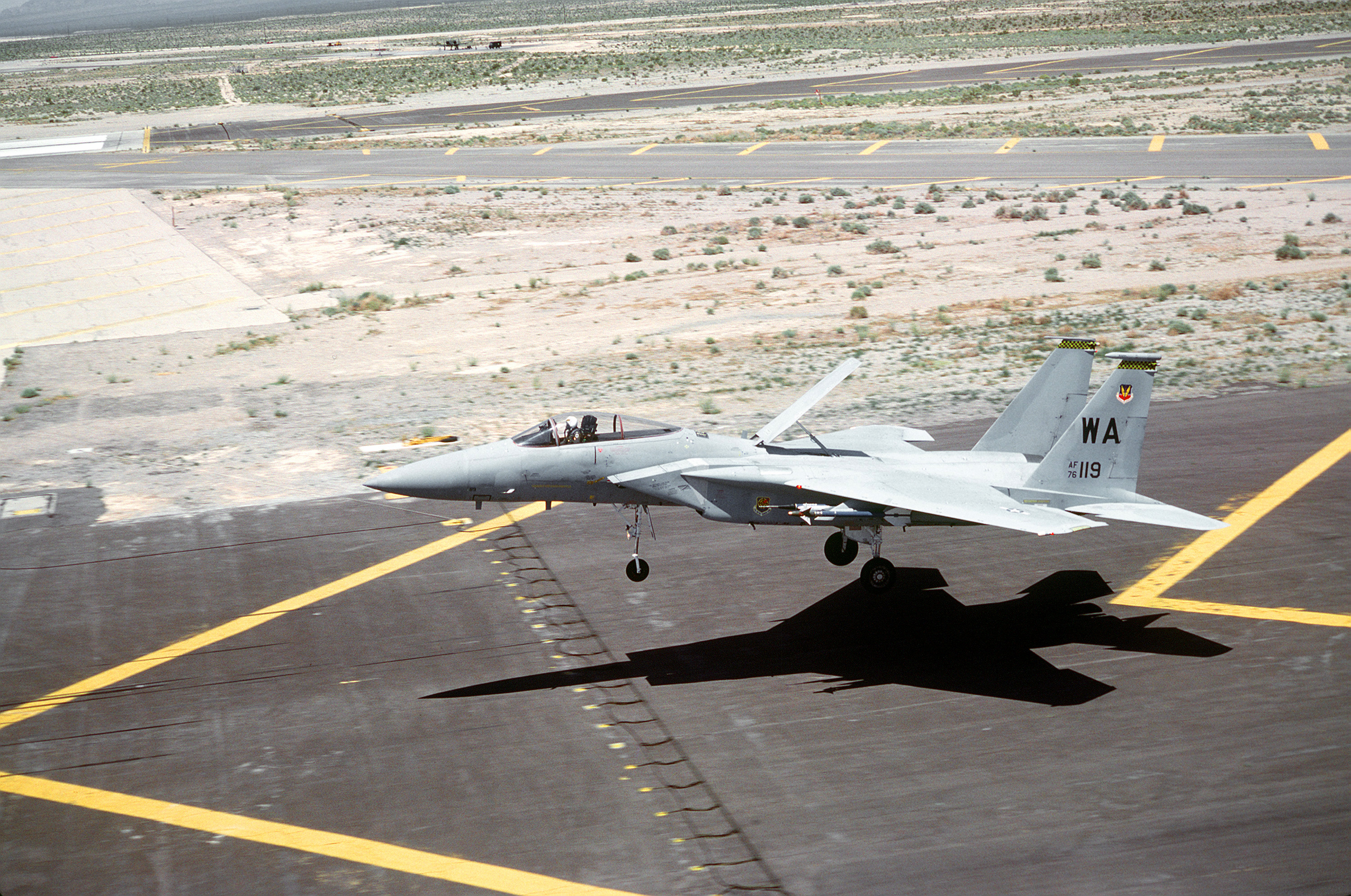
An F-15 landing with its large dorsal air brake panel deployed

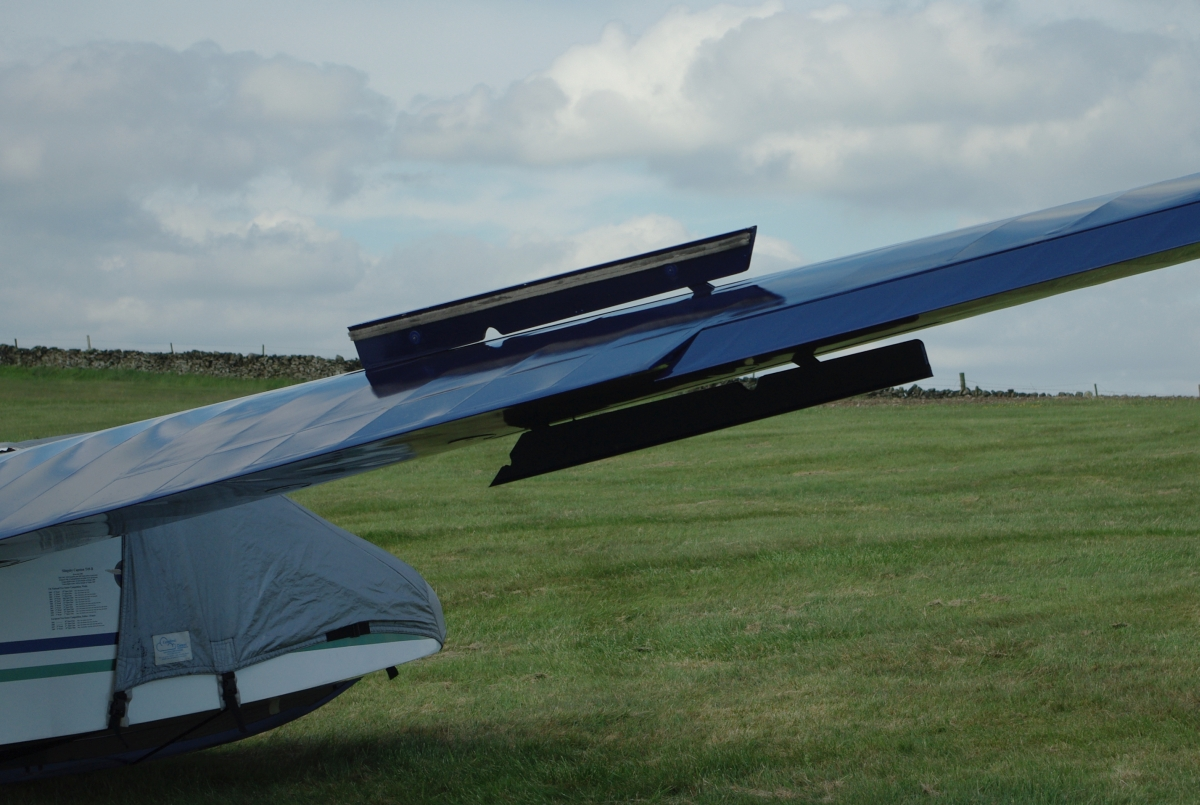
Extended DFS-type air brakes on a Slingsby Capstan

In aeronautics, air brakes, or speed brakes, are a type of flight control surface used on an aircraft to increase the drag on the aircraft. When extended into the airstream, air brakes cause an increase in the drag on the aircraft. When not in use, they conform to the local streamlined profile of the aircraft in order to help minimize drag.

Air brakes differ from spoilers in that air brakes are designed to increase drag while making little change to lift, whereas spoilers reduce the lift-to-drag ratio and require a higher angle of attack to maintain lift, resulting in a higher stall speed. However, flight spoilers are routinely referred to as "speed brakes" on transport aircraft by pilots and manufacturers, despite significantly reducing lift.

== History ==
In the early decades of powered flight, air brakes were flaps mounted on the wings. They were manually controlled by a lever in the cockpit, and mechanical linkages to the air brake.

Another early type of air brake, developed in 1931, was fitted to aircraft wing support struts.

In 1936, Hans Jacobs, who headed Nazi Germany's Deutsche Forschungsanstalt für Segelflug (DFS) glider research organization before World War II, developed blade-style self-operating dive brakes, on the upper and lower surface of each wing, for gliders. Most early gliders were equipped with spoilers on the wings in order to adjust their angle of descent during approach to landing. More modern gliders use air brakes that may spoil lift as well as increase drag, dependent on where they are positioned.

A British report written in 1942 discusses the need for dive brakes to enable dive bombers, torpedo bombers and fighter aircraft to meet their respective combat performance requirements and, more generally, glide-path control. It discusses different types of air brakes and their requirements, in particular that they should have no appreciable effect on lift or trim and how this may be achieved with split trailing edge flaps on the wings, for example. There was also a requirement to vent the brake surfaces using numerous perforations or slots to reduce airframe buffeting.

A US report written in 1949 describes numerous air brake configurations, and their performance, on wings and fuselage for propeller and jet aircraft.

== Air brake configurations ==
Often, characteristics of both spoilers and air brakes are desirable and are combined – most modern airliner jets feature combined spoiler and air brake controls. On landing, the deployment of these spoilers ("lift dumpers") causes a significant reduction in wing lift, so the weight of the aircraft is transferred from the wings to the undercarriage. The increased weight increases the available friction force for braking. In addition, the form drag created by the spoilers directly assists the braking effect. Reverse thrust is also used to help slow the aircraft after landing.

Virtually all jet-powered aircraft have an air brake or, in the case of most airliners, flight spoilers that also generate drag, albeit with the additional lift dumping effect. Propeller-driven aircraft benefit from the natural braking effect of the propeller when engine power is reduced to idle, but jet engines have no similar braking effect, so jet-powered aircraft must use air brakes to control speed and descent angle during landing approach. Many early jets used parachutes as air brakes on approach (Arado Ar 234, Boeing B-47) or after landing (English Electric Lightning).

Split-tailcone air brakes have been used on the Blackburn Buccaneer naval strike aircraft designed in the 1950s and Fokker F28 Fellowship and British Aerospace 146 airliners. The Buccaneer air brake, when opened, reduced the length of the aircraft in the confined space on an aircraft carrier.

The F-15 Eagle, Sukhoi Su-27, F-18 Hornet and other fighters have an air brake located just behind the cockpit.

== Split control surfaces ==
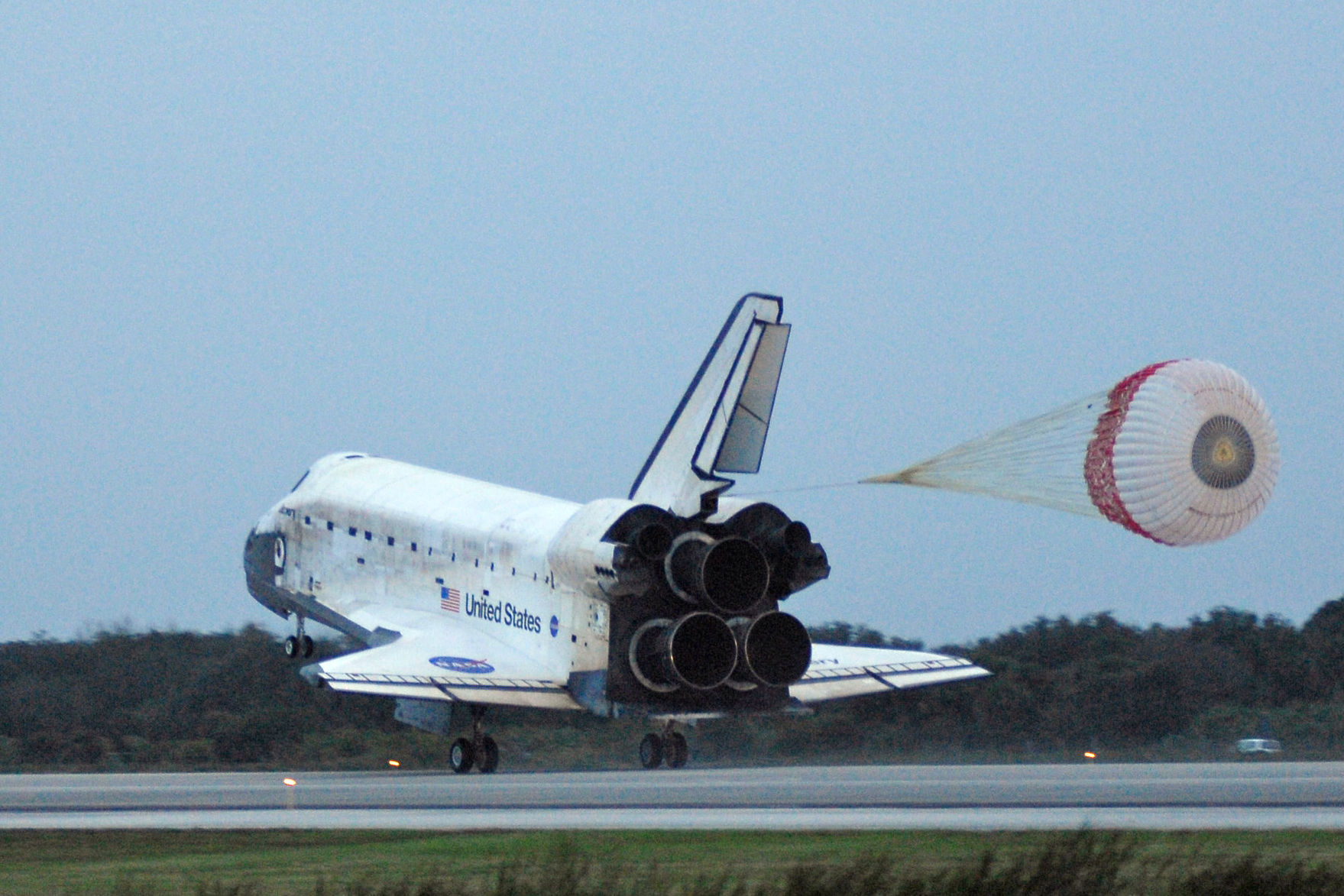
Space Shuttle Discovery on landing, showing its rudder deployed in speed brake mode

The deceleron is an aileron that functions normally in flight but can split in half such that the top half goes up as the bottom half goes down to brake. This technique was first used on the F-89 Scorpion and has since been used by Northrop on several aircraft, including the B-2 Spirit.

The Space Shuttle used a similar system. The vertically split rudder opened in "clamshell" fashion on landing to act as a speed brake.

== See also ==
- List of aircraft braking systems
- Drogue parachute
- Railway air brake
- Thrust reversal
