= Drogue parachute =

Parachute for high speed deployment

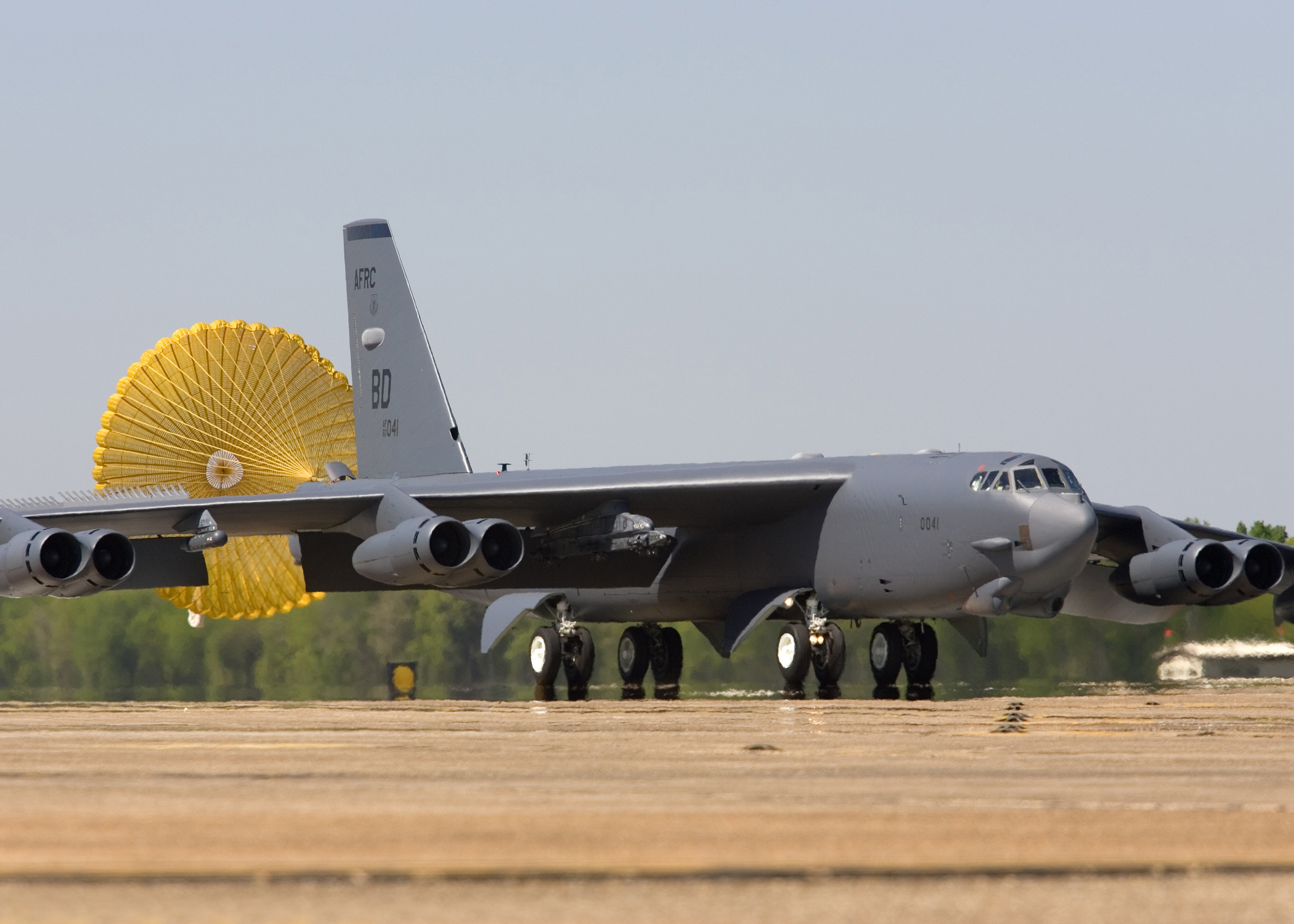
A Boeing B-52 Stratofortress from the 307th Bomb Wing deploying its drogue chute for landing

Drogue parachute deployed on a SAAF BAE Systems Hawk

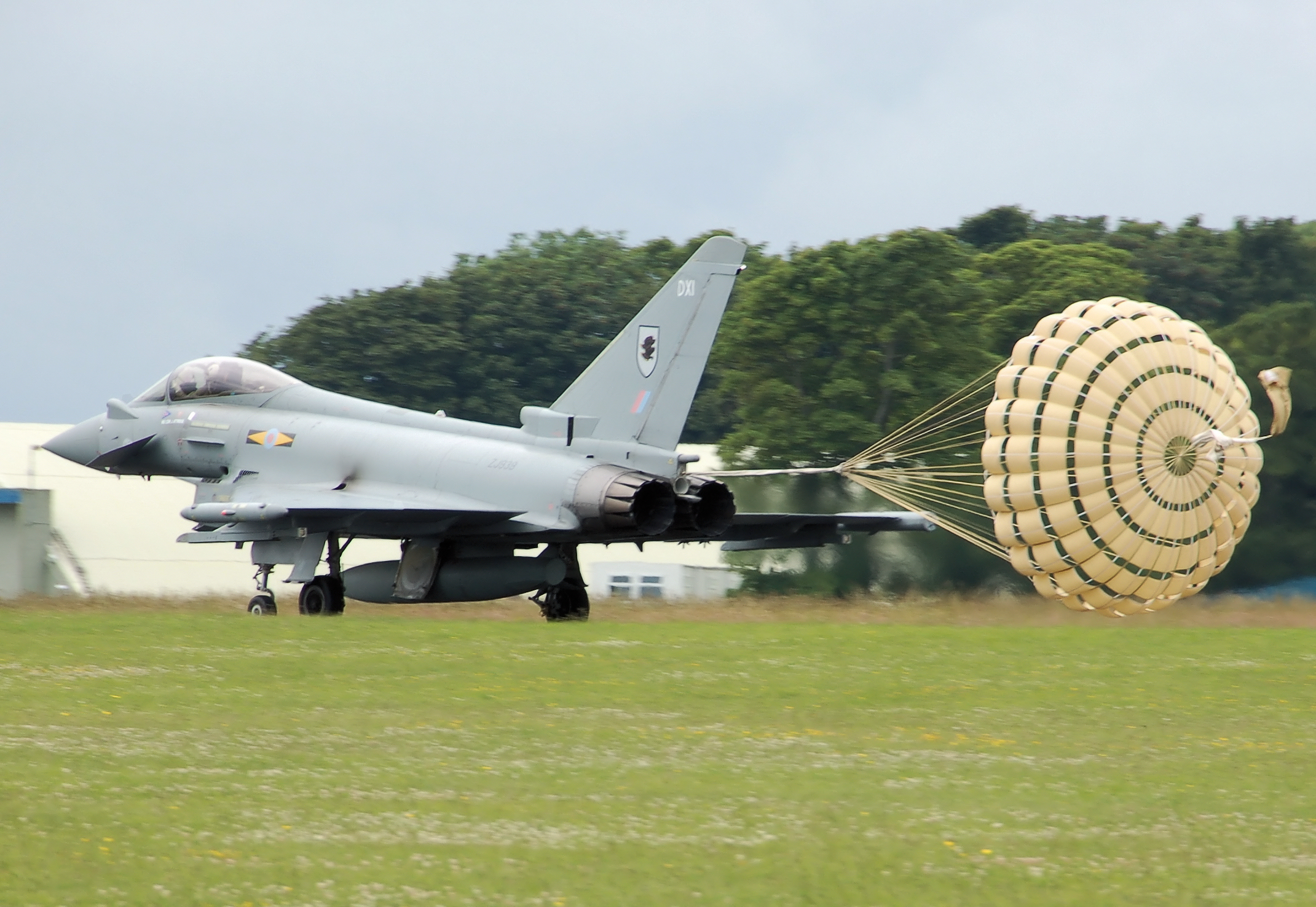
RAF Typhoon using a drogue parachute for extra braking after landing

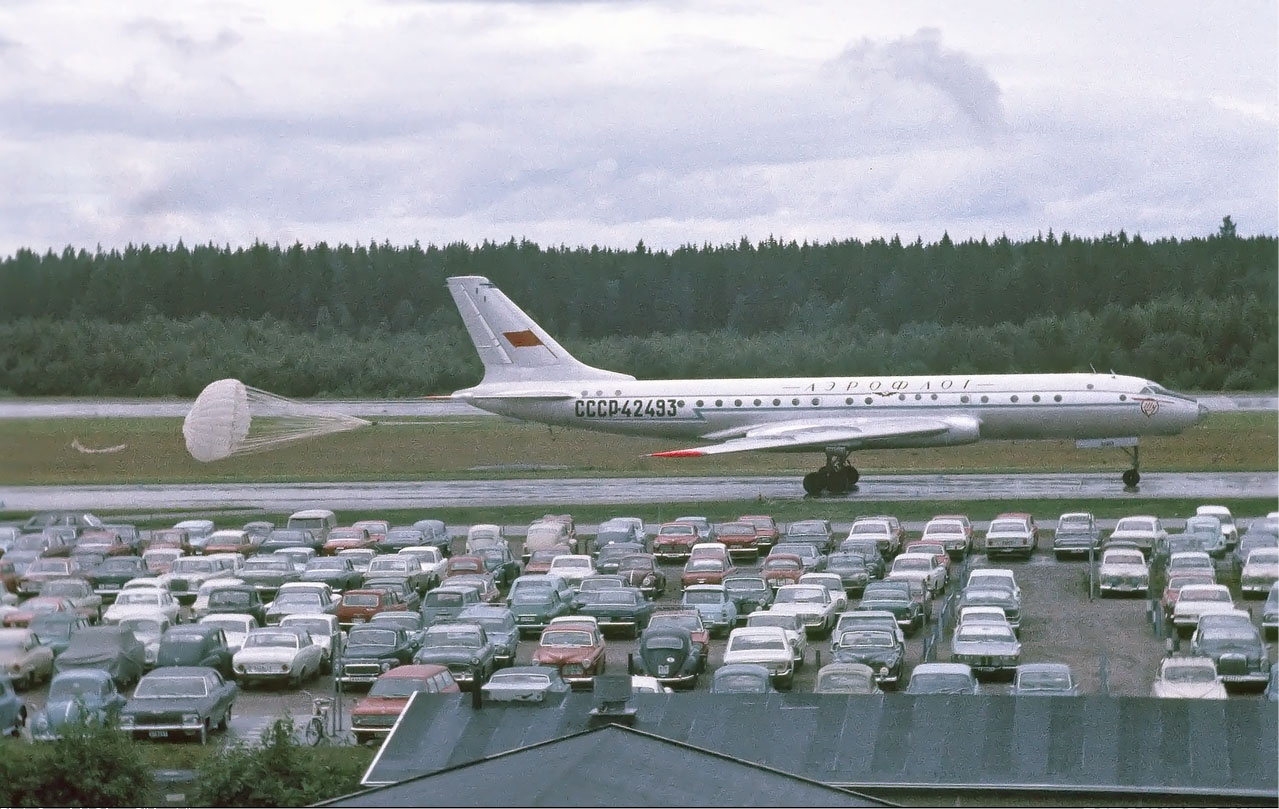
Aeroflot Tupolev Tu-104B at Arlanda Airport in 1968

A drogue parachute, also called a drag chute, is a parachute designed for deployment from a rapidly moving object. It can be used for various purposes, such as to decrease speed, to provide control and stability, as a pilot parachute to deploy a larger parachute or a combination of these. Vehicles that have used drogue parachutes include multistage parachutes, aircraft, and spacecraft recovery systems.

The drogue parachute was invented by Russian professor and parachute specialist Gleb Kotelnikov in 1912, who also invented the knapsack parachute. The Soviet Union introduced its first aircraft fitted with drogue parachutes during the mid 1930s; use of the technology expanded during and after the Second World War. A large number of jet-powered aircraft have been furnished with drogue parachutes, including the Boeing B-52 Stratofortress strategic bomber and the Eurofighter Typhoon multirole aircraft; they were also commonly used within crewed space vehicle recovery programmes, including Project Mercury and Project Gemini. The drogue parachute has also been extensively used upon ejection seats as a means of stabilisation and deceleration.

== History ==
The drogue parachute was first used during 1912 in a ground-based parachute test in the absence of airplanes, by Russian inventor Gleb Kotelnikov, who had patented an early canister-packed knapsack parachute a few months before this test. On a road near Tsarskoye Selo (now part of St. Petersburg), Kotelnikov successfully demonstrated the braking effects of such a parachute by accelerating a Russo-Balt automobile to its top speed and then opening a parachute attached to the back seat.

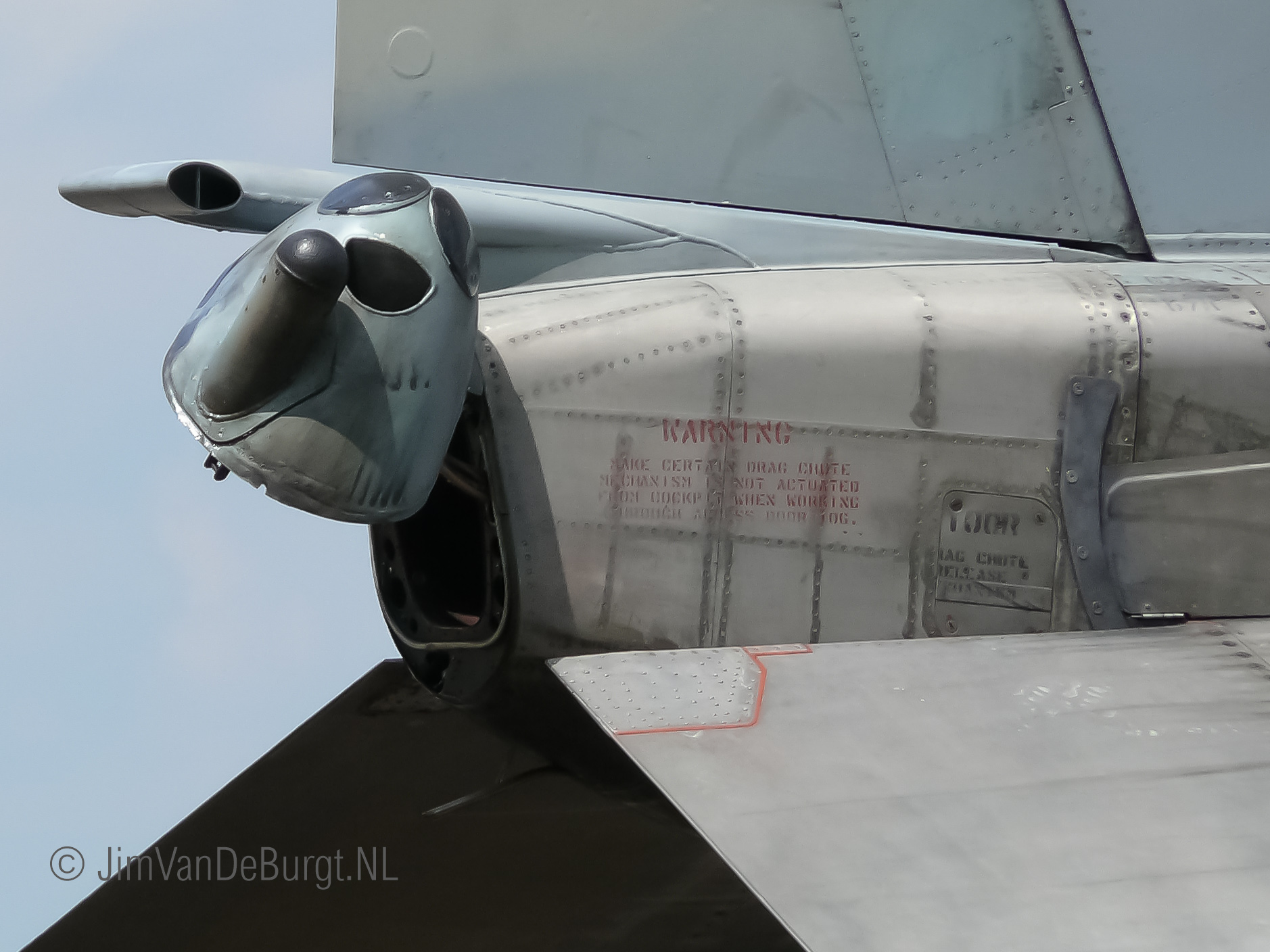
F-4 Phantom II drogue chute installation open, located at the tail of the aircraft

During 1937, the Soviet Union decided to adopt the drogue parachute for the first time on a limited number of their aircraft, specifically those assigned to operate within the Arctic to provide logistical support for the famous polar expeditions of the era, such as the first drifting ice stations North Pole-1, which was launched that same year. The drogue parachute was credited with enabling airplanes to land safely on smaller ice floes that were otherwise unfeasible landing sites.

One of the earliest production-standard military aircraft to use a drogue parachute to slow down and shorten its landings was the Arado Ar 234, a jet-powered reconnaissance-bomber used by the Luftwaffe. Both the trolley-and-skid undercarriage series of eight prototypes for the never-produced Ar 234A series — one on the aircraft, and a separate system on the aft surface of the trolley's main axle — and the tricycle undercarriage-equipped Ar 234B production series were fitted with a drogue parachute deployment capability in the extreme rear ventral fuselage.

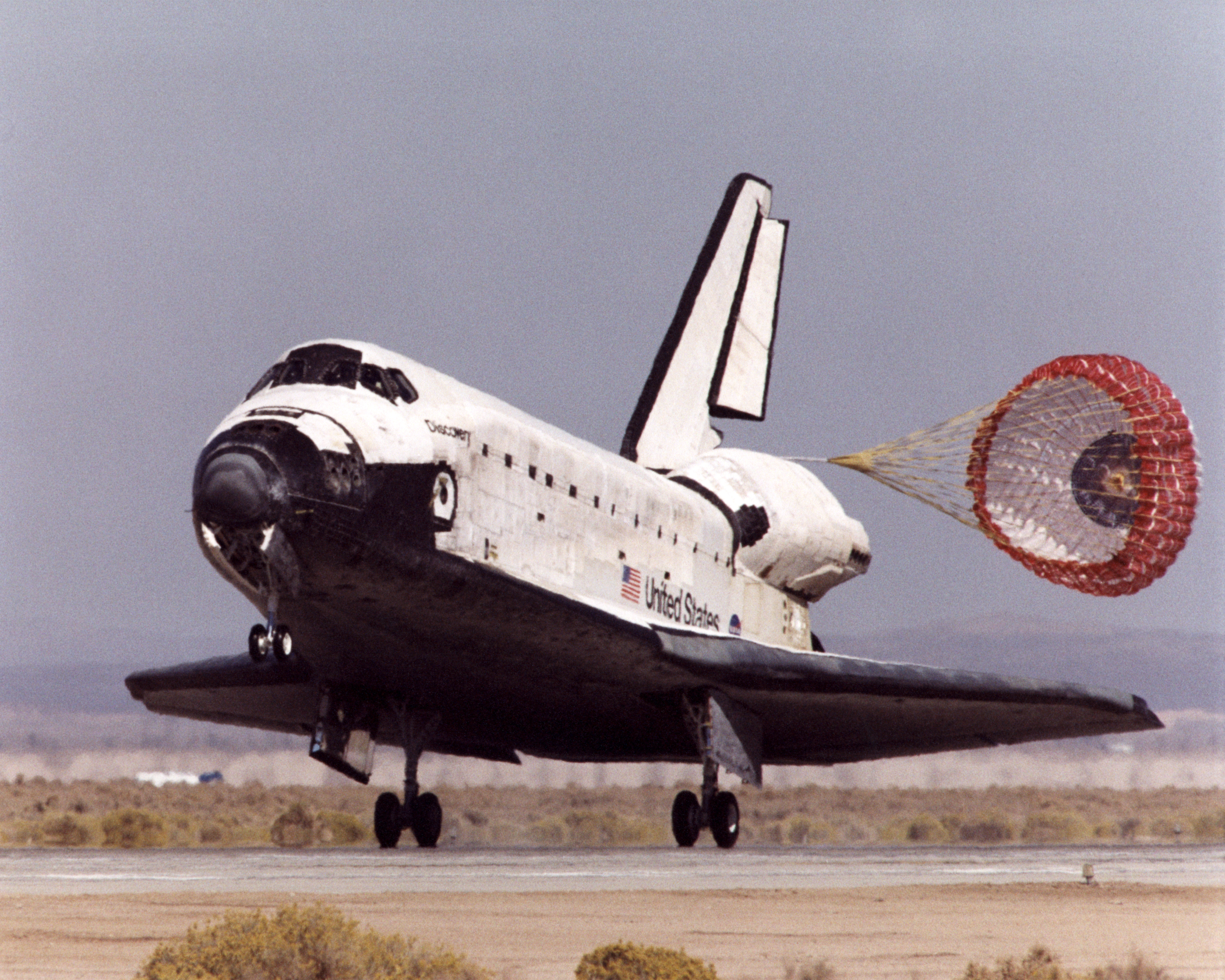
Space Shuttle Discovery lands with its drag chute (reefed to reduce deceleration loads)

During the space race between the United States and the Soviet Union, drogue parachutes were adopted on numerous spacecraft. All human space programs managed by NASA and the Soviets in that time, including Project Mercury and the Apollo program, employed drogue parachutes in their vehicle recovery systems alongside the larger main parachutes. The large budget granted to NASA at the time allowed for the extensive development of parachutes, also including drogues that were designed for deployment in extreme conditions and proved useful for interplanetary missions. The Space Shuttle, which landed on a runway, also found benefit in using a drag chute during landing. Its solid rocket boosters were also recovered with the help of drogue parachutes.

== Design and characteristics ==
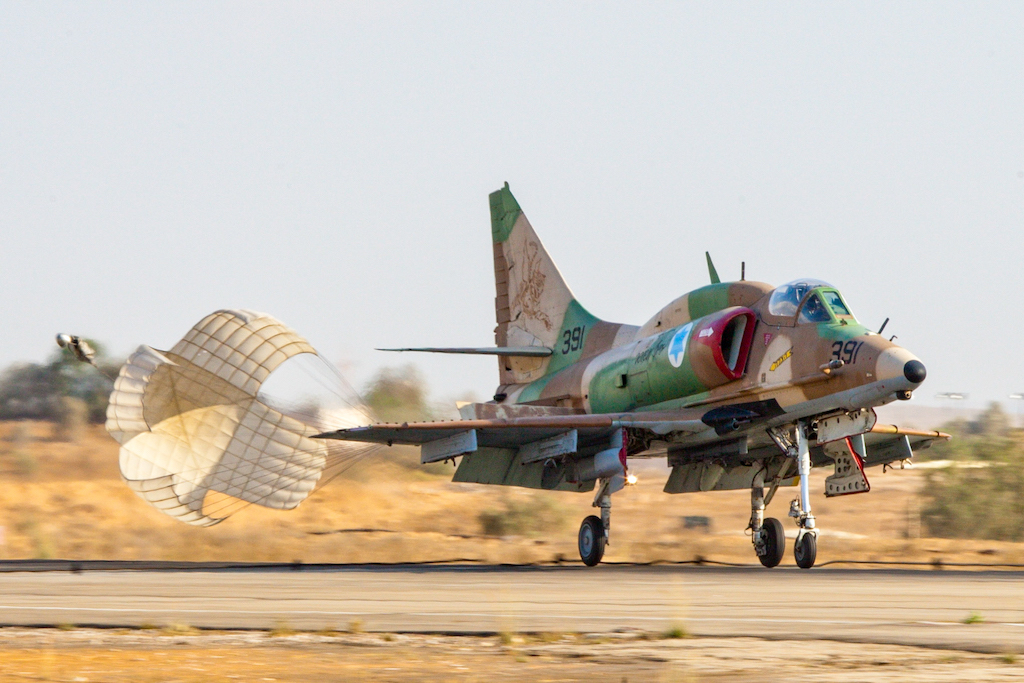
IAF A-4N Skyhawk landing with a cross-shaped drogue

In comparison to a conventional parachute, the drogue parachute is more elongated and has a far smaller surface area; as a result, it provides far less drag. The drogue parachute can be deployed at speeds at which conventional parachutes would be torn apart, although it will not slow an object as much as a conventional parachute would do. Due to its simpler design, the drogue parachute is also easier to deploy, minimizing the risk of becoming tangled while unfolding or failing to inflate properly.

== Use ==
=== Parachuting ===
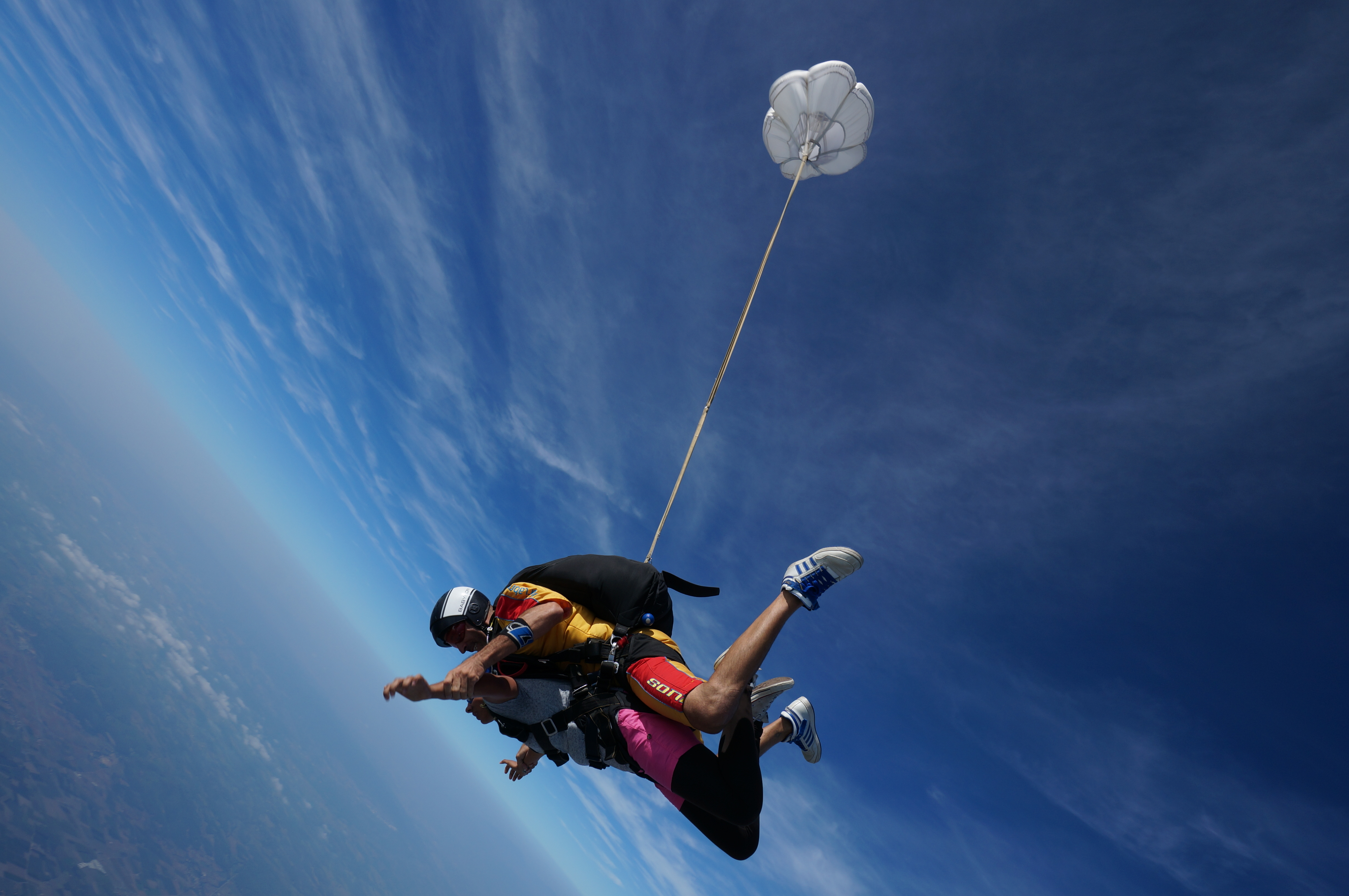
A drogue pilot chute decelerating a pair of tandem skydivers

Drogue parachutes are sometimes used to deploy a main or reserve parachute by using the drag generated by the drogue to pull the main parachute out of its container. Such a drogue is referred to as a pilot chute when used in a single user (sports) parachute system. The pilot chute is used only to deploy the main or reserve parachute; it is not used for slowing down or for stability. Tandem systems are different; a drogue is deployed shortly after exiting the aircraft to reduce the terminal velocity of the pair of tandem jumpers during freefall. It is later used to deploy the main parachute as on single-person parachutes.

Numerous innovations and improvements have been made to drogue parachutes intended for this purpose; examples include a patent for an antispinning feature granted during 1972, and improved force distribution granted in 2011.

=== Deceleration ===
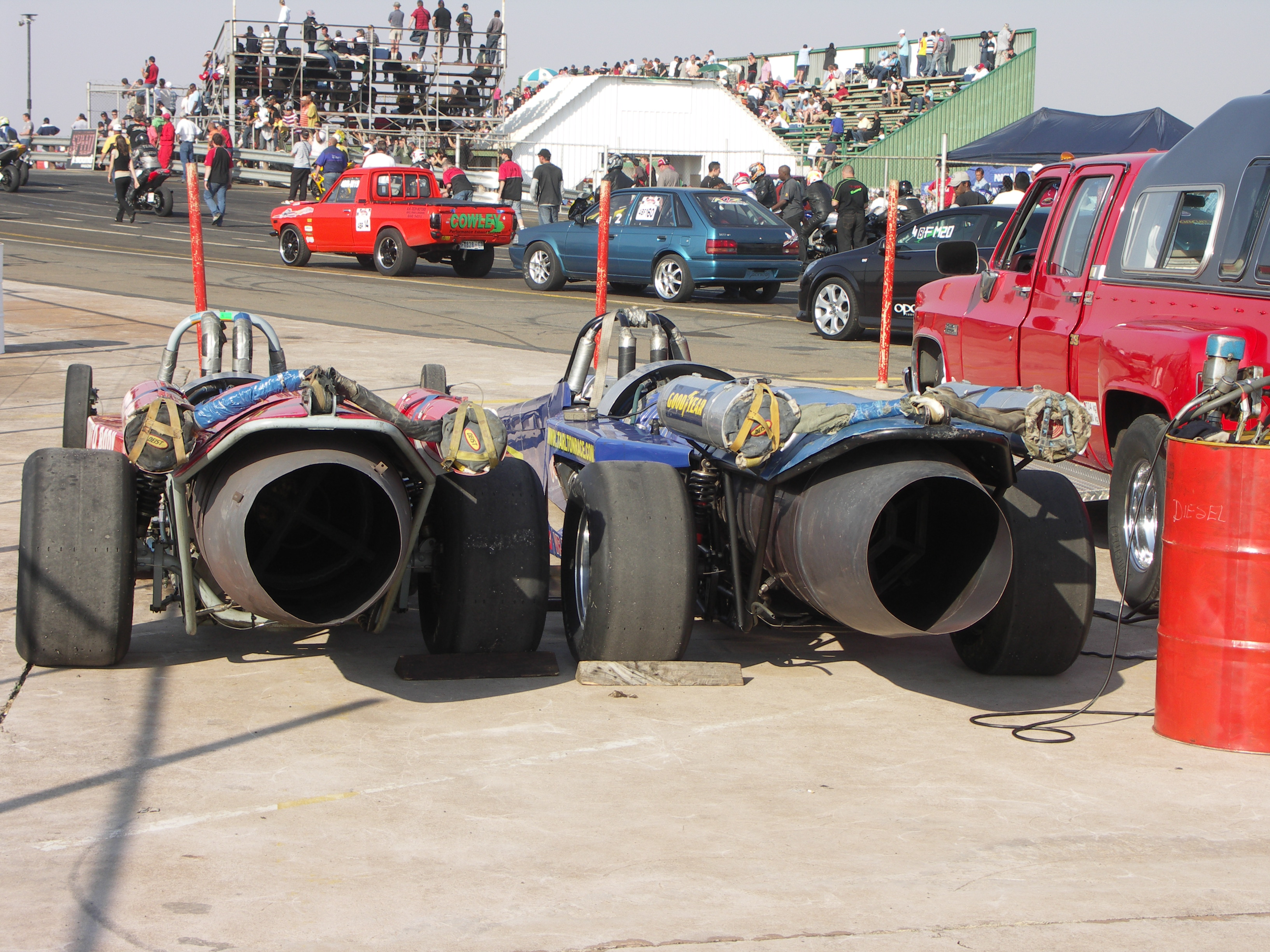
Dual braking parachutes fitted to jet dragsters: The parachutes are in the smaller tubes with yellow straps.

When used to shorten an aircraft's landing distance, a drogue chute is called a drag parachute or braking parachute. They remain effective for landings on wet or icy runways and for high-speed emergency landings.

Braking parachutes are also employed to slow down cars during drag racing; the National Hot Rod Association requires their installation on all vehicles able to attain speeds of 150 miles per hour or greater. They have also been installed on multiple experimental vehicles intended to conduct land speed record attempts.

=== Stability ===
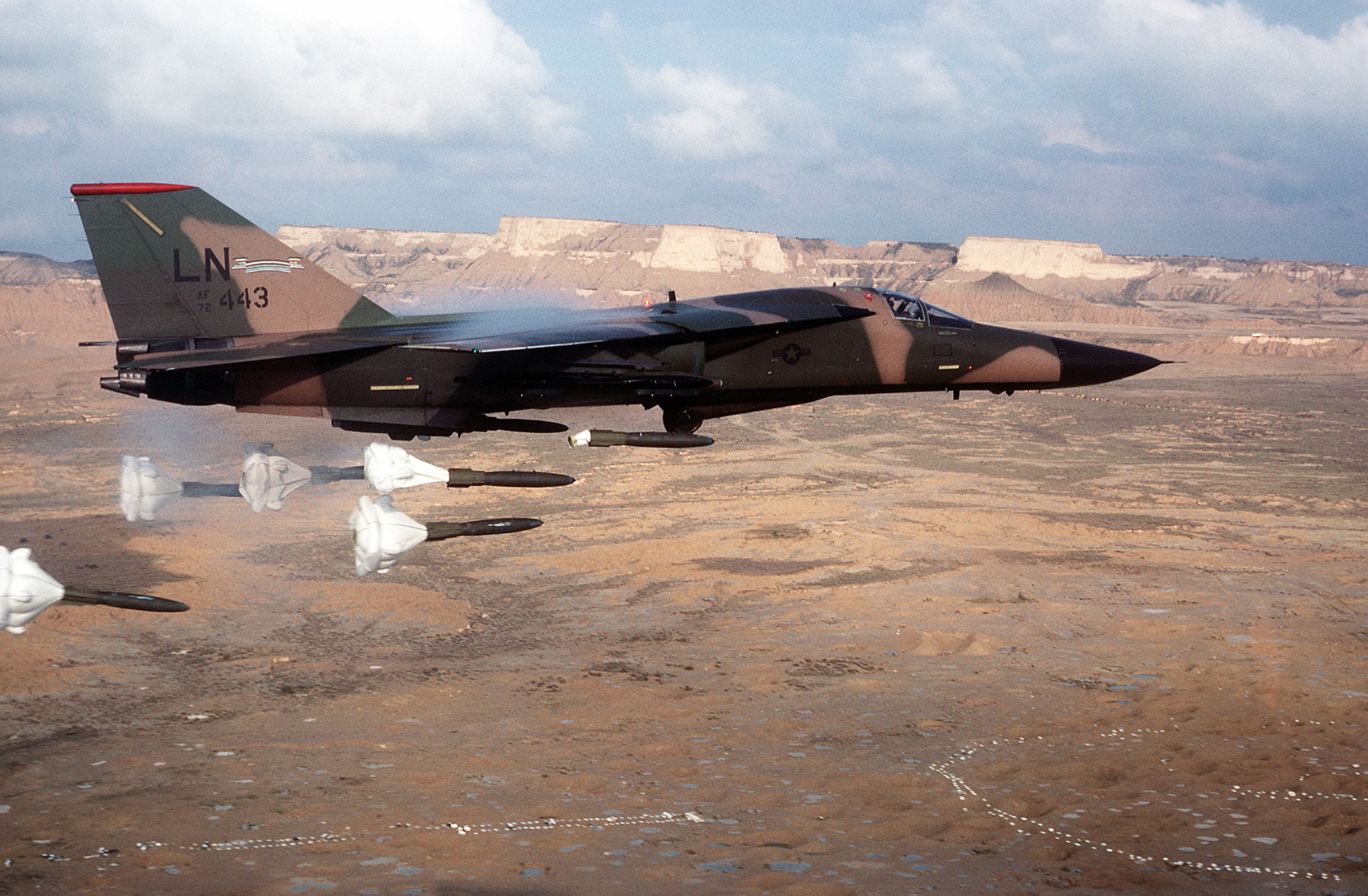
An F-111F dropping bombs with ballute drogues

Drogue parachutes may also be used to help stabilise direction of objects in flight, such as thrown RKG-3 anti-tank grenades or air-dropped bombs. Stall recovery parachutes are used to mitigate risk of uncontrollable spins during airworthiness flight testing. It has been used for similar purposes when applied to several nuclear bombs, such as the B61 and B83, slowing the weapon's descent to provide the aircraft that dropped it enough time to escape the nuclear blast.

Drogue parachutes have found use on ejection seats to both stabilise and to slow down almost immediately following deployment, examples include the ACES II personal escape system. Similarly, a number of escape capsules, used on both supersonic aircraft and spacecraft, have employed drogue parachutes both for stability and braking, allowing either a main chute to be deployed or for the pilot to exit the capsule and use a personal parachute.

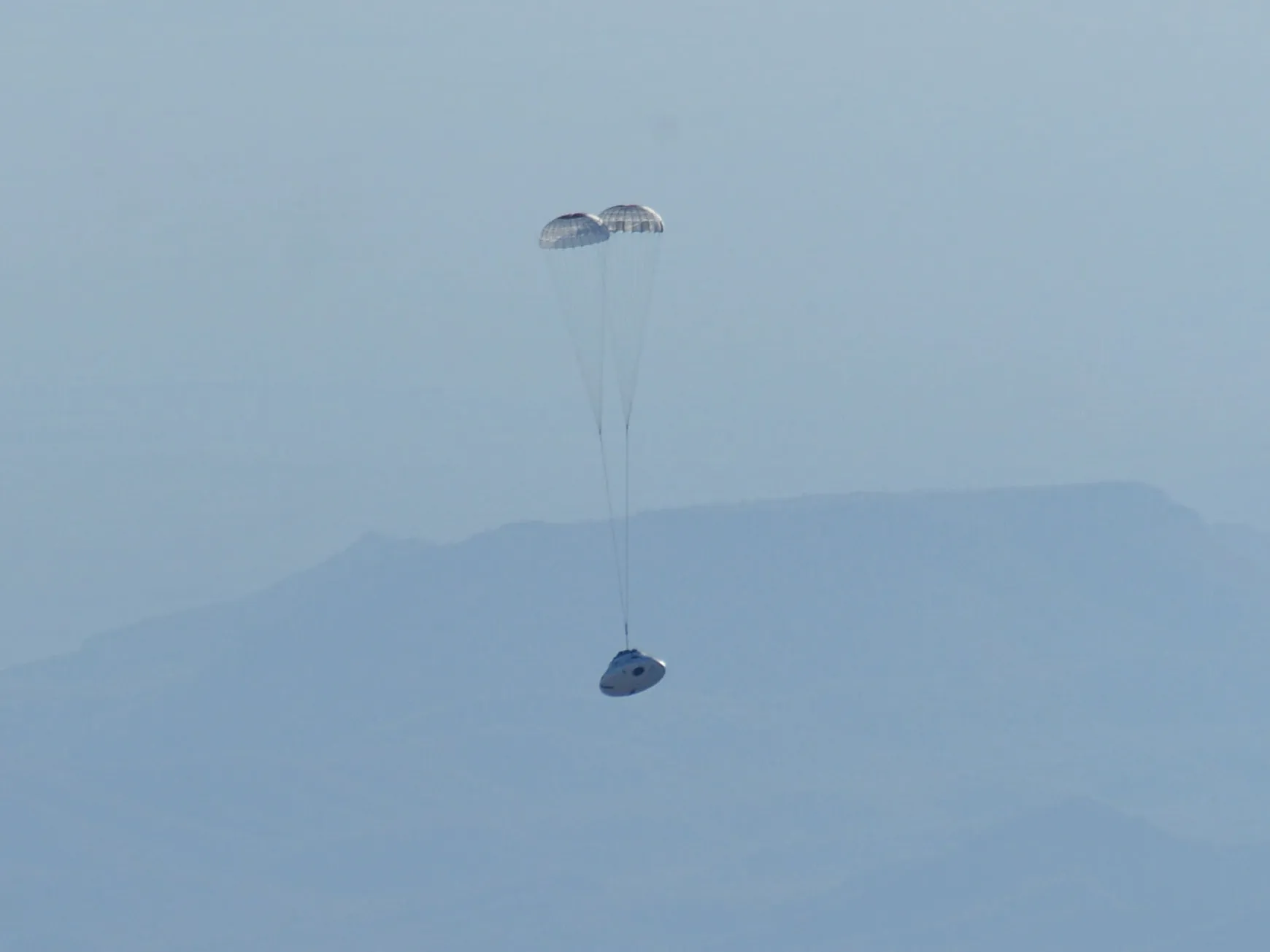
Drogue parachutes (seen during a drop test in 2014) are used to stabilise the Orion spacecraft before main parachute deployment

Drogue parachutes remain a key technology for spaceflight, because they can be used to gain control of very fast descents, including those of spacecraft during atmospheric entry. They are usually deployed until having established entry conditions that allow for the use of main parachutes or retropropulsion. These include the Boeing X-37 spaceplane, SpaceX Dragon capsules and fairing halves, Rocket Lab Electron first stages, ISRO's Gaganyaan modules and the Chang'e 5 re-entry craft. The Stardust and OSIRIS-REx sample return capsules and all successful Mars landing missions as of January 2024 used supersonic drogue parachutes. Some high-altitude rockets have also used drogue chutes as part of a dual-deployment system, subsequently deploying a main parachute to control and slow their descent.

== See also ==
- Air brake (aircraft)
- Drogue
- Sea anchor
