= Drogue =

Drag device streamed behind a vessel

A drogue with tripping line attached to the pointed end

A drogue or storm drogue is a device trailed behind a boat on a long line attached to the stern. A drogue is used to slow the boat down in a storm and to prevent the hull from becoming side-on to the waves. A boat that has deployed a drogue should not overspeed down the slope of a wave and crash into the next one, nor will the vessel broach. By slowing the vessel, the drogue makes the vessel easier to control in heavy weather and will help to prevent pitchpoling.

A drogue works by providing substantial resistance when dragged through the water. An alternative device is the sea anchor which is streamed from the bows. The advantage of the sea anchor is that the bows of a yacht are invariably finer for breaking through waves than the stern, thereby giving a safer and more comfortable experience in a storm.

Both drogues and sea anchors will have tripping lines to aid recovery of the drogue after deployment.

An alternative procedure during a storm is heaving to.

== Use ==
Most drogues are best deployed out of sync with the boat by one-half of the length of the prevailing waves; thus the drogue climbs a wave when the boat slides down a wave. Nylon rope is widely used for hauling drogues since it best absorbs the shock loading by stretching. However, new research indicates that using a rope with less stretch accompanied by chain weight helps to maintain a constant force on the deployment rode rendering storm drogue use more effective.

Weights such as chains may be employed to keep the drogue from breaching the surface of the water and skimming across the top. Besides, experienced boaters add a floating trip buoy so that the drogue can be deflated before recovery. The trip buoy line is a floating buoy attached to the top of the parachute cone which collapses the cone when pulled. In the case of series drogue lines, they are attached to the end of the line. Trip lines are especially helpful in series drogues because of their difficult recovery. Although the trip line concept is a derivative of the parachute sea anchor, evidence demonstrates that such a setup is not effective with the storm drogue.

While similar in design, the sea anchor is quite different in application from a drogue. The sea anchor is usually much larger, is intended to slow the vessel to a near-complete stop, and is usually deployed off the bow (front) of the boat so that end is presented to the oncoming waves.

== Speed-limiting variety ==
Speed-limiting drogues are single-element devices. They come in several varieties of canopy shapes that are circular like a big round basket. Some are built with solid fabric while others are open in design to permit water to flow through them more readily. Holes or strips are usually cut in the drogue for stability, to reduce loads on the material or both. Currently, the speed-limiting drogue is the most commonly used storm drogue with many designs available in the market place. Ace Sailmakers also makes Speed Reducing Jordan Series Drogues, typically 30% or so number of cones for standard Jordan Series Drogue.

== Series drogue ==
Retired aeronautical engineer Don Jordan tested what is now known as the series drogue, originally conceived and patented by E. J. Pagan and later patented by Sidelnikov in 1975; However, before his tests, numerous mariners had experimented with pulling several large drogues in series. Like Sidelnikov, Jordan expanded upon this idea and affixed a large number of small parachute drogues to a nylon rope with a weight at the end. A large number of smaller drogues results in there always being a drag force on the line; it does not have to be adjusted to be in phase with the waves as the drag is spread out over many waves. Because the drogue line is prevented from becoming slack there is no jerking or snapping of high loads on the line. This prevention reduces damage to deck fittings and reduces the chance of breakage. The number of small parachutes, the length and thickness of the line, and the size of the end weight are all matched to the displacement of the boat. Another key design feature is the V-bridle. The two attachments should be made at the outer corners of the transom with the lengths of the two bridle lines being 2.5 times the width between the attachment points. According to Jordan, special reinforcement is required for the bridle attachment since Jordan projects that force of 7,000 lb. to 27,000 lb. and even higher can occur with a breaking wave strike. With this deployment, no steering of any kind is needed.

The series drogue does not have to be adjusted during a storm. Neither do other storm drogues if they are fully deployed and they adhere to the constant rode tension theory. As sea conditions requiring a drogue are usually hazardous to be on deck, it’s usually smart to fully deploy all of the rode associated with a storm drogue. Also, the series drogue can be deployed safely with one hand from the cockpit as can any other storm drogue. Recovering a series drogue before the storm abates takes effort, but the process is safe and straightforward. It can be winched in on sheet winches if the cones are small enough to travel around the winch drum without jamming. The series drogue is currently made by three manufacturers, one in Australia, one in the United States and one in the United Kingdom. Any sailmaker can make one and you can make one yourself, though it is a tedious job.

== Improvised drogues ==
Studies undertaken by the U.S. Coast Guard have indicated that drogues made of old tires, long lengths of chain, etc. are not effective in slowing most vessels. Old tires may skim along the surface at storm speeds. Extremely long lengths of chain are required for any appreciable drag effect from the chain alone. Nevertheless, these drogues continue to be used.

== Aviation ==
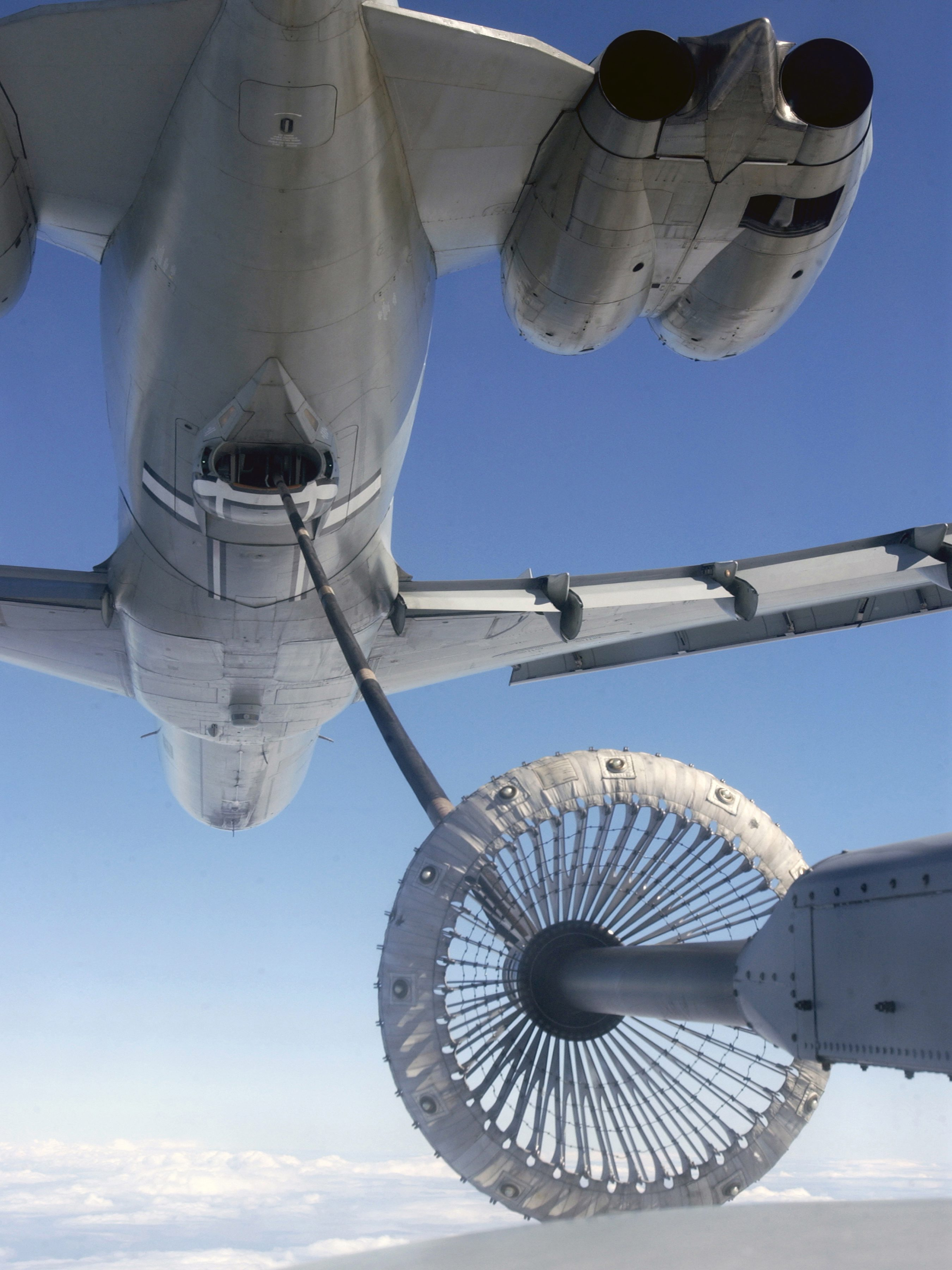
An aerial drogue used for in-flight refuelling.

In aviation, Drogues are used for devices used in Aerial refuelling.

== In fiction ==
In Hornblower in the West Indies by C. S. Forester, a drogue is secretly made up at night by Hornblower's crew and covertly attached to the rudder of a slave ship to slow it down after it leaves its safe harbor the following morning. This is to allow Hornblower's ship to overtake the otherwise faster slaver and free its captives. This particular drogue is made of sail canvas and weighted by a spare bobstay chain.

In Moby-Dick, Herman Melville describes the use of wooden "druggs" attached to lances, which whaling crews use to slow down whales for later pursuit and capture.

== See also ==
- Anchor – Device used to secure a vessel to the seabed
- Heaving to – Way of slowing a sailing vessel's forward progress
- Mooring – Structure for securing floating vessels
- Sea anchor – Drag device used to stabilize a boat in heavy weather and reduce drift
- Seakeeping – Response of a vessel to sea conditions
- Seamanship – Art, competence, and knowledge of operating a craft on water
