= Lying ahull =

Method of weathering a storm at sea

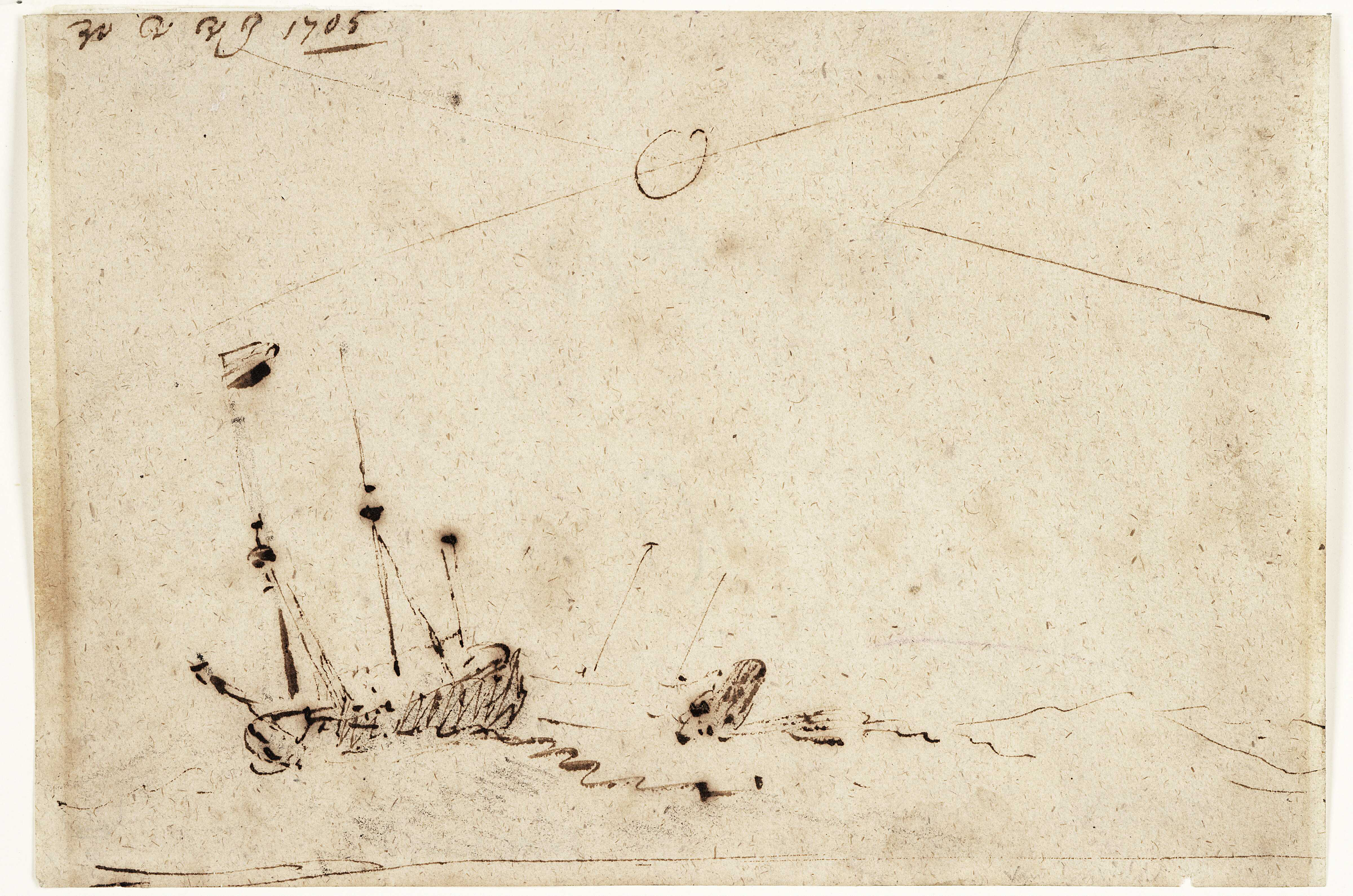
1705 drawing by Willem van de Velde the Younger of two ships lying ahull in a heavy sea

In sailing, lying ahull is a controversial method of weathering a storm, executed by downing all sails, battening the hatches and locking the tiller to leeward.

== Operation ==
Diagram showing a sail boat lying ahull

The boat tries to point to windward but this is balanced by the force of wind and waves. A sea anchor is not used, allowing the boat to drift freely, completely at the mercy of the storm. Ideally the boat should rest with the wind just forward of the beam so the boat is not broadside onto the waves. Modern boats with fin keels may have too much windage at the bows for this technique and come to rest broadside on or may not be stable at all.

== Sources ==
- Heaving-to: Heavy weather sailing, 1990, by George Day, Blue Water Sailing, archived 2006
