= Sea anchor =

Drag device used to stabilize a boat in heavy weather and reduce drift

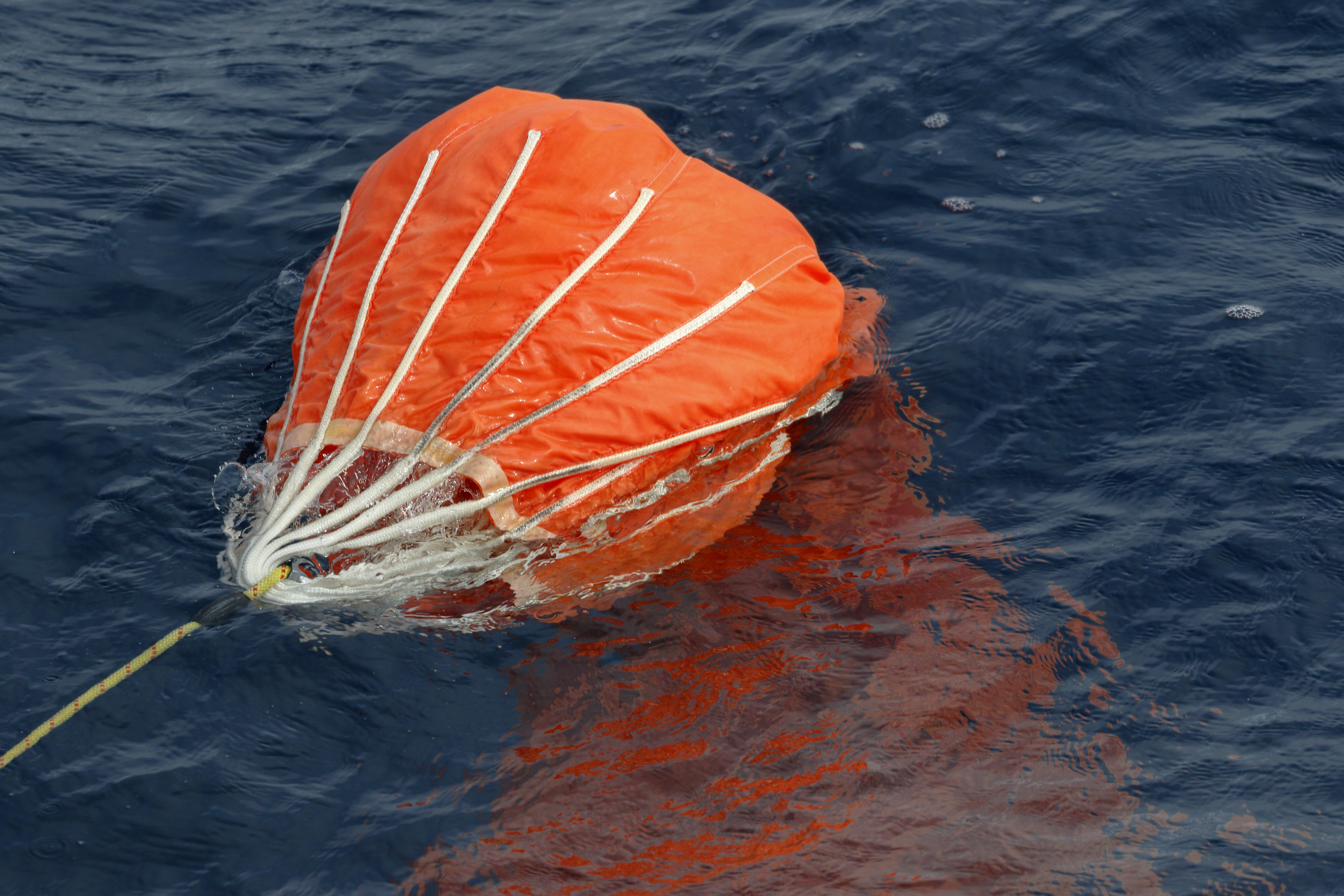
A parachute sea anchor deployed

A sea anchor (also known as a parachute anchor, drift anchor, drift sock, para-anchor or boat brake) is a device that is streamed from a boat in heavy weather. Its purpose is to stabilize the vessel and to limit progress through the water. Rather than tethering the boat to the seabed with a conventional anchor, a sea anchor provides hydrodynamic drag, thereby acting as a brake. Normally attached to a vessel's bows, a sea anchor can prevent the vessel from turning broadside to the waves and being overwhelmed by them.

Early sea anchors were crude devices, but today most take the form of a drogue parachute. Larger sea anchors are so efficient that they need a tripping line to collapse the parachute for retrieval. Being made of fabric, a sea parachute may be bagged and easily stowed when not in use.

A similar device to the sea anchor is the much smaller drogue, which is streamed from a vessel's stern in strong winds so as to slow the boat to prevent pitchpoling or broaching in an overtaking sea. The fundamental difference between the sea anchor and the drogue is that the drogue will slow the boat while keeping the heading steady, and is intended to be launched from the stern. The parachute anchor is designed to be launched from the bow and effectively stop the boat's progress relative to the current in an open sea.

== Design ==
A conical sea anchor with tripline (from an illustration in The Sailors Handbook by Halsey C. Herreshoff)

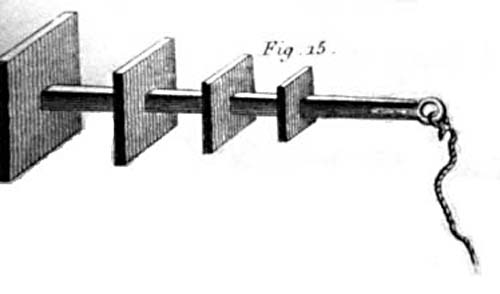
An early wooden drogue

Anything that can act as a source of sufficient stable drag in the water can act as a sea anchor; a common improvised drag device is a long line (a docking warp or anchor rope) payed out into the water; while this does not provide much drag, it can act as a drogue and aid in running downwind. Adding items to increase drag can convert this to a sea anchor. A (floating) bucket tied to the end of the line works as a basic sea anchor. In The Sea-Wolf, author and sailor Jack London described using various broken spars and sails, tied to a line, as an improvised sea anchor. A sail, weighed down with an anchor chain or other heavy object, will also work as an improvised sea anchor.

Early sea anchors were often improvised from spare parts aboard ship. An 1877 book used by the United States Naval Academy describes methods of making sea anchors. These took the form of a wooden or metal framework forming a simple kite-like shape of sail canvas, backed with a net or closely spaced ropes to provide strength. A small anchor attached to one corner kept the sea anchor from twisting. If the framework was wooden, the wood's buoyancy kept the sea anchor just under the surface, while an iron framework used a buoy to keep it at the proper depth.

Modern commercial sea anchors are usually made of cloth, shaped like a parachute or cone, and rigged so that the wider end leads and the narrower end trails. When deployed, this type of sea anchor floats just under the surface, and the water moving past the sea anchor keeps it filled. Some varieties are cylindrical, with an adjustable opening in the rear that allows the amount of braking to be adjusted when deployed.

The size of the sea anchor determines how much water it can displace, and how much braking it can provide. It is also possible to use more than one sea anchor to increase the braking.

The 'series drogue' is a drogue (not a sea anchor) that allows the operator to increase or decrease the resistance by laying out more or less of a line with many small drag devices spread out along a line - this also serves to ease retrieval under heavy conditions.

Most larger sea anchors will provide a mechanism to collapse the anchor for retrieval. This is called a trip line, and attaches to the rear of the anchor, allowing it to be pulled in back first, shedding water rather than filling. This trip line can be rigged a number of ways, depending on the preference of the user.

== Use ==
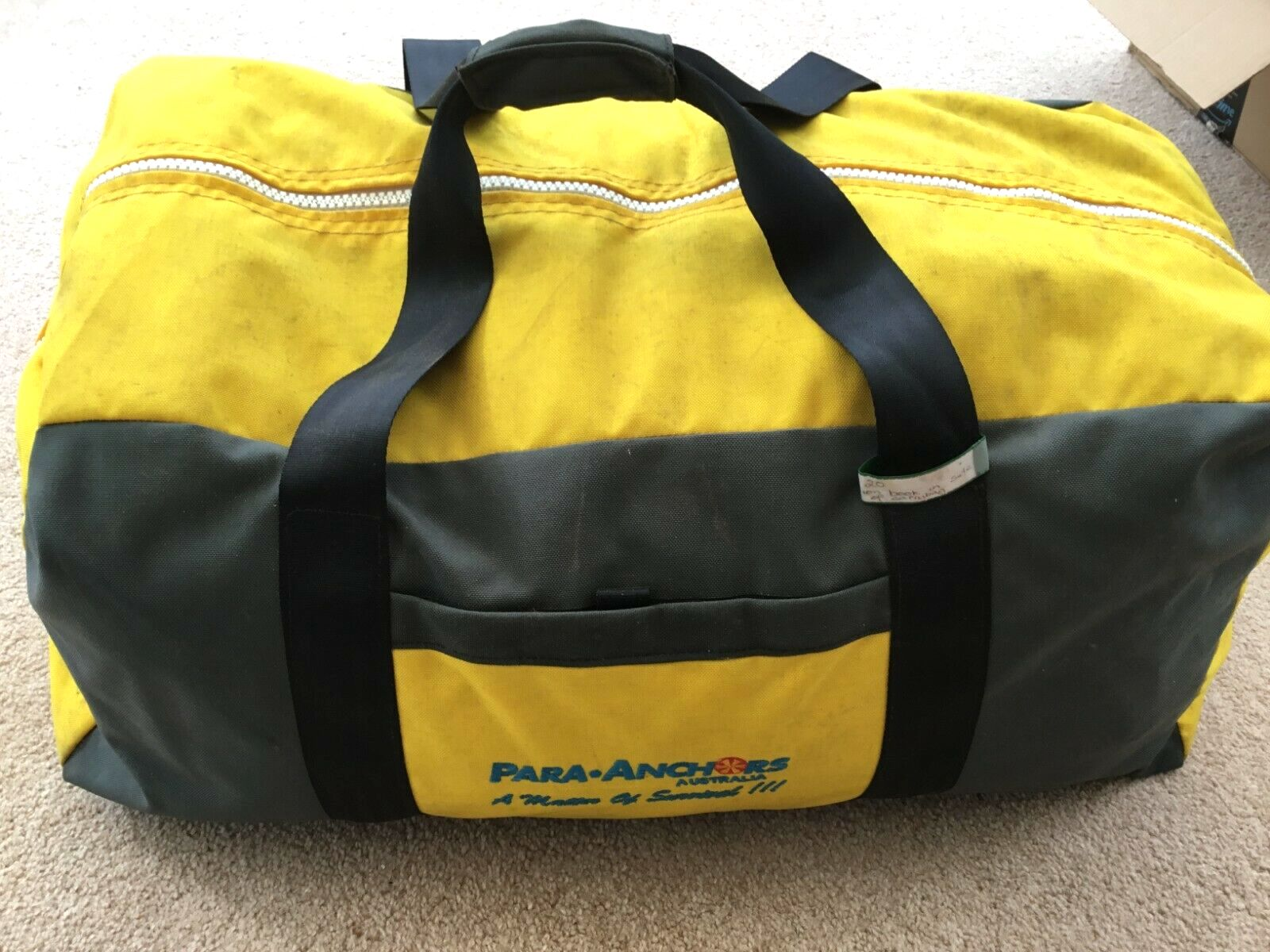
A marine parachute anchor bagged up, ready for use in a large yacht

Sea anchors can be used by vessels of any size, from kayaks to commercial fishing vessels, and were even used by sea-landing naval Zeppelins in World War I. While the purpose of the anchor is to provide drag to slow the vessel, there are a number of ways this can be used:

- The first use of the sea anchor is as an aid to vessels in heavy weather. A boat that is not kept bow-on or stern-on to heavy seas can more easily be rolled by the action of breaking waves. By attaching the sea anchor to a bridle running from bow to stern, the boat can be held at any angle relative to the wind. This is useful in sailboats in conditions too windy to use the sails to maintain a heading, and in motor vessels that are unable to make sufficient headway to maintain steerage.
- Sea anchors also reduce the speed at which a vessel will drift with the wind. Often sold as drift anchors or drift socks, sea anchors are used in fishing vessels to hold them stationary relative to the water to allow a certain area to be fished, without having to use the motor.
- Sea anchors may also be used as anchors to allow warping of a vessel in deep water.

The length and type of the line, or rope, used to attach the sea anchor to the bow is also important. In addition to connecting the sea anchor to the hull, the rope also acts as a shock absorber. The stretching of the rope under load will smooth out the changes in loading caused by the changing force of the waves interacting with the hull of the vessel. Because a high degree of stretch is desirable in this application, a material with a low elastic modulus is preferred, such as nylon. If there is no concern about breaking waves and the only reason the sea anchor is being used is to reduce drift from the wind, then a short rope may be used. If short rope is used on large ocean swells, its length should be tuned to the wavelength of the waves; either under 1/3 of the wavelength or an integer multiple of the wavelength. A line significantly shorter than the wavelength means the anchor and hull will ride over the crests together, while a line equal to the wavelength will keep the hull and anchor from ending up out of phase, which can result in severe loading on the anchor. In stormy seas, and when breaking waves are a concern, it is important to not tune the rope length to the waves, so that the anchor and boat are not rolled by the same wave or by adjacent waves. The ability to absorb shock is even more important. Under these conditions, a rope as much as 10 to 15 times the length of the hull should be used to provide a high degree of shock absorption.

== See also ==
- Anchor – Device used to secure a vessel to the seabed
- Drogue – Drag device streamed behind a vessel
- Heaving to – Way of slowing a sailing vessel's forward progress
- Mooring – Structure for securing floating vessels
- Seakeeping – Response of a vessel to sea conditions
- Seamanship – Art, competence, and knowledge of operating a craft on water

== Bibliography ==
- Lehmann, Ernst A.; Mingos, Howard. "VI The North Sea Patrol — The Zeppelins at Jutland". The Zeppelins. The Development of the Airship, with the Story of the Zeppelin Air Raids in the World War. Archived from the original on 2008-11-21.(online chapter)
- Roth, Hal (2008). Handling Storms at Sea: the five secrets of heavy weather sailing. International Marine, McGraw Hill. ISBN 978-0-07-149648-3.
