= Aircraft records =

This article gives yearly aviation records under 5 headings: airspeed, range, ceiling, gross take-off weight, and engine power.

Year	Airspeed	Range	Ceiling	T/O Weight	Engine power
1905	60.91 km/h (37.85 mph); USA; Wilbur Wright; Flyer III; October 5, 1905	38.95 km (24.2 miles); USA; Wilbur Wright; Flyer III; October 5, 1905	15 m (50 ft); USA; Wilbur Wright; Flyer III; September 28, 1905	388 kg (855 lb); USA; Wright Brothers; Flyer III	37 kW (50 hp); France; Léon Levavasseur; Antoinette
1907	60.91 km/h (37.85 mph); USA; Wilbur Wright; Flyer III; October 5, 1905	38.95 km (24.2 miles); USA; Wilbur Wright; Flyer III; October 5, 1905	25 m (82 ft); France; Louis Blériot; Blériot VI; September 17, 1907	522 kg (1,151 lb); France; Voisin Brothers; Voisin-Farman No 1	40 kW (54 hp); France; Renault; VB Renault
1908	64.79 km/h (40.26 mph); France; Henry Farman; Voisin-Farman No 1 October 30, 1908	124.69 km (77.48 miles); USA; Wilbur Wright; Wright A December 31, 1908	110 m (361 ft); USA; Wilbur Wright; Wright A December 18, 1908	544 kg (1,200 lb); USA; Wilbur Wright; Wright A	59 kW (79 hp); France; Gobron-Brille; Gobron
1909	76.96 km/h (47.82 mph); France; Louis Blériot; Blériot XII; August 28, 1909	234.21 km (145.53 miles); France; Henry Farman; HF.1 No III; December 1, 1909	453 m (1,486 ft); France; Hubert Latham; Antoinette VII; December 1, 1909	620 kg (1,367 lb); France; Louis Blériot; Blériot XII	66 kW (89 hp); France; Gobron-Brille; Gobron
1910	110 km/h (68.2 mph); France; Alfred Leblanc; Blériot XI; October 29, 1910	584.7 km (363.34 miles); France; Maurice Tabuteau; Maurice-Farman; December 30, 1910	3,100 m (10,170 ft); France; Georges Legagneux; Hubert Latham; Antoinette VII; December 1, 1909	1,322 kg (2,950 lb); Great Britain; Samuel Cody; Cody Michelin Cup	132 kW (177 hp); France; Clerget; Gobron
1911	141.2 km/h (87.73 mph); France; Édouard Nieuport; Nieuport Nie-2 N June 21, 1911	740 km (460 miles); France; Armand Gobé; Nieuport; December 24, 1911	3,910 m (12,828 ft); France; Roland Garros; Blériot XI; September 4, 1911	1,350 kg (2,976 lb); France; Léon Levavasseur; Antoinette Monobloc	132 kW (177 hp); France; Clerget; Double Clerget 4W
1912	174.1 km/h (108.18 mph); France; Jules Védrines; Deperdussin Monocoque; September 9, 1912	1,010.89 km (628.14 miles); France; Géo Fourny; Maurice Farman; September 11, 1912	5,610 m (18,405 ft); France; Roland Garros; Morane-Saulnier; December 11, 1912	1,350 kg (2,976 lb); France; Léon Levavasseur; Antoinette Monobloc	147 kW (197 hp); France; Clerget; Clerget
1913	203.8 km/h (126.66 mph); France; Maurice Prévost; Deperdussin Monocoque; September 29, 1913	1,021.19 km (634.54 miles); France; A Seguin; Henry Farman; October 13, 1913	6,120 m (20,079 ft); France; Georges Legagneux; Nieuport II N December 28, 1913	4,080 kg (8,995 lb); Russia; Igor Sikorsky; Russian Knight	162 kW (217 hp); France; Salmson Canton-Unné (CU) 2M7
1914	216.5 km/h (134.54 mph); Great Britain; Norman Spratt; RAF SE.4; June 1914	1,900 km (1,180.61 miles); Germany; Werner Landmann; Albatros; June 28, 1914	8,150 m (26,739 ft); Germany; Heinrich Oelerich; DFW; July 14, 1914	4,800 kg (10,582 lb); Russia; Igor Sikorsky; Ilya Muromets A	168 kW (225 hp); Great Britain; Sunbeam
1915	216.5 km/h (134.54 mph); Great Britain; Norman Spratt; RAF SE.4; June 1914	1,900 km (1,180.61 miles); Germany; Werner Landmann; Albatros; June 28, 1914	8,150 m (26,739 ft); Germany; Heinrich Oelerich; DFW; July 14, 1914	6,350 kg (14,000 lb); Great Britain; Handley Page Ltd; Handley Page 0/100	169 kW (227 hp); France; Louis Renault; Renault 12A
1916	216.5 km/h (134.54 mph); Great Britain; Norman Spratt; RAF SE.4; June 1914	1,900 km (1,180.61 miles); Germany; Werner Landmann; Albatros; June 28, 1914	8,150 m (26,739 ft); Germany; Heinrich Oelerich; DFW; July 14, 1914	12,129 kg (26,739 lb); Germany; Staaken; R.VI	296 kW (296 hp); France; Louis Renault; Renault 12F
1917	216.5 km/h (134.54 mph); Great Britain; Norman Spratt; RAF SE.4; June 1914	1,900 km (1,180.61 miles); Germany; Werner Landmann; Albatros; June 28, 1914	8,150 m (26,739 ft); Germany; Heinrich Oelerich; DFW; July 14, 1914	12,955 kg (28,561 lb); Germany; Staaken; R.VII	298 kW (400 hp); USA; Packard & Hall Scott; Liberty
1918	262.4 km/h (163.06 mph); USA; Roland Rohlfs; Curtiss Wasp; August 19, 1918	1,900 km (1,180.61 miles); Germany; Werner Landmann; Albatros; June 28, 1914	8,808 m (28,897 ft); USA; Rudolph Schroeder; Bristol F.2B; November 18, 1918	15,900 kg (35,053 lb); Germany; Staaken; R.XIVa	522 kW (700 hp); Italy; Fiat; Fiat A.14
1919	307.5 km/h (191.1 mph); France; Joseph Sadi-Lecointe; Nieuport-Delage 29v December 16, 1919	3,032 km (1,884 miles); Great Britain; Alcock and Brown; Vickers Vimy; June 15, 1919	10,549 m (34,610 ft); USA; Roland Rohlfs; Curtiss Wasp; September 18, 1919	20,263 kg (44,672 lb); Great Britain; WG Tarrant Ltd; Tarrant Tabor	522 kW (700 hp); Italy; Fiat; Fiat A.14
1920	313 km/h (194.49 mph); France; Joseph Sadi-Lecointe; Nieuport-Delage 29v December 12, 1920	3,032 km (1,884 miles); Great Britain; Alcock and Brown; Vickers Vimy; June 15, 1919	10,549 m (34,610 ft); USA; Roland Rohlfs; Curtiss Wasp; September 18, 1919	20,263 kg (44,672 lb); Great Britain; WG Tarrant Ltd; Tarrant Tabor	522 kW (700 hp); Italy; Fiat; Fiat A.14
1921	330 km/h (205.22 mph); France; Joseph Sadi-Lecointe; Nieuport-Delage; September 26, 1921	3,032 km (1,884 miles); Great Britain; Alcock and Brown; Vickers Vimy; June 15, 1919	10,549 m (34,610 ft); USA; Roland Rohlfs; Curtiss Wasp; September 18, 1919	26,000 kg (57,319 lb); Italy; SAI Caproni; Caproni Ca 60	625 kW (838 hp); France; Marcel Riffard; Breguet-Bugatti 32A
1922	361 km/h (224.28 mph); USA; William Mitchell; Curtiss R-6; October 18, 1922	4,052 km (2517.8 miles); USA; Oakley G. Kelly and John A. Macready; Fokker T-2; October 6, 1922	10,549 m (34,610 ft); USA; Roland Rohlfs; Curtiss Wasp; September 18, 1919	26,000 kg (57,319 lb); Italy; SAI Caproni; Caproni Ca 60	625 kW (838 hp); France; Marcel Riffard; Breguet-Bugatti 32A
1923	430 km/h (267.16 mph); USA; Alford J Williams; Curtiss R2C-1; November 4, 1923	5,300 km (3,293 miles); USA; Smith and Richter; De Havilland DH.4B; August 28, 1923	11,145 m (36,565 ft); France; Joseph Sadi-Lecointe; Nieuport-Delage; October 30, 1923	26,000 kg (57,319 lb); Italy; SAI Caproni; Caproni Ca 60	625 kW (838 hp); France; Marcel Riffard; Breguet-Bugatti 32A
1924	448 km/h (278.47 mph); France; Florentine Bonnet; Bernard Ferbois V2; December 11, 1924	5,300 km (3,293 miles); USA; Smith and Richter; De Havilland DH.4B; August 28, 1923	11,145 m (36,565 ft); France; Joseph Sadi-Lecointe; Nieuport-Delage; October 30, 1923	26,000 kg (57,319 lb); Italy; SAI Caproni; Caproni Ca 60	746 kW (1,000 hp); Great Britain; Napier; Cub
1925	448 km/h (278.47 mph); France; Florentine Bonnet; Bernard Ferbois V2; December 11, 1924	5,300 km (3,293 miles); USA; Smith and Richter; De Havilland DH.4B; August 28, 1923	11,145 m (36,565 ft); France; Joseph Sadi-Lecointe; Nieuport-Delage; October 30, 1923	26,000 kg (57,319 lb); Italy; SAI Caproni; Caproni Ca 60	746 kW (1,000 hp); Great Britain; Napier; Cub
1926	448 km/h (278.47 mph); France; Florentine Bonnet; Bernard Ferbois V2; December 11, 1924	5,396 km (3,352.92 miles); France; Costes and Rignot; Breguet 19 GR; October 19, 1926	11,145 m (36,565 ft); France; Joseph Sadi-Lecointe; Nieuport-Delage; October 30, 1923	26,000 kg (57,319 lb); Italy; SAI Caproni; Caproni Ca 60	746 kW (1,000 hp); Great Britain; Napier; Cub
1927	479 km/h (297.83 mph); Italy; Mario de Bernardi; Macchi M.52; November 4, 1927	6,294 km (3,911 miles); USA; Chamberlin and Levine; Bellanca; June 6, 1927	11,710 m (38,418 ft); USA; CC Champion; Wright Apache; July 25, 1927	26,000 kg (57,319 lb); Italy; SAI Caproni; Caproni Ca 60	746 kW (1,000 hp); Great Britain; Napier; Cub
1928	513 km/h (318.57 mph); Italy; Mario de Bernardi; Macchi M.52bis; March 30, 1928	7,665.3 km (4,763.81 miles); Italy; Arturo Ferrarin and Carlo del Prete; SIAI-Marchetti S.64; July 5, 1928	11,710 m (38,418 ft); USA; CC Champion; Wright Apache; July 25, 1927	26,000 kg (57,319 lb); Italy; SAI Caproni; Caproni Ca 60	746 kW (1,000 hp); Great Britain; Napier; Cub
1929	583 km/h (362 mph); Italy; Giuseppe Motta; Macchi M.67; August 22, 1929	8,029.4 km (4,989.26 miles); France; D. Costes and P.Codos; Breguet 19; December 17, 1929	12,739 m (41,795 ft); Germany; Willi Neuenhofen; Junkers W 34; May 26, 1929	56,000 kg (123,457 lb); Germany; Dornier; Dornier Do X	1,119 kW (1,500 hp); Great Britain; Rolls-Royce; Rolls-Royce R
1930	583 km/h (362 mph); Italy; Giuseppe Motta; Macchi M.67; August 22, 1929	8,188.8 km (5,088.28 miles); Italy; Maddalena and Cecconi; SIAI-Marchetti S.M.64bis; June 2, 1930	13,157 m (43,166 ft); USA; Apollo Soucek; Wright Apache; June 4, 1930	56,000 kg (123,457 lb); Germany; Dornier; Dornier Do X	1,119 kW (1,500 hp); Great Britain; Rolls-Royce; Rolls-Royce R
1931	655 km/h (406.94 mph); Great Britain; GH Stainforth; Supermarine S.6B; September 29, 1931	10,371 km (6,444.27 miles); France; Le Brix and Doret; Dewoitine D-33; June 10, 1931	13,157 m (43,166 ft); USA; Apollo Soucek; Wright Apache; June 4, 1930	56,000 kg (123,457 lb); Germany; Dornier; Dornier Do X	2,280 kW (3,058 hp); Italy; Fiat; Fiat AS.6
1932	655 km/h (406.94 mph); Great Britain; GH Stainforth; Supermarine S.6B; September 29, 1931	10,601.5 km (6,587.45 miles); France; Bossoutrot and Rossi; Blériot 110; March 26, 1932	13,404 m (43,976 ft); Great Britain; Cyril F Uwins; Vickers Vespa; September 16, 1932	56,000 kg (123,457 lb); Germany; Dornier; Dornier Do X	2,280 kW (3,058 hp); Italy; Fiat; Fiat AS.6
1933	682 km/h (423.82 mph); Italy; Francesco Agello; Macchi-Castoldi MC-72; April 18, 1933	10,601.5 km (6,587.45 miles); France; Bossoutrot and Rossi; Blériot 110; March 26, 1932	13,660 m (44,816 ft); France; Gustave Lemoine; Potez 50; September 28, 1933	56,000 kg (123,457 lb); Germany; Dornier; Dornier Do X	2,280 kW (3,058 hp); Italy; Fiat; Fiat AS.6
1934	709 km/h (440.68 mph); Italy; Francesco Agello; Macchi-Castoldi MC-72; October 23, 1934	10,601.5 km (6,587.45 miles); France; Bossoutrot and Rossi; Blériot 110; March 26, 1932	14,432 m (47,352 ft); Italy; Renato Donati; Caproni Ca 113 AQ; April 11, 1934	56,000 kg (123,457 lb); Germany; Dornier; Dornier Do X	2,280 kW (3,058 hp); Italy; Fiat; Fiat AS.6
1935	709 km/h (440.68 mph); Italy; Francesco Agello; Macchi-Castoldi MC-72; October 23, 1934	10,601.5 km (6,587.45 miles); France; Bossoutrot and Rossi; Blériot 110; March 26, 1932	14,575 m (47,818 ft); USSR; Vladimir Kokkinaki; Polikarpov TsKB-3 (I-15); November 21, 1935	56,000 kg (123,457 lb); Germany; Dornier; Dornier Do X	2,280 kW (3,058 hp); Italy; Fiat; Fiat AS.6
1936	709 km/h (440.68 mph); Italy; Francesco Agello; Macchi-Castoldi MC-72; October 23, 1934	10,601.5 km (6,587.45 miles); France; Bossoutrot and Rossi; Blériot 110; March 26, 1932	15,223 m (49,944 ft); Great Britain; S.R. Swain; Bristol 138; September 28, 1936	56,000 kg (123,457 lb); Germany; Dornier; Dornier Do X	2,280 kW (3,058 hp); Italy; Fiat; Fiat AS.6
1937	709 km/h (440.68 mph); Italy; Francesco Agello; Macchi-Castoldi MC-72; October 23, 1934	10,601.5 km (6,587.45 miles); France; Bossoutrot and Rossi; Blériot 110; March 26, 1932	16,440 m (53,937 ft); Great Britain; MJ Adam; Bristol 138	56,000 kg (123,457 lb); Germany; Dornier; Dornier Do X	2,280 kW (3,058 hp); Italy; Fiat; Fiat AS.6
1938	709 km/h (440.68 mph); Italy; Francesco Agello; Macchi-Castoldi MC-72; October 23, 1934	11,650 km (7,239 miles); Japan; Takahashi and Sekine; Gasuden Koken; May 16, 1938	17,083 m (56,046 ft); Italy; Mario Pezzi; Caproni 161bis October 22, 1938	56,000 kg (123,457 lb); Germany; Dornier; Dornier Do X	2,280 kW (3,058 hp); Italy; Fiat; Fiat AS.6
1939	755 km/h (469.22 mph); Germany; Fritz Wendel; Messerschmitt Me 209 V1; April 26, 1939	12,936 km (8,038 miles); Italy; Tondi, Degasso, Vignoli; Savoia-Marchetti S.M.75; August 1, 1939	17,083 m (56,046 ft); Italy; Mario Pezzi; Caproni 161bis October 22, 1938	56,000 kg (123,457 lb); Germany; Dornier; Dornier Do X	544 kgf thrust (1,200 lbf thrust); Germany; Pabst von Ohain; Heinkel HeS 3B
1940	755 km/h (469.22 mph); Germany; Fritz Wendel; Messerschmitt Me 209 V1; April 26, 1939	12,936 km (8,038 miles); Italy; Tondi, Degasso, Vignoli; Savoia-Marchetti S.M.75; August 1, 1939	17,083 m (56,046 ft); Italy; Mario Pezzi; Caproni 161bis October 22, 1938	56,000 kg (123,457 lb); Germany; Dornier; Dornier Do X	544 kgf thrust (1,200 lbf thrust); Germany; Pabst von Ohain; Heinkel HeS 3B
1941	1,004 km/h km/h (623.85 mph); Germany; Heini Dittmar; Messerschmitt Me 163A; October 2, 1941	12,936 km (8,038 miles); Italy; Tondi, Degasso, Vignoli; Savoia-Marchetti S.M.75; August 1, 1939	17,083 m (56,046 ft); Italy; Mario Pezzi; Caproni 161bis October 22, 1938	56,000 kg (123,457 lb); Germany; Dornier; Dornier Do X	748 kgf thrust (1,650 lbf thrust); Germany; Walter HWK; R11
1942	1,004 km/h km/h (623.85 mph); Germany; Heini Dittmar; Messerschmitt Me 163A; October 2, 1941	12,936 km (8,038 miles); Italy; Tondi, Degasso, Vignoli; Savoia-Marchetti S.M.75; August 1, 1939	17,083 m (56,046 ft); Italy; Mario Pezzi; Caproni 161bis October 22, 1938	63,500 kg (140,000 lb); USA; Boeing; Boeing XB-29 Superfortress	910 kgf thrust (2,006 lbf thrust); Germany; Junkers Motoren; Jumo 004 B
1943	1,004 km/h km/h (623.85 mph); Germany; Heini Dittmar; Messerschmitt Me 163A; October 2, 1941	12,936 km (8,038 miles); Italy; Tondi, Degasso, Vignoli; Savoia-Marchetti S.M.75; August 1, 1939	17,083 m (56,046 ft); Italy; Mario Pezzi; Caproni 161bis October 22, 1938	75,500 kg (166,447 lb); Germany; Junkers; Junkers Ju 390	1,700 kgf thrust (3,748 lbf thrust); Germany; Walter HWK; 109-509 A-2
1944	1,004 km/h km/h (623.85 mph); Germany; Heini Dittmar; Messerschmitt Me 163A; October 2, 1941	12,936 km (8,038 miles); Italy; Tondi, Degasso, Vignoli; Savoia-Marchetti S.M.75; August 1, 1939	17,083 m (56,046 ft); Italy; Mario Pezzi; Caproni 161bis October 22, 1938	94,339 kg (207,981 lb); Germany; Blohm & Voss; Blohm & Voss V238 V1	2,000 kgf thrust (4,410 lbf thrust); Germany; Walter HWK; 109-509 C
1945	1,004 km/h km/h (623.85 mph); Germany; Heini Dittmar; Messerschmitt Me 163A; October 2, 1941	12,936 km (8,038 miles); Italy; Tondi, Degasso, Vignoli; Savoia-Marchetti S.M.75; August 1, 1939	17,083 m (56,046 ft); Italy; Mario Pezzi; Caproni 161bis October 22, 1938	94,339 kg (207,981 lb); Germany; Blohm & Voss; Blohm & Voss V238 V1	2,000 kgf thrust (4,410 lbf thrust); Germany; Walter HWK; 109-509 C
1946	1,004 km/h km/h (623.85 mph); Germany; Heini Dittmar; Messerschmitt Me 163A; October 2, 1941	18,081 km (11,235 miles); USA; Thomas D Davies; Lockheed P2V-1 Neptune; October 1, 1946	17,083 m (56,046 ft); Italy; Mario Pezzi; Caproni 161bis October 22, 1938	140,614 kg (310,000 lb); USA; Convair; Convair XB-36	2,722 kgf thrust (6,000 lbf thrust); USA; Reaction Motors Inc; XLR 11-RM-5
1947	1,434 km/h (891.07 mph); USA; Charles "Chuck" Yeager; Bell X-1; November 6, 1947	18,081 km (11,235 miles); USA; Thomas D Davies; Lockheed P2V-1 Neptune; October 1, 1946	17,083 m (56,046 ft); Italy; Mario Pezzi; Caproni 161bis October 22, 1938	181,437 kg (400,000 lb); USA; Hughes Aircraft Co; H-4 Hercules	2,722 kgf thrust (6,000 lbf thrust); USA; Reaction Motors Inc; XLR 11-RM-5
1948	1,540 km/h (957 mph); USA; Charles Yeager; Bell X-1; March 26, 1948	18,081 km (11,235 miles); USA; Thomas D Davies; Lockheed P2V-1 Neptune; October 1, 1946	19,507 m (64,000 ft); USA; Charles Yeager; Bell X-1; May 26, 1948	181,437 kg (400,000 lb); USA; Hughes Aircraft Co; H-4 Hercules	2,740 kgf thrust (6,041 lbf thrust); USSR; Klimov; Klimov VK-1
1949	1,540 km/h (957 mph); USA; Charles Yeager; Bell X-1; March 26, 1948	37,165 km (23,093 miles); USA; James Gallagher; Boeing B-50A; March 2, 1949	21,916 m (71,902 ft); USA; Frank Everest; Bell X-1; August 8, 1949	181,437 kg (400,000 lb); USA; Hughes Aircraft Co; H-4 Hercules	2,948 kgf thrust (6,500 lbf thrust); Great Britain; Rolls-Royce; Rolls-Royce Avon 100
1950	1,540 km/h (957 mph); USA; Charles Yeager; Bell X-1; March 26, 1948	37,165 km (23,093 miles); USA; James Gallagher; Boeing B-50A; March 2, 1949	21,916 m (71,902 ft); USA; Frank Everest; Bell X-1; August 8, 1949	181,437 kg (400,000 lb); USA; Hughes Aircraft Co; H-4 Hercules	3,969 kgf thrust (8,750 lbf thrust); USA; Pratt & Whitney; Pratt & Whitney J48-P-5
1951	1,997 km/h (1,240.89 mph); USA; William Bridgeman; Douglas D-558-2; August 7, 1951	37,165 km (23,093 miles); USA; James Gallagher; Boeing B-50A; March 2, 1949	24,230 m (79,494 ft); USA; William Bridgeman; Douglas D-558-2; August 15, 1951	181,437 kg (400,000 lb); USA; Hughes Aircraft Co; H-4 Hercules	4,400 kgf thrust (9,700 lbf thrust); USA; Pratt & Whitney; Pratt & Whitney J57-P-3
1952	1,997 km/h (1,240.89 mph); USA; William Bridgeman; Douglas D-558-2; August 7, 1951	37,165 km (23,093 miles); USA; James Gallagher; Boeing B-50A; March 2, 1949	24,230 m (79,494 ft); USA; William Bridgeman; Douglas D-558-2; August 15, 1951	190,509 kg (420,000 lb); USA; Boeing; B-52A Stratofortress	4,400 kgf thrust (9,700 lbf thrust); USA; Pratt & Whitney; Pratt & Whitney J57-P-3
1953	2,655 km/h (1,650 mph); USA; Charles Yeager; Bell X-1A; December 12, 1953	37,165 km (23,093 miles); USA; James Gallagher; Boeing B-50A; March 2, 1949	25,376 m (83,253 ft); USA; Marion Carl; Douglas D-558-2; August 21, 1953	190,509 kg (420,000 lb); USA; Boeing; B-52A Stratofortress	8,700 kgf thrust (19,181 lbf thrust); USSR; Mikulin; Mikulin AM-3D
1954	2,655 km/h (1,650 mph); USA; Charles Yeager; Bell X-1A; December 12, 1953	37,165 km (23,093 miles); USA; James Gallagher; Boeing B-50A; March 2, 1949	27,566 m (90,440 ft); USA; Arthur Murray; Bell X-1A; August 26, 1954	190,509 kg (420,000 lb); USA; Boeing; B-52A Stratofortress	9,500 kgf thrust (20,945 lbf thrust); USSR; Mikulin; Mikulin AM-3M
1955	2,655 km/h (1,650 mph); USA; Charles Yeager; Bell X-1A; December 12, 1953	37,165 km (23,093 miles); USA; James Gallagher; Boeing B-50A; March 2, 1949	27,566 m (90,440 ft); USA; Arthur Murray; Bell X-1A; August 26, 1954	190,509 kg (420,000 lb); USA; Boeing; B-52A Stratofortress	10,000 kgf thrust (22,047 lbf thrust); USSR; Lyulka; Lyulka AL-7F TRD-31
1956	3,370 km/h (2,094 mph); USA; Milburn Apt; Bell X-2; September 27, 1956	37,165 km (23,093 miles); USA; James Gallagher; Boeing B-50A; March 2, 1949	38,376 m (125,907 ft); USA; Iven Kincheloe; Bell X-2; September 7, 1956	204,117 kg (450,000 lb); USA; Boeing; B-52C Stratofortress	10,000 kgf thrust (22,047 lbf thrust); USSR; Lyulka; Lyulka AL-7F TRD-31
1957	3,370 km/h (2,094 mph); USA; Milburn Apt; Bell X-2; September 27, 1956	39,147 km (24,325 miles); USA; Archie Old Jr; B-52B Stratofortress; January 18, 1957	38,376 m (125,907 ft); USA; Iven Kincheloe; Bell X-2; September 7, 1956	204,117 kg (450,000 lb); USA; Boeing; B-52C Stratofortress	12,251 kgf thrust (27,008 lbf thrust); USSR; Lyulka; Lyulka AL-21F
1958	3,370 km/h (2,094 mph); USA; Milburn Apt; Bell X-2; September 27, 1956	39,147 km (24,325 miles); USA; Archie Old Jr; B-52B Stratofortress; January 18, 1957	38,376 m (125,907 ft); USA; Iven Kincheloe; Bell X-2; September 7, 1956	221,353 kg (488,000 lb); USA; Boeing; B-52G Stratofortress	12,251 kgf thrust (27,008 lbf thrust); USSR; Lyulka; Lyulka AL-21F
1959	3,370 km/h (2,094 mph); USA; Milburn Apt; Bell X-2; September 27, 1956	39,147 km (24,325 miles); USA; Archie Old Jr; B-52B Stratofortress; January 18, 1957	38,376 m (125,907 ft); USA; Iven Kincheloe; Bell X-2; September 7, 1956	221,353 kg (488,000 lb); USA; Boeing; B-52G Stratofortress	12,251 kgf thrust (27,008 lbf thrust); USSR; Lyulka; Lyulka AL-21F
1960	3,534 km/h (2,196 mph); USA; Joseph Albert Walker; North American X-15; August 4, 1960	39,147 km (24,325 miles); USA; Archie Old Jr; B-52B Stratofortress; January 18, 1957	41,605 m (136,500 ft); USA; Robert Michael White; North American X-15; August 12, 1960	221,353 kg (488,000 lb); USA; Boeing; B-52G Stratofortress	12,251 kgf thrust (27,008 lbf thrust); USSR; Lyulka; Lyulka AL-21F
1961	6,587 km/h (4,093 mph); USA; Robert White; North American X-15; November 9, 1961	39,147 km (24,325 miles); USA; Archie Old Jr; B-52B Stratofortress; January 18, 1957	41,605 m (136,500 ft); USA; Robert Michael White; North American X-15; August 12, 1960	221,353 kg (488,000 lb); USA; Boeing; B-52G Stratofortress	12,251 kgf thrust (27,008 lbf thrust); USSR; Lyulka; Lyulka AL-21F
1962	6,605 km/h (4,104 mph); USA; Joseph Walker; North American X-15; June 27, 1962	39,147 km (24,325 miles); USA; Archie Old Jr; B-52B Stratofortress; January 18, 1957	95,936 m (314,750 ft); USA; Robert White; North American X-15; July 17, 1962	221,353 kg (488,000 lb); USA; Boeing; B-52G Stratofortress	12,251 kgf thrust (27,008 lbf thrust); USSR; Lyulka; Lyulka AL-21F
1963	6,605 km/h (4,104 mph); USA; Joseph Walker; North American X-15; June 27, 1962	39,147 km (24,325 miles); USA; Archie Old Jr; B-52B Stratofortress; January 18, 1957	107,960 m (354,200 ft); USA; Joseph Albert Walker; North American X-15; August 22, 1963	221,353 kg (488,000 lb); USA; Boeing; B-52G Stratofortress	12,251 kgf thrust (27,008 lbf thrust); USSR; Lyulka; Lyulka AL-21F
1964	6,605 km/h (4,104 mph); USA; Joseph Walker; North American X-15; June 27, 1962	39,147 km (24,325 miles); USA; Archie Old Jr; B-52B Stratofortress; January 18, 1957	107,960 m (354,200 ft); USA; Joseph Albert Walker; North American X-15; August 22, 1963	249,476 kg (550,000 lb); USA; North American; XB-70A Valkyrie	14,742 kgf thrust (32,500 lbf thrust); USA; Pratt & Whitney; Pratt & Whitney JT11D-20B
1965	6,605 km/h (4,104 mph); USA; Joseph Walker; North American X-15; June 27, 1962	39,147 km (24,325 miles); USA; Archie Old Jr; B-52B Stratofortress; January 18, 1957	107,960 m (354,200 ft); USA; Joseph Albert Walker; North American X-15; August 22, 1963	250,000 kg (551,147 lb); USSR; Antonov; Antonov An-22 Anteus	14,742 kgf thrust (32,500 lbf thrust); USA; Pratt & Whitney; Pratt & Whitney JT11D-20B
1966	6,605 km/h (4,104 mph); USA; Joseph Walker; North American X-15; June 27, 1962	39,147 km (24,325 miles); USA; Archie Old Jr; B-52B Stratofortress; January 18, 1957	107,960 m (354,200 ft); USA; Joseph Albert Walker; North American X-15; August 22, 1963	250,000 kg (551,147 lb); USSR; Antonov; Antonov An-22 Anteus	14,742 kgf thrust (32,500 lbf thrust); USA; Pratt & Whitney; Pratt & Whitney JT11D-20B
1967	7,297 km/h (4,534 mph); USA; Pete Knight; North American X-15; October 3, 1967	39,147 km (24,325 miles); USA; Archie Old Jr; B-52B Stratofortress; January 18, 1957	107,960 m (354,200 ft); USA; Joseph Albert Walker; North American X-15; August 22, 1963	250,000 kg (551,147 lb); USSR; Antonov; Antonov An-22 Anteus	14,742 kgf thrust (32,500 lbf thrust); USA; Pratt & Whitney; Pratt & Whitney JT11D-20B
1968	7,297 km/h (4,534 mph); USA; Pete Knight; North American X-15; October 3, 1967	39,147 km (24,325 miles); USA; Archie Old Jr; B-52B Stratofortress; January 18, 1957	107,960 m (354,200 ft); USA; Joseph Albert Walker; North American X-15; August 22, 1963	348,359 kg (768,000 lb); USA; Lockheed; C-5A Galaxy	20,000 kgf thrust (44,095 lbf thrust); USSR; Kuznetsov Design Bureau; Kuznetsov NK-144
1969	7,297 km/h (4,534 mph); USA; Pete Knight; North American X-15; October 3, 1967	39,147 km (24,325 miles); USA; Archie Old Jr; B-52B Stratofortress; January 18, 1957	107,960 m (354,200 ft); USA; Joseph Albert Walker; North American X-15; August 22, 1963	348,359 kg (768,000 lb); USA; Lockheed; C-5A Galaxy	21,296 kgf thrust (46,950 lbf thrust); USA; Pratt & Whitney; Pratt & Whitney JT9D-7AW
1970	7,297 km/h (4,534 mph); USA; Pete Knight; North American X-15; October 3, 1967	39,147 km (24,325 miles); USA; Archie Old Jr; B-52B Stratofortress; January 18, 1957	107,960 m (354,200 ft); USA; Joseph Albert Walker; North American X-15; August 22, 1963	351,534 kg (775,000 lb); USA; Boeing; Boeing 747-200B	21,296 kgf thrust (46,950 lbf thrust); USA; Pratt & Whitney; Pratt & Whitney JT9D-7AW
1971	7,297 km/h (4,534 mph); USA; Pete Knight; North American X-15; October 3, 1967	39,147 km (24,325 miles); USA; Archie Old Jr; B-52B Stratofortress; January 18, 1957	107,960 m (354,200 ft); USA; Joseph Albert Walker; North American X-15; August 22, 1963	377,842 kg (833,000 lb); USA; Boeing; Boeing 747-200F	22,861 kgf thrust (50,400 lbf thrust); USA; General Electric; General Electric CF6-50C
1972	7,297 km/h (4,534 mph); USA; Pete Knight; North American X-15; October 3, 1967	39,147 km (24,325 miles); USA; Archie Old Jr; B-52B Stratofortress; January 18, 1957	107,960 m (354,200 ft); USA; Joseph Albert Walker; North American X-15; August 22, 1963	377,842 kg (833,000 lb); USA; Boeing; Boeing 747-200F	22,861 kgf thrust (50,400 lbf thrust); USA; General Electric; General Electric CF6-50C
1973	7,297 km/h (4,534 mph); USA; Pete Knight; North American X-15; October 3, 1967	39,147 km (24,325 miles); USA; Archie Old Jr; B-52B Stratofortress; January 18, 1957	107,960 m (354,200 ft); USA; Joseph Albert Walker; North American X-15; August 22, 1963	377,842 kg (833,000 lb); USA; Boeing; Boeing 747-200F	23,496 kgf thrust (51,800 lbf thrust); USA; General Electric; General Electric CF6-50E
1974	7,297 km/h (4,534 mph); USA; Pete Knight; North American X-15; October 3, 1967	39,147 km (24,325 miles); USA; Archie Old Jr; B-52B Stratofortress; January 18, 1957	107,960 m (354,200 ft); USA; Joseph Albert Walker; North American X-15; August 22, 1963	377,842 kg (833,000 lb); USA; Boeing; Boeing 747-200F	23,496 kgf thrust (51,800 lbf thrust); USA; General Electric; General Electric CF6-50E
1975	7,297 km/h (4,534 mph); USA; Pete Knight; North American X-15; October 3, 1967	39,147 km (24,325 miles); USA; Archie Old Jr; B-52B Stratofortress; January 18, 1957	107,960 m (354,200 ft); USA; Joseph Albert Walker; North American X-15; August 22, 1963	377,842 kg (833,000 lb); USA; Boeing; Boeing 747-200F	23,496 kgf thrust (51,800 lbf thrust); USA; General Electric; General Electric CF6-50E
1976	7,297 km/h (4,534 mph); USA; Pete Knight; North American X-15; October 3, 1967	39,147 km (24,325 miles); USA; Archie Old Jr; B-52B Stratofortress; January 18, 1957	107,960 m (354,200 ft); USA; Joseph Albert Walker; North American X-15; August 22, 1963	377,842 kg (833,000 lb); USA; Boeing; Boeing 747-200F	24,145 kgf thrust (53,230 lbf thrust); USA; Pratt & Whitney; Pratt & Whitney JT9D-59B
1977	7,297 km/h (4,534 mph); USA; Pete Knight; North American X-15; October 3, 1967	39,147 km (24,325 miles); USA; Archie Old Jr; B-52B Stratofortress; January 18, 1957	107,960 m (354,200 ft); USA; Joseph Albert Walker; North American X-15; August 22, 1963	377,842 kg (833,000 lb); USA; Boeing; Boeing 747-200F	24,145 kgf thrust (53,230 lbf thrust); USA; Pratt & Whitney; Pratt & Whitney JT9D-59B
1978	7,297 km/h (4,534 mph); USA; Pete Knight; North American X-15; October 3, 1967	39,147 km (24,325 miles); USA; Archie Old Jr; B-52B Stratofortress; January 18, 1957	107,960 m (354,200 ft); USA; Joseph Albert Walker; North American X-15; August 22, 1963	377,842 kg (833,000 lb); USA; Boeing; Boeing 747-200F	24,190 kgf thrust (53,330 lbf thrust); USA; Pratt & Whitney; Pratt & Whitney JT9D-7Q1
1979	7,297 km/h (4,534 mph); USA; Pete Knight; North American X-15; October 3, 1967	39,147 km (24,325 miles); USA; Archie Old Jr; B-52B Stratofortress; January 18, 1957	107,960 m (354,200 ft); USA; Joseph Albert Walker; North American X-15; August 22, 1963	377,842 kg (833,000 lb); USA; Boeing; Boeing 747-200F	24,190 kgf thrust (53,330 lbf thrust); USA; Pratt & Whitney; Pratt & Whitney JT9D-7Q1
1980	7,297 km/h (4,534 mph); USA; Pete Knight; North American X-15; October 3, 1967	39,147 km (24,325 miles); USA; Archie Old Jr; B-52B Stratofortress; January 18, 1957	107,960 m (354,200 ft); USA; Joseph Albert Walker; North American X-15; August 22, 1963	377,842 kg (833,000 lb); USA; Boeing; Boeing 747-200F	24,875 kgf thrust (54,840 lbf thrust); USA; Pratt & Whitney; Pratt & Whitney JT9D-7Q2
1981	7,297 km/h (4,534 mph); USA; Pete Knight; North American X-15; October 3, 1967	39,147 km (24,325 miles); USA; Archie Old Jr; B-52B Stratofortress; January 18, 1957	107,960 m (354,200 ft); USA; Joseph Albert Walker; North American X-15; August 22, 1963	377,842 kg (833,000 lb); USA; Boeing; Boeing 747-200F	24,875 kgf thrust (54,840 lbf thrust); USA; Pratt & Whitney; Pratt & Whitney JT9D-7Q2
1982	7,297 km/h (4,534 mph); USA; Pete Knight; North American X-15; October 3, 1967	39,147 km (24,325 miles); USA; Archie Old Jr; B-52B Stratofortress; January 18, 1957	107,960 m (354,200 ft); USA; Joseph Albert Walker; North American X-15; August 22, 1963	377,842 kg (833,000 lb); USA; Boeing; Boeing 747-200F	25,401 kgf thrust (56,000 lbf thrust); USA; Pratt & Whitney; Pratt & Whitney JT9D-7H1
1983	7,297 km/h (4,534 mph); USA; Pete Knight; North American X-15; October 3, 1967	39,147 km (24,325 miles); USA; Archie Old Jr; B-52B Stratofortress; January 18, 1957	107,960 m (354,200 ft); USA; Joseph Albert Walker; North American X-15; August 22, 1963	377,842 kg (833,000 lb); USA; Boeing; Boeing 747-200F	25,401 kgf thrust (56,000 lbf thrust); USA; Pratt & Whitney; Pratt & Whitney JT9D-7H1
1984	7,297 km/h (4,534 mph); USA; Pete Knight; North American X-15; October 3, 1967	39,147 km (24,325 miles); USA; Archie Old Jr; B-52B Stratofortress; January 18, 1957	107,960 m (354,200 ft); USA; Joseph Albert Walker; North American X-15; August 22, 1963	377,842 kg (833,000 lb); USA; Boeing; Boeing 747-200F	25,401 kgf thrust (56,000 lbf thrust); USA; Pratt & Whitney; Pratt & Whitney JT9D-7H1
1985	7,297 km/h (4,534 mph); USA; Pete Knight; North American X-15; October 3, 1967	39,147 km (24,325 miles); USA; Archie Old Jr; B-52B Stratofortress; January 18, 1957	107,960 m (354,200 ft); USA; Joseph Albert Walker; North American X-15; August 22, 1963	404,994 kg (892,859 lb); USSR; Antonov; Antonov An-124 Condor	26,762 kgf thrust (59,000 lbf thrust); USA; General Electric; General Electric CF6-80C2A1
1986	7,297 km/h (4,534 mph); USA; Pete Knight; North American X-15; October 3, 1967	40,213 km (24,987 miles); USA; Dick Rutan and Jeana Yeager; Voyager; December 23, 1986	107,960 m (354,200 ft); USA; Joseph Albert Walker; North American X-15; August 22, 1963	404,994 kg (892,859 lb); USSR; Antonov; Antonov An-124 Condor	26,762 kgf thrust (59,000 lbf thrust); USA; General Electric; General Electric CF6-80C2A1
1987	7,297 km/h (4,534 mph); USA; Pete Knight; North American X-15; October 3, 1967	40,213 km (24,987 miles); USA; Dick Rutan and Jeana Yeager; Voyager; December 23, 1986	107,960 m (354,200 ft); USA; Joseph Albert Walker; North American X-15; August 22, 1963	404,994 kg (892,859 lb); USSR; Antonov; Antonov An-124 Condor	27,896 kgf thrust (61,500 lbf thrust); USA; General Electric; General Electric CF6-80C2A5
1988	7,297 km/h (4,534 mph); USA; Pete Knight; North American X-15; October 3, 1967	40,213 km (24,987 miles); USA; Dick Rutan and Jeana Yeager; Voyager; December 23, 1986	107,960 m (354,200 ft); USA; Joseph Albert Walker; North American X-15; August 22, 1963	404,994 kg (892,859 lb); USSR; Antonov; Antonov An-124 Condor	27,896 kgf thrust (61,500 lbf thrust); USA; General Electric; General Electric CF6-80C2A5
1989	7,297 km/h (4,534 mph); USA; Pete Knight; North American X-15; October 3, 1967	40,213 km (24,987 miles); USA; Dick Rutan and Jeana Yeager; Voyager; December 23, 1986	107,960 m (354,200 ft); USA; Joseph Albert Walker; North American X-15; August 22, 1963	640,000 kg (1,410,958 lb); USSR; Antonov; Antonov An-225 Mriya	27,896 kgf thrust (61,500 lbf thrust); USA; General Electric; General Electric CF6-80C2A5
1990	7,297 km/h (4,534 mph); USA; Pete Knight; North American X-15; October 3, 1967	40,213 km (24,987 miles); USA; Dick Rutan and Jeana Yeager; Voyager; December 23, 1986	107,960 m (354,200 ft); USA; Joseph Albert Walker; North American X-15; August 22, 1963	640,000 kg (1,410,958 lb); USSR; Antonov; Antonov An-225 Mriya	27,928 kgf thrust (61,570 lbf thrust); USA; Pratt & Whitney; Pratt & Whitney 4060A
1991	7,297 km/h (4,534 mph); USA; Pete Knight; North American X-15; October 3, 1967	40,213 km (24,987 miles); USA; Dick Rutan and Jeana Yeager; Voyager; December 23, 1986	107,960 m (354,200 ft); USA; Joseph Albert Walker; North American X-15; August 22, 1963	640,000 kg (1,410,958 lb); USSR; Antonov; Antonov An-225 Mriya	27,928 kgf thrust (61,570 lbf thrust); USA; Pratt & Whitney; Pratt & Whitney 4060A
1992	7,297 km/h (4,534 mph); USA; Pete Knight; North American X-15; October 3, 1967	40,213 km (24,987 miles); USA; Dick Rutan and Jeana Yeager; Voyager; December 23, 1986	107,960 m (354,200 ft); USA; Joseph Albert Walker; North American X-15; August 22, 1963	640,000 kg (1,410,958 lb); USSR; Antonov; Antonov An-225 Mriya	27,928 kgf thrust (61,570 lbf thrust); USA; Pratt & Whitney; Pratt & Whitney 4060A
1993	7,297 km/h (4,534 mph); USA; Pete Knight; North American X-15; October 3, 1967	40,213 km (24,987 miles); USA; Dick Rutan and Jeana Yeager; Voyager; December 23, 1986	107,960 m (354,200 ft); USA; Joseph Albert Walker; North American X-15; August 22, 1963	640,000 kg (1,410,958 lb); USSR; Antonov; Antonov An-225 Mriya	27,928 kgf thrust (61,570 lbf thrust); USA; Pratt & Whitney; Pratt & Whitney 4060A
1994	7,297 km/h (4,534 mph); USA; Pete Knight; North American X-15; October 3, 1967	40,213 km (24,987 miles); USA; Dick Rutan and Jeana Yeager; Voyager; December 23, 1986	107,960 m (354,200 ft); USA; Joseph Albert Walker; North American X-15; August 22, 1963	640,000 kg (1,410,958 lb); USSR; Antonov; Antonov An-225 Mriya	27,928 kgf thrust (61,570 lbf thrust); USA; Pratt & Whitney; Pratt & Whitney 4060A
1995	7,297 km/h (4,534 mph); USA; Pete Knight; North American X-15; October 3, 1967	40,213 km (24,987 miles); USA; Dick Rutan and Jeana Yeager; Voyager; December 23, 1986	107,960 m (354,200 ft); USA; Joseph Albert Walker; North American X-15; August 22, 1963	640,000 kg (1,410,958 lb); USSR; Antonov; Antonov An-225 Mriya	27,928 kgf thrust (61,570 lbf thrust); USA; Pratt & Whitney; Pratt & Whitney 4060A
1996	7,297 km/h (4,534 mph); USA; Pete Knight; North American X-15; October 3, 1967	40,213 km (24,987 miles); USA; Dick Rutan and Jeana Yeager; Voyager; December 23, 1986	107,960 m (354,200 ft); USA; Joseph Albert Walker; North American X-15; August 22, 1963	640,000 kg (1,410,958 lb); USSR; Antonov; Antonov An-225 Mriya	27,928 kgf thrust (61,570 lbf thrust); USA; Pratt & Whitney; Pratt & Whitney 4060A
1997	7,297 km/h (4,534 mph); USA; Pete Knight; North American X-15; October 3, 1967	40,213 km (24,987 miles); USA; Dick Rutan and Jeana Yeager; Voyager; December 23, 1986	107,960 m (354,200 ft); USA; Joseph Albert Walker; North American X-15; August 22, 1963	640,000 kg (1,410,958 lb); USSR; Antonov; Antonov An-225 Mriya	27,928 kgf thrust (61,570 lbf thrust); USA; Pratt & Whitney; Pratt & Whitney 4060A
1998	7,297 km/h (4,534 mph); USA; Pete Knight; North American X-15; October 3, 1967	40,213 km (24,987 miles); USA; Dick Rutan and Jeana Yeager; Voyager; December 23, 1986	107,960 m (354,200 ft); USA; Joseph Albert Walker; North American X-15; August 22, 1963	640,000 kg (1,410,958 lb); USSR; Antonov; Antonov An-225 Mriya	27,928 kgf thrust (61,570 lbf thrust); USA; Pratt & Whitney; Pratt & Whitney 4060A
1999	7,297 km/h (4,534 mph); USA; Pete Knight; North American X-15; October 3, 1967	40,213 km (24,987 miles); USA; Dick Rutan and Jeana Yeager; Voyager; December 23, 1986	107,960 m (354,200 ft); USA; Joseph Albert Walker; North American X-15; August 22, 1963	640,000 kg (1,410,958 lb); USSR; Antonov; Antonov An-225 Mriya	27,928 kgf thrust (61,570 lbf thrust); USA; Pratt & Whitney; Pratt & Whitney 4060A
2000	7,297 km/h (4,534 mph); USA; Pete Knight; North American X-15; October 3, 1967	40,213 km (24,987 miles); USA; Dick Rutan and Jeana Yeager; Voyager; December 23, 1986	107,960 m (354,200 ft); USA; Joseph Albert Walker; North American X-15; August 22, 1963	640,000 kg (1,410,958 lb); USSR; Antonov; Antonov An-225 Mriya	27,928 kgf thrust (61,570 lbf thrust); USA; Pratt & Whitney; Pratt & Whitney 4060A
2001	7,297 km/h (4,534 mph); USA; Pete Knight; North American X-15; October 3, 1967	40,213 km (24,987 miles); USA; Dick Rutan and Jeana Yeager; Voyager; December 23, 1986	107,960 m (354,200 ft); USA; Joseph Albert Walker; North American X-15; August 22, 1963	640,000 kg (1,410,958 lb); USSR; Antonov; Antonov An-225 Mriya	27,928 kgf thrust (61,570 lbf thrust); USA; Pratt & Whitney; Pratt & Whitney 4060A
2002	7,297 km/h (4,534 mph); USA; Pete Knight; North American X-15; October 3, 1967	40,213 km (24,987 miles); USA; Dick Rutan and Jeana Yeager; Voyager; December 23, 1986	107,960 m (354,200 ft); USA; Joseph Albert Walker; North American X-15; August 22, 1963	640,000 kg (1,410,958 lb); USSR; Antonov; Antonov An-225 Mriya	27,928 kgf thrust (61,570 lbf thrust); USA; Pratt & Whitney; Pratt & Whitney 4060A
2003	7,297 km/h (4,534 mph); USA; Pete Knight; North American X-15; October 3, 1967	40,213 km (24,987 miles); USA; Dick Rutan and Jeana Yeager; Voyager; December 23, 1986	107,960 m (354,200 ft); USA; Joseph Albert Walker; North American X-15; August 22, 1963	640,000 kg (1,410,958 lb); USSR; Antonov; Antonov An-225 Mriya	27,928 kgf thrust (61,570 lbf thrust); USA; Pratt & Whitney; Pratt & Whitney 4060A
2004	7,297 km/h (4,534 mph); USA; Pete Knight; North American X-15; October 3, 1967	40,213 km (24,987 miles); USA; Dick Rutan and Jeana Yeager; Voyager; December 23, 1986	112,000 m (367,454 ft); USA; Brian Binnie; Scaled Composites SpaceShipOne; October 4, 2004	640,000 kg (1,410,958 lb); USSR; Antonov; Antonov An-225 Mriya	27,928 kgf thrust (61,570 lbf thrust); USA; Pratt & Whitney; Pratt & Whitney 4060A
2005	7,297 km/h (4,534 mph); USA; Pete Knight; North American X-15; October 3, 1967	41,467 km (25,766 miles); USA; Steve Fossett; Virgin Atlantic GlobalFlyer; March 3, 2005	112,000 m (367,454 ft); USA; Brian Binnie; Scaled Composites SpaceShipOne; October 4, 2004	640,000 kg (1,410,958 lb); USSR; Antonov; Antonov An-225 Mriya	27,928 kgf thrust (61,570 lbf thrust); USA; Pratt & Whitney; Pratt & Whitney 4060A
2006	7,297 km/h (4,534 mph); USA; Pete Knight; North American X-15; October 3, 1967	41,467 km (25,766 miles); USA; Steve Fossett; Virgin Atlantic GlobalFlyer; March 3, 2005	112,000 m (367,454 ft); USA; Brian Binnie; Scaled Composites SpaceShipOne; October 4, 2004	640,000 kg (1,410,958 lb); USSR; Antonov; Antonov An-225 Mriya	27,928 kgf thrust (61,570 lbf thrust); USA; Pratt & Whitney; Pratt & Whitney 4060A
2007	7,297 km/h (4,534 mph); USA; Pete Knight; North American X-15; October 3, 1967	41,467 km (25,766 miles); USA; Steve Fossett; Virgin Atlantic GlobalFlyer; March 3, 2005	112,000 m (367,454 ft); USA; Brian Binnie; Scaled Composites SpaceShipOne; October 4, 2004	640,000 kg (1,410,958 lb); USSR; Antonov; Antonov An-225 Mriya	27,928 kgf thrust (61,570 lbf thrust); USA; Pratt & Whitney; Pratt & Whitney 4060A
