= List of flight altitude records =

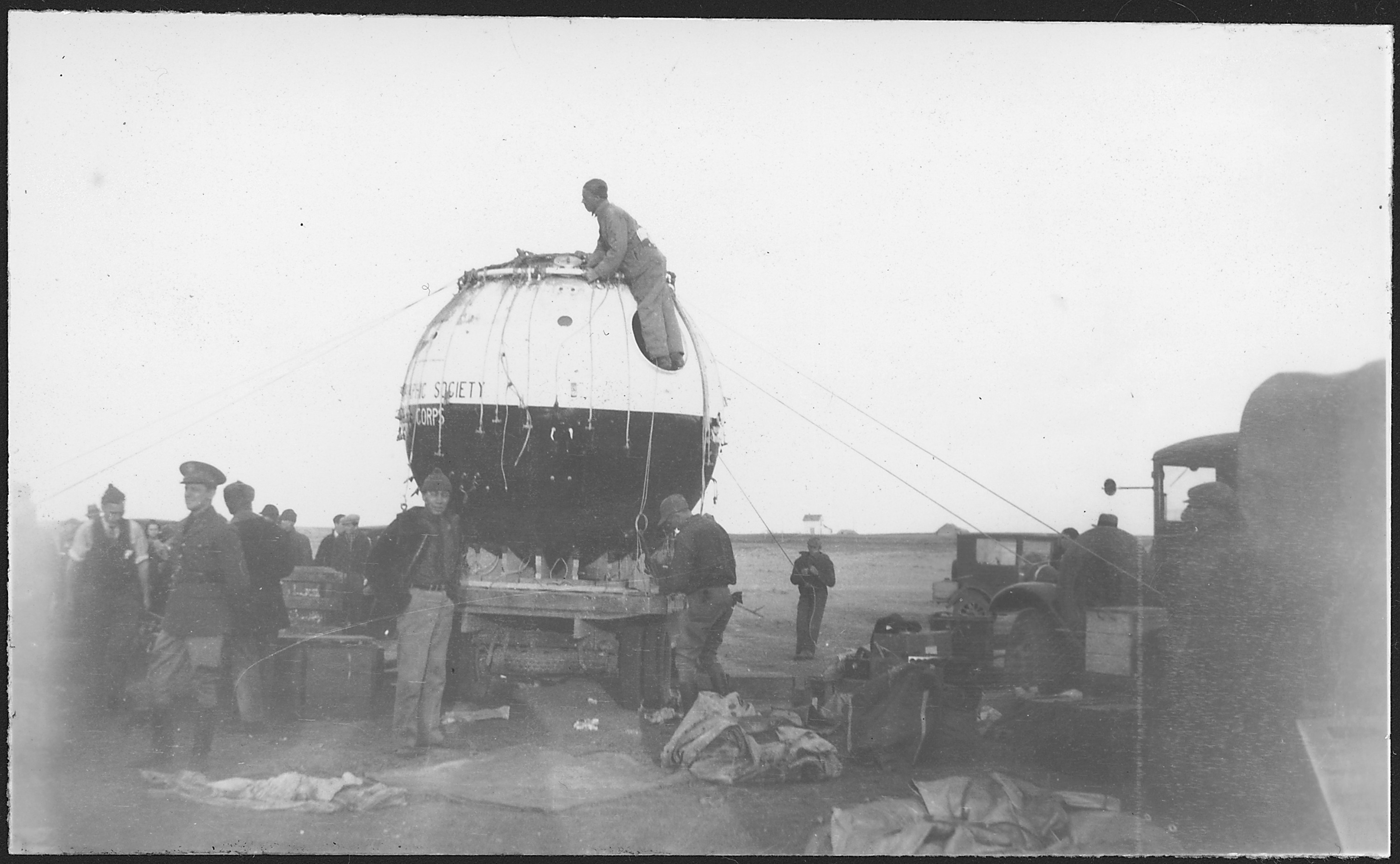
Explorer II gondola, 1935

This listing of flight altitude records are the records set for the highest aeronautical flights conducted in the atmosphere and beyond, set since the age of ballooning.

Some, but not all of the records were certified by the non-profit international aviation organization, the Fédération Aéronautique Internationale (FAI), founded on 14 October 1905 in Paris by Aéro Clubs from several nations. One reason for a lack of 'official' certification was that the flight occurred prior to the creation of the FAI.

For clarity, the "Fixed-wing aircraft" table is sorted by FAI-designated categories as determined by whether the record-creating aircraft left the ground by its own power (category "Altitude"), or whether it was first carried aloft by a carrier-aircraft prior to its record setting event (category "Altitude gain", or formally "Altitude Gain, Aeroplane Launched from a Carrier Aircraft"). Other sub-categories describe the airframe, and more importantly, the powerplant type (since rocket-powered aircraft can have greater altitude abilities than those with airbreathing jet engines).

An essential requirement for the creation of an "official" altitude record is the employment of FAI-certified observers present during the record-setting flight. Thus several records noted are unofficial due to the lack of such observers.

== Balloons ==
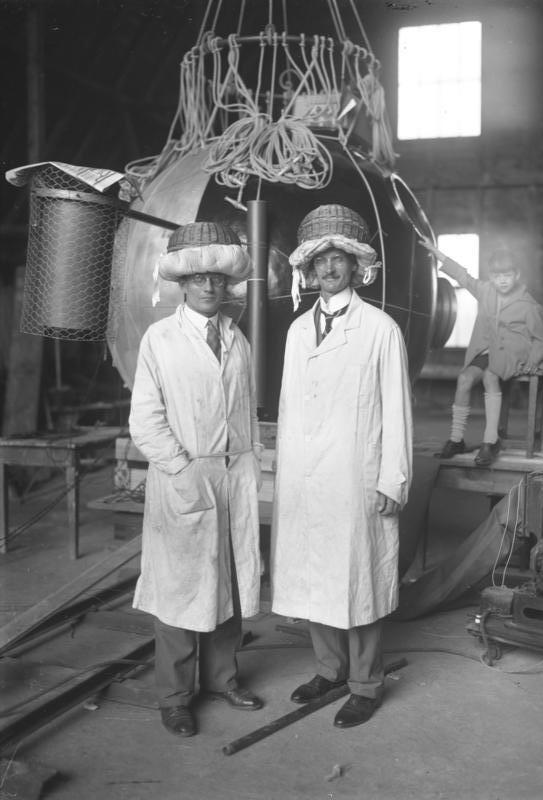
In 1931, Auguste Piccard and Paul Kipfer (photo) reached a record altitude of 15,781 m. In 1932, Auguste Piccard and Max Cosyns made a second record-breaking ascent to 16,201 m. Auguste Piccard ultimately made a total of twenty-seven balloon flights, setting a final record of 23,000 m.

- 1783-10-15: 24 m (79 ft); Jean-François Pilâtre de Rozier of France, the first ascent in a hot-air balloon.
- 1783-10-19: 81 m (266 ft); Jean-François Pilâtre de Rozier, in Paris.
- 1783-10-19: 105 m (344 ft); Jean-François Pilâtre de Rozier with André Giroud de Villette, in Paris.
- 1783-11-21: 1,000 m (3,300 ft); Jean-François Pilâtre de Rozier with Marquis d'Arlandes, in Paris.
- 1783-12-01: 2.7 km (8,900 ft); Jacques Alexandre Charles and his assistant Marie-Noël Robert, both of France, made the first flight in a hydrogen balloon to about 610 m (2,000 ft). Charles then ascended alone to the record altitude.
- 1784-06-23: 4 km (13,000 ft); Pilâtre de Rozier and the chemist Joseph Proust in a Montgolfier.
- 1803-07-18: 7.28 km (23,900 ft); Étienne-Gaspard Robert and Auguste Lhoëst in a balloon.
- 1839: 7.9 km (26,000 ft); Charles Green and Spencer Rush in a free balloon.
- 1862-09-05: about 29,500 ft (9,000 m); Henry Coxwell and James Glaisher in a balloon filled with coal gas. Glaisher lost consciousness during the ascent due to the low air pressure and cold temperature of −11 °C (12 °F).
- 1901-07-31: 10.8 km (35,000 ft); Arthur Berson and Reinhard Süring in the hydrogen balloon Preußen, in an open basket and with oxygen in steel cylinders. This flight contributed to the discovery of the stratosphere.
- 1927-11-04: 13.222 km (43,380 ft); Captain Hawthorne C. Gray, of the U.S. Army Air Corps, in a helium balloon. Gray lost consciousness after his oxygen supply ran out and was killed in the crash.
- 1931-05-27: 15.781 km (51,770 ft); Auguste Piccard and Paul Kipfer in a hydrogen balloon.
- 1932: 16.201 km (53,150 ft) -Auguste Piccard and Max Cosyns in a hydrogen balloon.
- 1933-09-30: 18.501 km (60,700 ft); USSR balloon USSR-1.
- 1933-11-20: 18.592 km (61,000 ft); Lt. Comdr. Thomas G. W. Settle (USN) and Maj Chester L. Fordney (USMC) in Century of Progress balloon
- 1934-01-30: 21.946 km (72,000 ft); USSR balloon Osoaviakhim-1. The three crew were killed when the balloon broke up during the descent.
- 1935-11-10: 22.066 km (72,400 ft); Captain O. A. Anderson and Captain A. W. Stevens (U.S. Army Air Corps) ascended in the Explorer II gondola from the Stratobowl, near Rapid City, South Dakota, for a flight that lasted 8 hours 13 minutes and covered 362 kilometres (225 mi).
- 1956-11-08: 23.165 km (76,000 ft); Malcolm D. Ross and M. L. Lewis (U.S. Navy) in Office of Naval Research Strato-Lab I, using a pressurized gondola and plastic balloon launching near Rapid City, South Dakota, and landing 282 km (175 mi) away near Kennedy, Nebraska.
- 1957-06-02: 29.4997 km (96,784 ft); Captain Joseph W. Kittinger (U.S. Air Force) ascended in the Project Manhigh 1 gondola to a record-breaking altitude.
- 1957-08-19: 31.212 km (102,400 ft); above sea level, Major David Simons (U.S. Air Force) ascended from the Portsmouth Mine near Crosby, Minnesota, in the Manhigh 2 gondola for a 32-hour record-breaking flight. Simons landed at 5:32 p.m. on August 20 in northeastern South Dakota.
- 1960-08-16: 31.333 km (102,800 ft); Testing a high-altitude parachute system, Joseph Kittinger of the U.S. Air Force parachuted from the Excelsior III balloon over New Mexico at 102,800 ft (31,300 m). He set world records for: high-altitude jump; freefall diving by falling 26 km (16 mi) before opening his parachute; and fastest speed achieved by a human without motorized assistance, 988 km/h (614 mph).
- 1961-05-04: 34.668 km (113,740 ft); Commander Malcolm D. Ross and Lieutenant Commander Victor A. Prather, Jr., of the U.S. Navy ascended in the Strato-Lab V, in an unpressurized gondola. After descending, the gondola containing the two balloonists landed in the Gulf of Mexico. Prather slipped off the rescue helicopter's hook into the gulf and drowned. (Note: The FAI Absolute Altitude (#2325) record for balloon flight set in 1961 by Malcolm Ross and Victor Prather is still current, since it requires the balloonist to descend with the balloon.)
- 1966-02-02: 37.6 km (123,000 ft); Amateur parachutist Nicholas Piantanida of the United States with his "Project Strato-Jump" II balloon. Because he was unable to disconnect his oxygen line from the gondola's main feed, the ground crew had to remotely detach the balloon from the gondola. His planned free fall and parachute jump was abandoned, and he returned to the ground in the gondola. Nick was unable to accomplish his desired free fall record, however his spectacular flight set other records that held up for 46 years. Because of the design of his glove, he was unable to reattach his safety seat belt harness. He endured very high g-forces, but survived the descent. Piantanida's ascent is not recognized by the Fédération Aéronautique Internationale as a balloon altitude world record, because he did not return with his balloon, although that was not the feat he was trying to accomplish. On this second attempt of "Project Strato-Jump", Nick Piantanida took with him 250 postmarked air-mail envelopes and letters. At the time, these letters were the first covers to have ever been delivered by the U.S. Post Office via space. The habit of taking cover letters to space continued with the Apollo Program; in 1972 there was a scandal involving the Apollo 15 astronauts. It is unclear if any of the "Project Strato-Jump" covers survived, and were eventually mailed to the intended recipients.
- 2012-10-14: 38.969 km (127,850 ft); Felix Baumgartner in the Red Bull Stratos balloon. The flight started near Roswell, New Mexico, and returned to earth with a record-setting parachute jump.
- 2014-10-24: 41.424 kilometres (135,910 ft); Alan Eustace, a senior vice president at the Google corporation, in a helium balloon, returning to earth via parachute jump during the StratEx mission executed by Paragon Space Development Corporation.

=== Hot-air balloons ===
Year	Date	Altitude		Person	Aircraft	Notes
Year	Date	imperial	metric	Person	Aircraft	Notes
1783	October 15	84 ft	26 m	Pilâtre de Rozier	Montgolfier	tethered balloon
1988	June 6	64,996 ft	19,811 m	Per Lindstrand	Colt 600	In Laredo, Texas.
2004	December 13	21,699 ft	6,614 m	David Hempleman-Adams	Boland Rover A-2	Fédération Aéronautique Internationale record for hot air balloon as of 2007
2005	November 26	68,986 ft	21,027 m	Vijaypat Singhania	Cameron Z-1600	Vijaypat Singhania set the world altitude record for hot-air-balloon flight, reaching 21,027 m (68,986 ft). He launched from downtown Mumbai, India, and landed 240 km (150 mi) south in Panchale.

=== Uncrewed gas balloon ===
During 1893 French scientist Jules Richard constructed sounding balloons. These uncrewed balloons, carrying light, but very precise instruments, approached an altitude of 15.24 km (50,000 ft).

A Winzen balloon launched from Chico, California, in 1972 set the uncrewed altitude record of 51.8 km (170,000 ft). Its volume was 1,350,000 m^{3} (47,800,000 ft^{3}).

On September 20, 2013, JAXA launched an ultrathin film balloon called BS13-08 made of 2.8 μm thick polyethylene film with a volume of 80,000 m^{3} (2,800,000 ft^{3}), which was 60 m (200 ft) in diameter. The balloon rose at a speed of 250 metres per minute (820 ft/min) and reached an altitude of 53.7 km (176,000 ft), surpassing the previous world record set in 2002.

This was the greatest height a flying object reached without using rockets or a launch with a cannon.

== Gliders ==
5th november 1966 polish pilot Stanisław Józefczak with passenger Jan Tarczoń on polish woodmade training glider SZD-9 Bocian climb to 12560m over Tatry mountain in Poland On February 17, 1986, the highest altitude obtained by a soaring aircraft was set at 14.938 km (49,009 ft) by Robert Harris using lee waves over California City, United States. The flight was accomplished using the Grob 102 Standard Astir III.

This was surpassed at 15,460 m (50,720 ft) set on August 30, 2006, by Steve Fossett (pilot) and Einar Enevoldson (co-pilot) in their high performance research glider Perlan 1, a modified Glaser-Dirks DG-500. This record was achieved over El Calafate (Patagonia, Argentina) and set as part of the Perlan Project.

This was raised at 15.902 km (52,172 ft) on September 3, 2017 by Jim Payne (pilot) and Morgan Sandercock (co-pilot) in the Perlan 2, a special built high altitude research glider. This record was again achieved over El Calafate and as part of the Perlan Project.

On September 2, 2018, within the Airbus Perlan Mission II, again from El Calafate, the Perlan II piloted by Jim Payne and Tim Gardner reached 23.203 km (76,124 ft), surpassing the 22.475 km (73,737 ft) attained by Jerry Hoyt on April 17, 1989, in a Lockheed U-2: the highest subsonic flight.

== Early Fixed-wing Propeller aircraft ==
Early, disputed attempts to fly or glide near the ground

Year	Date	Altitude		Person	Aircraft	Notes
Year	Date	Imperial	Metric	Person	Aircraft	Notes
1890	October 8	8 in	0.2 m	Clément Ader	Éole	Uncontrolled hop
1903	December 17	10 ft	3 m	Wilbur Wright, Orville Wright	Wright Flyer	Photographed and witnessed controlled flight, using rail and head winds
1906	19 August	8 ft	2 m	Traian Vuia	Vuia I	Hop of 24 m (79 ft) at a height of about 2.5 m (8 ft) was made, ending in a heavy landing which damaged the propeller, after takeoff from a flat surface, without assistance such as an incline, rails, or catapult
1906	October 23	10 ft	3 m	Alberto Santos-Dumont	14-bis	Public flights in Paris, using the Antoinette 8V engine, winning 3000 francs for a flight of 25 m (82 ft)
1906	November 12	13 ft	4 m	Alberto Santos-Dumont	14-bis	Flights up to 220 meters long, earning 1000 francs for a flight of 100+ meters

== Fixed-wing Propeller aircraft ==
Public, documented flights

Year	Date	Altitude		Person	Aircraft	Notes					
Year	Date	1908	December 18	Person	Aircraft	Notes	360 ft	110 m	Wilbur Wright	Wright Model A	at Auvers near Le Mans, using catapult start
1909	July 18	492 ft	150 m	Louis Paulhan	Farman III	Concours d’Aviation, La Brayelle, Douai					
1909		3,018 ft	920 m	Louis Paulhan	Farman III	Lyon					
1910	January 9	4,164 ft	1,269 m	Louis Paulhan	Farman III	Los Angeles Air Meet					
1910	June 17	4,603 ft	1,403 m	Walter Brookins	Wright Model B						
1910	August 11	6,621 ft	2,018 m	John Armstrong Drexel	Blériot monoplane	Lanark Aviation Meeting					
1910	October 30	8,471 ft	2,582 m	Ralph Johnstone	Wright Model B	International Aviation Tournament was at the Belmont Park race track in Elmont, New York					
1910	December 26	11,474 ft	3,497 m	Archibald Hoxsey	Wright Model B	Second International Aviation Meet held in 1910 at Dominguez Field, Los Angeles. Hoxsey died in a plane crash five days later while trying to set a new record.					
1912	September 11	18,410 ft	5,610 m	Roland Garros	Blériot monoplane	Saint-Brieuc (France)					
1915	January 5	11,950 ft	3,640 m	Joseph Eugene Carberry	Curtiss Model E						
1916	November 9	26,083 ft	7,950 m	Guido Guidi	Caudron G.4	Torino Mirafiori airfield					
1919	June 14	31,230 ft	9,520 m	Jean Casale	Nieuport NiD.29						
1920	February 27	33,113 ft	10,093 m	Major Rudolf Schroeder	LUSAC-11						
1921	September 18	34,508 ft	10,518 m	Lt. John Arthur Macready							
1923	September 5	35,240 ft	10,740 m	Joseph Sadi-Lecointe	Nieuport NiD.40R						
1923	October 30	36,565 ft	11,145 m	Joseph Sadi-Lecointe	Nieuport NiD.40R						
1924	October 21	39,587 ft	12,066 m	Jean Callizo	Gourdou-Leseurre 40 C.1	Callizo later claimed several higher records, but these were stripped from him, as he had falsified barograph readings.					
1928	December 7	20,269 ft	6,178 m	Louise Thaden	Travel Air 3000	Woman's altitude record					
1930	June 4	43,168 ft	13,158 m	Lt. Apollo Soucek, USN	Wright Apache						
1932	September 16	43,976 ft	13,404 m	Cyril Uwins	Vickers Vespa						
1933	September 28	44,819 ft	13,661 m	Gustave Lemoine	Potez 506						
1934	April 11	47,354 ft	14,433 m	Renato Donati	Caproni Ca.113 AQ						
1936	August 14	48,698 ft	14,843 m	Georges Détré	Potez 506	highest with no pressure suit					
1936	September 28	49,967 ft	15,230 m	Squadron Leader Francis Ronald Swain	Bristol Type 138						
1938	June 30	53,937 ft	16,440 m	M. J. Adam	Bristol Type 138						
1938	October 22	56,850 ft	17,330 m	Lt. Colonel Mario Pezzi	Caproni Ca.161	current crewed, propeller-driven, biplane record					

== Other Fixed-wing aircraft ==
Year	Date	Altitude		Person	Aircraft	Propulsion	Notes						
Year	Date	1948	March 23	Person	Aircraft	Propulsion	Notes	59,430 ft	18,114 m	John Cunningham	de Havilland Vampire	turbojet	Modified Vampire F.1 with extended wingtips and a de Havilland Ghost jet engine.
1949	August 8	71,902 ft	21,916 m	Brigadier General Frank Kendall Everest Jr.	Bell X-1	air-launched rocket plane	Unofficial record.						
1951	August 15	79,494 ft	24,230 m	Bill Bridgeman	Douglas D-558-2 Skyrocket	air-launched rocket plane	Unofficial record. Powered by the XLR11 liquid fuel rocket engine (designated as XLR8-RM-5).						
1953	May 4	63,668 ft	19,406 m	Walter Gibb	English Electric Canberra B.2	turbojet	propelled by two Rolls-Royce Olympus engines.						
1953	August 21	83,235 ft	25,370 m	Lt. Col. Marion Carl	Douglas D-558-2 Skyrocket	air-launched rocket plane	Unofficial record. Powered by the XLR11 liquid fuel rocket engine (designated as XLR8-RM-5).						
1954	May 28	90,440 ft	27,570 m	Arthur W. Murray	Bell X-1A	air-launched rocket plane	Unofficial record. Powered by the XLR11 liquid fuel rocket engine.						
1955	August 29	65,876 ft	20,079 m	Walter Gibb	English Electric Canberra B.2	turbojet	Olympus powered.						
1956	September 7	126,283 ft	38,491 m	Iven Kincheloe	Bell X-2	air-launched rocket plane							
1957	August 28	70,310 ft	21,430 m	Mike Randrup	English Electric Canberra WK163	turbojet & rocket	With Napier "Double Scorpion" rocket motor						
1958	April 18	76,939 ft	23,451 m	Lt. Commander George C. Watkins, USN	Grumman F11F-1F Super Tiger	turbojet							
1958	May 2	79,452 ft	24,217 m	Roger Carpentier	SNCASO Trident II	turbojet & rocket							
1958	May 7	91,243 ft	27,811 m	Major Howard C. Johnson	Lockheed F-104 Starfighter	turbojet	This F-104 became the first aircraft to simultaneously hold the world speed, rate of climb and altitude records when on May 16, 1958, U.S. Air Force Capt. Walter W. Irwin set a world speed record of 1,404.19 mph						
1959	September 4	94,658 ft	28,852 m	Vladimir Ilyushin	Sukhoi Su-9	turbojet							
1959	December 6	98,557 ft	30,040 m	Commander Lawrence E. Flint, Jr.	McDonnell Douglas F-4 Phantom II	turbojet							
1959	December 14	103,389 ft	31,513 m	Capt "Joe" B. Jordan	Lockheed F-104 Starfighter	turbojet	General Electric J79						
1961	March 30	169,600 ft	51,700 m	Joseph Albert Walker	X-15	air-launched rocket plane	First human to reach the mesosphere. Last world altitude record before Yuri Gagarin's orbital flight Vostok 1.						
1961	April 28	113,891 ft	34,714 m	Georgy Mosolov	Ye-66A Mig-21	turbojet & rocket	R-11						
1962	July 17	314,700 ft	95,900 m	Robert Michael White	X-15	air-launched rocket plane	Not a C-1 FAI record						
1963	July 19	347,400 ft	105,900 m	Joseph Albert Walker	X-15	air-launched rocket plane	Not a C-1 FAI record.						
1963	August 22	353,200 ft	107,700 m	Joseph Albert Walker	X-15	air-launched rocket plane	Not a C-1 FAI record						
1963	October 22	118,860 ft	36,230 m	Major Robert W. Smith	Lockheed NF-104A	turbojet & rocket	Unofficial altitude record for an aircraft with self-powered takeoff.						
1963	December 6	120,800 ft	36,800 m	Major Robert W. Smith	Lockheed NF-104A	turbojet & rocket	Unofficial altitude record for an aircraft with self-powered takeoff.						
1973	July 25	118,898 ft	36,240 m	Aleksandr Fedotov	Mikoyan-Gurevich Ye-266 MiG-25	turbojet	Under Federation Aeronautique Internationale (FAI) classification the Ye-155 type						
1976	July 28	85,069 ft	25,929 m	Captain Robert Helt	Lockheed SR-71 Blackbird	turbojet	Absolute record for altitude in horizontal flight. Pratt & Whitney J58; Absolute Record of FAI classes C, H and M Another SR-71 set absolute speed record on the same day.						
1977	August 31	123,520 ft	37,650 m	Aleksandr Fedotov	Mikoyan-Gurevich Ye-266M MiG-25	turbojet	Under Federation Aeronautique Internationale (FAI) classification the Ye-155 type						
1995	August 4	60,897 ft	18,561 m	2 pilots: Einar Enevoldson and other, and two scientists	Grob Strato 2C	propeller	crewed propeller monoplane record to date						
2001	August 14	96,863 ft	29,524 m	Uncrewed	NASA Helios HP01	propeller	Set altitude records for propeller driven aircraft, solar-electric aircraft, and highest altitude in horizontal flight by a winged aircraft.						
2004	October 4	367,490 ft	112,010 m	Brian Binnie	SpaceShipOne	air-launched rocket plane	In addition to the altitude record, this flight also set records for greatest mass lifted to altitude and minimum time between two consecutive flights in a reusable vehicle.						

=== Piston-driven propeller aeroplane ===
The highest altitude obtained by a piston-driven propeller UAV (without payload) is 20.430 kilometres (67,028 ft). It was obtained during 1988–1989 by the Boeing Condor UAV.

The highest altitude obtained in a piston-driven propeller biplane (without a payload) was 17.083 km (56,050 ft) on October 22, 1938, by Mario Pezzi at Montecelio, Italy in a Caproni Ca.161 driven by a Piaggio XI R.C. engine.

The highest altitude obtained in a piston-driven propeller monoplane (without a payload) was 18.552 km (60,870 ft) on August 4, 1995, by the Grob Strato 2C powered by two Teledyne Continental TSIOL-550 engines.

=== Jet aircraft ===
The highest current world absolute general aviation altitude record for air breathing jet-propelled aircraft is 37.650 kilometres (123,520 ft) set by Aleksandr Vasilyevich Fedotov in a Mikoyan-Gurevich E-266M (MiG-25M) on August 31, 1977.

=== Rocket plane ===
The record for highest altitude obtained by a crewed rocket-powered aircraft is the US Space Shuttle (STS) which regularly reached altitudes of more than 500 kilometres (310 mi) on servicing missions to the Hubble Space Telescope.

The highest altitude obtained by a crewed aeroplane (launched from another aircraft) is 112.010 km (367,490 ft) by Brian Binnie in the Scaled Composites SpaceShipOne (powered by a Scaled Composite SD-010 engine with 80,000 newtons (18,000 lbf) of thrust) on October 4, 2004, at Mojave, California. The SpaceShipOne was launched at over 13.3 km (44,000 ft).

The previous (unofficial) record was 107.960 km (354,200 ft) set by Joseph A. Walker in a North American X-15 in mission X-15 Flight 91 on August 22, 1963. Walker had reached 106 km – crossing the Kármán line the first time – with X-15 Flight 90 the previous month.

During the X-15 program, 8 pilots flew a combined 13 flights which met the Air Force spaceflight criterion by exceeding the altitude of 80 kilometres (50 mi), qualifying these pilots as being astronauts; of those 13 flights, two (flown by the same civilian pilot) met the FAI definition of outer space: 100 kilometres (62 mi).

==== Mixed power ====
The official record for a mixed power aircraft was achieved on May 2, 1958, by Roger Carpentier when he reached 24.217 km (79,450 ft) over Istres, France in a Sud-Ouest Trident II mixed power (turbojet & rocket engine) aircraft.

The unofficial altitude record for mixed-power-aircraft with self-powered takeoff was 36.8 km (120,800 ft) on December 6, 1963, by Major Robert W. Smith in a Lockheed NF-104A mixed power (turbojet and rocket engine) aircraft.

=== Electrically powered aircraft ===
The highest altitude obtained by an electrically powered aircraft is 29.524 kilometres (96,863 ft) on August 14, 2001, by the NASA Helios, and is the highest altitude in horizontal flight by a winged aircraft. This is also the altitude record for propeller driven aircraft, FAI class U (Experimental / New Technologies), and FAI class U-1.d (Remotely controlled UAV, weight 500 to 2,500 kg (1,100 to 5,500 lb)).

== Rotorcraft ==
On June 21, 1972, Jean Boulet of France piloted an Aérospatiale SA 315B Lama helicopter to an absolute altitude record of 12,440 metres (40,814 ft). At that extreme altitude, the engine flamed out and Boulet had to land the helicopter by breaking another record: the longest successful autorotation in history. The helicopter was stripped of all unnecessary equipment prior to the flight to minimize weight, and the pilot breathed supplemental oxygen.

== Paper airplanes ==
The highest altitude obtained by a paper plane was previously held by the Paper Aircraft Released Into Space (PARIS) project, which was released at an altitude of 27.307 kilometres (89,590 ft), from a helium balloon that was launched approximately 160 kilometres (99 mi) west of Madrid, Spain on October 28, 2010, and recorded by The Register's "special projects bureau". The project achieved a Guinness world record recognition.

This record was broken on 24 June 2015 in Cambridgeshire, UK by the Space Club of Kesgrave High School, Suffolk, as part of their Stratos III project. The paper plane was launched from a balloon at 35.043 kilometres (114,970 ft).

== Cannon rounds ==
The current world-record for highest cannon projectile flight is held by Project HARP’s 410 mm (16 in) space gun prototype, which fired a 180 kg (400 lb) Martlet 2 projectile to a record height of 180 kilometres (590,000 ft; 110 mi) in Yuma, Arizona, on November 18, 1966. The projectile’s trajectory sent it beyond the Kármán line at 100 km (62 mi), making it the first cannon-fired projectile to do so.

The Paris Gun (German: Paris-Geschütz) was a German long-range siege gun used to bombard Paris during World War I. It was in service from March–August 1918. Its 106-kilogram (234 lb) shells had a range of about 130 km (80 mi) with a maximum altitude of about 42.3 km (26.3 mi).

== See also ==
- Fédération Aéronautique Internationale
- High-altitude balloon
- High-altitude military parachuting
- High-altitude platform station

== Bibliography ==
- Andrews, C.F. and E.B. Morgan. Vickers Aircraft since 1908. London:Putnam, 1988. ISBN 0-85177-815-1.
- Angelucci, Enzo and Peter M. Bowers. The American Fighter. Sparkford, UK:Haynes Publishing Group, 1987. ISBN 0-85429-635-2.
- Bridgman, Leonard. Jane's All The World's Aircraft 1951–52. London: Sampson Low, Marston & Company, Ltd, 1951.
- "Eighteen Years of World's Records". Flight, February 7, 1924, pp. 73–75.
- Lewis, Peter. British Racing and Record-Breaking Aircraft. London:Putnam, 1971. ISBN 0-370-00067-6.
- Owers, Colin. "Stop-Gap Fighter:The LUSAC Series". Air Enthusiast, Fifty, May to July 1993. Stamford, UK:Key Publishing. ISSN 0143-5450. pp. 49–51.
- Taylor, John W. R. Jane's All The World's Aircraft 1965–66. London:Sampson Low, Marston & Company, 1965.
- "The Royal Aero Club of the U.K.: Official Notices to Members". Flight December 16, 1920.
