= Junkers Ju 49 =

German high-altitude research aircraft

Ju 49
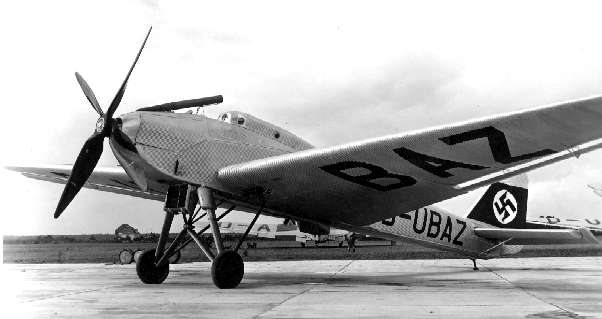
- Ju 49 with the L88a engine, the latter recognisable by its exhaust stack

General information
- Type: High-altitude research
- National origin: Germany
- Manufacturer: Junkers
- Primary user: Junkers
- Number built: 1

History
- Introduction date: 1931
- First flight: 2 October 1931
- Retired: 1937

The Junkers Ju 49 was a German aircraft designed to investigate high-altitude flight and the techniques of cabin pressurization. It was the world's second working pressurized aircraft, following the Engineering Division USD-9A which first flew in the United States in 1921. By 1935, it was flying regularly to around 12,500 m (41,000 ft).

== Development ==
The Junkers Ju 49 was developed entirely to investigate techniques for flight at high altitude. To this end, it had a specially developed engine and the first pressurized cabin in a German aircraft. The engine was the Junkers L88a, which combined two six-cylinder inline L8 motors into an upright V-12 and had a two-stage supercharger plus intercooler to sustain power at high altitudes. It produced 522 kW (700 hp) at about 5,800 m (19,000 ft). This engine drove a large four-blade propeller. The pressure cabin held the two crew. The original intention was for operation at about 6,000 m (20,000 ft).

The Ju 49 was built in typical Junkers fashion as a cantilever-wing monoplane of all-metal construction with stressed duralumin skin throughout, corrugated on the flying surfaces. The wing trailing edge featured the standard Junkers "double wing", combining adjustable flap and aileron surfaces outboard, together with plain flaps inboard. The aircraft had a fixed, split-axle main undercarriage which was noticeably tall, to accommodate the large-diameter propeller, plus a tailskid.

A retractable rectangular radiator descended between and just in front of the undercarriage legs. The pressurized cabin had five small portholes for the pilot, two forward, two sideways and one overhead, and there were two more, one on each side for the second crew member. The forward view was so poor that a periscope was fitted with a downward view for landing.

== Operational history ==
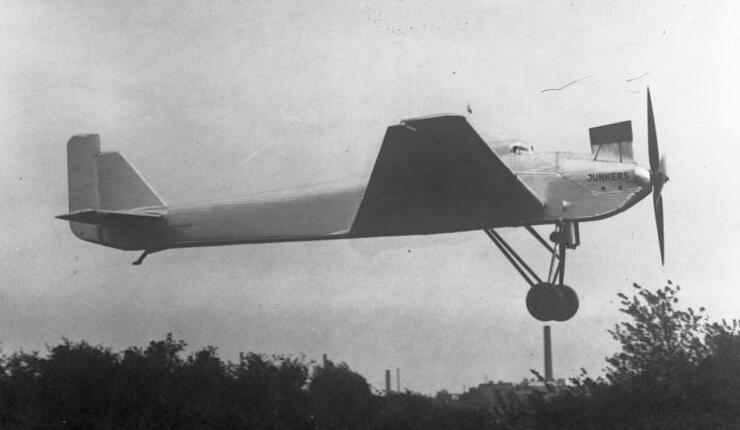
The Ju 49 showing the early L88 engine installation

The supercharged engine was not cleared for use at the time of the first flight on October 19 and the Ju 49 used instead the unsupercharged L88 version. Externally this installation was characterised by a tall, inline vertical stack of exhausts, unlike the single sloping pipe of the L88a. By summer 1932, the supercharged engine was flight-ready and installed, and the research program proper began. This was uneventful, with no serious engine or cabin problems.

Remarkably, given the initial target altitude of around 6,000 m (20,000 ft), by 1933 flights at 10,000 m (30,500 ft) were being made and by 1935 altitudes of 12,500 m (41,000 ft) were routine. No absolute records were set, but the experience gained fed into later pressurized aircraft, particularly the Ju 86P bombers and reconnaissance machines.

Only one Ju 49 was built, carrying the civil registration D2688 and later (when German civil registrations changed from numbers to letters) D-UBAZ. It ended its life at the German research centre (Deutsche Versuchsanstalt fur Luftfahrt) and crashed in October 1937.

== Historical significance ==
The late 1920s and the 1930s had seen an increased interest in the attainment of high altitudes and a stream of new absolute altitude records ensued. There were three approaches.

Use oxygen via a face mask, and endure hypoxia and extreme cold. Flyers like Cyril Uwins - 13,408 m (43,990 ft) in a Vickers Vespa in September 1932 - and Renato Donati - 14,433 m (47,385 ft) in a Caproni Ca 114 in late 1933 - took this route, sitting in open cockpits. Necessarily, these were up and down flights; continuous flight at high altitudes with this approach would not have been survivable.

Pressure suits: these were pioneered by Wiley Post in his Lockheed Vega 5C from September 1934 onwards. He was able ultimately to sustain flights of several hours at over 15,000 m (49,000 ft). Others used pressure suits to set records with up and down flights, like F.R. Swain (15,230 m or 49,970 ft) in the Bristol 138 in September 1936 and Mario Pezzi (17,083 m or 56,047 ft) in a Caproni Ca.161bis in October 1938. Post's work showed sustained high-altitude flight was possible, but pressure suits were uncomfortable and restrictive.

Ultimately, the pressure cabin, insulated from the cold or heated was the way to allow crew and, eventually, passengers to travel in a normal environment.

== Operators ==
Germany

- Deutsche Versuchsanstalt fur Luftfahrt

== Specifications (with L88a) ==
Data from Turner & Nowarra 1971, p. 70

General characteristics

- Crew: 2
- Length: 17.21 m (56 ft 5.5 in)
- Wingspan: 28.24 m (92 ft 8 in)
- Wing area: 98.0 m^{2} (1,055 sq ft)
- Empty weight: 3,590 kg (7,916 lb)
- Gross weight: 4,250 kg (9,371 lb)
- Powerplant: 1 × Junkers L88a V-12 cylinder with two-stage supercharger , 596 kW (800 hp)

Performance

- Maximum speed: 146 km/h (91 mph, 79 kn) at sea level; 220 km/h (136 mph) at 13,000 m (42,700 ft)
- Service ceiling: 13,015 m (42,700 ft)
- Rate of climb: 3.5 m/s (690 ft/min) to 8,000 m (26,250 ft)

== See also ==
Aircraft of comparable role, configuration, and era

- Bristol Type 138
- Farman F.1000
- Lockheed XC-35
