= Mario Pezzi (aviator) =

Italian aviator

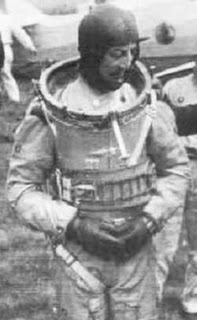
- Pezzi in his high-altitude pressure suit
- Born: November 9, 1898; Fossano, Cuneo, Italy
- Died: August 26, 1968 (aged 69)
- Military career
- Branch: Royal Italian Army (1917–1923); Royal Italian Air Force (1923–1943); Italian Co-belligerent Air Force (1943–1946); Italian Air Force (1946–1968)
- Units: 60th Infantry Regiment "Calabria" (1917–1918); 134th Squadron (1918–1919); 1st Experimental Center (1936–1940)

Mario Pezzi (9 November 1898 – 26 August 1968) was an Italian aviator and military officer known worldwide for his 1937 record flight, in which he achieved greater height than any other pilot in a propeller-powered airplane.

== Biography ==
Pezzi was born on 9 November 1898. He had one brother, Enrico, who also grew up to be a general in the Regia Aeronautica (Royal Italian Air Force).

Mario joined the Royal Italian Army in October 1917, serving as part of the 60th Infantry Regiment "Calabria" and being promoted to second lieutenant the following year. He received his pilot's license in 1926. The next year, he became part of the general staff, rising to Cabinet of the Ministry of Defence in 1931.

After Pezzi's record flight, he was decorated with the Gold Medal of Aeronautic Valor and promoted to colonel. He also later became Commander of Aeronautics as well as Chief of the General Staff. From 1950 to 1955, Pezzi worked as Head of Cabinet of the Ministry of Defense and, subsequently, General Secretary of Aeronautics.

Pezzi is considered an aeronautics and astronautics pioneer in Italy not only for his altitude records: he was also the man who chose Luigi Broglio to lead the Italian Air Force Ammunition Research Unit, responsible for rocket and missile research, leading the way to future space exploration in Italy. Broglio himself described his meeting with Pezzi: "In 1956, Secretary General of the ITAF Pezzi, the man famous for his altitude flight records, asked me to replace the officer responsible for the ITAF Ammunition Research Unit, a branch of the Service dealing with rockets and missiles too. I answered that it was not my field, my field being airplanes, not rockets. Pezzi objected: 'Then give me the name of some top brass who is expert in that field'. I answered again no, I did not know anyone with such a capability. 'Well, then the job is yours' was Pezzi's conclusion."

== Record flight ==
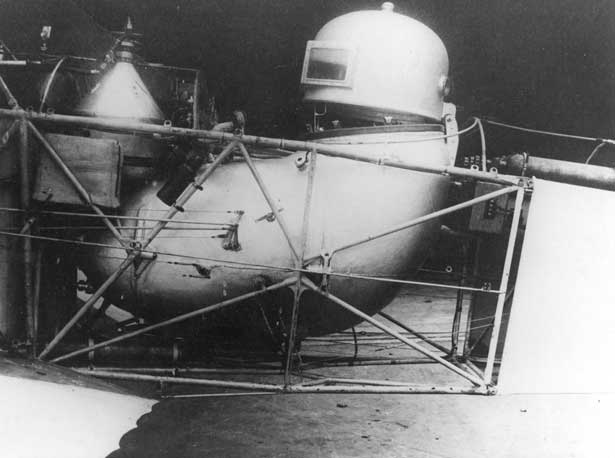
The Ca.161's pressurized cockpit

Pezzi established his record on 22 October 1938 above Guidonia Montecelio aboard a Caproni Ca.161bis biplane with a Piaggio P.XI R.C.100/2v engine and cocoon-like pressurised cabin, wearing a special flight suit ^{picture} and reaching a height of 17,083 m (56,047 ft). This record still stands today.

On 8 May 1937, Pezzi took off from the Guidonia Montecelio air base in a Caproni Ca.161 (then equipped with a 750 hp (560 kW) P.XI R.C.72 engine), climbing to 15,655 m (51,362 ft). Pezzi wore a special electrically heated pressurized suit and an airtight helmet, just like a modern astronaut. At Caproni, work went on ceaselessly to produce a new version of the aircraft, the Ca.161bis, designed by engineer Rodolfo Verduzio. It was in the Ca.161bis that Pezzi's ultimate record was established.

=== Earlier record attempts by others ===
- In 1934, another Italian pilot, Renato Donati, reached 14,433 m (47,352 ft) in a Caproni Ca.113 powered by a Bristol Pegasus engine.
- In 1936, Englishman Ronald Swain reached 15,230 m (49,970 ft) in a Bristol Type 138.
- Another Englishman, M.J. Adam, piloted a Bristol Type 138 to 16,440 m (53,940 ft).
