= Walter Gibb =

British RAF officer (1919-2006)

- Born: 26 March 1919; Port Talbot, Wales
- Died: 4 October 2006 (aged 87)
- Spouse: Sylvia Reed (m. 1944)
- Children: 3
- Military career
- Allegiance: United Kingdom
- Branch: Royal Air Force
- Service years: 1940–1946
- Rank: Wing Commander
- Commands: No. 239 Squadron (1944–45)
- Conflicts: Second World War
- Awards: Distinguished Service Order; Distinguished Flying Cross
- Other work: Test pilot

Walter Gibb, DSO, DFC (26 March 1919 – 4 October 2006) was a Royal Air Force (RAF) flying ace and a British test pilot who twice held the world altitude record.

== Early life ==
The son of a Scottish mining Engineer, Walter Frame Gibb was born near Port Talbot, Wales, on 26 March 1919. He attended Clifton College before joining the aero-engine Division of the BAC (Bristol Aeroplane Company) as an apprentice mechanic in 1937, before joining the RAF in May 1940 as a pilot.

== Fighter pilot ==
Upon completing his training at FTS Cranwell, he was identified as an above average pilot and was posted as a flight instructor at CFS, South Cerney in 1941. He also instructed at 54 OTU until June 1942, before attachment to No. 125 Squadron in February and March 1942. In early 1943 he joined No. 264 Squadron, flying the de Havilland Mosquito on long-range sorties in support of Coastal Command over the Bay of Biscay.

On 22 March 1943 he shared in the destruction of a Junkers Ju 88 with another Mosquito. His squadron also saw action over Northern France in the lead-up to the Invasion in 1944. He also scored several train kills during these sorties.

Transferred to No. 605 Squadron as a Flight Commander, Gibb and his flight provided support for Dam Busters during a raid on the Dortmund-Ems canal. On 14 September 1943 flying ahead of the Lancaster force, his Mosquitoes reported bad weather conditions and the mission was aborted until 15 September. Gibb's Squadron suppressed the light flak and searchlights en route to aid the low flying Lancaster bombers.

Gibb then served for a short time with 1692 BSDU. He was promoted to wing commander and was given command of No. 239 Squadron in No. 100 Group, flying bomber support missions into Germany in 1945. He claimed five enemy night fighter aircraft shot down. Despite this modest score, Gibb accounted for the victory of Walter Borchers on 6 March 1945. Borchers had scored 43 air victories at the time of his death. On 18/19 March 1945 Gibb shot down another German night fighter ace. Werner Baake and his radar operator survived. Gibb was awarded the Distinguished Service Order in May 1945, and left the RAF in January 1946.

== Test pilot ==
After the war, he became a test pilot for BAC. Walter was the co-pilot for Bill Pegg during the Bristol Brabazon's maiden flight, and then flew it with himself in command, during which the large aircraft suffered hydraulic failure, and made an emergency landing without flaps. The aircraft development programme was later scrapped in 1953.

Gibb and observer FM Piper, took off from Filton near Bristol on 4 May 1953 in an English Electric Canberra bomber. Climbing to the west the Canberra reached an altitude of 63,668 feet (19,406 m); some 4,000 feet (1,200 m) higher than the previous record. That year he was awarded the gold medal of the Royal Aero Club.

Gibb became the chief test pilot for BAC in 1955.

Flying the a Canberra fitted with more powerful Olympus engines Gibb made an attempt to break his own record on 29 August 1955. Taking off from Filton he climbed over the Bristol Channel towards Ireland and levelled off at 50,000 ft in order to burn off fuel to lighten the aircraft before continuing his ascent. He turned east and finally reached a record altitude of 65,876 ft (nearly 12.5 miles high) over Bristol. He flew his Canberra up to this record height knowing he would possibly pass out due to the altitude, but would regain consciousness to safely land his Canberra.

In 1955 he test flew the Bristol Britannia turbo-prop airliner. Despite some mechanical difficulties, he flew from Bristol to Johannesburg, South Africa, refuelling once in Khartoum, the trip taking 19 hours. He trained airline pilots in the Britannia, and retired from Test Flying in 1960.

He then became Head of Service and Technical Support for the British Aircraft Company, and later became Chairman for British Aerospace Australia in 1978.

== Personal life ==
Walter married Sylvia Reed, whom he met during his RAF service. She was a flight officer at the operations room at RAF North Weald. They married in 1944 and had three daughters. Walter was a member of the Thornbury Sailing Club, sailing until the age of 83. He was twice the club's commodore, long serving vice-president, and later became the club president.
