= Apollo Soucek =

U.S. Navy vice admiral and test pilot (1897–1955)

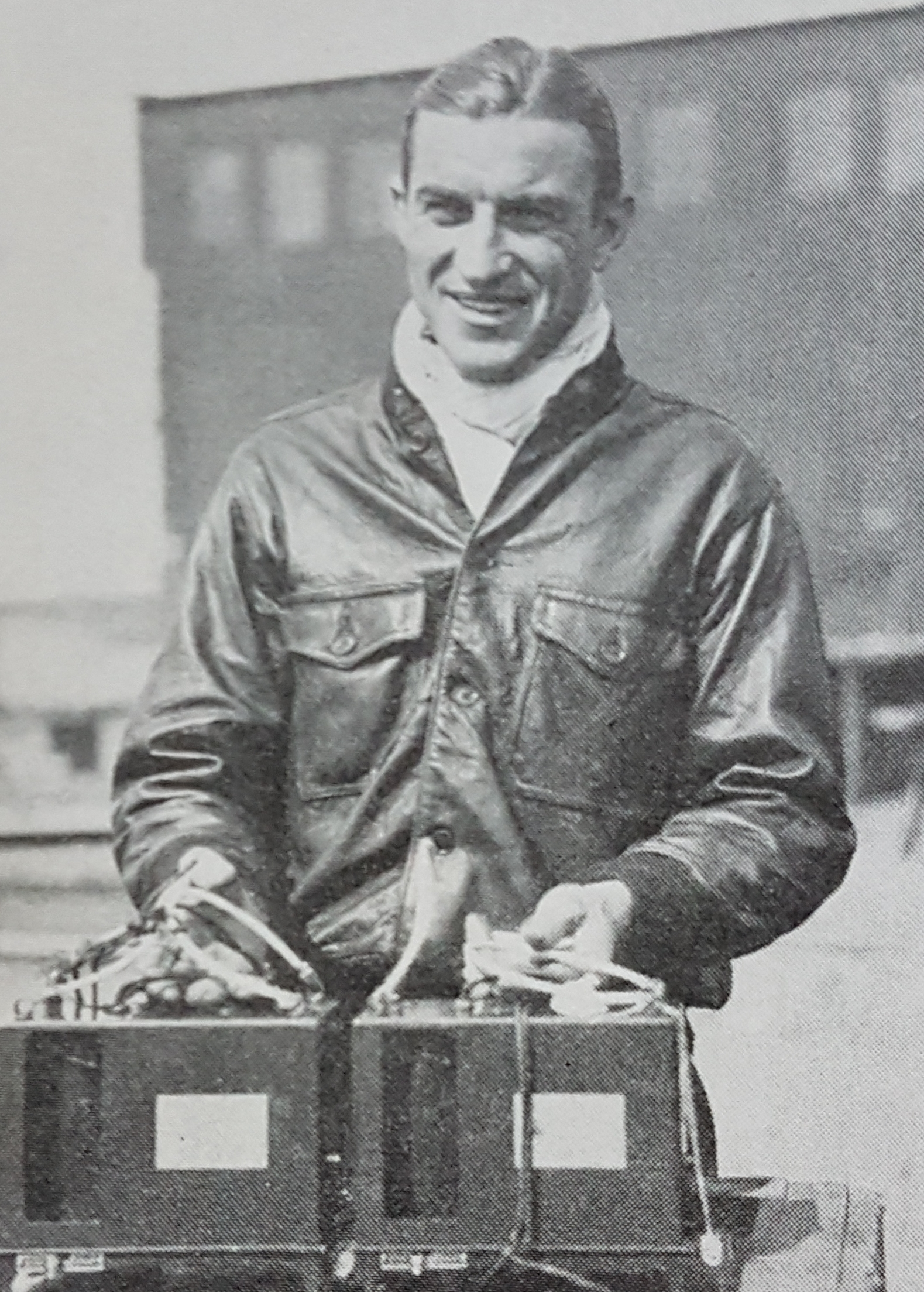
- Apollo Soucek
- Born: February 24, 1897; Lamont, Territory of Oklahoma
- Died: July 22, 1955 (aged 58); Washington, D.C., U.S.
- Burial place: Arlington National Cemetery
- Military career
- Allegiance: United States of America
- Branch: United States Navy
- Service years: 1918–1955
- Rank: Vice admiral
- Nickname: Sockem
- Commands: Fighting Squadron 2 USS Franklin D. Roosevelt (CV-42); Carrier Division 3/Task Force 77
- Conflicts: World War I World War II; Korean War
- Awards: Distinguished Service Medal; Silver Star; Legion of Merit (2); Distinguished Flying Cross; Bronze Star Medal

Apollo Soucek (February 24, 1897 – July 22, 1955) was a vice admiral in the United States Navy, who was a record-breaking test pilot during 1929 and 1930, served in World War II, and was commander of Carrier Division Three during the Korean War, ending his career as chief of the Bureau of Aeronautics.

== Biography ==
Soucek was born in Lamont, Oklahoma. He was the son of Jan "John" Souček, who had been born in Ovčáry, Bohemia (then part of Austria-Hungary, now in the Czech Republic), but had emigrated to the United States at the age of 7 with his family. Arriving in June 1875 aboard the Norddeutscher Lloyd ship SS Ohio, the family—Mathias, Maria, and their six children—first settled in Nebraska, then moved to Kansas, before taking part in the Cherokee Strip Land Run in 1893 and settling in Medford.

=== Early career ===
Soucek entered the United States Naval Academy in 1918 and served with the rank of midshipman aboard the battleship Missouri (BB-11) during World War I. He was commissioned as an ensign on 3 June 1921. He then served aboard the Mississippi (BB-41). In February 1924, Soucek reported to Naval Air Station Pensacola for flight training, qualifying as a naval aviator in October. He was assigned to the Navy's first aircraft carrier Langley (CV-1) in November, and served as assistant flight officer of Observation Squadron 2. In January 1925, he transferred to the Maryland (BB-46) to serve as assistant navigator and junior aviation officer of Observation Squadron 1. In May 1927, he was assigned to the Naval Aircraft Factory in Philadelphia, before transferring to the Bureau of Aeronautics in July to serve in the Power Plant Design Section.

Flying the Wright Apache, Soucek set a series of flight altitude records. On May 8, 1929, he set the world altitude record for landplanes by flying to the height of 39,140 feet (11,930 m), and on June 4, he set the altitude record for seaplanes, also in an Apache, reaching the height of 38,560 feet (11,750 m). On June 4, 1930, Soucek flew an Apache landplane equipped with a 450 horsepower (340 kW) Pratt & Whitney R-1340 radial engine to a height of 43,166 feet (13,157 m) over Naval Air Station Anacostia, regaining the world record he had held in 1929. Soucek received the Distinguished Flying Cross for these flights.

In June 1930, Soucek returned to sea duty, serving as squadron flight officer of Fighter Squadron 3 on the carrier Lexington (CV-2), and as gunnery officer and executive officer of Fighter Squadron 3 aboard Saratoga (CV-3). In June 1932, he returned to the Naval Aircraft Factory to serve as assistant to the superintendent of the Aeronautical Engineering Laboratory. From June 1935, he served as hangar deck, flight deck, and senior watch officer aboard Ranger (CV-4), returning to the Lexington in June 1937 to serve as the commanding officer of Fighter Squadron 2. Soucek went back to the Bureau of Aeronautics in May 1938 to serve as assistant to the chief of the Personnel Division.

=== World War II ===
In May 1940, he was assigned to Yorktown (CV-5) as navigator, moving to the Hornet (CV-8) on October 20, 1941, to serve as air officer. Soucek was appointed executive officer in 1942, and served in that capacity during the Doolittle Raid on Tokyo on April 18 and during the Battle of the Santa Cruz Islands. He was later awarded the Silver Star for his efforts during this battle.

In January 1943, he was appointed assistant chief of staff for operations in the Pacific Fleet. From July 1943, he served as chief of staff and aide to the chief of Naval Air Intermediate Training Command and deputy chief of Naval Air Training, based at NAS Pensacola. Soucek was awarded the Legion of Merit with Gold Star for his service in this capacity. In March 1945, he was appointed officer-in-charge of the fitting-out of the carrier Franklin D. Roosevelt (CV-42), becoming the first commander on her commissioning on October 27, 1945.

=== Later career ===
From January 1946, he commanded Carrier Division 14, and from August was commander of Fleet Air Wing 1. On July 15, 1947, he was appointed commander of the Naval Air Test Center at Naval Air Station Patuxent River. From 1949, he served as assistant chief of Naval Operations for Aviation Plans, and director of the Aviation Plans and Program Division. He spent most of 1951 in London as U.S. naval attaché for air, before serving in the Office of the Chief of Naval Operations from November until February 1952, when he was appointed commander of Carrier Division 3/Task Force 77, flying his flag aboard Boxer (CV-21), supporting operations in the Korean War. Rear Admiral Soucek received the Distinguished Service Medal for his service in Korea.

On June 18, 1953, Soucek was appointed chief of the Bureau of Aeronautics. However, in February 1955 he became ill, quitting his post on March 4, and was transferred to the Retired List on July 1.

He died of a heart attack on July 19, 1955, at the age of 58, and was buried at Arlington National Cemetery on 26 July. He was posthumously promoted to vice admiral.

On June 4, 1957, Naval Air Station Oceana was officially named Apollo Soucek Field.

== Family ==
Apollo's younger brother Zeus (1899–1967), also joined the Navy, became an aviator, and set speed, distance and duration records piloting a Naval Aircraft Factory PN-12 in May 1928.

== Decorations ==

Naval Aviator Badge
1st Row	Navy Distinguished Service Medal	Silver Star		Legion of Merit with Gold Star
2nd Row	Distinguished Flying Cross	Bronze Star Medal with Combat "V"	World War I Victory Medal with Atlantic Fleet Clasp	China Service Medal
3rd Row	American Defense Service Medal	Asiatic–Pacific Campaign Medal with three service stars	American Campaign Medal	World War II Victory Medal
4th Row	Navy Occupation Medal	National Defense Service Medal	Korean Service Medal with two service stars	United Nations Korea Medal
