= Bristol Type 138 =

British high-altitude research aircraft

Type 138 High Altitude Monoplane
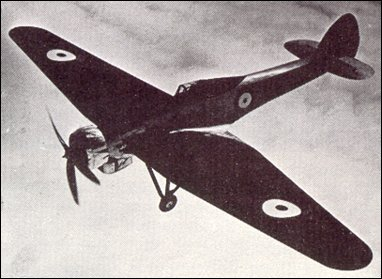
- The Type 138A over Farnborough c. 1937

General information
- Type: High-altitude research aircraft
- Manufacturer: Bristol Aeroplane Company
- Designer: Frank Barnwell
- Primary user: Royal Aircraft Establishment
- Number built: 1 (+1 Type 138B airframe not completed)

History
- First flight: 11 May 1936

The Bristol Type 138 High Altitude Monoplane was a British high-altitude single-engine, low-wing monoplane research aircraft developed and produced by the Bristol Aeroplane Company during the 1930s. It set nine world altitude records, with the maximum altitude achieved being 53,937 ft (16,440 m) on 30 June 1937, during a 2¼-hour flight.

A second aircraft, designated as the Type 138B, was ordered in 1935 but work was abandoned during 1937 without it having flown.

== Development ==
The Type 138 was built during a period of intense competition between aviation manufacturers. Prestige and useful technological progress came from breaking major aviation records, such as airspeed, distance and altitude but by the 1930s, the resources and development work necessary to achieve these records was beyond individual companies, and required government assistance.

Bristol found themselves lagging behind other companies from Germany, Italy, the United States, and the United Kingdom. Between 1929 and 1934, altitude records established by rival aircraft included those set by a Junkers W.34, a Vickers Vespa and a Caproni Ca.113 biplane, as well as the first flight over Everest by a pair of Westland Wallaces in 1933. All of these aircraft had been powered by Bristol engines. Between 1928 and 1938, the altitude record was broken 10 times, once using a Jupiter engine and five times using Pegasus engines which was seen as a major achievement for Bristol's engines.

In November 1933, having observed British Air Ministry interest following the success of the Everest flight, aeronautical engineer Frank Barnwell proposed a purpose-built high-altitude research aircraft. This proposal, designated the Type 138, was a large single-engine, single-seat monoplane, equipped with a retractable undercarriage and a supercharged Pegasus radial engine. Nothing came of this until Italian pilot Renato Donati achieved a new world record during April 1934 prompting public opinion to swing in favour of a government-sponsored record attempt. In June 1934, the Air Ministry issued Specification 2/34, for a pair of prototypes capable of reaching an altitude of 50,000 ft (15,240 m). Bristol was among the companies which were invited to tender proposals.

Barnwell revised the Type 138 proposal, producing the Type 138A whose size and configuration remained the same, but the retractable undercarriage was replaced with a fixed design to reduce weight and it would be powered by a two-stage supercharged Pegasus engine and provision for an observer was made. Using the Pegasus was expected to generate publicity and boost sales.

Considerable research was carried out by both the Royal Aircraft Establishment (RAE) and National Physical Laboratory to fine tune the design of the aircraft, as well as to develop a reliable pressure suit to be worn by the pilot. Sir Robert Davis of Siebe Gorman and Professor J.S. Haldane were instrumental in developing the helmet. During tests, the pressure suit was tested to the equivalent altitude of 80,000 ft (24,384 m).

In early 1936, the airframe was completed and on 11 May 1936 the Type 138A was flown for the first time by Cyril Uwins, Bristol's chief test pilot, who had previously flown the Vickers Vespa on its world record flight. As the engine was not ready, it was powered by a standard Pegasus IV driving a three-bladed propeller for the early flights. Two additional flights were performed at Filton prior to the aircraft being delivered to the RAE at Farnborough where the pressure helmet was tested prior to the aircraft being returned to Filton for the installation of the special Pegasus engine and a four-blade propeller. On 5 September 1936, the Type 138A returned to Farnborough for more test flights.

== Design ==
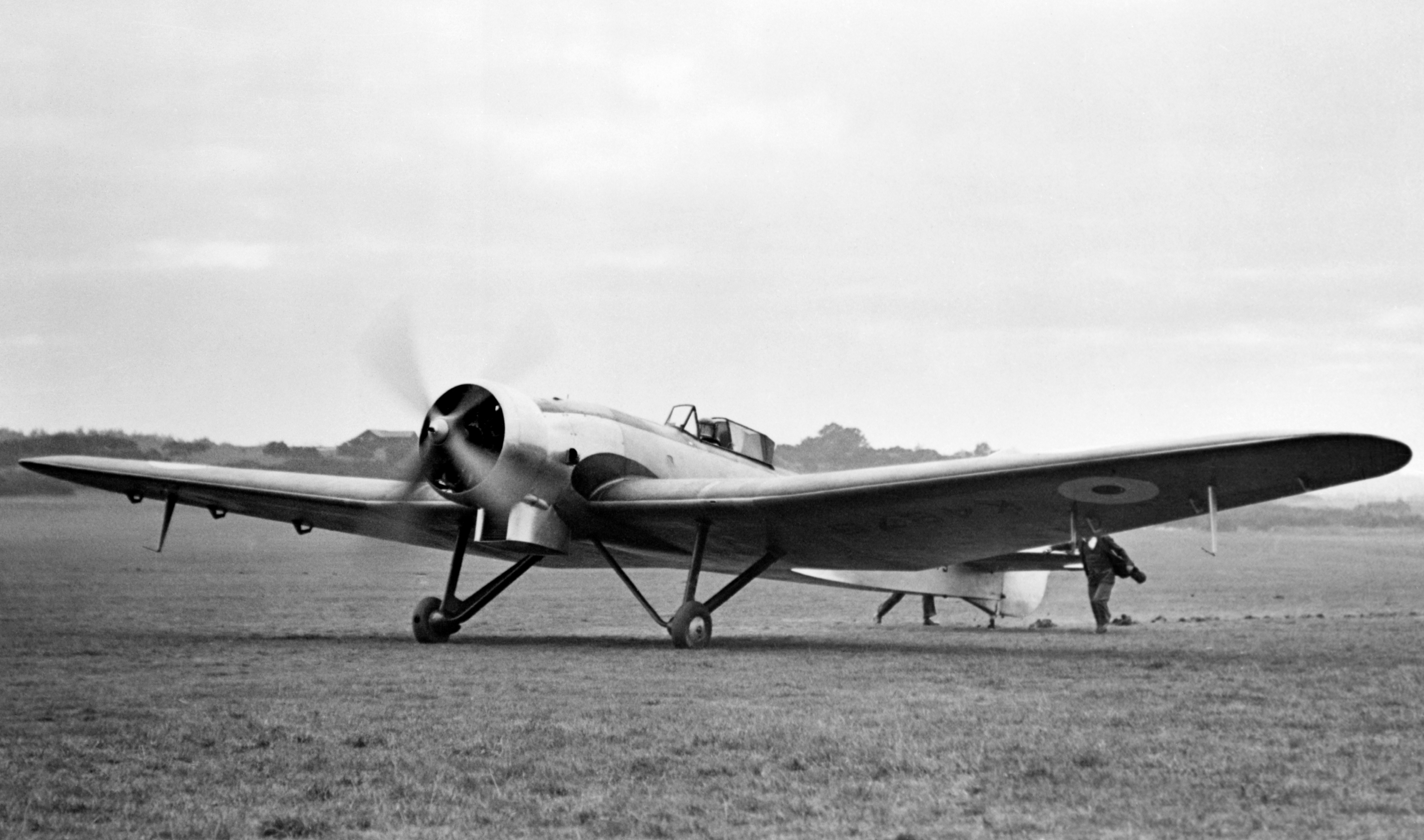
Bristol 138A taxiing with the special high altitude Pegasus engine.

The Bristol 138 was a low-wing cantilever monoplane designed to fly at extremely high altitudes for the era. Aviation publication 'Flight observed of the aircraft that: "except for its size, reminds one very much of the little Bristol Brownie.... the machine is the largest single-seater aeroplane ever built". The pilot was seated in a spacious cockpit, which was heated by air directed from the oil coolers set within the wings, which could be adjusted. Instrumentation included fore-and-aft levels, oil pressure gauges, airspeed indicator and fuel gauge, engine speed indicator and a pyrometer. Purpose-built recording altimeters, developed by the RAE, were housed within the wings, while a separate altimeter was installed in the cockpit.

The 138 was powered by a single Bristol Pegasus engine fitted with a high pressure two-stage supercharger, which was critical in enabling the engine to deliver the required performance at altitude. The first-stage compressor was permanently engaged, while a clutch was used to manually engage the second-stage on attaining the correct altitude, which was needed to avoid an excessive charge when flown at low altitudes. It employed an intercooler between the first and second stages.

Weight saving was a priority and the airframe, other than the steel tube engine mount and cowling, used a wood shell. It with a plywood skin glued to the mahogany longerons and struts that formed the internal structure, which was faired throughout to reduce drag. A conventional fixed undercarriage was used as it was more important to reduce the weight than the drag, and a retractable undercarriage would have been counterproductive. The wings were constructed in three sections with a centre section integral with the fuselage. Three spars with plywood webs and mahogany flanges were used, covered with plywood sheeting.

In order to cope with the extreme altitudes, the pilot used a specially developed two-piece suit. This was principally made up of rubberised fabric joined at the waist using a type of pipe-clip. It was provided with a helmet, which featured a large forward window to provide a view. It was completed with closed-circuit breathing apparatus with oxygen being delivered via a small injector jet to provide air circulation. Exhaled air travelled via an external tube to a canister containing carbon dioxide-absorbing chemicals to restore it prior to it returning to the pilot again. The 138 had an internal fuel capacity of 82 imp gal (370 L; 98 US gal), split between a 70 imp gal (320 L; 84 US gal) lower tank and a 12 imp gal (55 L; 14 US gal) upper tank. A specially developed fuel, known as S.A.F.4, was used for the altitude record flight, derived from standard grade Shell Ethyl aviation gasoline. Of note, this fuel has a high anti-knock value; the high degree of supercharge involved results in the fuel mixture reaching high temperatures, which generally increases the potential for detonation, thus a high anti-knock value was viewed to be of critical importance.

== Operational history ==
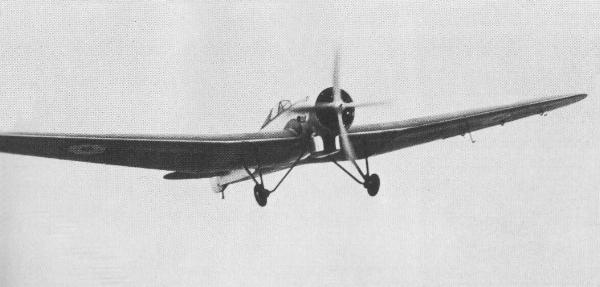
Bristol 138 in flight

Squadron Leader F.R.D. Swain, who had joined the experimental division of the RAE in 1933, was selected to pilot the high-altitude flights. Both the general research programme and preparations for the first record altitude flight were undertaken under the direction of Mr H. E. Wimperis, the Director of Scientific Research at the Air Ministry.

On 28 September 1936, Swain took off from Farnborough in the Type 138A; he climbed to an indicated altitude of 51,000 ft (16,000 m), during which he engaged the auxiliary supercharger at 35,000 ft (10,668 m). Swain ran low on oxygen on the two-hour flight and had to break the window of his pressure helmet after descending to a safe height. The data from this flight were recognised by the Fédération Aéronautique Internationale as a world record of 49,967 ft (15,230 m).

After this flight, further development work resulted in a number of small modifications to the aircraft, the typical objective of these being weight savings and improving the performance of the supercharger. In this mildly revised form, the Type 138A conducted six further flights, achieving a maximum altitude of around 50,000 ft (15,000 m). During this period, Italy had been able to recapture the record, achieving a recorded maximum altitude of 51,364 ft (15,656 m). In response, on 30 June 1937, Flight Lieutenant M.J. Adam undertook a 2¼-hour flight in which he achieved a record altitude which was certified as 53,937 ft (16,440 m) despite the canopy suffering a major crack during the flight, and Adam was protected from injury by his pressure suit and helmet.

Research flights continued, but there were no further attempts to break records. According to the British aerospace company BAE Systems, the test flights had resulted in invaluable flight data being obtained, particularly in the field of pressurisation.

During 1935, a second machine was ordered, designated the Type 138B. This was to be a two-seater powered by a Rolls-Royce Kestrel S engine, fitted with a similar two-stage supercharger installation, enabling it to generate 500 hp (370 kW). In 1937, the airframe was delivered to Farnborough Airfield for completion, but the engine was never installed, and the 138B was used as a ground instructional trainer instead, and never flown.

== Variants ==
Type 138
Not built.

Type 138A
One built

Type 138B
One built to use a Rolls-Royce Kestrel S engine, never flown and became a ground instructional aircraft

== Operators ==
United Kingdom

- Royal Air Force

== Specifications (138A) ==
Data from Bristol Aircraft since 1910, BAE Systems

General characteristics

- Crew: One
- Length: 44 ft 0 in (13.41 m)
- Wingspan: 66 ft 0 in (20.12 m)
- Height: 10 ft 3 in (3.12 m)
- Wing area: 568 sq ft (52.8 m^{2})
- Empty weight: 4,391 lb (1,992 kg)
- Gross weight: 5,310 lb (2,409 kg)
- Fuel capacity: 82 imp gal (370 L; 98 US gal)
- Powerplant: 1 × Bristol Pegasus P.E.6S 9-cylinder air-cooled radial piston engine, 500 hp (370 kW) super-charged with intercooler
- Propellers: 4-bladed fixed-pitch propeller

Performance

- Maximum speed: 123 mph (198 km/h, 107 kn)
- Endurance: 2 hours 15 minutes
- Service ceiling: 54,000 ft (16,000 m)
- Rate of climb: 7.27 ft/min (0.0369 m/s) at 40,000 ft (12,000 m)
- Wing loading: 9.35 lb/sq ft (45.7 kg/m^{2})
- Power/mass: 0.0942 hp/lb (0.1549 kW/kg)

== See also ==
Aircraft of comparable role, configuration, and era

- Junkers Ju 49
- Caproni Ca.161

Related lists

- List of aircraft of the Royal Air Force
- List of experimental aircraft
