= Ronald Swain =

Royal Air Force Air Commodore (1903-1989)

- Swain in 1936
- Born: 31 August 1903; Southsea, Hampshire, England
- Died: 28 September 1989 (aged 86); Gainesville, Florida, United States
- Spouse: Sarah Mitchell LeFevre
- Military career
- Allegiance: United Kingdom
- Branch: Royal Air Force
- Service years: 1922–1954
- Rank: Air Commodore
- Units: No. 2 Squadron RAF; No. 11 Squadron RAF; No. 23 Squadron RAF; No. 6 Squadron RAF
- Commands: No. 28 Group RAF (1949–50); No. 13 Base (1944–45); RAF Kinloss (1943); No. 1 Squadron RAF (1937)
- Conflicts: Second World War
- Awards: Companion of the Order of the Bath; Commander of the Order of the British Empire; Air Force Cross; Mentioned in Dispatches

Air Commodore Francis Ronald Downs Swain, CB, CBE, AFC (31 August 1903 – 28 September 1989) was a British Royal Air Force pilot who held the World Altitude Record for airplanes from 1936 to 1938.

== Early life and career ==
Swain was born on 31 August 1903 and was the fourth and youngest child of Charles Swain and Rose Downs. He grew up in Portsmouth and joined the RAF in 1922, becoming a member of No. 2 Squadron RAF as a pilot. He was quickly transferred to No. 11 Squadron, subsequently spending time with No. 23 Squadron and No. 6 Squadron as a Flight Commander, commanding the Cairo-Rhodesia Flight in 1933.

== World altitude record ==
In 1935, now with the rank of squadron leader, Swain became a test pilot in the experimental section at the Royal Aircraft Establishment (RAE) where he was involved in high-altitude experiments. Departing from Farnborough, Hampshire at 07:30 on 28 September 1936, Swain achieved a fixed-wing aircraft's world altitude record with a height of 49,967 ft in a modified Bristol Type 138A. During his descent, his pressure suit failed causing him to lose visibility through his visor and find it difficult to breathe. He was forced to cut his visor open with his knife in order to maintain consciousness, eventually landing safely at Netheravon, Wiltshire at 10:30.

== Later career ==
In 1937, Swain left the RAE to command No. 1 Squadron. He then attended the RAF Staff College in 1938, and spent the Second World War and his remaining career in various staff positions. His last appointment was SASO/Deputy Head of the Air Staff, British Joint Services Mission, Washington, D.C., retiring from the RAF in 1954 with the rank of Air Commodore.

== Personal life ==
Swain married American Sarah Mitchell Le Fevre in Portsmouth on 5 November 1938, going on to have three children together. He died in Gainesville, Florida on 28 September 1989.
