= Caproni Ca.161 =

Italian experimental high-altitude aircraft

Ca 161
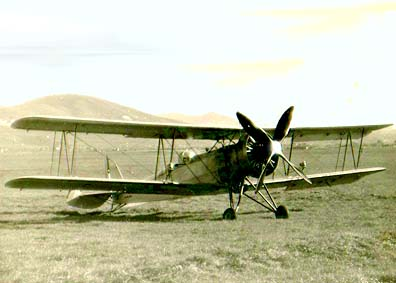

General information
- Type: High-altitude experimental aircraft
- Manufacturer: Caproni
- Designer: Rodolfo Verduzio

History
- First flight: 1936

The Caproni Ca.161 was an aircraft built in Italy in 1936, in an attempt to set a new world altitude record. It was a conventional biplane with two-bay, staggered wings of equal span, based on Caproni's Ca.113 design. The pressure-suited pilot was accommodated in an open cockpit.

== Operational history ==
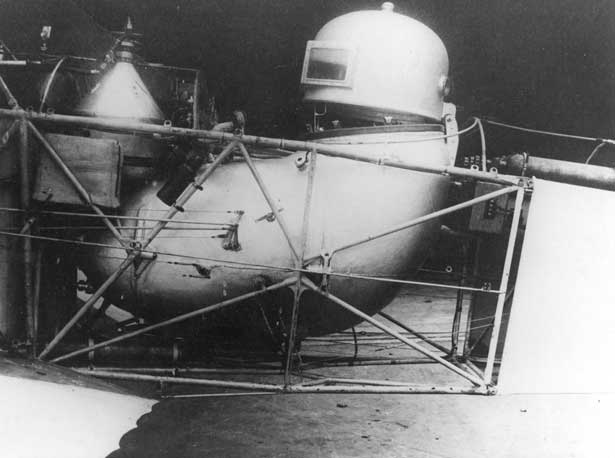
Ca.161's pressurized pilot suit.

On 8 May 1937, Lieutenant Colonel Mario Pezzi broke the world altitude record with a flight to 15,655 m (51,362 ft). The following year, Pezzi broke the record again in the more powerful Ca.161bis, making a flight to 17,083 m (56,047 ft) on 22 October 1938. The Grob Strato 2C broke this record for piston-powered crewed airplanes generally in 1995, but as of 2024 it still stands for piston-powered biplanes, and for crewed single-engine piston aircraft.

A final altitude record for floatplanes was set on 25 September 1939 in the float-equipped Ca.161Idro, piloted by Nicola di Mauro to 13,542 m (44,429 ft). As of 2024, this record also still stands.

== Variants ==
- Ca.161 – original version with Piaggio P.XI R.C.72 engine
- Ca.161bis – improved version with Piaggio P.XI R.C.100/2v
- Ca.161Idro – floatplane version

== Specifications (Ca.161bis) ==
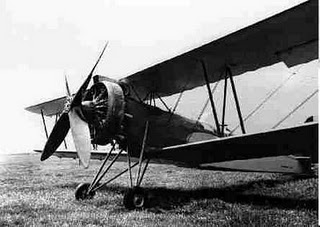

Data from Italian Civil and Military Aircraft 1930–1945 apart from weights

General characteristics

- Crew: one, pilot
- Length: 8.25 m (27 ft 1 in)
- Wingspan: 14.25 m (46 ft 9 in)
- Height: 3.50 m (11 ft 6 in)
- Wing area: 35.5 m^{2} (382 sq ft)
- Empty weight: 1,205 kg (2,657 lb)
- Gross weight: 1,650 kg (3,638 lb)
- Powerplant: 1 × Piaggio P.XI R.C.100/2v 14-cylinder radial driving a 4-blade propeller , 560 kW (750 hp)

Performance

- Maximum speed: 100 km/h (60 mph, 52 kn)
- Service ceiling: 17,083 m (56,047 ft)
- Rate of climb: 10.3 m/s (2,020 ft/min)

== See also ==
Aircraft of comparable role, configuration, and era

- Bristol Type 138
- Caproni Ca.113
- Junkers Ju 49
- Potez 506
