= Cyril Uwins =

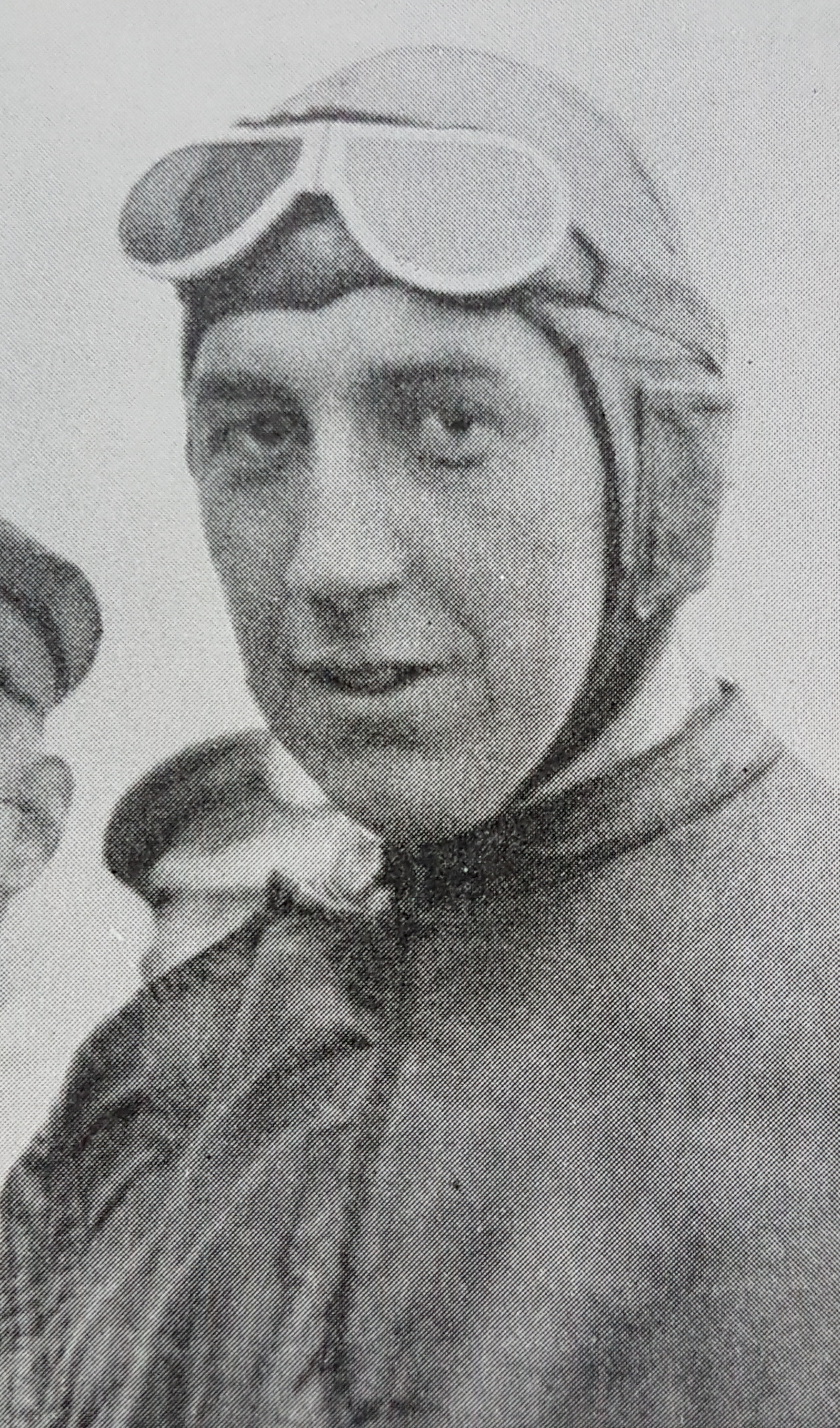
- Born: Cyril Frank Uwins; 2 August 1896; South Norwood, England
- Died: 11 September 1972 (aged 76); Bath, England
- Occupation: Test pilot
- Awards: Air Force Cross; Order of the British Empire
- Aviation career
- Rank: Flight lieutenant

Cyril Frank Uwins OBE, AFC, FRAeS (1896–1972) was a British test pilot who worked for Bristol Aeroplane Company, where he made the first flight of 58 types of aircraft. On 16 September 1932 he broke the world aeroplane height record by climbing to 43,976 ft (13,404 m) (nearly 8 1/2 miles). He eventually became the Deputy Chairman of Bristol Aircraft. He was also Chairman of the Society of British Aircraft Manufacturer between 1956 and 1958, and he was awarded the Royal Aeronautical Society silver medal for aeronautics.

== Early life ==
Cyril Uwins was born at 2 Carmichael Road, South Norwood, Croydon, on 2 August 1896, the eldest son of Frank Uwins, a wood broker, and his wife, Annie Henton. He was educated at the Whitgift School, Croydon, where he developed an interest in kites.

== Aviation career ==
On the outbreak of the First World War, Uwins joined the Army and served with the London Irish Rifles. In November 1915 he was promoted to second lieutenant. After active service in France he transferred to the RFC in August 1916 and flew with 13 and 64 Squadrons. In January 1917 he was posted to Farnborough as a ferry pilot, and that summer he formed a flying school at Lake Down Aerodrome on Salisbury Plain. He moved to No 5 Aircraft Acceptance Park, Filton, which started his association with Bristol Aeroplane Company, then officially referred to as the British and Colonial Aeroplane Company, Ltd. Here, he carried out test flights on newly built Bristol Fighters before ferrying them to France. In 1918, during a ferry flight in a Morane-Parasol monoplane from Hounslow aerodrome to St Omer in France, the engine failed and in the ensuing crash Uwins broke his neck. As a result of this injury his head movement was permanently impaired.

Once he was out of hospital Uwins was judged medically unfit for active service, and on 25 October 1918 he was posted to the Bristol Aeroplane Company's works at Filton to succeed Captain Joseph Hammond who had been killed flying an American-built Bristol fighter. Uwins's first test flight as chief test pilot was the next day (26 October 1918), in a Bristol Scout. He had already made his first trial of a new aircraft type on 4 September in the prototype Bristol Scout F1. On 1 May 1919 he was demobilized from the Royal Air Force (Note: While Uwins left the RAF in 1919 he remained in the Reserve of Air Force Officers, being promoted to honorary flight lieutenant in February 1927.) and formally joined the Bristol Aeroplane Company, and the same day made the first post-war civil air flight in Britain when he flew the Bristol Company's general manager, Herbert Thomas, from Filton to Hounslow in a Bristol Tourer. As well as test flying, Uwins flew Bristol aircraft in a number of races and in 1926, flying a Bristol Brownie, he won the second prize at the Lympne light aircraft trials, also winning the Duke of Sutherland's prize for the best take-off and landing. The following year he was one of the first pilots to experience control reversal caused by aeroelasticity while testing the Bristol Bagshot

On 16 September 1932, flying a modified Vickers Vespa fitted with a supercharged Bristol Pegasus engine, he set a new world altitude record, reaching a height of 43,976 ft (13,404 m). He was awarded the Britannia Trophy for this achievement. He was awarded the AFC in 1937 and appointed OBE in 1943.

Uwins' entire career was spent with Bristol, and eventually he had a team of ten test pilots working under him. His nickname, "Papa" Uwins, is an indication of the affection and respect with which he was regarded. He made the first flight of every Bristol type up to the Type 170 Bristol Freighter, and in all made the first flight of 58 prototype aircraft, achieving this without any major accident, although not without several close shaves. He ended his career as Deputy Chairman of the company.

== Family life ==
He died on 11 September 1972 in Bath. At the time he was married to Naomi with a daughter and stepson; another stepson had died before him.
