= Wright XF3W Apache =

1926 prototype racing aircraft model by Wright Aeronautical

XF3W
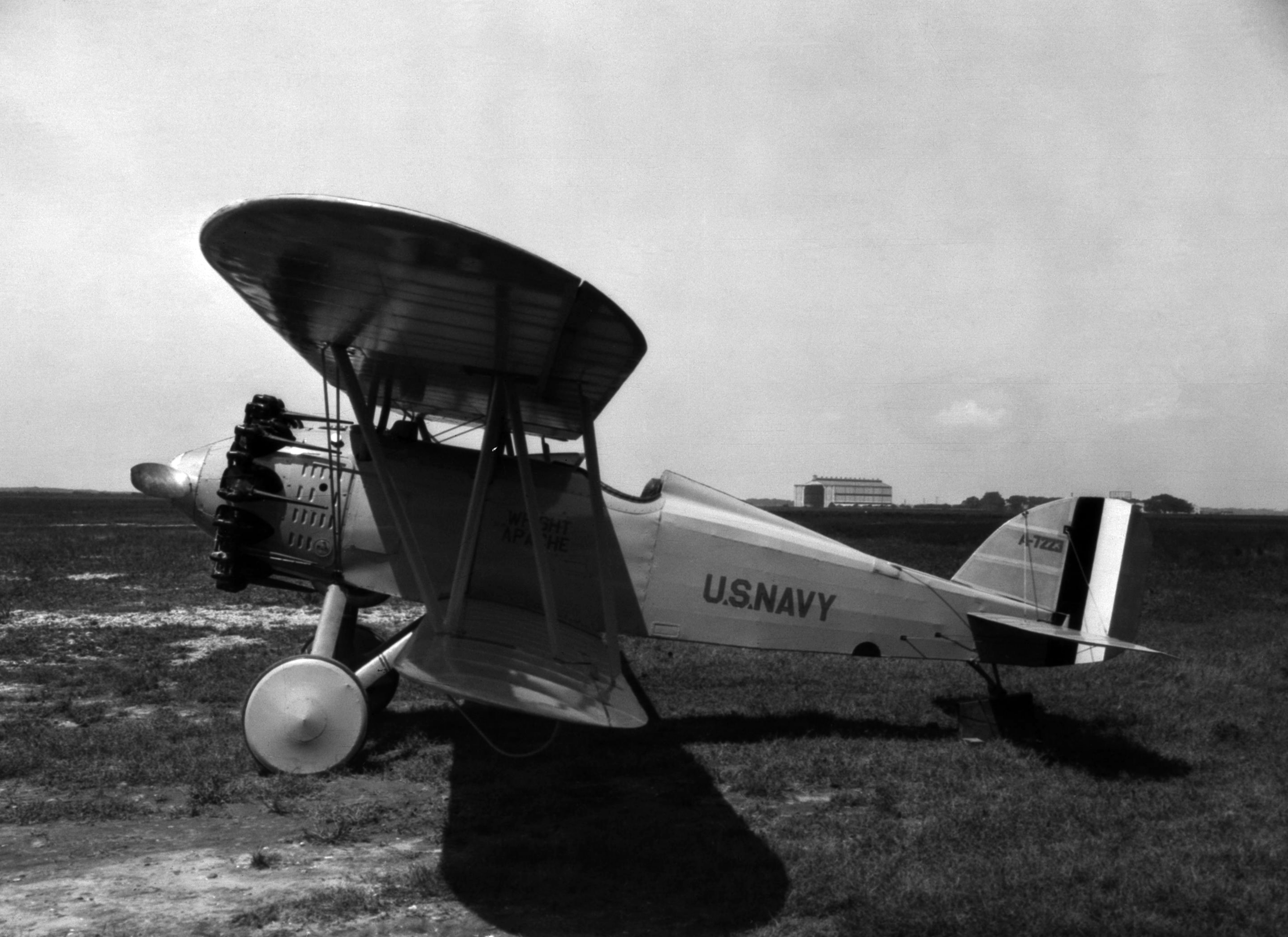
- Wright XF3W Apache

General information
- Type: Racer
- National origin: United States
- Manufacturer: Wright Aeronautical
- Number built: 1

History
- First flight: 5 May 1926

The Wright XF3W was an American racing aircraft built by Wright Aeronautical for the United States Navy.

== Development and design ==
After the U.S. Navy declared its preference for radial engines, Wright developed the P-1 Simoon. To demonstrate the engine, the F3W was designed to carry it. The F3W was a single-seat biplane, with a steel tubing fuselage and wood wings, covered by fabric. Designed to be a carrier-based fighter and powered by the Simoon engine, its performance was poor. After the Navy took delivery of the aircraft, they installed a rival company's engine, the Pratt & Whitney R-1340 radial. The aircraft was redesignated XF3W, and flew with the new engine for the first time on 5 May 1926.

== Operational history ==
The Navy used the XF3W as a test bed for the Pratt & Whitney engine until 1930, during which time the aircraft set a number of records. On 6 September 1929, the XF3W piloted by Apollo Soucek set the world altitude record for seaplanes of 38,500 ft (11,700 m); on 6 April 1930, Soucek set the landplane altitude record of 43,166 ft (13,157 m). The XF3W was also fitted with a single centreline float to evaluate the concept of basing floatplanes on battleships.

== Specifications ==
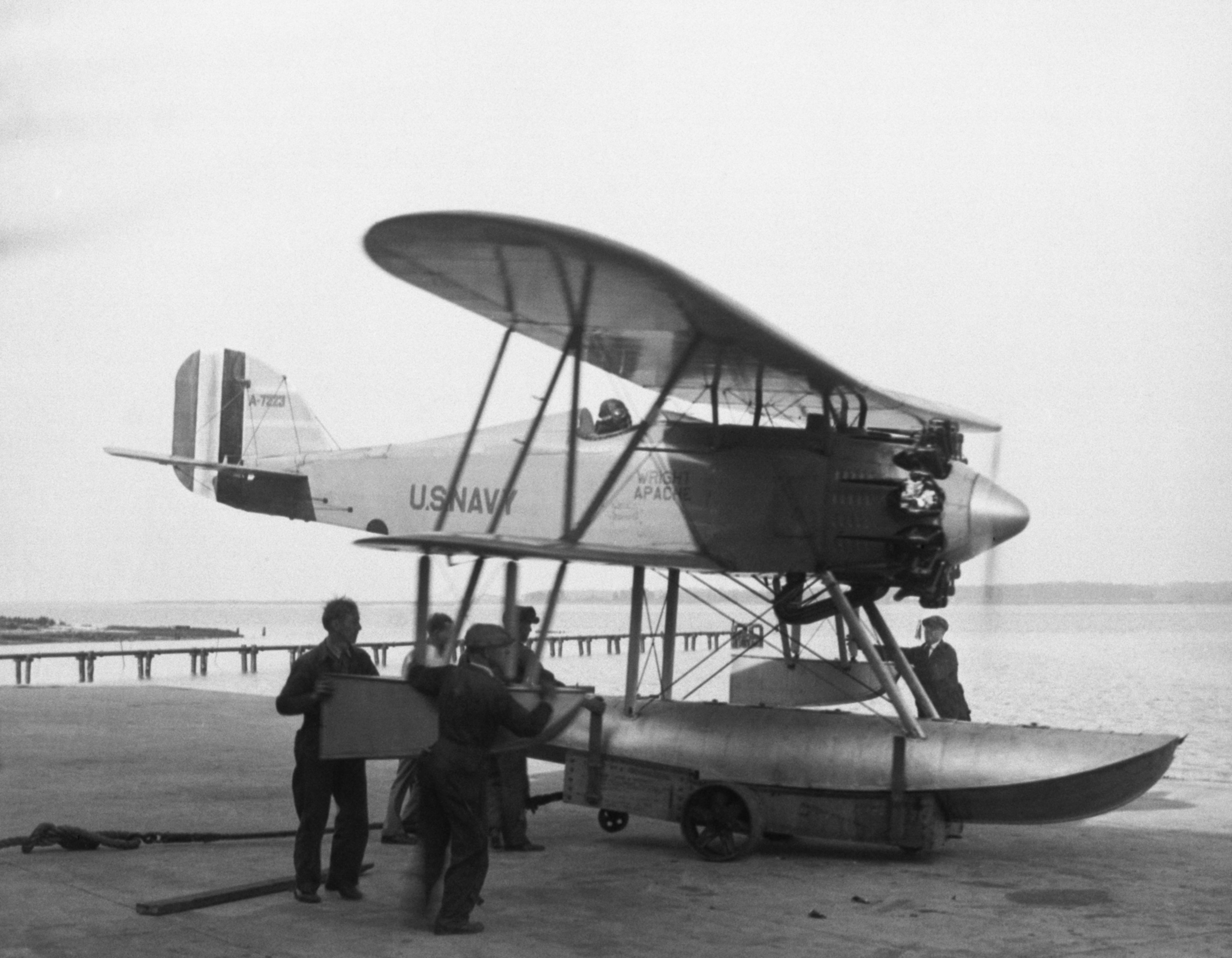
The XF3W-1 with floats.

Data from Angelucci, 1987. p. 462.

General characteristics

- Crew: 1
- Length: 22 ft 1 in (6.73 m)
- Wingspan: 27 ft 4 in (8.33 m)
- Height: 8 ft 6 in (2.59 m)
- Wing area: 215 sq ft (19.97 m^{2})
- Empty weight: 1,414 lb (641 kg)
- Gross weight: 2,128 lb (965 kg)
- Powerplant: 1 × Pratt & Whitney R-1340-B , 450 hp (336 kW)

Performance

- Maximum speed: 162 mph (261 km/h, 141 kn)
- Service ceiling: 38,560 ft (11,753 m)
