= Vickers Vespa =

British army cooperation biplane

Vespa
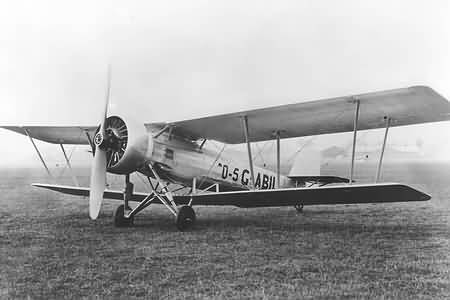
- The Vickers Vespa VII which reached a world altitude record

General information
- Type: Army Cooperation Aircraft
- Manufacturer: Vickers Limited
- Primary users: Bolivia Irish Air Corps
- Number built: 15

History
- Introduction date: 1928
- First flight: 1925
- Retired: 1940

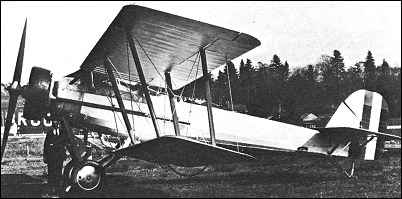

The Vickers Vespa was a British army cooperation biplane designed and built by Vickers Limited in the 1920s. While not adopted by Britain's Royal Air Force, small numbers were bought by the Irish Free State and Bolivia, the latter of which used the type during the Chaco War. One modified Vespa was used to set a world altitude record of 43,976 ft (13,407 m) in September 1932.

== Design and development ==
The Vespa was designed by Vickers as a private venture to meet the requirements of Air Ministry Specification 30/24. The first prototype, the Vespa I, was flown in September 1925. The Vespa, which was a single-engine biplane with a slim fuselage suspended between closely spaced and highly staggered two-bay wooden wings, was delivered for evaluation by the Royal Air Force, but crash landed owing to engine trouble on 24 June 1926 and was badly damaged. It was then rebuilt with steel, fabric-covered wings as the Vespa II, but this was unsuccessful in getting orders from the RAF.

It did, however, attract attention from Bolivia, which ordered six Vespa IIIs, an improved all metal version, in 1928, and the Irish Free State, which ordered four Vespa IVs in 1929 and a further four Vespa Vs in 1930.

The prototype Vespa was modified as the Vespa VI for demonstration to the Central Chinese government, but was not purchased, so was returned to Britain. It was rebuilt as the Vespa VII, with a supercharged Bristol Pegasus S engine for an attempt on the world altitude record, setting a record of 43,976 ft (13,407 m) on 16 September 1932.

== Operational history ==
Six Vespa IIIs were delivered to Bolivia in 1928, where they were mainly used as operational conversion aircraft, although they did see limited use in the Chaco War as reconnaissance and long-range bombers, these aircraft operating at low altitude rather than the high altitude that Bolivia's Vespas were optimised for. They remained in service until 1935.

The eight Irish Vespas remained in service for several years, operating from the Irish Air Corps base at Baldonnel, near Dublin, with the last being written off on 12 June 1940.

== Variants ==
Vickers Type 113 Vespa I
Prototype army cooperation aircraft for evaluation by RAF. Wooden wings. Powered by Bristol Jupiter IV radial engine (later fitted with Jupiter VI. One only (G-EBLD))
Vickers Type 119 Vespa II
Vespa I modified with metal wings.
Vickers Type 149 Vespa III
Improved all-metal production version for Bolivia. Powered by 455 hp (339 kW) Jupiter VI engine. Six built.
Vickers Type 193 Vespa IV
Production version for Irish Air Corps. Powered by 490 hp (370 kW) Armstrong Siddeley Jaguar VIC. Four built.
Vickers Type 208 Vespa V
Improved version of Vespa IV for Irish Air Corps. Fitted with Townend ring around engine. Four built.
Vickers Type 210 Vespa VI
Rebuilt first prototype (ie. Vespa I / Vespa II), re-registered as G-ABIL and demonstrated to Central Chinese government.
Vickers Type 250 Vespa VII
Vespa VI rebuilt with Bristol Pegasus S engine for altitude record attempt.

== Operators ==
Bolivia

- Bolivian Air Force 6 planes. Retired 1935.

Ireland

- Irish Air Corps 8 planes. The last Irish plane retired on 12 June 1940.

United Kingdom

- Royal Air Force 1 plane. Only evaluation use (in mid-1920s) and only one prototype plane used. Not adopted by Royal Air Force ever.

== Specifications (Vespa V) ==
Data from Vickers Aircraft Since 1908

General characteristics

- Crew: 2
- Length: 33 ft 0 in (10.06 m)
- Wingspan: 50 ft 0 in (15.24 m)
- Height: 10 ft 6 in (3.20 m)
- Wing area: 576 sq ft (53.5 m^{2})
- Empty weight: 2,882 lb (1,307 kg)
- Gross weight: 4,370 lb (1,982 kg)
- Powerplant: 1 × Armstrong Siddeley Jaguar VIC 14-cylinder air-cooled radial engine, 490 hp (370 kW)

Performance

- Maximum speed: 139 mph (224 km/h, 121 kn) at 10,000 ft (3,000 m)
- Range: 580 mi (930 km, 500 nmi) at 15,000 ft (4,600 m) and 116 mph (101 kn; 187 km/h)
- Service ceiling: 26,000 ft (7,900 m) (absolute Ceiling)
- Time to altitude: 16 min to 15,000 ft (4,600 m)

Armament

- Guns:
  - 1 × fixed, forward-firing .303 in (7.7 mm) Vickers machine gun
  - 1 × .303 in (7.7 mm) Lewis Gun on Scarff ring in rear cockpit
- Bombs: provision to carry bombs

== See also ==
- Aerial operations in the Chaco War

Related lists

- List of aircraft of the Royal Air Force
