= QinetiQ 1 =

General information
- Type: High altitude manned research balloon
- Flights: 1

History
- Last flight: 2 September 2003 (failed launch)
- Fate: scrapped

QinetiQ 1 was a balloon designed to set a new world altitude record for manned balloon flight of around 40 km (25 miles, 132,000 feet). The balloon was named after the main sponsor, QinetiQ (formerly part of DERA, the British Defence Evaluation and Research Agency).

The immense 381 m high zero-pressure balloon was constructed from 5,000 kg of polyethylene. The lift gas used for the balloon was helium. At the anticipated flight ceiling, the balloon's volume would have been 1.25 million m^{3} (40 million ft^{3}). The two pilots, Andy Elson and Colin Prescot, were to occupy an open deck, relying on Zvezda-manufactured Sokol space suits to keep them alive during the anticipated twelve-hour flight.

The attempt was originally planned for 2002, but adverse high altitude conditions halted attempts in that year. The launch site for the twelve-hour flight was decided to be off the coast of Cornwall.

In 2003 the launch was initially set to take place on 2 September from the deck of RV Triton off the coast of St Ives. Early that morning, it was decided to postpone the launch for 24 hours due to cloud cover at high altitude. The following morning an attempt was made to inflate the balloon. At around 6.55 AM with the balloon inflated to a height of 15 metres, helium began to escape from the envelope. An irreparable tear was discovered along one of the seams of the balloon, and all efforts for a flight in 2003 were abandoned.

== Other record attempts ==
The current balloon flight record was set by Malcolm Ross (USNR) and Victor Prather (USN), who took the Strato-Lab V balloon to 34,668 m (113,740 ft) on 4 May 1961 above the Gulf of Mexico. The balloonists landed successfully, but Victor Prather slipped from the helicopter lift harness while being transferred to a waiting aircraft carrier, and he drowned before US Navy divers could rescue him. Nicholas Piantanida, while attempting to set a new skydiving jump record, is claimed to have reached 123,800 feet (37.73 km) on 2 February 1966. Piantanida was unable to disconnect his breathing apparatus from the gondola, so the ground crew jettisoned the balloon at the flight ceiling. Piantanida's attempt did not set a flight record because he descended without the balloon.
