= Sport Fishing Magazine =

American outdoors magazine

Sport Fishing
- Editor: Doug Olander
- Categories: Sports/fishing
- Frequency: 8 times per year — monthly February to June, and bimonthly July to December
- Total circulation (2018): 83,802
- First issue: January 1986
- Company: Bonnier
- Country: USA
- Based in: Winter Park, Florida
- Language: English
- Website: www.sportfishingmag.com
- ISSN: 0896-7369

Sport Fishing is an outdoors magazine about recreational marine fishing owned by Bonnier Corp. It is a sister magazine of Salt Water Sportsman and Marlin. Sport Fishing was launched in Winter Park, Florida, in February 1986, by World Publications.

Sport Fishing editorial coverage includes new saltwater-fishing techniques and destinations and insight about buying and using fishing tackle and boats. Its editors are outspoken in defense of sound fisheries conservation, sensible management and safeguarding angler access to fishing.
