= Vera Simons =

German-American inventor and artist

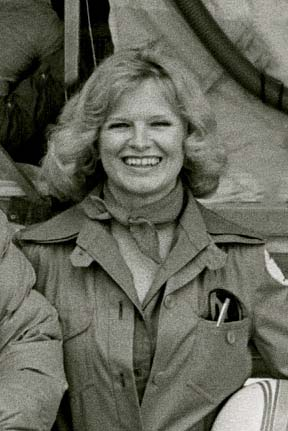
- Simons in 1976
- Born: Wera Maria Habrecht; November 23, 1920; Heidenheim, Germany
- Died: July 31, 2012 (aged 91); Austin, Texas, U.S.
- Other name: Vera Winzen
- Known for: Balloon engineer, cofounder of Winzen Research
- Spouse(s): Clifford Charles La Plante; David G. Simons (divorced, 1969); Otto C. Winzen (divorced, 1958)
- Scientific career
- Fields: Aeronautics

Vera Simons (November 23, 1920 – July 31, 2012) was an inventor, artist, and balloonist. She became known in the 1950s and 1960s as a leader in high altitude gas balloon development and exploration, belonging to a group of pioneers known as the "Pre-Astronauts."

== Career ==
In 1949, Simons co-founded one of the world's first plastic balloon companies called Winzen Research, Inc. with her then-husband Otto C. Winzen. To launch the company, she borrowed money from her parents and held two-thirds ownership in the endeavor. She became vice president and provided the needed management skills to launch the company and ensure its success. She worked at Winzen Research for a decade, during which time she secured four patents for her work improving construction techniques and envelope redesign. She also developed new systems that would ensure consistent quality across the Winzen line of products.

At Winzen Research, Simons trained a number of women—who were known as the "balloon girls"—to handle polyethylene and build giant balloons. Whenever a balloon was launched, Simons made sure that the team of women who worked on the balloon could watch. In an interview with Craig Ryan, Simons noted: "To see what you've made come alive, that's pretty damned exciting."

Simons and her balloon girls worked on a number of high-profile balloon projects for the United States government. Their high-flying balloons were used to transport scientific equipment to high altitudes. During the 1950s and 1960s, Winzen Research was hired to engineer balloons capable of carrying humans for the United States Navy projects Helios, Skyhook, and Strato-Lab; for the United States Air Force, they worked on Project Manhigh. Manhigh took advantage of Simons's thin polyethylene balloons, which were notably more flexible than the cloth balloons that predated them, allowing pilots to more effectively control their elevation. The Manhigh missions enabled the Air Force to understand the effects of high-altitude flights on humans. Simons became a central figure in the planning and execution of those research flights.

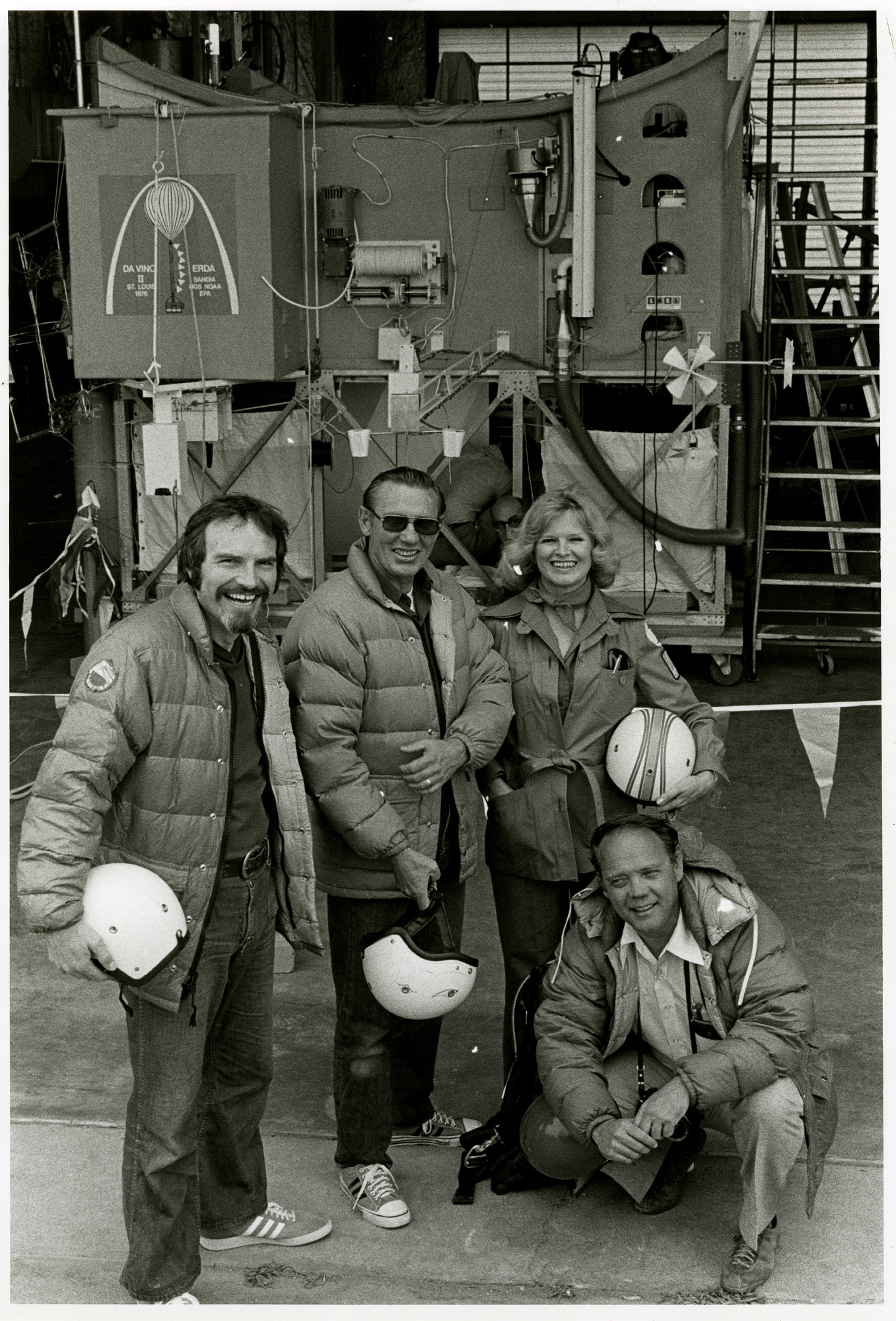
Da Vinci II" crew posed in front of the balloon's gondola prior to lift off, Arrowhead Airport, near St. Louis, Missouri, June 8, 1976. From left to right are Rudolph J. Engelmann (National Oceanic and Atmospheric Administration); Jimmie Craig (U.S. Naval Weapons Center); Vera Simons; and Otis Imboden (National Geographic photographer).

Simons earned her gas-balloon pilot's license in 1957 and became an accomplished balloonist. In 1957, she represented the United States in Holland at the 30th Annual International Gas Balloon Races, where she received a gold medal recognizing her contributions to gas balloon research.

In 1958, Simons divorced Otto C. Winzen, and subsequently sold her interest in Winzen Research. Prior to meeting Winzen, she had studied art formally at the Walker Art Center and the Minneapolis School of Art, so after the divorce she returned to the world of art, enrolling in the Corcoran Art School in Washington, D.C., and in 1960, she moved to Texas, launching her career as an artist.

By the 1960s, Simons became internationally recognized as an artist, showing her work in San Antonio, Houston, Mexico City, San Francisco, and New York, and later showed her work in Brazil, Venezuela, and Australia. Several of her pieces drew from her expertise as a balloonist and engineer. In 1971, she exhibited her work at the Stedelijk Museum in Amsterdam, Holland, and the museum commissioned her to fly a gas balloon launched from the museum's grounds, a project she called "Drift Amsterdam". Later that year, she showed a project called "Sky Structure" at Milwaukee's Lake Front Festival of the Arts. The project consisted of 150 5-foot tetrahedrons linked together and filled with helium that flew above the festival.

In the 1970s, she conceived of the project "Da Vinci," a series of four manned helium balloon flights that would bridge her love of art and ballooning. The endeavor was sponsored by the Environmental Protection Agency, the National Oceanic and Atmospheric Administration (NOAA), General Electric, NASA, and the National Geographic. She collaborated with meteorologist and NOAA researcher Rudolf J. Englemann to perform in-flight experiments on atmospheric pollution. Over the course of two years, Simons designed and supervised the construction of a polyethylene balloon and a double-decker fiberglass gondola lift. The first flight launched in 1974 over New Mexico and the second and third launched over St. Louis in June and July 1976. The final flight, which launched on September 26, 1979, over Tillamook, Oregon, was called the "Da Vinci Transamerica." The flight set a Comité International d’Aérostation (or FAI Ballooning Commission) world record for the Longest Flight for a Female Pilot when it landed near Lima, Ohio, on October 1, 1979, after flying for 133 hours and 45 minutes. During the flight, Simons dropped small balloons, which carried Douglas fir seedlings, into cleared areas. She also took time-lapse photos, made sound recordings, and used mirrors to create lighting effects for spectators watching her journey from the ground.

1984 marked her final project in ballooning and the arts, with the flight "Project Aerolus." Three interlinked balloons, which were lit from within, were launched into the night sky over New Mexico. Each balloon was piloted by a famous balloonist: Joe Kittinger, Ben Abruzzo (co-piloted by Simons), and Larry Newman.

Her image is included in the iconic 1972 poster Some Living American Women Artists by Mary Beth Edelson.

== Personal life ==
Simons was born on November 23, 1920, in Heidenheim, Germany, to parents Max and Maja Habrecht. Her family emigrated to the United States in 1923, where she was raised in Detroit, Michigan. There, she attended Cass Technical High School, graduating in 1939. She met her first husband, Otto C. Winzen, who was studying aeronautical engineering at the University of Detroit; the aeronaut Jean Piccard introduced the couple. They were married on February 1, 1941, in Detroit. The couple later divorced in 1958 and, two years later, Simons remarried a physician-turned-balloonist David G. Simons, with whom she worked on Project Manhigh. The couple later divorced on May 5, 1969. On May 26, 1975, she married Clifford Charles La Plante in Arlington, Virginia. Simons died on July 31, 2012, in Austin, Texas, where she had lived for 22 years.
