= Winzen =

Winzen is a German surname. Notable people with the surname include:

- Carola Doerr (née Winzen, born 1984), German computer scientist
- Otto C. Winzen (1917–1979), German-American aeronautics engineer, married to Vera
- Tracey Winzen (born 1981), American football player
- Vera Winzen (1920–2012), German-American inventor, artist, and balloonist, married to Otto
