= Malcolm Ross (balloonist) =

20th-century U.S. Navy Reserve captain, atmospheric scientist, and balloonist

Malcolm David Ross
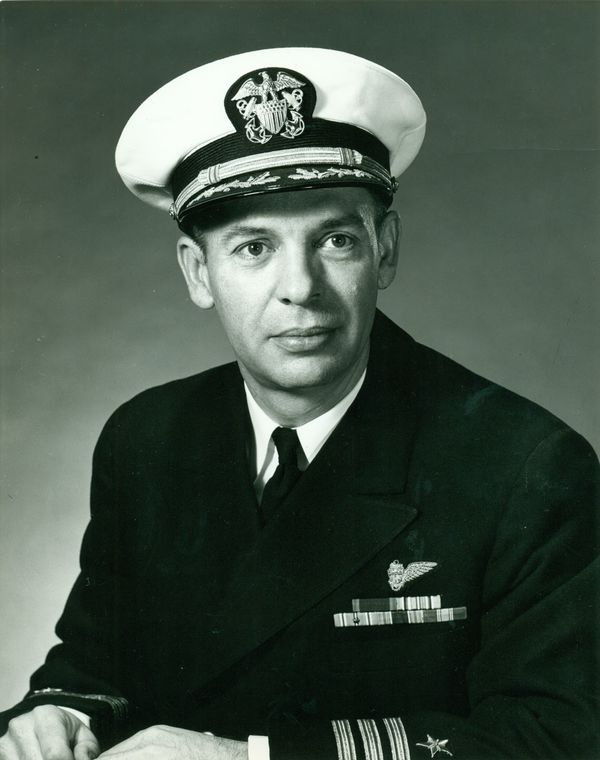
- Malcolm Ross
- Born: October 15, 1919; Momence, Illinois, U.S.
- Died: October 8, 1985 (aged 65); Birmingham, Michigan, U.S.
- Resting place: Arlington National Cemetery
- Education: 1941 BS in physics (Purdue), 1944 postgraduate certificate in meteorology (Univ of Chicago)
- Occupation: Atmospheric Physicist
- Employer: Office of Naval Research, Washington, D.C.
- Known for: Scientific and record-breaking manned balloon flights
- Title: Captain (USNR)
- Spouse: Marjorie Martin

Malcolm David Ross (October 15, 1919 – October 8, 1985) was a captain in the United States Naval Reserve (USNR), an atmospheric scientist, and a balloonist who set several records for altitude and scientific inquiry, with more than 100 hours flight time in gas balloons by 1961. Along with Lieutenant Commander Victor A. Prather (USN), he set the altitude record for a manned balloon flight. (Note: The 1961 flight is still current for the FAI General Altitude (#1032, AA-15 Gas balloons: 22,000 m³ and above) and Absolute Altitude (#2325) records for balloon flight. The flight ceiling was broken by the parachutists Nick Piantanida in 1966, Felix Baumgartner in 2012, and Alan Eustace in 2014, but the FAI balloon flight records still stand as none of the parachutists descended with the balloon.) (Note: Nicholas Piantanida, while attempting to set a new skydiving jump record, is claimed to have reached 123,800 feet (37.73 km) on February 2, 1966. Piantanida was unable to disconnect his breathing apparatus from the gondola, so the ground crew jettisoned the balloon at the flight ceiling. The 1966 ascent did not set a flight record because the gondola descended without the balloon.)

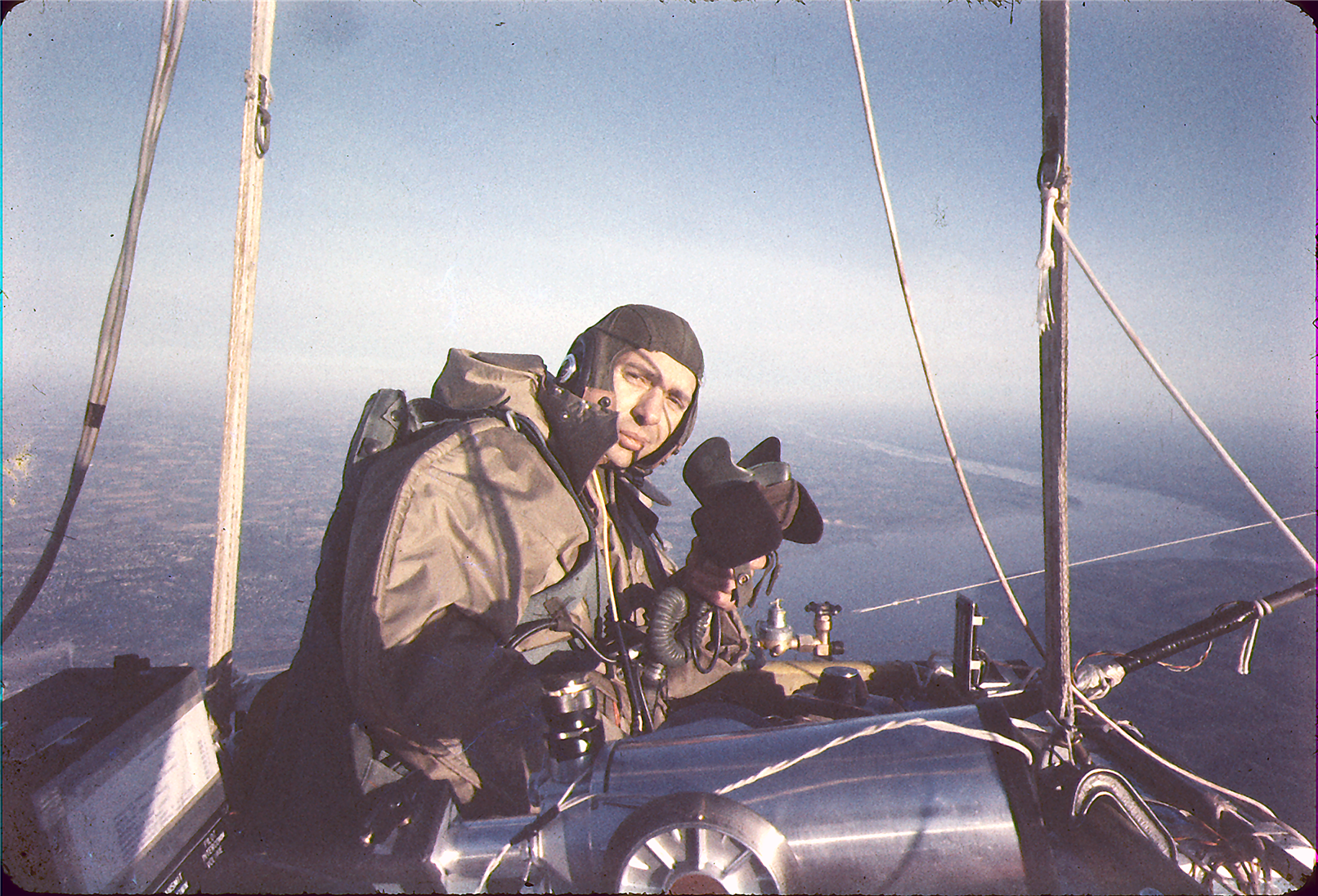
Malcolm Ross, 10,000 feet (3,000 m) above the Mississippi River in 1958

== Life ==
Ross was born on October 15, 1919, in Momence, Illinois, the son of Mr. and Mrs. J. R. Ross of 1825 Garden Street, West Lafayette, Indiana. He spent most of his early life in West Lafayette. About 1932, his family moved to a farm in Linden, Montgomery Country, Indiana. He attended all four years in Linden High School and graduated in 1936. Malcolm Ross received a scholarship to attend Purdue University to study civil engineering. While at Purdue, he worked at the campus radio station as a sports announcer and changed his major to creative writing, communication, and radio. However, Malcolm Ross graduated from Purdue in June 1941 with a BS in physics. After college, he married his high school sweetheart, Marjorie Martin(December 12, 1918-March 20, 2023) and took broadcasting jobs in Anderson, Chicago, and Indianapolis.

In January 1943, Ross was commissioned as an ensign in the United States Naval Reserve. After he completed two months training at the Quonset Point Naval Air Station in Rhode Island, the Navy sent him to graduate school for nine months training in physics and general meteorology at the University of Chicago. In June 1944, he completed the training with a professional certificate in meteorology and atmospheric science.

The Navy initially assigned Ross to the Fleet Weather Center at Pearl Harbor. Later he served as the aerology officer aboard the USS Saratoga while it was flying missions against Tokyo and Iwo Jima in the Pacific Ocean theater of World War II, from 1944 to 1945. Ross received a campaign star in his Pacific Theater Ribbon for the first carrier plane strike at Tokyo in February 1945 and for the Iwo Jima invasion.

After World War II ended, Ross was released from the military. He returned to civilian life and opened an advertising agency in Pasadena, California, where his wife, Marjorie, had moved during World War II. Marjorie worked in the agency as the office manager. The business continued successfully until June 1950, when Ross was recalled to active duty for the Korean War as a lieutenant in the United States Naval Reserve. Initially, Malcolm Ross was stationed as an instructor in radiological defense for the Naval Damage Control Training Center at Treasure Island, in San Francisco. From there he was able to commute home during weekends to spend time with his family and maintain the advertising business. This came to an end when in 1951 the Navy reassigned Ross to work as the liaison officer for the Office of Naval Research in Minneapolis.

The Navy's unmanned balloon program, Project Skyhook, was based in Minneapolis, which was also a center of balloon research and development being carried out by the University of Minnesota and General Mills. In 1953, Ross was transferred to the air branch of the Office of Naval Research (ONR) in Washington, D.C., as balloon projects director. In this position, he began to direct high-altitude balloon projects to obtain cosmic ray and meteorological data with the Project Skyhook program, working with Ruby Ward as the contracts negotiator of the ONR. Ross was technical director for Project Churchy, (Note: During the late summer of 1953 the Navy conducted cosmic ray experiments in Project Mushrat in the vicinity of Frobisher Bay, above Labrador. In September 1953 it engaged in Project Churchy near the Equator in the vicinity of the Galapagos Islands.) (Note: Walt Kelly gave permission to use the name of one of the principal characters of his comic strip Pogo, in reference to the turtles on the Galapagos Islands.) an expedition to the Galápagos Islands to obtain cosmic ray and meteorological data from balloon flights. He arranged for balloon launchings at Goodfellow Air Force Base in 1954 and 1955. He was a member of the scientific group that launched balloons for the ONR at Saskatoon, Saskatchewan, Canada, and photographed the 1954 eclipse of the sun from a Skyhook balloon over Minneapolis.

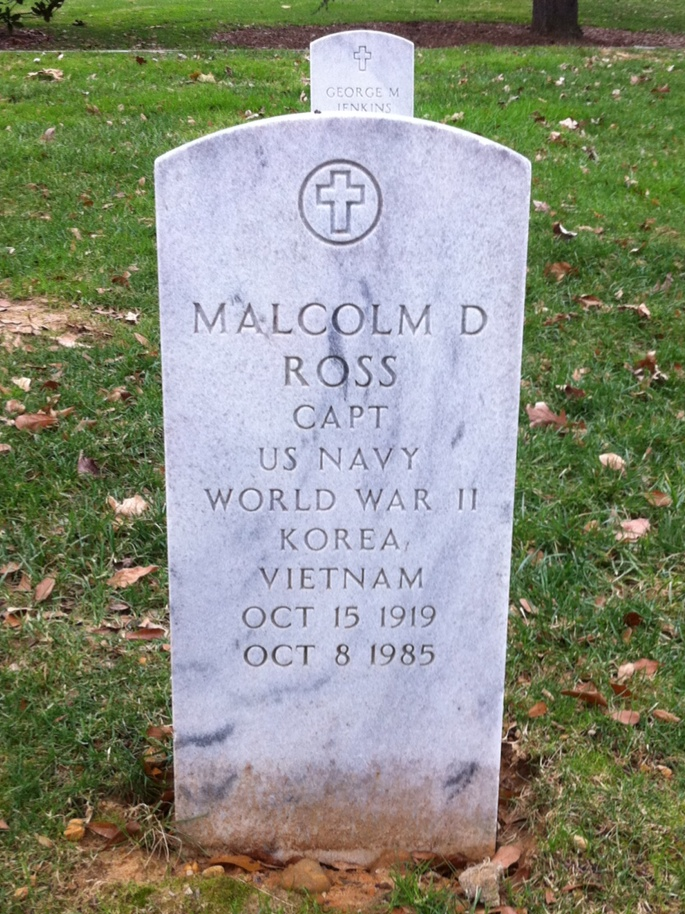
Grave at Arlington National Cemetery

During his tour as ONR's Balloon Projects Officer, Ross initiated the Navy's manned balloon program, Project Strato-Lab, in 1954. The Strato-Lab program utilized the new plastic high-altitude balloons for upper atmosphere research. At this time, Ross became the first active duty military officer qualified and licensed as a free balloon pilot based solely on plastic balloon experience. Ross went on inactive duty in 1955 as a Lieutenant Commander (USNR). As a physicist in the Air Branch of the ONR, Ross specialized in the physics of the upper atmosphere and participated in Strato-Lab flights both as a civilian and as a naval officer. As the key participant in Project Strato-Lab, he spent more than 100 hours with scientists and other balloonists making observations in the stratosphere. At the time of the record-setting flight in 1961, Malcolm Ross was a Commander in the Naval Reserve.

In 1957, Ross received the Navy League's newly established Rear Admiral William S. Parsons Award for Scientific and Technical Progress, and the Navy Meritorious Civilian Service Award. In 1958, jointly with Lieutenant Commander Morton Lee Lewis, he received the Harmon International Trophy (Aeronaut) for the November 8, 1956, record-breaking flight. In 1962, jointly with Victor Prather, he received the Harmon Trophy again for the record-holding flight in 1961 to 21.5 miles (34.6 km). Ross never flew in balloons again after the 1961 flight, although he continued to advocate using balloons as relatively inexpensive platforms for scientific investigations.

Ross retired from the US Naval Reserve as a captain on July 1, 1973. After leaving the Office of Naval Research, Malcolm Ross worked in space research at General Motors. Later on he became a stock brokerage executive for Merrill Lynch Pierce Fenner and Smith, Inc. and served as assistant vice president and account executive at the Bloomfield Hills branch.

Ross died at home in Birmingham, Michigan, and is buried with his wife Marjorie at Arlington National Cemetery.

== Balloon flights ==
The following table describes Malcolm Ross's balloon flights.

Date	Altitude	Comments
August 10, 1956	40,000 feet (12,000 m)	With Lieutenant Commander M. L. Lewis (United States Navy), made the first stratospheric manned flight on an Office of Naval Research Strato-Lab polyethylene balloon. The purpose of this flight was to study airplane vapor trails.
November 8, 1956	76,000 feet (23,000 m)	With Lieutenant Commander M. L. Lewis (USN), established a world altitude record in the plastic ONR 56,634-cubic-metre (2,000,000 cu ft) Strato-Lab High I balloon, breaking the 21-year-old record set by Explorer II. They took off at 6:19 AM from South Dakota's Stratobowl, a natural depression shielded by 500-foot (150 m) hills near Rapid City. They landed four hours and four minutes later, after drifting 175 miles (282 km), 18 miles (29 km) southwest of Kennedy, Nebraska, 7 miles Northwest of Brownlee. The flight broke the previous altitude record of 72,394 feet (22,066 m) set in 1935 by O.A. Anderson and A.W. Stevens, who also took off from the Stratobowl. The flight was punctuated by a 14 and 1/3-mile plunge from their flight ceiling after an automatic valve malfunctioned and released gas from the balloon. They were able to slow their descent and make a safe landing by dumping all 300 pounds of ballast along with 200 pounds of equipment. The purpose of the flight was to gather meteorological, cosmic ray, and other scientific data necessary to improve safety at high altitudes. This was the first time that the sky overhead was seen as black. It also demonstrated the feasibility of man-carrying stratospheric balloon flights using light and relatively inexpensive polyethylene plastic balloons. The Strato-Lab I balloon was 128 feet (39 m) in diameter and, including valves, weighed 595 pounds (270 kg). The previous 1935 record-breaking flight used a rubberized-cotton envelope that was 192 feet (59 m) in diameter and weighed 5,916 pounds (2,683 kg). For this record ascent, the balloonists were awarded the 1956 Harmon Trophy for Aeronauts.
June 27, 1957		With atmospheric physicist Charles B. Moore, successfully ascended in a Strato-Lab balloon from the top of Mount Withington, near Socorro, New Mexico, into a cumulus cloud to investigate the interior of a thunderstorm. The flight was the first of a series conducted during the summer under the sponsorship of the Office of Naval Research and the Bureau of Aeronautics.
October 18, 1957	85,700 feet (26,100 m)	With Lieutenant Commander M. L. Lewis (USN), made a 10-hour flight into the stratosphere. The balloonists carried equipment to photograph Sputnik, but were unable to make visual contact with the Soviet space satellite. The Air Force program, Project Manhigh, had by this time reached 101,516 feet (30,942 m) feet, but Ross and Lewis ascended to an unofficial two-man altitude record of 85,700 feet (26,100 m) feet in a Strato-Lab High II balloon. The flight lasted 10 hours.
May 6, 1958 – May 7, 1958	40,000 feet (12,000 m)	With Alfred H. Mikesell (United States Naval Observatory), ascended in an open gondola under a 72-foot-diameter (22 m) polyethylene balloon at 8:01 PM CDT from the Mangnan-Joann open pit mine, near Ironton, Minnesota. The balloon reached nearly 40,000 feet (12,000 m) 30 minutes later and remained at that altitude until starting to descend at 10:20 PM to 10,000 to 15,000 feet (3000–4600 m) for the remainder of the night. The balloon drifted 325 miles (523 km) in 11 hours and 25 minutes before landing at 7:26 AM on an alfalfa field 8 miles (13 km) east-southeast of Dubuque, Iowa. Alfred Mikesell was the first astronomer to make telescopic observations from the stratosphere. It was also the first flight in which a crew remained in the stratosphere in an open gondola after sunset. The purpose of the flight was to discover where the atmosphere created scintillation (twinkling) of starlight. The parameters of the flight were defined by the expectation that the scintillation was introduced at the tropopause. This defined the height and season of the flight, because the height of the tropopause changes seasonally. The flight was therefore designed to go to 40,000 feet (12,000 m) — the necessary data might not have been available any lower, but any higher was deemed too risky. The findings of this flight are incorporated in modern telescope design. A subsequent flight in this project was scheduled to lift Arthur Hoag (USNO) and Malcolm Ross to the stratosphere. The flight was cancelled after LCDR M. Lee Lewis was killed during preflight experiments by a falling pulley-block when a knot in the nylon rope suspending the gondola came loose. John Hall (Note: John Scoville Hall (1908-1991) in 1958 was in the last year of his tenure as the director of the Equatorial Division (soon after renamed Astronomy and Astrophysics) of the U.S. Naval Observatory. That year Hall left the Naval Observatory to become director of the Lowell Observatory for 19 years.) halted stratospheric balloon flights carrying astronomers from the Equatorial Division of the Naval Observatory, saying to Arthur Hoag, "That was so much monkeyshine. I don't want to see you get involved in that. It's too dangerous."
July 26, 1958 – July 27, 1958	82,000 feet (25,000 m)	With Lieutenant Commander M. L. Lewis (USN), lifted in the Strato-Lab High III gondola at 4:41 AM from the Hanna Iron Mine, near Crosby, Minnesota. The flight set a new unofficial record for stratospheric flight of 34 hours 20 minutes. The balloon carried a record load of 5,500 pounds (2,500 kg). The primary purpose of the flight was to test and evaluate the sealed cabin system, which was designed to carry an externally mounted telescope for observation of the atmosphere of Venus. It therefore served as an operational and logistic rehearsal for future flights. The balloon stabilized at an initial ceiling of 79,500 feet (24,200 m) at 7:40 AM. Ross and Lewis remained in the stratosphere near that altitude throughout the day, although by 10:00 PM they descended to 68,500 feet (20,900 m) while dropping 350 pounds (160 kg) of batteries. By 10:30 PM, they were able to stabilize at 70,000 feet (21,000 m) after dropping another 98 pounds (44 kg) of ballast. At 9:00 AM the following morning, on July 27, the balloon reached its peak altitude of 82,000 feet (25,000 m). The balloonists began their final descent at 10:25 AM. The balloon touched down near Jamestown, North Dakota. Due to electrical failures in the ballast control system, they were unable to release additional ballast and impacted somewhat harder than they wished, perhaps 300 to 400 feet (90 to 120 m) per minute. The twin cutoff switches then failed to release the balloon and they ascended again to 4,000–5,000 feet (1,200–1,500 m). By 3:21 PM, they were able to solve the problem and descended to bounce again before the cutoff switch finally released the balloon. During the flight, Ross and Lewis made the first television broadcast from a balloon in the stratosphere. After daybreak on the first day, the balloonists turned on their Dage transitorized television camera (Note: Based on correspondence with Brian Summers of the Museum of the Broadcast Television Camera, probably a version of the 333 or 334 Dage camera.) in a rack pointed downward through one of the down ports. The television pictures were transmitted to ground and airborne receivers. Later in the morning, Lewis removed the camera from the rack and pointed it at Ross while he was discussing (with a member of the support team flying below in a Navy R5D) repairs that they made using masking tape to fix a pressure leak on one of the two escape hatches. At 1:00 PM, they went on the air to broadcast live for 15 minutes over KSTP-TV in Minneapolis, and possibly other stations on the NBC network. Malcolm Ross described it as "...probably one of the strangest programs that a television audience had ever seen...."
August 7, 1959	38,000 feet (12,000 m)	With Robert Cooper (HAO), in an open gondola to make the first observations from a balloon of the Sun's corona with a coronagraph. The balloonists also attempted to measure how sky brightness varied with altitude.
November 28–29, 1959	81,000 feet (25,000 m)	Took Charles B. Moore to perform spectrographic analysis of the planet Venus with minimal interference from Earth's atmosphere. The balloonists were lifted by the 2 million cubic feet (57,000 m^{3}) Strato-Lab IV balloon from South Dakota's Stratobowl. The flight lasted 28 hours and 15 minutes. Ross and Moore used a 16-inch telescope and spectrograph to observe water vapor in the atmosphere of the planet Venus, and demonstrated for the first time that an observatory can be taken off the ground.
May 4, 1961	113,740 feet (34.67 km)	With Lieutenant Commander Victor A. Prather (United States Navy), he successfully piloted the Strato-Lab V balloon into the stratosphere, setting an altitude record of 113,740 feet (34.67 km). Ross and Prather were wearing the Navy's Mark IV full-pressure suit in a gondola that was protected by venetian blinds, but otherwise open to space. At 10 million cubic feet (280,000 m^{3}), the balloon envelope was the largest ever launched, expanding to 300 feet (91 m) in diameter when fully inflated. The primary objective of the flight was to test the Navy Mark IV full-pressure suit. The suit was manufactured by B. F. Goodrich of neoprene, and weighed only 22 pounds (9.98 kg). The Mark IV suit overcame problems of weight, bulk, ventilation, air and water tightness, mobility, temperature control, and survival capabilities so well that NASA selected a modified version for use by the Project Mercury astronauts. The May 4 flight was the most severe test of the suit that was ever conducted. The flight lasted 9 hours 54 minutes and covered a horizontal distance of 140 miles (230 km). As of 2015, the 1961 balloon flight absolute altitude record for balloonists returning to Earth with the balloon has not been broken. The flight was successful, but Victor Prather drowned during the helicopter transfer after landing. For this record ascent, President John F. Kennedy presented the balloonists (Victor Prather, posthumously to his wife) the 1961 Harmon Trophy for Aeronauts.

== Awards and accolades ==
- In 1956 along with Morton L. Lewis awarded the Harmon Trophy for Aeronauts.
- In 1957 awarded the first Rear Admiral William S. Parsons Award for Scientific and Technical Progress presented by the Navy League of the United States.
- In 1957 awarded the Navy Meritorious Civilian Service Award.
- In 1958 awarded the Distinguished Flying Cross, "...for extraordinary achievement while participating in aerial flight as Command Pilot of a two-man Navy balloon and gondola during a daring and hazardous ascent into the upper stratosphere on 26–27 July 1958."
- In 1960 received a Special Award from the American Meteorological Society along with Charles B. Moore and, posthumously, Lee Lewis, "for their recent and significant work in making important aerophysical observations from high-altitude balloons."
- In 1961 awarded the Gold Star in lieu of a 2nd Distinguished Flying Cross, "...for heroism and extraordinary achievement while participating in a balloon flight on 4 May 1961."
- In 1961, awarded the Harmon Trophy for Aeronauts with Lt. Cdr. Victor E. Prather (posthumously), presented by President John F. Kennedy at the White House.

Awards and achievements
Preceded by (United States) Lt. Cdr. Charles A. Mills	Harmon Trophy for Aeronauts; 1956	Succeeded by (United States) Cdr. Jack R. Hunt
Preceded by (First Recipient)	Rear Admiral William S. Parsons Award for Scientific and Technical Progress; 1957	Succeeded by (United States) RDML William Raborn
Preceded by (United States) Capt. Joseph Kittinger	Harmon Trophy for Aeronauts; 1961	Succeeded by Mrs. Nini Boesman, Netherlands (subsequently canceled)

== See also ==
- Charles B. Moore
- Felix Baumgartner
- Flight altitude record
- Manned balloon altitude records
- Project Manhigh
- Project Skyhook
- Project Strato-Lab
- Victor A. Prather
- Winzen Research

== Bibliography ==
- Beischer, Dietrich E.; Fregly, Alfred R. (1962). Animals and Man in Space. A Chronology and Annotated Bibliography through the Year 1960. Defense Technical Information Center (Report). Washington, DC: Office of Naval Research, Department of the Navy. ONR Report ACR64 - AD272581. Archived from the original (pdf) on March 3, 2016.
- Brady, Tim (2001). The American Aviation Experience: A History. Carbondale, Illinois: Southern Illinois University Press. pp. 318–319. ISBN 0-8093-2325-7.
- Childs, Captain Donald R. (22 April 1960). "High Altitude Balloon Research and Development Programs". United States Navy Medical Newsletter. 35 (8). U.S. Navy. Bureau of Medicine and Surgery: 28–35.
- Kennedy, Gregory P. (2007). Touching Space: The Story of Project Manhigh. Atglen, Pennsylvania: A Schiffer Military History Book, Schiffer Books. ISBN 978-0-7643-2788-9.
- Kennedy, Gregory (2018-02-25). "Stratolab, an Evolutionary Stratospheric Balloon Project". Stratocat. Luis E. Pacheco.
- Herman, Jan (1995). Stratolab: The Navy's High-Altitude Balloon Research. Internet Archive (Report).
- Norberg, John (2003). Wings of Their Dreams: Purdue in Flight. West Lafayette, Indiana: Purdue University Press. pp. 287–302. ISBN 1-55753-362-8.
- Ross, Malcolm; Lewis, M. Lee (February 1957). "To 76,000 Feet by Strato-Lab Balloon". National Geographic Magazine. 111 (2). Washington, D.C.: The National Geographic Society: 269–282.
- Ross, Malcolm (January 31, 1958). Plastic Balloons for Planetary Research. Fourth Annual Meeting of the American Astronautical Society, New York, NY. Proceedings of the Fourth Annual Meeting of the AAS. Advances in astronautical sciences. Vol. 2. New York: Distributed by Plenum Press.
- Ross, Malcolm; Lewis, M. Lee (1958). "The Role of Manned Balloons in the Exploration of Space". Institute of Aeronautical Sciences. Reprint #834.
- Ross, Malcolm; Lewis, M. Lee (June 1958). "The Strato-Lab Balloon System for High Altitude Research". The Journal of Aviation Medicine. 29 (5): 375–385. PMID 13538912.
- Ross, Malcolm (May 1959). "Reactions of a Balloon Crew in a Controlled Environment". The Journal of Aviation Medicine. 30 (3). Aerospace Medical Association: 326–333. PMID 13654207.
- Ross, Malcolm; Edwards, Walter (November 1961). "Project Strato-Lab High 5: We Saw the World from the Edge of Space". National Geographic Magazine. 120 (5). Washington, D.C.: The National Geographic Society: 671–685.
- Ross, Malcolm (May 8–10, 1962). A Consideration of the U.S. Navy Strato-Lab Balloon Program and Its Contributions to Manned Space Flight. Second National Conference on the Peaceful Uses of Space, Seattle, WA. Proceedings of the Second National Conference on the Peaceful Uses of Space. Washington, D.C.: NASA. p. 261. SP-8.
- Ryan, Craig (1995). The Pre-Astronauts: Manned Ballooning on the Threshold of Space. Annapolis: US Naval Institute Press. ISBN 1-55750-732-5.
- Shayler, David J. (2000). Disasters and Accidents in Manned Space Flight. Berlin: Springer. ISBN 1-85233-225-5.
- Wilson, Jodie Steelman; Winfrey, Emily Griffin; McDole, Rebecca (2012). "The Highest Achiever of Linden High School". Hidden History of Montgomery County, Indiana. Stroud, Gloucestershire, UK: The History Press. pp. 8–16. ISBN 978-1609495220.

== Malcolm Ross Papers ==
- Malcolm D. Ross Papers including photographs, notes, correspondence, and medical records, are archived at the Smithsonian Institution, NASM Archives Accession No. 1998-0048. National Air and Space Museum. Archives Division MRC 322, Washington, D.C.

== Records ==
Records
Preceded by Captain O. A. Anderson and Captain A. W. Stevens	Highest Balloon Ascent (23.165 km (76,000 ft)); November 8, 1956 – June 2, 1957	Succeeded by Captain Joseph W. Kittinger
Preceded by David Simons	Highest Absolute Altitude for Balloon Flight (34.668 km (113,740 ft)); May 4, 1961 – present	Succeeded by current record
