= Center console =

Center console or centre console may refer to:

- Center console (automobile)
- Center console (boat)
