= Conceive (magazine) =

Magazine focused on women's health and fertility

Conceive Magazine
- conceive magazine Volume 4 Issue 1, Spring 2007
- Editorial Director: Beth Weinhouse
- Categories: Women's health
- Frequency: Quarterly
- Founder: Kim Hahn
- Founded: 2004
- Final issue: 2013
- Company: Bonnier Corporation
- Country: United States
- Based in: Orlando, Florida
- Language: English
- ISSN: 1550-8900

Conceive Magazine was a health and lifestyle publication that provided information about women's health and fertility, about various methods of conception (natural, alternative, assisted and high-tech), and about adoption. The magazine had its headquarters in Orlando, Florida. It was in circulation between 2004 and 2013.

== History and profile ==
Conceive was founded by Kim Hahn and offers information and support to women interested in starting or expanding their families. The content also includes articles on nutrition, exercise, emotional wellbeing, sex, and relationship issues. The magazine also covers early (first trimester) pregnancy.

In addition to the magazine, the Conceive brand included a website (www.conceiveonline.com), e-newsletters, and three books (The Fertility Journal, Fertility Facts, and Cooking to Conceive, all published by Chronicle Books).

In October 2009 Conceive was acquired by the Bonnier Corporation, the U.S. branch of a large Swedish media company, with over 50 titles in the United States. Conceive joined Bonnier's Parenting Group, which included the magazines Parenting, Babytalk, and Working Mother. In May 2013 the magazine was sold to Meredith Corp., and following the change in ownership it ceased publication.
