= T-top (boat) =

A T-top is a type of top for center console boats that is built with a T-shaped structure when viewed from the side. The top is tall enough to stand under, and provides shade and rain protection for two or more passengers at the boat's helm. The T-top is distinguished from other boat tops in that the entire structure is attached to the center console area, with no support brackets or straps connected to the outside of the boat, thereby providing 360-degree access around the boat for fishing and water activities.

Generally, T-tops are constructed from a high-quality marine aluminum extrusion which is anodized for appearance longevity. The anodized aluminum extrusion requires a specific welding machine to assemble, usually a welding machine with pulse and square wave capacity. Marine extrusion is the lightest and most durable material for T-top construction.

Stainless steel is also an optional material for construction. It is much heavier, more difficult, and costly to build, and may not have the structural durability or flexibility of its aluminum counterpart. However, it is often seen to be much more attractive.
