= Bonnier Corporation =

American "outdoor adventure" company

Bonnier LLC
- Parent company: Bonnier Group
- Status: Active
- Founded: March 2007
- Founder: Terry Snow
- Country of origin: United States
- Headquarters location: Winter Park, Florida
- Key people: David Ritchie (CEO); Tara Bisciello (SVP, Finance); Jonathan Moore (EVP, Events); David Butler (EVP, Digital)
- Publication types: Formerly Magazine
- Official website: bonniercorp.com

Bonnier LLC (formerly Bonnier Corporation) is an American "outdoor adventure" company that originally operated numerous U.S.-based media brands but struggled in the magazine publishing industry, leading to the decline or closure of several well-known titles. Formed in 2007 after the Bonnier Group's acquisition of publishing assets from Time, today it operates events within the vertical of outdoor recreation.

== History ==
The company was formed in March 2007 as the U.S. subsidiary of Bonnier Group, after it acquired the 18 magazines of the Time Warner divisions Time4 Media (owner of publications such as Transworld Skateboarding) and The Parenting Group (owner of publications such as Parenting) for $200 million, and combined them with its 50% stake in World Publications. In June 2009 Hachette Filipacchi sold American Photo, Boating, Flying, Sound & Vision, and Popular Photography to Bonnier.

In April 2013, Bonnier sold its skiing publications, including Skiing and Warren Miller Entertainment, to Active Interest Media. In May 2013, Bonnier sold Sound & Vision and the TransWorld Group titles to Source Interlink, and in turn acquired Source Interlink's motorcycle magazines. That month, it also sold The Parenting Group to Meredith Corporation; its publications were immediately shut down, and subscribers were transferred to other Meredith-owned publications.

In June 2015, Bonnier Corp. was defrauded of $1.5 million through a phishing e-mail scam emanating from China that targeted its accounting department. The perpetrators hacked into the email of Bonnier Corp. CEO Dave Freygang and sent instructions to the accounting department to transfer the funds to a Chinese bank account. Bonnier Corp. said money was electronically sent in two $1.5 million wire transfers four days apart. The second transfer was able to be recalled before it was received, but the first transfer could not be recovered.

In October 2020, Bonnier sold a number of its major magazines, including Popular Science, Popular Photography, Outdoor Life, and Field & Stream, to North Equity LLC. In 2022, the company began to reposition and restructure its operations, and began to brand itself as an "outdoor adventure company" to emphasize its events, focusing specifically upon core verticals of marine recreation (including boating, sailing, and fishing), hunting, and travel. The company then sold remaining of its non-Marlin branded magazines to Firecrown in 2023.

== Brands and events ==
Publication owned by Bonnier LLC:

- Marlin

Events operated by Bonnier LLC include:

- Marlin University
- Open Season Sportsman's Expo
- Offshore World Championship
- Sand Sports Super Show

=== Former ===
- American Photo
- Baby Talk
- Boating Life
- Caribbean Travel & Life
- Conceive
- Fly Fishing in Salt Waters
- Garden Design
- Home Ft. Lauderdale
- Home Miami
- Kiteboarding
- Meeting Traveler
- MotorBoating
- NewBoats.com
- Parenting
- Popular Photography
- Power Cruising
- QUAD
- Resorts & Great Hotels
- Science Illustrated
- Skiing
- Ski
- SNOW
- Spa
- Transworld Skateboarding
- Transworld Snowboarding
- Transworld Business
- Transworld Motocross
- Ride BMX
- UsedBoats.com
- WindSurfing
- YachtBroker.com
- Field & Stream
- Outdoor Life
- Popular Science
- SHOT Business
- Saveur
- Sailing World
- Salt Water Sportsman
- Sport Fishing
- Wakeboarding
- Yachting
- Boating
- Cruising World
- Florida Travel + Life
- Islands
