= Otto C. Winzen =

German-American aeronautics engineer (1917–1979)

Otto C. Winzen (1917–1979) was a German-American aeronautics engineer who made significant advances in the materials and construction of high-altitude balloons after World War II.

Winzen emigrated to the United States in 1937 and spent time during the war in internment camps.

He studied aeronautical engineering at the University of Detroit. After World War II, Winzen became involved in high-altitude balloon research, working with Jean Piccard. In 1949 he started his own company with his wife Vera Simons, called Winzen Research, Inc.

He created a number of plastic balloons, in particular of polyethylene, which he sold to the United States Army and Navy including the Skyhook balloon, and the Air Force's Project Manhigh. In 1972 he developed the Winzen Research Balloon, which achieved the record for the highest unmanned balloon flight, setting a record altitude of 51,816 m over Chico, California.

== Otto C. Winzen Lifetime Achievement Award ==
The Otto C. Winzen Lifetime Achievement Award is given out biannually by the American Institution of Aeronautics and Astronautics(AIAA) in memory of Winzen's influence on modern ballooning.

== Sources ==
- "Otto C. Winzen". Centennial of Flight Commission. Centennial of Flight Commission. November 13, 1998. Archived from the original on 2012-10-07.
- Pacheco, Luis E (2018-02-21). "Winzen, Otto C". Stratocat. Luis E. Pacheco.
- Teitel, Amy Shira (December 11, 2015). "How Otto Winzen Took Men into the Stratosphere". Popular Science. Harlan, Iowa: Bonnier Corporation.
- Teitel, Amy Shira (January 12, 2016). Breaking the Chains of Gravity: The Story of Spaceflight before NASA. New York: Bloomsbury Sigma. ISBN 9781472911179.
