= Victor Prather =

US Navy flight surgeon in "Project RAM" (1926–1961)

Doctor Victor A. Prather Jr.
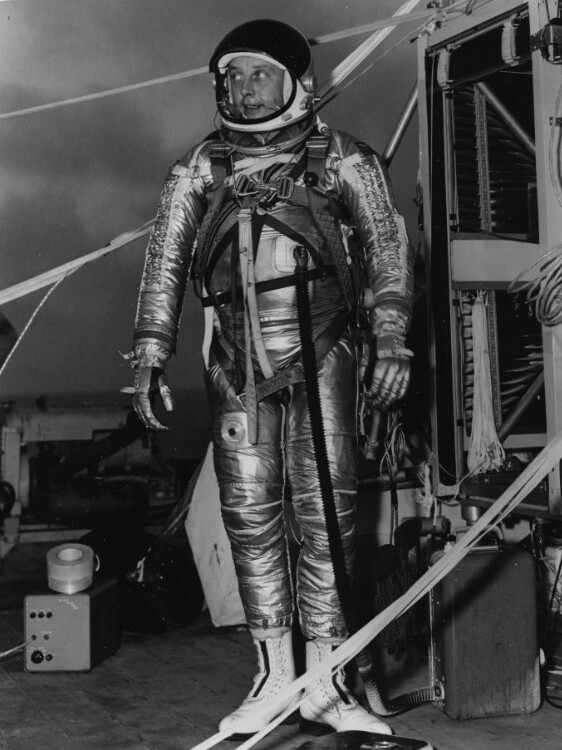
- Prather prior to Strato-Lab V balloon flight.
- Born: Victor A. Prather Jr. June 4, 1926; Lapeer, Michigan, U.S.
- Died: May 4, 1961 (aged 34); At sea in the Gulf of Mexico
- Burial place: Arlington National Cemetery
- Military career
- Allegiance: United States of America
- Branch: United States Navy
- Service years: 1943–1945, 1954–1961
- Rank: Lieutenant Commander
- Nickname: Bud
- Awards: Distinguished Flying Cross, Harmon Trophy

Lieutenant Commander Victor Alonzo Prather Jr. (June 4, 1926 – May 4, 1961) was an American flight surgeon famous for taking part in "Project RAM", a government project to develop the space suit. On May 4, 1961, Prather drowned during the helicopter transfer after the landing of the Strato-Lab V balloon flight, which set an altitude record for manned balloon flight which stood until 2012.

== Life ==
Prather was born on June 4, 1926, in Lapeer, Michigan, to Victor Prather Sr. and Gladys May Furse. He attended Tufts College in 1943, and became part of the V-12 program stationed in Honolulu, Hawaii from 1943 to 1945. He returned to Tufts at the end of WWII and attended Tufts University School of Medicine, graduating there in 1952.

In 1954, Prather rejoined the United States Navy in the Navy Medical Corps. He was stationed in Pensacola and then transferred to San Diego, CA. While at San Diego, Prather completed courses in Aviation Medicine and qualifications in fixed wing and helicopter aircraft. He was stationed as a medical doctor aboard the aircraft carrier USS Shangri-La until 1957, when he was assigned to the U.S. Naval Air Station in Port Lyautey, Morocco as Flight Surgeon for VR-24. In 1959, Prather was reassigned to the Bethesda Naval Hospital in Bethesda, Maryland.

== Project RAM ==
In 1960, Prather was transferred to Project RAM, a government program to test prototype space suits, at the Naval Medical Research Institute in Bethesda, Maryland. He was commissioned to test how the suits worked underwater, and later commissioned to see how the suits would function at extremely high altitudes.

== The flight ==
On May 4, 1961, at 7:08 am, Victor Prather, along with Cdr. Malcolm Ross, ascended in Strato-Lab High V from the flight deck of the USS Antietam (CV-36) to an altitude of 113,720 feet (34,660 meters) to test the Navy's Mark IV full-pressure suit.

The balloon, built by Winzen Research Inc. of Minneapolis, Minnesota, was constructed of polyethylene plastic only .001 inches (0.025 mm) thick. The 10 million cubic feet (280,000 m^{3}) balloon envelope was the largest that had ever been successfully launched, expanding to 300 feet (91 m) in diameter when fully inflated. Beneath the balloon hung a large parachute and then the gondola. To control temperature, the gondola was protected by special venetian blinds, but otherwise open to space. Balloon, parachute, gondola, and a trailing antenna made a craft close to 500 feet (150 m) tall.

The primary objective of the flight was to test the Mark IV full-pressure suit. The suit was manufactured by B. F. Goodrich of neoprene and weighed only 20 pounds (9.1 kg). The Mark IV suit overcame problems of weight, bulk, ventilation, air and water tightness, mobility, temperature control, and survival capabilities so well that NASA selected a modified version for use by the Project Mercury astronauts. Malcolm Ross and Victor Prather were exposed to temperatures as low as −94 °C (−137 °F) when they passed 53,000 feet (16,000 m) at 8:10 am. Strato-Lab V reached maximum elevation of 113,740 feet (34,670 m) at 9:47 am, where the temperature was −29 °C (−20 °F) and the air pressure was .09 pounds per square inch (620 Pa). At that altitude without a space suit, a person would lose consciousness in seconds. The May 4 flight was the most severe test of the Mark IV suit that was ever conducted.

The flight lasted 9 hours 54 minutes and covered a horizontal distance of 140 miles (230 km). As they descended, the balloonists opened their face masks when they reached an elevation where they could breathe. Strato-Lab V landed at 4:02 pm in the Gulf of Mexico. The mission plan was to use a boat to retrieve the balloonists in the event that the gondola landed in the water instead of on the flight deck of the carrier. This had been rehearsed. However, without orders to do so, the crew in a hovering helicopter lowered a hook. Commander Ross invited Prather to go first, but he declined. Ross stepped into the hook contrary to proper procedure and slipped partially out of it, but he was able to recover without falling completely into the water. A few minutes later, when a hook was lowered to retrieve Prather, he stood on a float attached to the gondola and grasped the rescue line. When he stepped into the hook, the trailing foot pushed the gondola away, and he fell backwards 3 feet (0.91 m) into the water. The helicopter crew assumed that the flight suit was watertight, which it would have been if the face plate was still closed, and did not effect an immediate rescue. Because the face plate was open, Prather's flight suit flooded, and he drowned before Navy divers could rescue him.

== After the flight ==
Shortly after Prather's death, President John F. Kennedy phoned Prather's widow, Virginia Merritt, and she arrived at the White House with her children, Marla Lee Prather and Victor A. Prather III. Kennedy posthumously awarded Victor Prather the Navy Distinguished Flying Cross for 'heroism and extraordinary achievement'. The balloonists were also awarded the 1961 Harmon Trophy for Aeronauts. The altitude record for a manned balloon flight set by Prather and Ross in 1961 is still officially recognized by Fédération Aéronautique Internationale. As of 2021 three balloonists have traveled higher into the stratosphere. Nicholas Piantanida claimed to have reached 123,800 feet (37,700 m) with his Strato Jump II balloon on February 2, 1966, and Felix Baumgartner reached 128,100 feet (39 044.88 meters) on 14 October 2012 as part of the Red Bull Stratos project. In ballooning, as in mountain climbing, completing the descent by the same method is required to set a record. Piantanida did not claim the balloon altitude record because he jettisoned his balloon at the flight ceiling and returned to Earth in the gondola without the balloon. Similarly, Baumgartner jumped at the apex of his flight. The third person, Alan Eustace, reached an altitude of 136,000 feet (41,000 m) where he then performed a supersonic jump in 2014.

== See also ==
- Flight altitude record
- Manned balloon altitude records
- Malcolm Ross
