= Transworld Motocross =

American motocross magazine

- Frequency: Monthly
- Total circulation: 103,605 (December 2012)
- Founded: 2000
- Final issue: 2019
- Company: Motor Trend Group
- Country: United States
- Based in: Carlsbad, California
- Language: English
- Website: TransworldMotocross.com
- ISSN: 1533-6212

Transworld Motocross (TWMX) was a magazine that covered motocross and motocross racing based in Carlsbad, California. The magazine was launched in 2000.

The magazine's content includes: racing, event coverage, freestyle motocross, bike maintenance, riding tips and product reviews.

Transworld Motocross is a Transworld Media brand, which also published the magazines Transworld Surf, Transworld Skateboarding, and Transworld Snowboarding. In 2013, most of the Transworld titles were sold by Bonnier to Source Interlink Media (now the TEN Publishing). Since then, TEN Publishing has been sold to American Media, LLC who shuttered all Transworld Media publications.

== Advertising ==
Advertiser MTV Asia Target 2001 Bizart MFN LD, Reference Brand Strategy Motocross Action Magazine.
