= Outdoor Life Conservation Pledge =

The Outdoor Life Conservation Pledge was established in 1946 and then revised in 1993. The pledge was written to remind readers of Outdoor Life magazine and other sportsmen of the vigilance needed to preserve the natural world. The pledge has been taken by thousands of people including Harry S. Truman and Al Gore, and it runs on the letters page of every issue of Outdoor Life.

The current pledge reads:

I pledge to protect and conserve the natural resources of America. I promise to educate future generations so they may become caretakers of our water, air, land and wildlife.

Along with the pledge, two awards are given annually by the magazine to honor an individual in the private sector and one in the public sector. The Outdoor Life Conservation Award was first presented in 1923 to those who "accomplish the greatest good for the sportsmen's cause in the United States," said founder J. A. McGuire. Ordinary people and celebrities have both received the award. Probably the most famous recipient is Jimmy Carter.

The original pledge was:

I give my pledge as an American to save and faithfully to defend from waste the natural resources of my country—its soil and minerals, its forests, waters, and wildlife.

That pledge was chosen in a 1946 contest with western novelist L.L. Foreman receiving $3000 for the winning entry. The second place prize of $1000 went to biologist Rachel Carson who would years later write Silent Spring.

The original version of the pledge is shown in the 1972 science-fiction film Silent Running, which prominently involves conservation and environmentalism.
