= Charles B. Moore =

American scientist

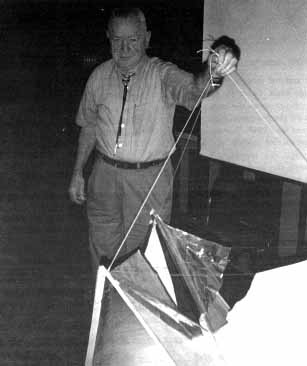
- Atmospheric physicist Charles B. Moore displays a radar reflector
- Born: October 28, 1920; Maryville, Tennessee, U.S.
- Died: March 2, 2010

Charles Bachman Moore Jr. (October 28, 1920 – March 2, 2010) was an American physicist, engineer and meteorologist, known for his research on atmospheric physics and his work with gas balloons. He was born in Maryville, Tennessee.

== Career ==
Moore attended college at Georgia Institute of Technology in 1940. During World War II, he served as a weather equipment officer for the U.S. Army Air Corps in the China-Burma-India theater, and later in occupied China. Moore returned to Georgia Tech after the war, and received a bachelor's degree in chemical engineering in 1947.

Moore was recruited as a project engineer for Project Mogul in 1947 by New York University geophysicist Athelstan Spilhaus, who headed the Balloon Group within the project. Project Mogul, led by Dr. James Peoples and his assistant Albert P. Crary, made use of Moore's work in materials science allowing the construction of balloons which could better withstand cold temperatures and safely rise to significantly greater altitudes. A balloon that Moore helped launch in New Mexico on June 4, 1947, was later identified as the source of the debris found on the Foster ranch which led to UFO conspiracy theories and claims surrounding the Roswell incident. In 1952, Life magazine reported Moore and colleague had witnessed an unidentified flying object on April 24, 1949.

In 1953, Moore joined the Arthur D. Little Corporation and worked with Bernard Vonnegut to develop techniques for vaporizing sodium, cesium, and calcium from rockets for high-altitude studies of winds and sodium in the upper atmosphere. They collaborated on over 50 publications related to atmospheric electricity. Moore worked at the General Mills Aeronautical Research Laboratory throughout the 1950s, participating in a number of projects sponsored by the Office of Naval Research aimed at developing both military and intelligence applications for balloons, including attempts to drop anti-Soviet leaflets from balloons and the use of balloons for surveillance purposes. Moore was also known for his 1959 expedition to the stratosphere with Malcolm Ross, in which they performed the first spectrographic analysis of the planet Venus which was free of interference from the Earth's atmosphere, thereby proving the existence of water on that planet; this expedition involved an ascent to 89,000 feet (27 km, then a record for altitude).

In 1969, Moore became the chairman of Langmuir Laboratory for Atmospheric Research and greatly expanded the lab's facilities.

Moore was a professor of atmospheric physics at the New Mexico Institute of Mining and Technology in Socorro for several years, and nominally retired in 1985; however, he continued his research afterward, and his subsequent discoveries led to the first improvement in the design of the lightning rod since that device's invention by Benjamin Franklin.

== Awards and honors ==
Moore has received a number of professional and academic honors.

- New Mexico Tech, Distinguished Research Award, 1984
- American Institute of Aeronautics and Astronautics 1997 Lifetime Achievement Award
- Royal Meteorological Society fellowship
- American Meteorological Society fellowship
- American Association for the Advancement of Science fellowship
- American Geophysical Union fellowship
