= Outdoor Life =

American magazine

- Cover of 125th anniversary issue (2023)
- Editor: Alex Robinson
- General Manager: Adam Morath
- Categories: Hunting, fishing, sporting magazine
- Frequency: Quarterly
- Total circulation: 752,668 (December 2012)
- First issue: January 1898
- Company: Recurrent Ventures
- Country: USA
- Based in: New York City
- Language: English
- Website: www.outdoorlife.com
- ISSN: 0030-7076

Outdoor Life is an outdoors magazine about camping, fishing, hunting, and survival. For years, it was a sister magazine of Field & Stream. Together with Sports Afield, they are considered the Big Three of American outdoor publishing by Money magazine. Outdoor Life was launched in Denver, Colorado, in January 1898. Founder and editor-in-chief (1898–1929), J. A. McGuire, intended Outdoor Life to be a magazine for sportsmen, written by sportsmen, covering all aspects of the outdoor arena.

== History ==
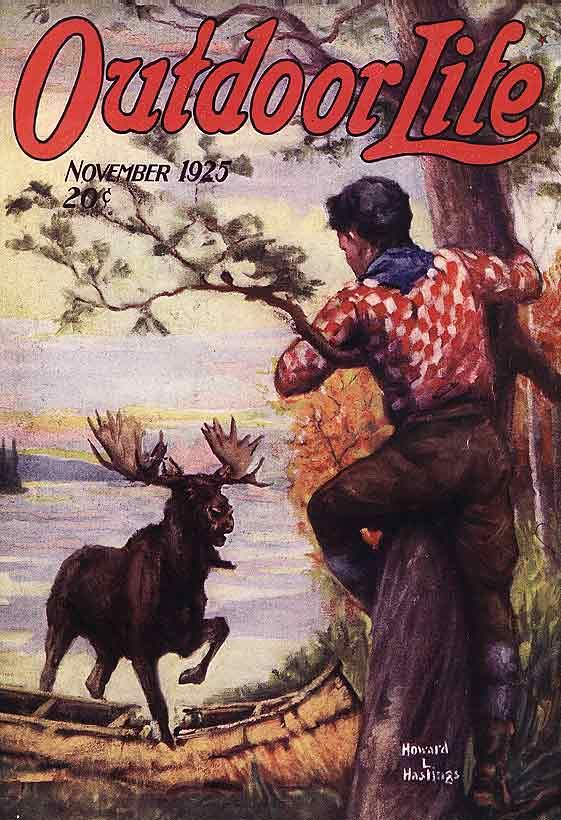
Cover of November 1925 issue

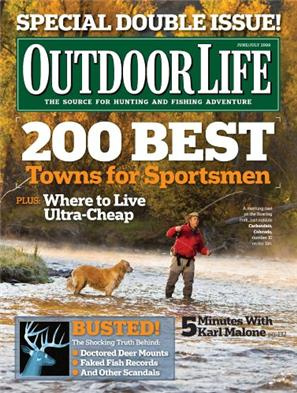
Cover of the June/July 2009 issue

The first issue covered topics including a moose hunt in Alaska and advice about Native Americans. Some of the original sections were titled, "Photography", "Trap and Target", and "In the Game and Field".

Outdoor Life was an innovative publication. In 1903, the first photograph was printed on the cover in black and white. A short time later, in 1906, the first color cover appeared on the magazine.

Outdoor Life's editorial coverage followed its audience's interests in new developments, such as aviation, boating, and motor vehicles. However, it stayed true to its original focus: the outdoorsman. Over the years, many notable people have contributed to the magazine: former President Teddy Roosevelt contributed from 1901 to 1904; Zane Grey, a well-known adventure writer and big game fisherman, was a frequent contributor between 1918 and 1932; and Ernest Hemingway was accompanied by an Outdoor Life writer on a marlin fishing trip to Cuba in 1935. Other famous contributors include Amelia Earhart, Clark Gable, and Babe Ruth.

In 1934, Outdoor Life moved from its original location in Denver to New York City, where it remains today. For many years, Outdoor Life was owned by the Popular Science Publishing Company, which was purchased by Times Mirror in 1967. Time Inc. bought the Times Mirror magazines in 2001. In 2007, Time Warner sold Outdoor Life and several other publications to Bonnier Corporation. In 2020, Bonnier Corporation sold the publication and several other titles to North Equity. North Equity formed Recurrent Ventures as holding company for the acquired publications.

Outdoor Life was reduced from 9 issues a year to a quarterly publication in January 2018.

On June 9, 2021, Outdoor Life announced ceasing print publication and moving to an entirely digital format.

== Other media and awards ==
The magazine licensed their title to the Outdoor Life Network cable channel from its 1996 launch until 2006, when the network dramatically de-emphasized programs about fishing and hunting, and changed their name to Versus (which would eventually become NBCSN). The Outdoor Life Network name was retained on the Canadian version of the channel.

The Outdoor Life Conservation Award was first given in 1923 to those who “accomplish the greatest good for the sportsmen’s cause in the United States,” said founder J.A. McGuire; Jimmy Carter is the most famous recipient. There is also an Outdoor Life Conservation Pledge. Established in 1946 and then revised in 1993, it has been taken by thousands of people including Harry Truman and Al Gore, and it runs on the letters page of every issue of the magazine. The pledge reads: “I pledge to protect and conserve the natural resources of America. I promise to educate future generations so they may become caretakers of our water, air, land and wildlife.” In 2004, the magazine released a computer game.

The editorial content of the magazine has been critical of PETA and other animal rights groups, and anti-hunting groups.
