= Robin Wolaner =

- Born: 1954 (age 71–72)
- Education: Cornell University
- Occupations: Entrepreneur, business author
- Employer: CNET
- Known for: Founder of Parenting magazine and TeeBeeDee
- Title: Director of Credo Mobile

Robin Wolaner (born 1954) is an entrepreneur and business author. In February 2015 she became COO of We Care Solar, a nonprofit that provides its Solar Suitcase to power last-mile health clinics in the developing world. In September 2015 the United Nations' Department of Economic and Social Affairs awarded We Care Solar the inaugural "Powering the Future We Want" award for innovations in sustainable development.

Currently a director of Credo mobile, she is the founder of TeeBeeDee, an online network for baby boomers that launched in 2007 and folded in 2009. She was an executive at CNET from 1997 to 2002; after leaving CNET, she wrote a book of business advice for women and became an advisor to tech startups. In 1985, she founded Parenting magazine, later sold to Time Inc. Her founding of Parenting is documented in one of the most popular case studies by Harvard Business School, taught to all first-year students of the school. She graduated from Cornell University in 1975 with a bachelor of science in industrial and labor relations.
