= Caribbean Travel & Life =

Travel magazine

- Categories: travel magazine
- Frequency: 8 per year
- Founded: 1986
- Final issue: January/February 2013
- Company: Bonnier
- Country: USA
- Based in: Winter Park, Florida
- Language: English
- Website: www.caribbeantravelmag.com
- ISSN: 0891-9496

Caribbean Travel & Life was dedicated to the Caribbean region and was named the official consumer publication of the Caribbean Tourism Organization and the Caribbean Hotel Association.

The magazine wove together the geographical and cultural threads that make each of the region's destinations distinctive, and presented a range of essential service information on the various aspects of travel (resorts, dining and activities). Caribbean Travel & Life was published by Bonnier Corporation; predecessor World Publications bought Caribbean Travel & Life in 1997. Both companies published the magazine from Winter Park, Florida. The founding company is Caribbean Travel and Life, Inc. which published the magazine in Alexandria, Virginia, and then, in Silver Spring, Maryland, before moved it to Winter Park, Florida.

On November 29, 2012, Bonnier announced that it would close Caribbean Travel & Life, with the January/February edition as its final issue in 2013. Bonnier would fold the magazine and its content to its sister, Islands.
