= Center console (boat) =

Type of boat

Small center console boat.

A center console (British English: centre console) sometimes abbreviated as CC, is a type of single-decked open hull boat where the helm is in the center. There is a cabin on some models; these are usually located in the bow and hold small berths for sleeping. Small berths may also be located inside the console and under the deck of larger center console boats. An advantage of this type of boat, especially in fishing, underway, and at rest, is that a person can walk all around the boat from stern to bow with ease which aids in various activities by removing obstacles which may be encountered with other boat designs.

The console of a boat is where all the controls are located, including steering, ignition, trim control, radio and other electronic devices, switches etc. It may have small storage space and/or a head. In general, there is no weather protection or berths, making the design ill-suited to cruising.

To provide limited relief from sun or rain, or for mounting items such as antennae, radar, lights and outriggers, the console may have a "T-Top" or "Hard top" which is a structure permanently mounted to the boat above the console. These are not universal to all center consoles because it may interfere with fishermen's casting or the boat owner's preferences. Some boats, including center consoles like the one pictured here may have a Bimini top instead, while some may not have anything permanently or semi-permanently attached.

Most center consoles are powered by outboard motors and may be equipped with one or two which is common, to five or more in the case of very large center console boats.

Center console boats are popular as yacht tenders or ship's boats, and also for fishing. One survey by Sport Fishing Magazine found that 30% of respondents owned center consoles, which was a larger percentage than other boat designs.

Center console boats typically range in length from 18 to 40 feet (5 to 12 m), though some may be larger.
