= Marlin (magazine) =

American fishing magazine

Marlin Magazine
- Editor-in-Chief: Jack Vitek
- Categories: Fishing, Recreational fishing, Big-game fishing
- Frequency: 7 issues per year
- Total circulation: 40,236 (December 2012)
- First issue: 1981/1982
- Company: Bonnier Corporation
- Country: USA
- Based in: Winter Park, Florida
- Language: English
- Website: www.marlinmag.com

Marlin is a digital and print magazine that covers big-game fishing around the world. Its headquarters are in Winter Park, Florida, and is published by the Bonnier Corporation.

Jack Vitek is Editor-in-Chief of the magazine. Marlin contains updates on the world's hottest billfishing destinations, insider tips on live-baiting and trolling, glimpses of people influencing the sport and reviews on the latest equipment.
