= Parenting (magazine) =

Former magazine for families published in United States between 1987 and 2013

- Categories: Parenting
- Frequency: 11 per year
- Publisher: Robin Wolaner
- Total circulation: 2,227,351 (2011)
- Founded: 1987
- Final issue: July 2013
- Company: Bonnier
- Country: United States
- Based in: Winter Park, Florida
- Language: English
- Website: www.parenting.com
- ISSN: 0890-247X

Parenting was a magazine for families and it was published in United States between 1987 and 2013. Its final headquarters was in Winter Park, Florida.

== History and profile ==
Parenting was launched in 1987 by Robin Wolaner in a joint venture funded by Time Inc., which became the sole owner in 1990. In February 2009, the magazine became two separate, age-targeted editions: Parenting Early Years, for moms of infants, toddlers and preschoolers, and Parenting School Years, for moms with kids in kindergarten through age 12. Meredith Corporation, which owns Parents, the magazine's biggest competitor, bought Parenting in May 2013 and shuttered the title in July 2013. Parenting.com, its companion website, lives on.

With a total average circulation of 2,200,000 and an audience of more than 9 million, Parenting was the flagship of the Parenting Group family, which includes the monthly Babytalk magazine; Working Mother magazine; Conceive; the Parenting.com website; MomConnection, an online research network; and a custom content unit.

Its website, Parenting.com, reproduces many features that were in the magazine. The site also features a pregnancy planner with fetal development photos, pregnancy info synchronized to a mother's due date with customized newsletters, a baby naming tool with thousands of name descriptions, a fertility calculator, buying guides and blogs, and with resources for health, safety and child development.

In January 1997, The Parenting Group relocated from San Francisco to New York City, where Janet Chan was named editor-in-chief of Parenting and editorial director of The Parenting Group.

In 2003, Parenting was awarded the industry's highest honor – a National Magazine Award for General Excellence in the 2 million+ category – "the best of the biggest."

Parenting followed up its National Magazine Award-winning year by taking over parenting category ad page leadership from long-time competitor Parents in 2004. That multi-year growth story won Parenting placement on Adweek magazine's 2005 "Hot List," which acknowledges the ten best performers in the magazine industry.

In May 2004, Zagat Survey teamed up with Parenting magazine to release its first U.S. Family Travel Guide. Developed by families for families, the guide offers travel advice with family-oriented ratings and reviews for more than 1000 sites and attractions, including amusement parks, ballparks, historic sites & monuments, national parks, zoos and more. The guide also covers family-friendly hotels and restaurants.

Live with Regis and Kelly partnered with Parenting on their Beautiful Baby Search for several years. The winner of the contest received a $125,000 prize and appeared on the cover of an upcoming issue of Parenting.

In March 2007, Time Inc. sold 18 of its magazines to the Sweden-based Bonnier Group, including Parenting magazine. Time Inc.'s Parenting Group and Time4 Media titles have combined with Bonnier's U.S. magazine partner, World Publications, to form a new company called Bonnier Corporation.

Greg Schumann was named vice president, group publisher of The Parenting Group in October 2007. Under his leadership, the magazine experienced significant advertising and circulation growth, leading to Parenting being named to Advertising Age's Magazine 2010 A-List, taking the #6 spot in recognition of its "versioning strategy."

In March 2009, Parenting introduced a prosocial initiative to connect and celebrate parents advocating for better schools, the Mom Congress on Education and Learning The magazine hosted 51 outstanding mom education advocates from across the country at Georgetown University in May 2010, and met with education leaders including U.S. Secretary of Education Arne Duncan about the importance of family engagement in education.

In May 2013, Bonnier sold Parenting and its sister publications to Meredith Corporation; all employees were laid off and Parenting ceased publication immediately. Subscribers were transferred to other Meredith publications.

== Similar magazines ==
- Parents
- FamilyFun
- American Baby
- Babytalk
- New Parent
- Scholastic Parent & Child
- Baby & Toddler
- You & Your Family
- Working Mother
