= Project Strato-Lab =

US Navy 1950s–60s high-altitude manned balloon program

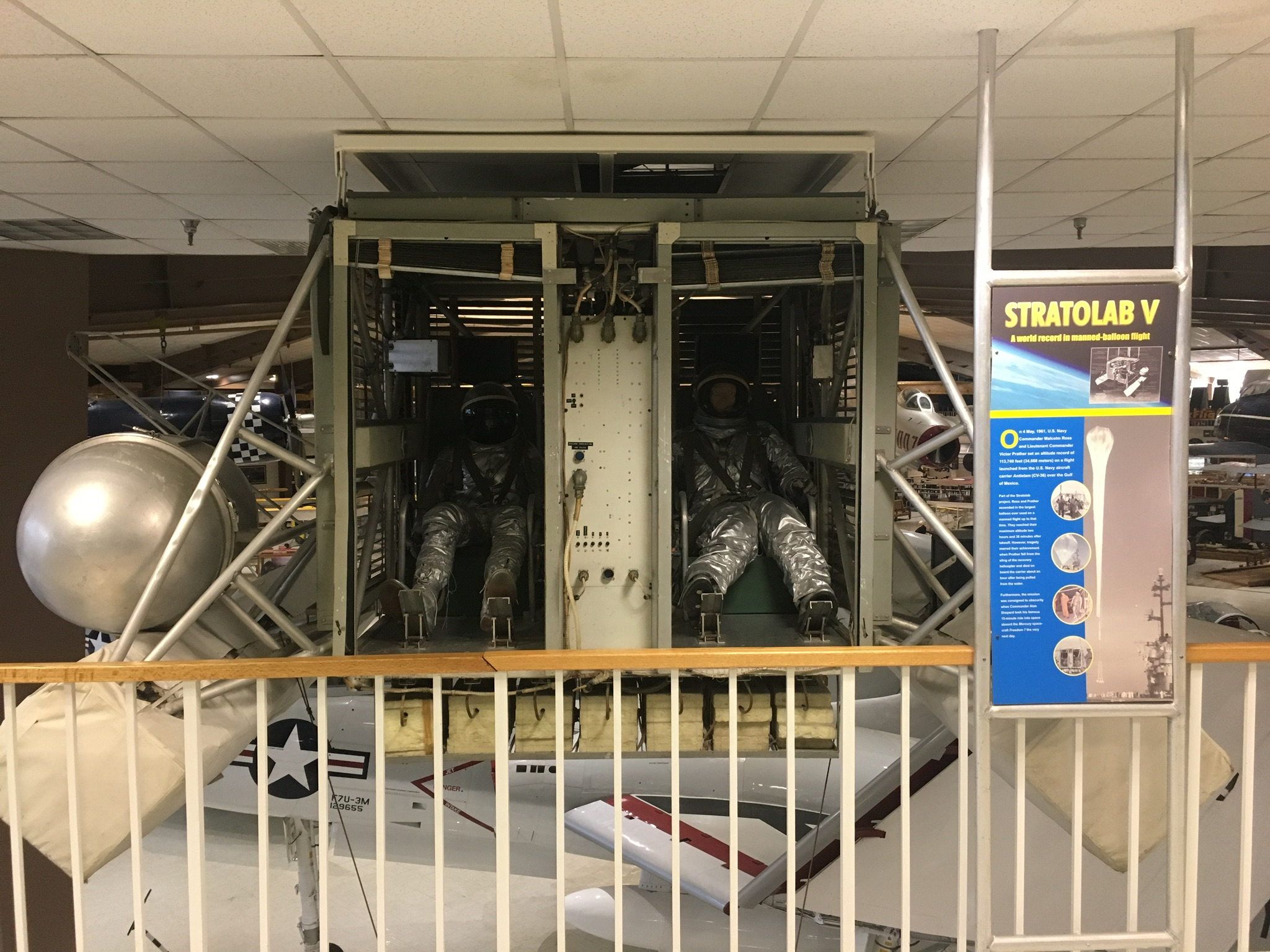
Project Strato-Lab V gondola display, National Naval Aviation Museum, November 2019

Project Strato-Lab was a series of high-altitude manned balloon flights sponsored by the United States Navy during the 1950s and early 1960s. The Strato-Lab program lifted the first Americans into the upper reaches of the stratosphere since World War II. Project Strato-Lab developed out of the Navy's unmanned balloon program, Project Skyhook. The program was established in 1954 and administrated by Commander Malcolm Ross (United States Navy). Malcolm Ross and others developed the program to accomplish research required for the manned rocket program to follow. This program provided biomedical data that was used for subsequent efforts in space. Malcolm Ross launched five numbered flights (Strato-Lab 1 through Strato-Lab 5) as well as other unnumbered flights.

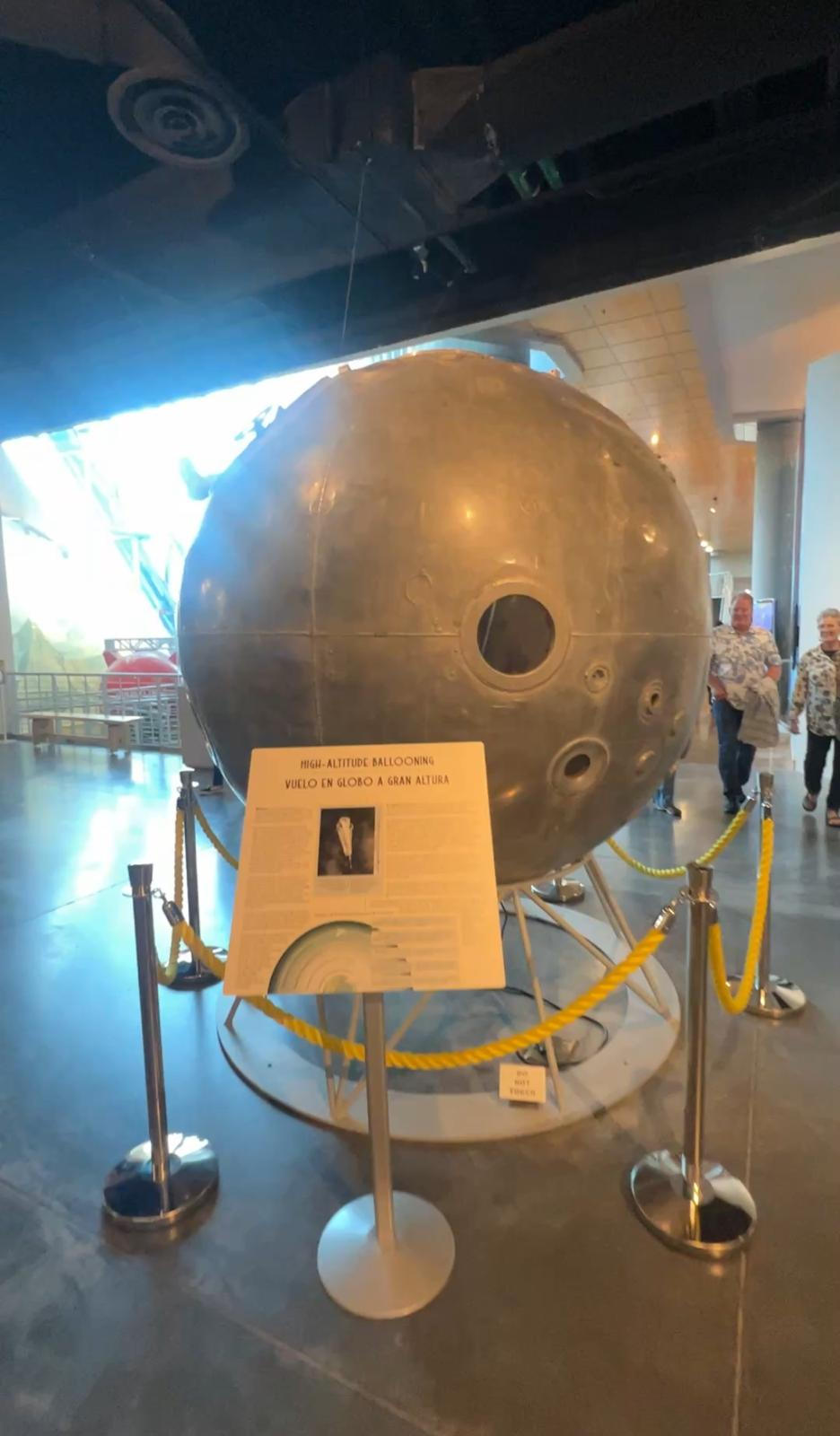
The initial Strato-Lab gondola was constructed by General Mills, Inc. in 1954 for Jean Piccard's Project Helios. After some time in storage it was then refurbished by Winzen Research for the Navy. Seen here on display at the Anderson Abruzzo Albuquerque International Balloon Museum.

Strato-Lab was developed to allow humans to make observations and perform experiments in the upper reaches of the stratosphere using balloons constructed of a thin polyethylene plastic film. These balloons were developed during the earlier Projects Helios and Skyhook by Jean Piccard and Otto C. Winzen. Their purpose was to reduce the weight of the balloons to a fraction of previous rubber balloons. The Strato Lab program used both open and pressurized gondolas built by Winzen Research Inc and the balloon program in the Mechanical Division of General Mills, Inc. Strato-Lab built on the earlier programs with goals to obtain fundamental data in the fields of astronomy, astro and atmospheric physics, and human physiology at high altitudes.

The Strato-Lab flights made a number of contributions to the manned space flight program. One set of experiments demonstrated that protons from solar flare activity posed a serious risk to humans working in space. This contributed to developing methods of predicting and monitoring solar flare activity. Strato-Lab also contributed to early astronomical observations above the bulk of the Earth's atmosphere. Secondarily to the scientific objectives of the program, Strato-Lab set a number of records for scientific endeavor and general aeronautics.

The Strato-Lab flights culminated in a record-setting flight on May 4, 1961, by Commander Malcolm Ross and Lieutenant Commander Victor Prather (USN) to test the Navy's Mark IV full-pressure suit. The Mark IV suit overcame problems of weight, bulk, ventilation, air and water tightness, mobility, temperature control, and survival capabilities so well that NASA selected a modified version for use by the Project Mercury astronauts. The May 4 flight was the most severe test of the suits conducted. The flight set an altitude record of 113,740 feet (34.67 km), lasted 9 hours 54 minutes, and covered a horizontal distance of 140 miles (230 km). The research goals of the flight were successful, but Victor Prather drowned during the helicopter recovery from the Gulf of Mexico.

For the record ascent, President John F. Kennedy presented the balloonists (Victor Prather, posthumously to his wife) the 1961 Harmon Trophy for Aeronauts. The Soviet cosmonaut Yuri Gagarin had orbited the Earth almost a month earlier, on April 12, 1961; and the next day, on May 5, Alan Shepard flew a sub-orbital trajectory on the Mercury Redstone rocket.
