= Babytalk (magazine) =

American parenting magazine

- Categories: Parenting magazine
- Frequency: Monthly
- First issue: 1935
- Final issue: July 2013
- Company: Meredith Corp.
- Country: USA
- Based in: New York City
- Language: English
- Website: www.babytalk.com
- ISSN: 1092-1869

Babytalk, America's oldest baby magazine, was launched in 1935 as a supplement to customers of a national cloth diaper delivery service based in New Jersey. The free monthly publication aimed to help new mothers trust their maternal instincts with "straight talk" from experts and real moms. Babytalk was part of The Parenting Group, which includes Parenting magazine; the Parenting.com website; Working Mother magazine; Conceive; MomConnection, an online research tool; and a custom content unit. Meredith Corporation, which owns American Baby, Babytalk's biggest competitor, bought Babytalk in May 2013 and shuttered the title.

With a controlled circulation of 2,000,000, Babytalk reached more than 5.5 million readers a month through a combination of in-home subscriptions and distribution at baby retailers, maternity boutiques and OB/GYN offices across the country. Babytalk was distributed at Babies "R" Us, BuyBuyBaby, and Baby Depot, among others.

Many of the features in the magazine were reproduced on sister publication Parenting's website, Parenting.com. The site also features a Pregnancy Planner, with fetal development photos, a customized newsletter and pregnancy info synchronized to a mother's due date; a baby namer tool, with thousands of name descriptions; a fertility calculator, buying guides, blogs, along with resources for health and safety, and child development.

In 2001, Babytalk became the first parenting magazine to feature a child with Down syndrome on the cover.

== History ==
Editor-in-chief Susan Kane led the successful repositioning of all three publications in the Babytalk franchise in 2005 – Babytalk, Babytalk Mom-to-Be, and Babytalk First Months. Under Kane's leadership, Babytalk garnered several industry awards, including a 2005 American Society of Magazine Editors National Magazine Award win in the Personal Service category for an article on breastfeeding.

Beginning in 2005, Babytalk hosted "World's Biggest Playgroup" gatherings across the country. Aimed at new moms and their babies, this popular event featured live kids' entertainment, music classes, valet stroller parking, raffles, giveaways, and photo opportunities. In the past, the event has taken place in Westminster, California, New York City, and at the Mall of America in Minneapolis.

The magazine encountered controversy in 2006 when the August issue depicted a breastfeeding baby on the cover. An Associated Press article on public reaction to the image sparked hundreds of newspaper articles and TV segments highlighting the challenges that women face when attempting to breastfeed—along with more than 8,000 letters applauding the decision to feature a nursing mom on the cover of a national magazine.

Babytalk also partnered with Good Morning America on its annual Cover Contest for several years. In 2006, viewers voted online to choose the winner, Abigail Goldman of Cherry Hill, NJ, who appeared on the cover of the October 2006 issue of Babytalk and received a $5,000 shopping spree at Babies "R" Us.

Ana Connery was named editor of Babytalk in 2009, and was promoted to director of The Parenting Group's print content operations in September 2010. In May 2013 the magazine was sold to Meredith Corp., and following the change in ownership it ceased publication.
