= Winzen Research =

- Founded: 1949
- Headquarters: Minneapolis, Minnesota, U.S.
- Products: Balloons

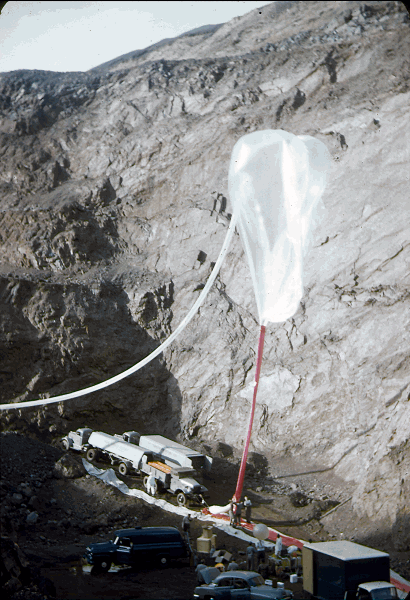
Inflating Winzen Research balloon for 1958 manned flight to the stratosphere

Winzen Research Inc, Minneapolis, Minnesota, created balloons in the 1950s and 1960s that were used by the United States Navy in its Projects Helios, Skyhook, and Strato-Lab. Balloons were also sold to the United States Air Force for use in Project Manhigh and for a secret reconnaissance mission, called Moby Dick, to overfly the Soviet Union.

Otto C. Winzen developed the use of polyethylene resin for plastic balloons. Polyethylene balloons vastly reduced the weight in comparison with previously used rubber materials. Polyethylene was light, relatively cheap, and unaffected by ultraviolet radiation. Winzen refined the manufacturing techniques to reduce the plastics used in the balloons to less than the thickness of a human hair

The company was created by Otto Winzen and his wife Vera Simons. Vera, eventually an accomplished balloonist herself, borrowed money from her parents to help start Winzen Research. She held over two-thirds ownership of the company and became its vice president. Vera supervised and trained her "balloon girls" to handle polyethylene and build the giant balloons.

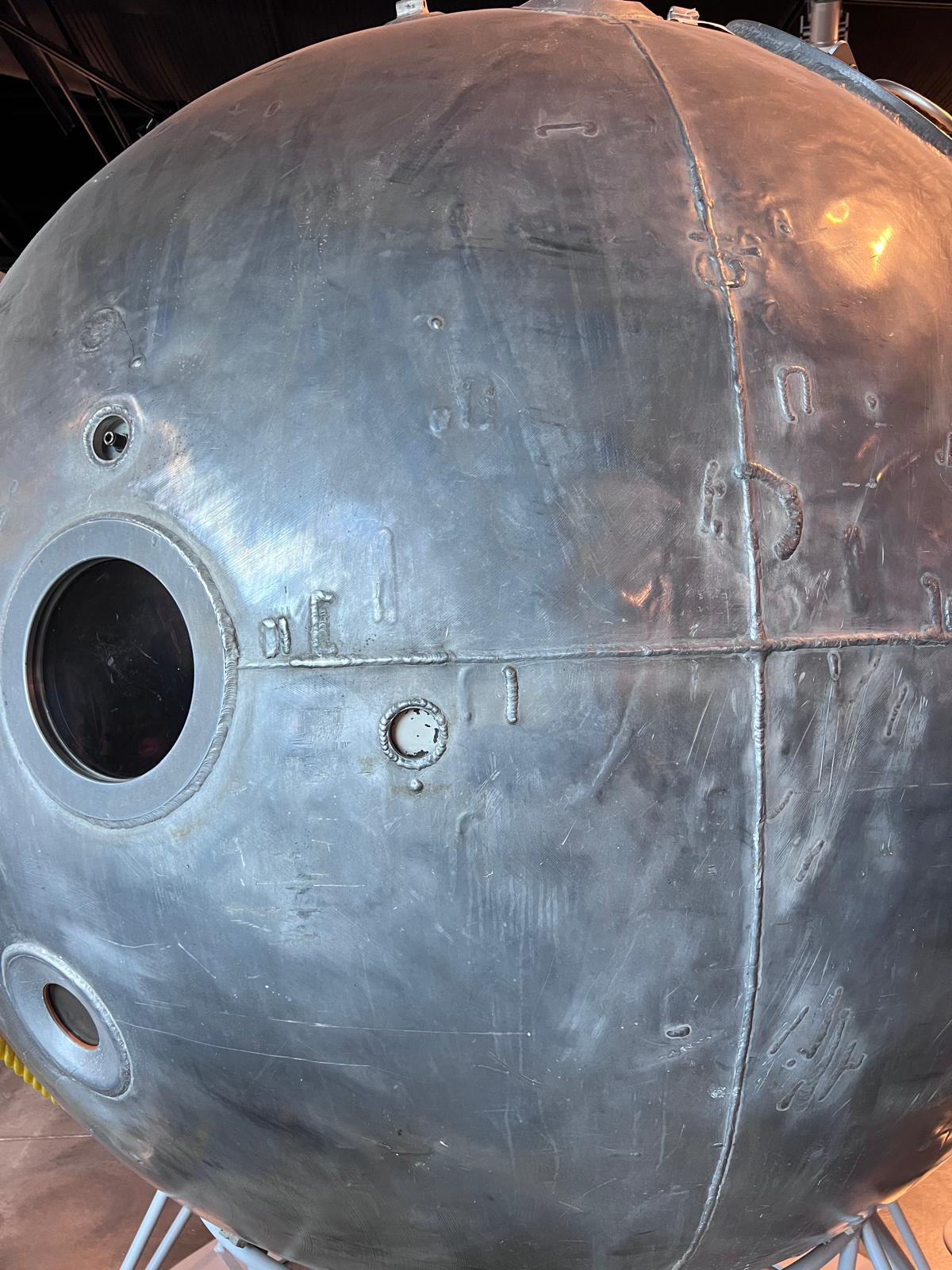
Gondola originally built by General Mills then refurbished by Wizen for the US Navy's Project Strato-Lab.

Winzen Research also designed and built gondolas. The company supplied both the balloon and gondola that were used for the 1961 Strato-Lab V flight that set current altitude record for manned balloon flights. The balloon was constructed of polyethylene plastic measuring only .001 inches (0.025 mm) thick. At 10 million cubic feet (280,000 m^{3}), the balloon envelope was the largest that had ever been successfully launched, expanding to 300 feet (91 m) in diameter when fully inflated. Beneath the balloon hung a large parachute and then the gondola. Winzen Research designed a unique gondola for the flight. To control temperature, the gondola was protected by special venetian blinds, but otherwise open to space. The venetian blinds had light and dark sides. The light side could be turned outwards to cool the cabin while the dark side could be turned outward to warm the cabin. Balloon, parachute, gondola, and a trailing antenna made a craft close to 500 feet (150 m) tall.
