= Boating (magazine) =

American enthusiast magazine

- Cover of the November–December 2023 issue
- Categories: Enthusiast magazine
- Frequency: 10 per year
- Total circulation: 157,566 (2013)
- Founded: 1966
- Company: Firecrown
- Country: United States
- Based in: Winter Park, Florida
- Language: English
- Website: www.boatingmag.com
- ISSN: 0006-5374

Boating is an American enthusiast magazine published by Firecrown.

== History ==
The magazine was started in 1966 by Ziff Davis in Chicago, Illinois.

== Publishers ==
Dates	Publisher
1966 – 1985	Ziff Davis
1985 – 1987	CBS Magazines
1987 – 1988	Diamandis
1988 – 2009	Hachette Filipacchi Media U.S.
2009 – 2023	Bonnier Magazine Group
2023 – present	Firecrown
