= Salt Water Sportsman =

American magazine

- Categories: Sports/fishing
- Frequency: Monthly
- Total circulation: 137,086 (December 2012)
- Founded: 1939
- Company: Firecrown
- Country: United States
- Based in: Winter Park, Florida
- Language: English
- Website: www.saltwatersportsman.com

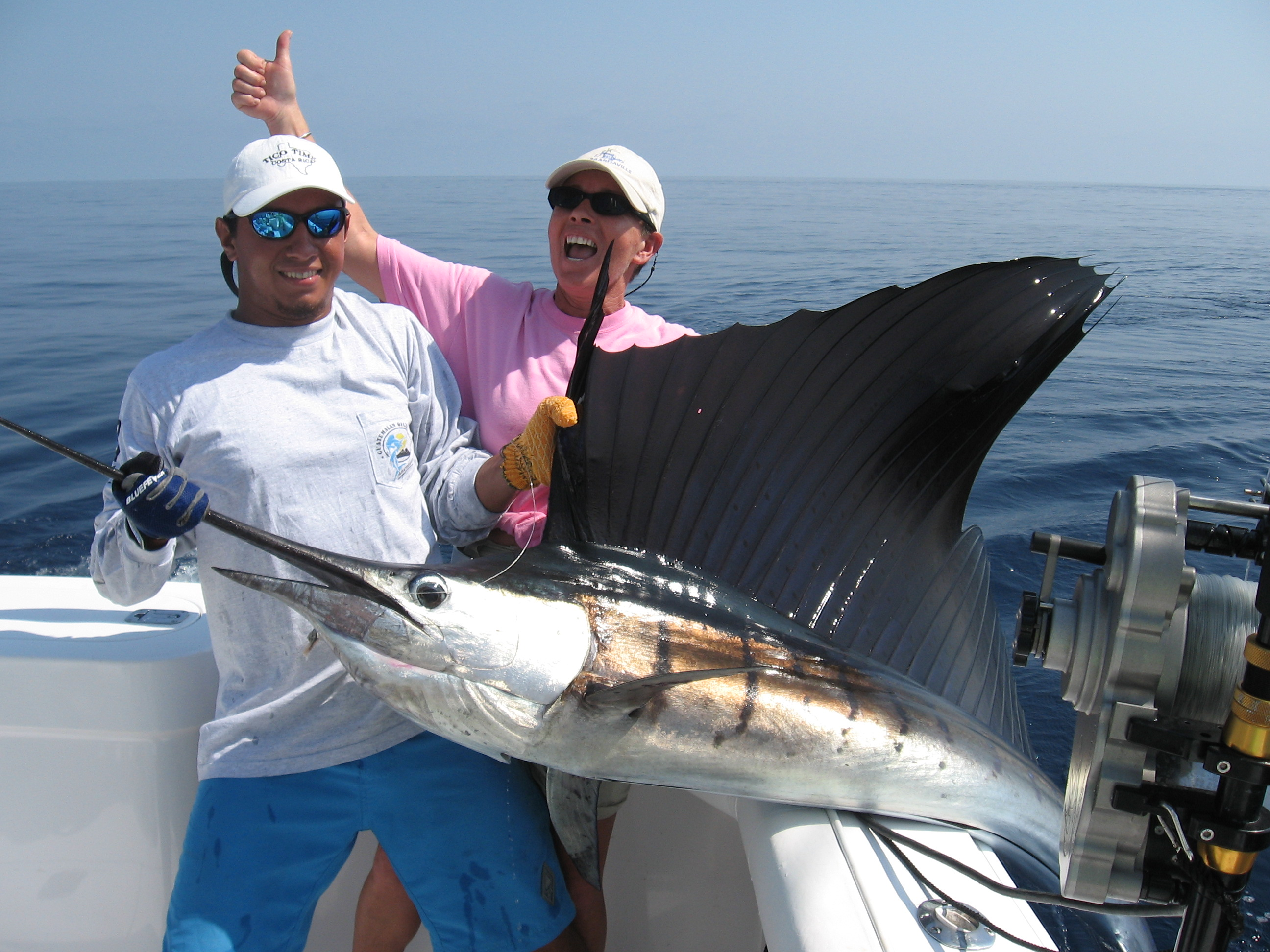
Costa Rica Fishing at Los Suenos and Jaco Beach

Salt Water Sportsman is a monthly magazine about recreational marine fishing in the United States and throughout the world. Originally published in Boston, Massachusetts in 1939, Salt Water Sportsman expanded from its roots covering New England waters to address saltwater fishing issues throughout the world. The magazine is based in Winter Park, Florida.

Nate Matthews is the editor-in-chief of the magazine. Topics covered in Salt Water Sportsman include fishing techniques, knots, rods and reels, fishing line, lures, rigs, boats and marine and outboard motors. The magazine has also covered fishing spots throughout Florida, the Gulf Coast, Southeast, Northeast and West Coast of the United States, Alaska and Hawaii, as well as the Bahamas, Mexico, South America, Australia and Africa. The magazine has published articles on how to catch specific kinds of fish, including dolphin (otherwise known as "dorado" or mahi-mahi), yellowfin tuna, snapper and flounder.

In recent years, the magazine has taken stances on conservation issues such as commercial overfishing, catch and release, mercury contamination and marine habitat degradation.
