= Skyhook balloon =

Atmospheric research device

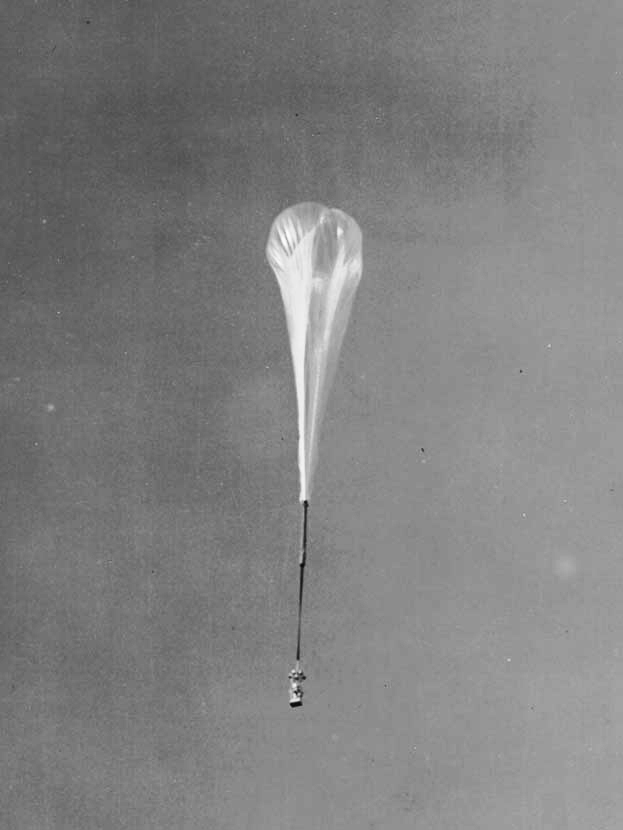
A Skyhook balloon launched in 1957 to photograph the Sun

Skyhook balloons were high-altitude balloons developed by Otto C. Winzen and General Mills, Inc. They were used by the United States Navy Office of Naval Research (ONR) in the late 1940s and 1950s for atmospheric research, especially for constant-level meteorological observations at very high altitudes. Instruments like the Cherenkov detector were first used on Skyhook balloons.

== Project Skyhook ==
In the late 1940s, Project Skyhook was conceived of as a means by which plastic balloons could be used to transmit or send instruments into the stratosphere to conduct research. This project carried forward work from an earlier project, Helios, that General Mills and Jean Piccard initiated to use arrays of giant plastic balloons to carry humans aloft.

Balloons, long used for collecting meteorological data, now offered the opportunity of collecting highly specialized information and photographs. The first Skyhook balloon was launched on September 25, 1947. The balloon was developed by the Aeronautical Division of General Mills. It carried a 63-pound (29 kg) payload of nuclear emulsion to over 100,000 feet (30,000 m). At low level immediately after launch, the lifting gas (hydrogen or helium) in the balloons formed a small bubble at the top of the envelope, resulting in the balloon having a "limp" look. At the lower air pressure at higher altitudes, the gas expanded and eventually filled the whole envelope forming a sphere or ovoid. In some models the balloons could reach diameters of more than 100 feet (30 m).

In the succeeding 10 years, over 1,500 Skyhook flights were made for investigations supported by the ONR and for European scientists. These flights were made from locations in the United States, Canada, and naval vessels in the Atlantic, Pacific, Caribbean, and Arctic waters. Both Winzen Research and General Mills participated in these launchings, and in later years, the Atomic Energy Commission joined ONR in support of Project Skyhook.

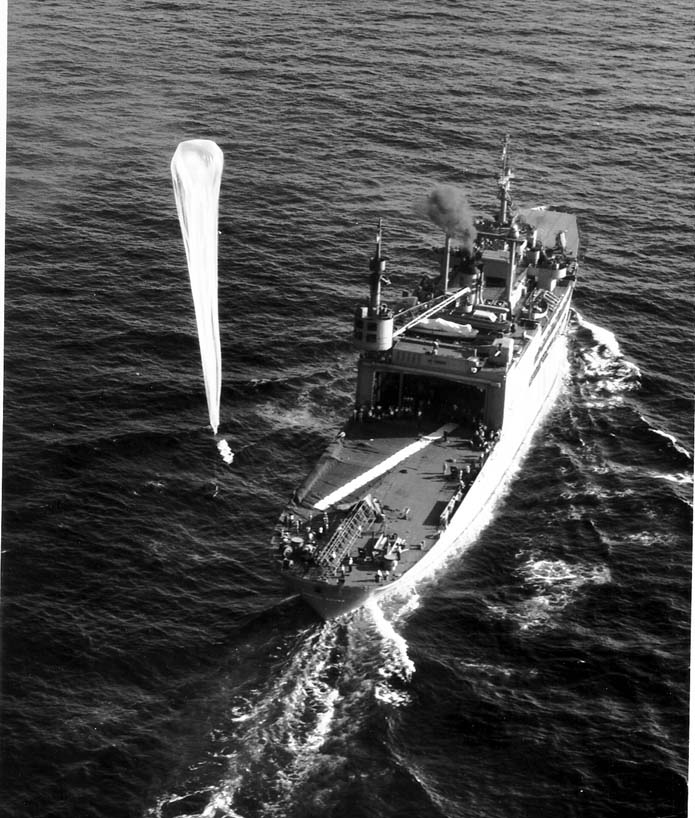
Skyhook balloon leaving the deck of the USS Norton Sound (AVM-1) on March 31, 1949.

Among significant flights, Project Skyhook launched the first successful three-balloon cluster in 1948. Then in 1949 the first shipboard Skyhook launch took place. It was followed by nearly 300 shipboard launchings over the next 10 years.

The first manned plastic balloon flight under ONR contract took place in 1949. Project Rockoon, in 1952, featured a Skyhook balloon that released small Deacon rockets at about 70,000 feet (21,000 m) above arctic waters.

One of the first known attempts to carry out an astrophysical measurement from a plastic balloon occurred under the Skyhook program on June 30, 1954. During the solar eclipse on that date two Skyhook balloons were launched by Winzen Research with camera gondolas employing simple orientating systems. The objective was to photograph the eclipse from high altitude. Varied photographic equipment was carried and aimed at the Sun to obtain full coverage for the total period of totality.

On September 7, 1956, the University of Minnesota launched a giant Mylar balloon (developed by the G. T. Schejeldahl Corporation of Northfield, MN) to set an unofficial balloon altitude record of 145,000 feet (44,000 m) for unmanned balloons. In 1957 the US Navy began an operational aerology system known as Transosonde (trans-ocean sounding), consisting of almost daily balloon flights across the Pacific Ocean from Japan.

== Project Stratoscope ==
On August 19, 1957, an unmanned Skyhook balloon lifted the first Project Stratoscope telescope. Project Stratoscope I was a program developed to research the Sun. Instruments included a 12-inch (30-centimeter) telescope with a special light-sensitive pointing system and a closed-circuit television camera that was guided by the scientists on the ground. This was the first balloon-borne telescope. The telescope took more than 400 photographs of sunspots. These were the sharpest photographs taken of the Sun up to that time. The photographs increased scientists' understanding of the motions observed in the strong magnetic fields of the sunspots.

== Project Churchy ==
In 1948, Skyhook balloons were used to show that in addition to protons and electrons, cosmic rays also include high energy atomic nuclei that are stripped of their electrons. Thirteen stratospheric plastic Skyhook balloons were launched in September 1953 as part of Project Churchy, an Office of Naval Research funded cosmic ray expedition at the geomagnetic equator. Project Churchy was conducted at the Galápagos because high-energy cosmic-ray particles can only be collected at the geomagnetic equator without accompanying low-energy particles found at higher latitudes. Balloons carrying scientific instruments rose to between 90,000 feet (27,000 m) and 105,000 feet (32,000 m) and encountered temperatures as low as −110 °F (−80 °C). Aircraft from Patrol Squadron (VP) 45 ‘Pelicans’ took off an hour after the launch of each balloon and visually tracked the balloon until it released its cargo and deflated. The instruments were observed until splashdown, and marked for destroyers to retrieve.

== Skyhook as UFO ==
Skyhook balloons may have been the origin of some UFO observations. The most famous case possibly involving a Skyhook mis-sighting was the Mantell UFO incident.

== See also ==
- Gas balloon
- Mantell UFO Incident
- Project Genetrix
- Project Moby Dick
- Project Mogul
- Project Strato-Lab

== Bibliography ==
- Freier, P., Lofgren, E. J., Ney, E. P. and Oppenheimer, H. L. 1948. Evidence for heavy nuclei in the primary cosmic radiation. Physical Review 74:213-17
- United States Centennial of Flight. Otto C. Winzen
- Childs, Captain Donald R. (22 April 1960). "High Altitude Balloon Research and Development Programs". United States Navy Medical Newsletter. 35 (8). U.S. Navy. Bureau of Medicine and Surgery: 28–35.
