= Project Manhigh =

1950s U.S. Air Force aero-medical research program

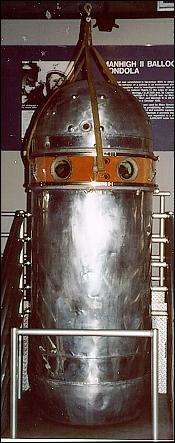
Manhigh II balloon gondola displayed at the National Museum of the U.S. Air Force, Wright-Patterson AFB, Ohio

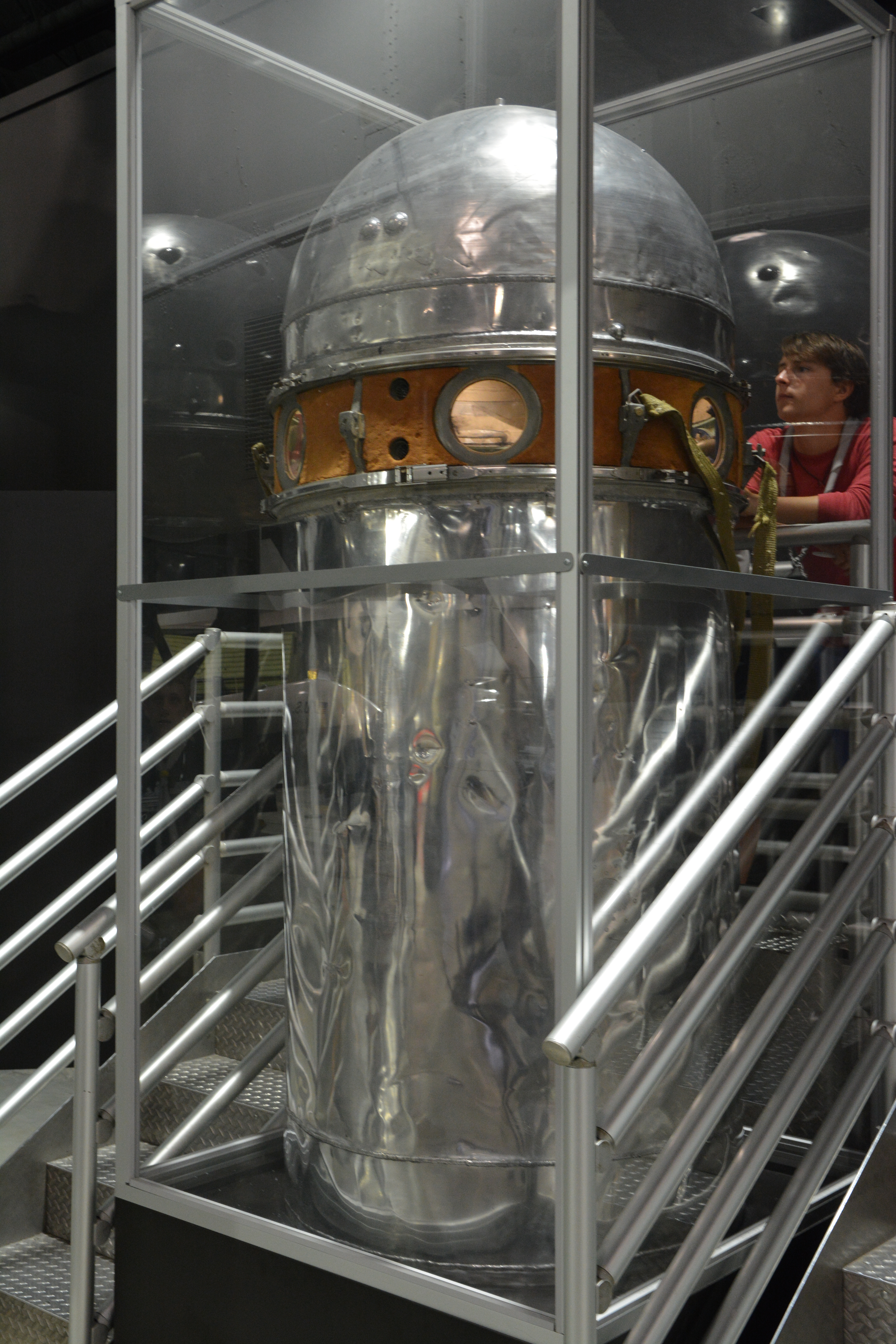
As displayed in 2018

Project Manhigh was a pre–Space Age military project that took men in balloons to the middle layers of the stratosphere, funded as an aero-medical research program, though seen by its designers as a stepping stone to space. It was conducted by the United States Air Force between 1955 and 1958.

== History ==
The project started in December 1955 to study the effects of cosmic rays on humans. Three balloon flights to the stratosphere were made during the program:

- Manhigh I to 29,500 m (96,800 ft), by Captain Joseph W. Kittinger on June 2, 1957. The balloon was launched from South St. Paul Airport and the flight was cut short due to one of the capsule's valves being installed backwards, which vented the oxygen supply outside, but not before reaching a record altitude of 96,784 feet.
- Manhigh II to 30,942 m (101,516 ft), by Major David G. Simons on August 19–20, 1957, launched from Portsmouth Mine in Crosby, Minnesota, for a 32-hour flight that included a set of 25 experiments and observations, and earned Simons a Life magazine cover spot. With the pilot and the scientific payload, the Manhigh II gondola had a total mass of 748 kg (1,649 lb). At maximum altitude, the balloon expanded to a diameter of 60 m (200 ft) with a volume of over 85,000 m^{3} (111,000 cu yd).
- Manhigh III to 29,900 m (98,100 ft), by Lieutenant Clifton M. McClure on October 8, 1958

Candidates for the Manhigh project were put through a series of physical and psychological tests that became the standard for qualifying astronauts for the Project Mercury, America's first crewed orbital space program.

Similar projects in which men in a gondola reached near-space altitudes were performed by Swiss physicist Auguste Piccard and Paul Kipfer, reaching 15,785 m (51,788 ft) in 1931, USSR-1 piloted by Georgy Prokofiev reaching 18,500 m (60,700 ft) in 1933, and Osoaviakhim-1 reaching 22,000 m (72,000 ft) in 1934 as well as Explorer II reaching 22,066 m (72,395 ft) in 1935.

== See also ==
- Flight altitude record
- Project Adam, a contemporary plan using Manhigh hardware by the United States Army
- Project Excelsior, follow-on flights in 1959 and 1960
- John Stapp
