= Edward P. Ney =

American physicist

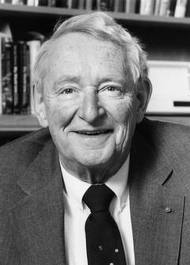
- Born: October 28, 1920; Minneapolis, Minnesota
- Died: July 9, 1996 (aged 75); Minneapolis, Minnesota
- Education: University of Virginia
- Scientific career
- Fields: Physics; Astronomy
- Workplaces: University of Minnesota; University of Virginia
- Doctoral advisor: Jesse Beams
- Doctoral students: Phyllis S. Freier; John D. Linsley; Frank B. McDonald

Edward Purdy Ney (October 28, 1920 – July 9, 1996) was an American physicist who made major contributions to cosmic ray research, atmospheric physics, heliophysics, and infrared astronomy. He was a discoverer of cosmic ray heavy nuclei and of solar proton events. He pioneered the use of high-altitude balloons for scientific investigations and helped to develop procedures and equipment that underlie modern scientific ballooning. He was one of the first researchers to put experiments aboard spacecraft.

In 1963, Ney became one of the first infrared astronomers. He founded O'Brien Observatory, where he and his colleagues discovered that certain stars are surrounded by grains of carbon and silicate minerals and established that these grains, from which planets are formed, are ubiquitous in circumstellar winds and regions of star formation.

== Early life ==
Ney's father, Otto Fred Ney and mother, Jessamine Purdy Ney, lived in Waukon, Iowa. However, in October 1920, his mother went to Minneapolis, Minnesota, where Ney was delivered by Caesarean section. After elementary school, he attended Waukon High School, where he developed an interest in science and mathematics that was encouraged by Coach Howard B. Moffitt, who taught several of his courses and later became an administrator at the University of Iowa.

== Career ==
In 1938, Ney began undergraduate studies at the University of Minnesota, where he became acquainted with Professor Alfred O. C. Nier, who was an expert in mass spectrometry. Soon, Nier recruited him to work in the spectroscopy laboratory for 35 cents per hour. In February 1940, Nier prepared a tiny but pure sample of Uranium-235, which he mailed to Columbia University, where John R. Dunning and his team proved that this isotope was responsible for nuclear fission, rather than the more abundant Uranium-238. This finding was a crucial step in the development of the atomic bomb. That summer, Ney and Robert Thompson prepared a larger sample of Uranium-235, which provided material for further important tests. Later, he helped Nier design and test mass spectrographs that were replicated for extensive use in the Manhattan Project.

=== Graduate studies in Virginia ===
In June 1942, after graduating with a B.S. degree in physics, Ney married June Felsing. They had four children: Judy, John, Arthur, and William. That year, Ney took his bride and two of Nier's mass spectrographs to Charlottesville, Virginia, where he began graduate studies with Jesse Beams at the University of Virginia. Ney brought experience and equipment that contributed significantly to Beams's wartime project to develop gas centrifuges for separation of uranium isotopes.

With Beams as his thesis advisor, Ney measured the self-diffusion coefficient of uranium hexafluoride. At the time, his results were classified, but in 1947, they were published in the Physical Review. In 1946, Ney received his Ph.D. in physics and became an assistant professor at the University of Virginia. With Beams and Leland Swoddy, he began an underground cosmic ray experiment in Endless Caverns near New Market, Virginia.

=== Return to Minnesota ===
John T. Tate was an influential professor of physics at the University of Minnesota, who was Nier's mentor and editor of the Physical Review. After the war, he recognized the research potential of large plastic balloons, which had been invented by Jean Piccard and were being manufactured at the General Mills Laboratories in the Como neighborhood of Minneapolis. Here, Otto C. Winzen used polyethylene to make balloons whose performance at high altitudes was better than the cellophane ones developed by Piccard. In 1947, because of Ney's interest in cosmic rays, Tate offered him a position as assistant professor, which was immediately accepted. Except for a sabbatical and two brief leaves of absence, Ney spent the rest of his life at Minnesota.

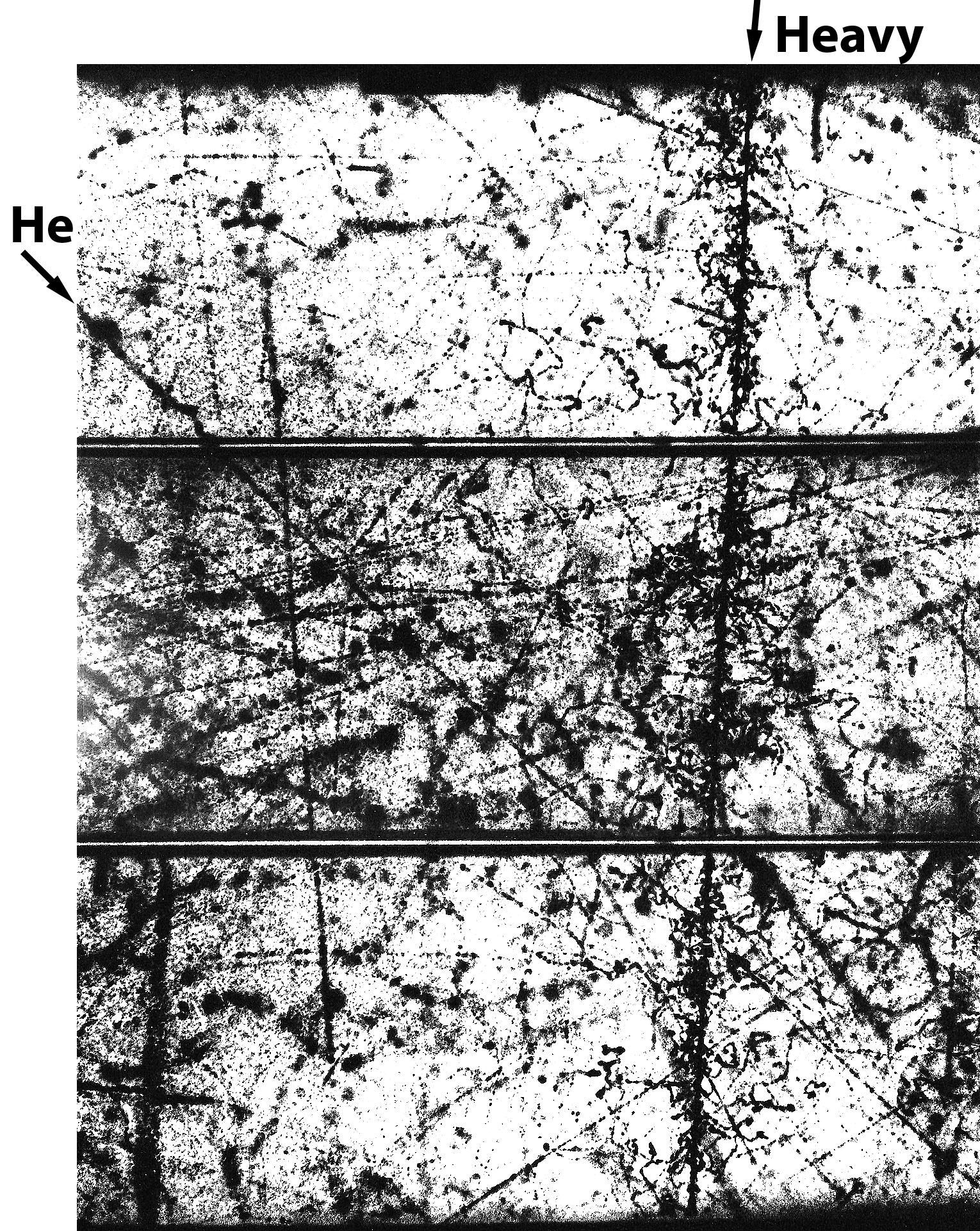
At center right, a primary cosmic ray heavy nucleus goes vertically through a cloud chamber, which was suspended under a balloon near the top of the atmosphere. At left, a Helium nucleus enters through the side of the chamber. Thin tracks are singly charged particles moving at nearly the speed of light. Note that this is a negative image, in which white droplets appear black, and that the horizontal bars are electrodes that do not introduce any material into the chamber. Photo provided by James A. Earl

=== Discovery of heavy cosmic ray nuclei ===
Back in Minneapolis, Ney met Frank Oppenheimer and Edward J. Lofgren, who had both arrived about a year earlier. In response to Tate's initiative, these three decided to use balloons to study primary cosmic rays at the top of the atmosphere. At first, they focused on developing cloud chambers small enough to fly on balloons, but soon realized that nuclear emulsions offer a more portable way to detect energetic particles. To take charge of emulsion work, they enlisted a graduate student, Phyllis S. Freier, as the fourth member of their group. Later, she became a renowned professor. In 1948, the Minnesota group collaborated with Bernard Peters and Helmut L. Bradt, of the University of Rochester, to launch a balloon flight carrying a cloud chamber and emulsions. This flight gave evidence for heavy nuclei among the cosmic rays. More specifically, the researchers discovered that, in addition to Hydrogen nuclei (protons), primary cosmic rays contain substantial numbers of fast moving nuclei of elements from helium to iron.

In ordinary matter, atoms of these elements consist of a nucleus surrounded by a cloud of electrons, but when the nuclei arrive as cosmic rays, they are devoid of electrons, because of collisions with atoms in interstellar matter. In both emulsions and cloud chambers, these "stripped" heavy nuclei leave an unmistakable track, which is much denser and "hairier" than that of protons, and whose characteristics make it possible to determine their atomic number. In further flights, the group showed that the abundances of elements in cosmic rays are similar to those found on Earth and in stars. These results had a major impact, for they showed that studies of cosmic radiation could play a significant role in astrophysics.

Shortly after these discoveries, Lofgren left for California to build the Bevatron. In 1949, Oppenheimer was forced to resign from the Minnesota faculty, because he had concealed his prewar membership in the Communist Party USA. That year, John R. Winckler joined Minnesota's cosmic ray group.

In 1950, with the aid of a cloud chamber that contained lead plates, Ney, together with Charles Critchfield and graduate student Sophie Oleksa, searched for primary cosmic ray electrons. They did not find them, but in 1960, James Earl, who joined the Minnesota group in 1958, used similar apparatus to discover a small primary electron component.

During the decade from 1950 to 1960, Ney's cosmic ray research shifted away from cloud chambers toward emulsions. However, his graduate students used counter controlled cloud chambers to make significant advances in electronic instrumentation for the detection and analysis of cosmic rays. Specifically, in 1954, John Linsley used a cloud chamber triggered by a cherenkov detector to study the charge distribution of heavy nuclei, and in 1955, Frank McDonald used one triggered by a scintillation counter for a similar purpose. Later, McDonald combined these two electronic detectors into a balloon instrument that served as a prototype for devices carried on many spacecraft.

=== Balloon technology ===
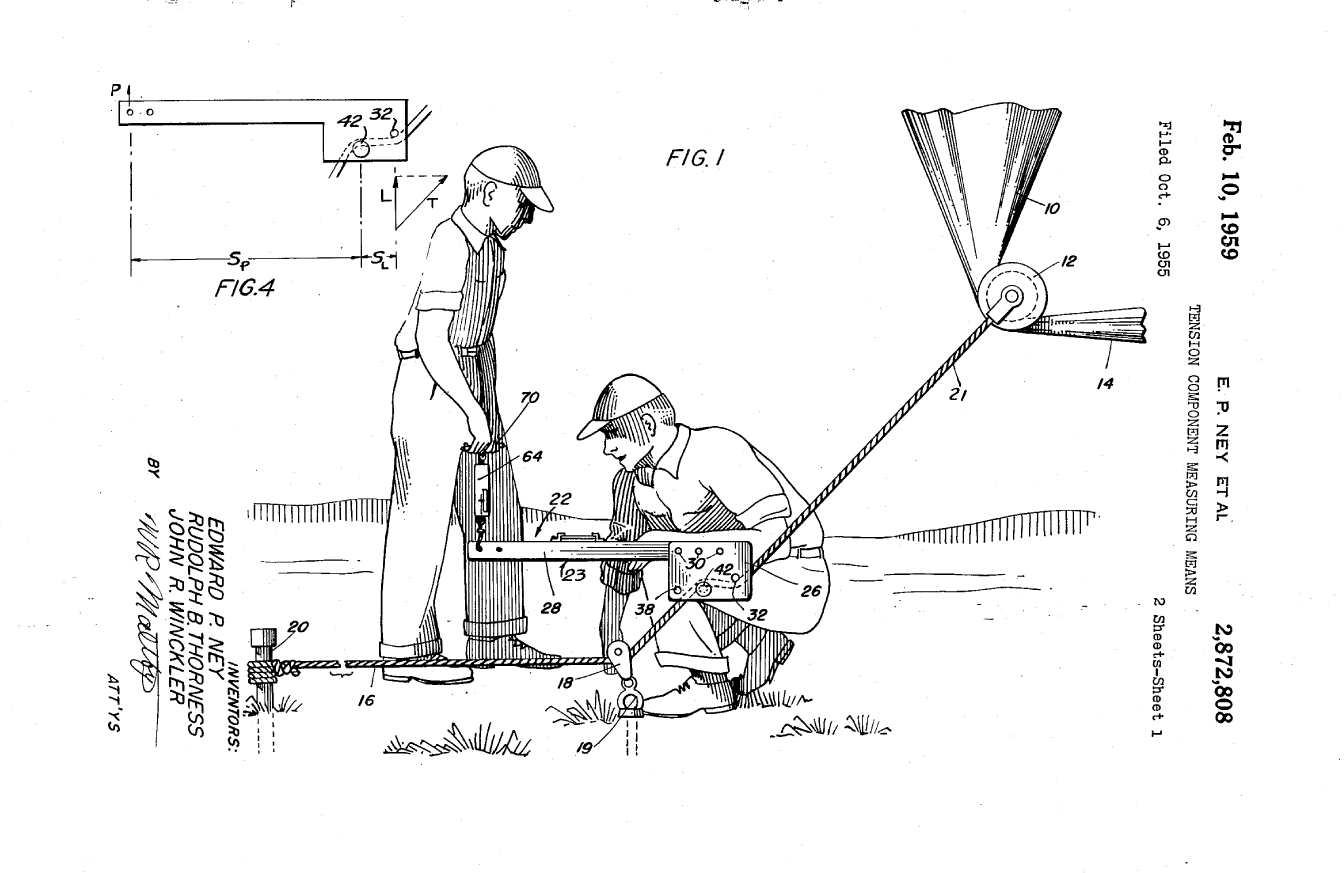
Figure 1. From a patent: Tension Component Measuring Means US Patent and Trademark Office

Although early plastic balloons performed spectacularly in a few cases, there were dangerous mishaps during launch and many unexplained failures in flight. Ney realized that this unreliability was due to inadequate engineering and a fundamental lack of understanding of balloon physics. In response, he collaborated with Critchfield and Winckler to carry out a project entitled "Research and Development in the Field of High Altitude Plastic Balloons", which was sponsored by the US Army, Navy, and Air Force under a contract with the Office of Naval Research, Nonr-710 (01), which was in force from December 1951 until August 1956.

During the Cold War, the United States sponsored several heavily funded and top secret attempts to carry out surveillance of the Soviet Union by means of balloon overflights. These included: Project Mogul, Project Moby Dick, and Project Genetrix. In July 1958, responding to the disappointing results of these efforts and to the deployment of the Lockheed U-2, President Eisenhower ordered an end to balloon surveillance. Because the secret programs made use of information from the Minnesota balloon project, it too was secret, but all its materials were declassified in 1958.

While the project was active, Ney and his coworkers carried out 313 major or experimental balloon flights, published 16 technical reports, and patented approximately 20 inventions. The final report lists 62 major innovations and achievements. The innovations include the duct appendix, the natural shape balloon, the Minnesota launch system, and the tetroon balloon design. The last achievement listed was the post-project flight of a mylar tetroon on September 7, 1956, which reached a maximum height of 145,000 feet (44,000 m) over Minneapolis. At the time, this was a record altitude for balloons, and there was considerable press coverage of the flight. Most of the project's balloons were launched at the University of Minnesota Airport in New Brighton, Minnesota. They were among more than 1000 flights launched here from 1948 until the airport was devastated by a tornado on May 6, 1965.

Key personnel of the project were: Raymond W. Maas and William F. Huch, who provided engineering expertise, Rudolph B. Thorness, who was in charge of the physics machine shop, Robert L. Howard, who ran the electronics shop, and Leland S. Bohl, who worked on the project while earning his Ph.D. under Ney. Many of their names appear as authors not only of patents and technical reports, but also of scientific publications.

In spite of its secrecy, many of the project's balloons carried instruments for open scientific research. For example, from January 20, 1953, until February 4, 1953, with Winzen Research, Inc, the project launched 13 flights at Pyote Air Force Base in Texas. Several of these carried packages for cosmic ray research, one of which was designated as "ballast". These were Skyhook flights, which is the generic term used by the Office of Naval Research to designate balloon flights whose primary objectives were scientific, rather than military. Some milestones of more than 1500 Skyhook flights are: the first Skyhook launch (1947), the first shipboard launch (1949), the Rockoon program (1952), the tetroon record flight of September 1956, Stratoscope (1957 - 1971), and Skyhook Churchill (1959 - 1976).

In 1960, the National Center for Atmospheric Research was established. On October 17, 1961, its panel on scientific balloons met to select a permanent launch site for balloon operations. Members of this panel, whose chairman was Verner E. Suomi, were Ney, Charles B. Moore, Alvin Howell, James K. Angell, J. Allen Hynek, and Martin Schwarzschild, who was the prime mover behind Stratoscope. They chose Palestine, Texas, where the National Scientific Balloon Facility (NSBF) was created in 1962. Since then, thousands of balloons have been launched there, and it has served as the base for flight expeditions all over the world.

The Minnesota balloon project pioneered procedures and equipment used in Skyhook, NSBF, and the crewed flights of Projects Stratolab and Manhigh. These include launch methods, design of reliable balloons, knowledge of atmospheric structure, and reliable instrumentation for flight control and tracking.

=== Atmospheric physics ===
During the balloon project, winds and temperatures in the atmosphere were prime subjects for investigation, for they have a critical impact on balloon performance. To map out upper-level winds, Professor Homer T. Mantis used "down cameras", which photographed features on the ground. Ney was interested in studying variations of air temperature with altitude. To measure them, he put thermistors and wire thermometers on many flights. With the aid of standard radiosonde equipment, Ney's student, John L. Gergen, carried out 380 radiation temperature soundings in parallel with the balloon project. With Leland Bohl, and Suomi, he invented and patented the "black ball", which is an instrument that responds not to air temperature, but to thermal radiation in the atmosphere.

After 1956, the Office of Naval Research continued to support, under Nonr-710 (22), Minnesota's research in atmospheric physics. While this grant was in force, and earlier during the balloon project, Ney's students made major contributions, which he summarized as follows:

John Kroening studied atmospheric small ions, invented a chemiluminescent ozone detector, and did a seminal study of atmospheric ozone. John Gergen designed the "black ball" and studied atmospheric radiation balance, culminating in a national series of radiation soundings in which a majority of the weather bureau stations took part. Jim Rosen studied aerosols with an optical coincidence counter, which was so good it still has not been improved; he was the first to discover thin laminar layers of dust in the stratosphere and to identify the source as volcanic eruptions. Ted Pepin participated in photographic observations from balloon platforms, and has subsequently carried this interest further with optical observations of the Earth's limb from satellites.

=== Solar energetic particles and the IGY ===
The International Geophysical Year (IGY) was an international scientific initiative that lasted from July 1, 1957, to December 31, 1958. Because its agenda included studies of cosmic rays, Ney served on the IGY's US National Committee - Technical Panel on Cosmic Rays. Other members of the panel were: Scott E. Forbush (chairman), Serge A. Korff, H. Victor Neher, J. A. Simpson, S. F. Singer and J. A. Van Allen. With Winckler and Freier, Ney proposed to keep balloons aloft (nearly) continuously to monitor the intensity of cosmic rays during the period of maximum solar activity that coincided with the IGY. When this ambitious proposal was funded, Freier and Ney took responsibility for emulsion packs that went on every flight, and Winckler designed a payload that combined an ionization chamber with a geiger counter.

On the first day of the IGY, this scheme paid off, when Winckler and his students, Laurence E. Peterson, Roger Arnoldy and Robert Hoffman, observed X rays whose intensity followed temporal variations of an aurora over Minneapolis. A few weeks later, Winckler and Peterson observed a brief burst of gamma rays from a Solar Flare.

During the balloon project, Ney's research on cosmic rays became less intense, but he continued to work with Freier and guided student work in the field. He became more active, in anticipation of IGY, when Peter Fowler came to Minnesota in 1956/57. Fowler, Freier and Ney measured the intensity of Helium nuclei as a function of energy. They found that, at high energies, the intensity exhibited a steep decrease with increasing energy, but at lower energies, it peaked and then decreased at even lower energies. Because the peak intensity varied within the solar cycle, these measurements were an early observation of the solar modulation of low-energy galactic cosmic rays.

After Fowler had returned to Bristol, Freier, Ney and Winckler observed a very high intensity of particles on March 26, 1958, which examination of the emulsions proved were mostly low-energy protons, and which were associated with a solar flare. This was surprising, because the Earth's magnetic field would normally have prevented these particles from reaching Minnesota. Consequently, the team concluded that a geomagnetic storm, which was underway during the event, had distorted the field enough to admit protons. Later, these influxes of solar energetic particles, whose discovery was an important achievement of IGY, became designated as solar proton events. Along with geomagnetic storms, they are important phenomena of space weather, and their intensive study continues in an effort to understand the propagation of charged particles in interplanetary space.

After the IGY ended, Ney's interest in cosmic rays began to diminish, but in 1959, he wrote an often cited paper Cosmic Rays and the Weather, in which "he was probably the first person to discuss climatological effects of cosmic rays".

=== Dim Light ===
In 1959, Ney and his colleague Paul J. Kellogg developed a theory of the solar corona based on the idea that some of its light is synchrotron radiation emitted by energetic electrons spiraling in solar magnetic fields. This theory predicted that the polarization of coronal light would exhibit a component perpendicular to that arising from Thomson scattering of sunlight, which had been widely considered to be the source of coronal luminosity. To test this theory, Ney developed an "eclipse polarimeter", to measure the intensity and direction of coronal polarization during a total solar eclipse. Ney and his colleagues decided to perform these measurements during the eclipse of October 2, 1959, which was visible from North Africa, where there was only a small chance that clouds over the Sahara would spoil the observations. In July, Ney went to French West Africa to set up logistical support for an expedition. Here, a military truck, in which he was scouting locations to view the eclipse, overturned, and Ney suffered seven broken ribs, a broken collarbone and a broken leg. By October, Ney had recovered enough to return to Africa, where he and his colleagues deployed three polarimeters along the track of the total eclipse. One of these was clouded over, but the other two returned good data. The results disproved the theory of Kellogg and Ney.

To confirm and extend these observations, Ney organized an expedition to The Forks, Maine and Senneterre, Quebec, where he set up two polarimeters to measure the corona during the eclipse of July 20, 1963. In coordination with these measurements, two balloons were launched into the path of totality with cameras to record the zodiacal light. Zodiacal cameras were also launched in Australia by V. D. Hopper and J. G. Sparrow, and astronaut Scott Carpenter took photographs of the corona from an aircraft at 40,000 feet over Canada.

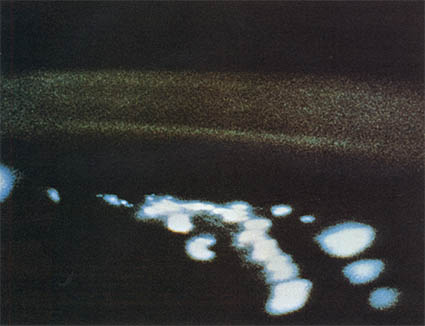
Airglow and lightning over Australia; Photographed from Faith 7 by Gordon Cooper

Ney's studies of the corona piqued his curiosity about other sources of dim light within the Solar System. Consequently, Ney and Huch developed reliable cameras whose low F-number enhanced their ability to record dim light, but sacrificed picture sharpness. This compromise proved to be appropriate for the dim and diffuse zodiacal light and airglow. On May 15, 1963, aboard Faith 7, one of Ney's cameras was operated in space by Mercury astronaut Gordon Cooper. According to Ney's student John E. Naugle, NASA's Associate Administrator for Space Science and Applications, one of its images was: ".... the first photograph of the night airglow taken from above." NASA designated Ney's experiment as "S-1", which means that it was the first scientific experiment conducted on a crewed space flight. Later, aboard Geminis, 5, 9, 10, and 11, astronauts photographed the Zodiacal Light and the gegenschein, which had been obscured in the Mercury missions by nightglow.

Ney followed up his zodiacal experiments on crewed space missions by putting instruments aboard the Orbiting Solar Observatory (OSO). The observations showed that zodiacal light is highly polarized, and that its intensity and polarization are nearly constant in time. The OSO instruments also recorded terrestrial lightning and demonstrated the remarkable fact that there are ten times as many flashes over the land as over the ocean. This difference remains unexplained.

=== Infrared astronomy ===
In 1963, Ney went to Australia on sabbatical leave, where he helped Robert Hanbury Brown and Richard Q. Twiss to construct the Narrabri Stellar Intensity Interferometer. When he returned, Ney left behind a working instrument, but with the advice of Fred Hoyle, who he met in Australia, had decided to focus his attention on a field of broader scope: infrared astronomy. His students, Wayne Stein and Fred Gillett, who had participated in the eclipse expeditions, were eager to work in this area. At this time, there were only two infrared astronomers: Frank J. Low, at the University of Arizona, and Gerry Neugebauer at the California Institute of Technology. To learn more, Ney and his technician, Jim Stoddart, went to Arizona's Lunar and Planetary Laboratory, where Low, who Ney dubbed "The Pope of infrared astronomy", familiarized them with his newly developed low temperature bolometers. After Stein completed his Ph.D. in 1964, he went to Princeton University to help Professor Robert E. Danielson, an earlier Ney student, carry out infrared observations on Stratoscope II. Similarly, Larry Peterson convinced Gillett to begin a program in infrared astronomy at the University of California, San Diego (UCSD). Soon, Stein joined Gillett at UCSD.

Until Ney began his infrared studies, astronomical research at Minnesota had been carried out mainly by Willem Luyten, who was an expert on white dwarf stars and is credited with coining this name in 1922. When Luyten retired in 1967, he was replaced by Nick Woolf, who had been involved with Stratoscope II, and whom Ney had recruited from the University of Texas. With this addition, the department's research emphasis shifted decisively to infrared astronomy, and Minnesota became a significant presence in this nascent field.

=== O'Brien Observatory ===
Infrared astronomy began in Minnesota under a severe competitive disadvantage: the lack of a nearby observatory. Because infrared radiation is primarily absorbed by atmospheric water vapor, infrared observatories were typically on mountain tops, above which there is minimal water. From his knowledge of atmospheric physics, Ney realized that, during its cold winters, the air above Minnesota was as free of water as that above a high mountain. Armed with this insight, he approached Nancy Boggess, who had just taken responsibility for NASA's infrared astronomy programs, and who quickly authorized funding for a Minnesota observatory. Ney persuaded Thomond "Tomy" O'Brien to donate a site on the hills above Marine on St. Croix, Minnesota, which is about 22 miles northeast of Minneapolis. Another 180-acre parcel from the extensive holdings of Thomond's grandfather formed the nucleus of William O'Brien State Park, two miles upriver from Marine.

The 30-inch Cassegrain reflector, with which Ney fitted out O'Brien Observatory, saw first light in August 1967. That winter, it was put to use by Ney and Stein. The next winter, Woolf and Ney discovered that infrared radiation from certain cool stars exhibits a spectral feature which indicates that they are surrounded by grains of carbon and silicate minerals. Within two years, further work by the Minnesota/UCSD group established that these grains, from which planets are formed, are ubiquitous in circumstellar winds and regions of star formation. At O'Brien, Ney and his Australian colleague, David Allen, carried out imaging studies of the lunar surface which revealed temperature anomalies. To explain them, Allen and Ney suggested that large rocks in contact with deep subsurface layers cooled more slowly than the loosely packed regolith.

=== Mount Lemmon observing facility ===
Despite the success of the O'Brien Observatory, the Minnesota/UCSD group realized that they needed regular access to a large infrared telescope located at a high altitude site. Consequently, Stein, Gillett, Woolf and Ney proposed to construct a 60-inch infrared telescope. They obtained funding from their two universities, the National Science Foundation, and from Fred Hoyle, who offered a contribution with the understanding that aspiring British infrared astronomers would be trained at Minnesota. After Woolf's student, Robert Gehrz, completed a search for suitable sites, the group decided on Mount Lemmon, whose proximity to a source of liquid helium at the University of Arizona greatly simplified the logistics. The observatory was named the Mount Lemmon Observing Facility (MLOF). It achieved first light in December 1970.

=== Teaching ===
Ney loved to teach. In 1961 he gave the Minnesota department's first honors course in modern physics. He wrote up his lectures as Ney's Notes on Relativity, which were published as the book Electromagnetism and Relativity. In 1964, Ney received Minnesota's outstanding teaching award.

=== Retirement ===
In 1982, Ney had a serious heart attack. It was followed by open heart surgery on November 28 of that year, which left him with ventricular tachycardia for the rest of his life. Taking an active role in the treatment of this condition, Ney applied his knowledge of physics to the study of cardiology and of his heart's electrical system.

This illness slowed Ney down for a few years, but he eventually began to study the effect of radon gas in the atmosphere. He thought that the ionization from radon, which comes from radioactive decay of uranium and thorium in rocks, might account for the high frequency of lightning over land, which had been demonstrated on OSO. This research continued after his retirement in 1990, but did not reach a conclusion before he died on July 9, 1996.

== Impact and legacy ==
Frank Low summarized Ney's career:

Ed Ney at Minnesota had a strong belief that being at the scientific forefront meant doing new and difficult things that few others were doing and doing them better. He also felt that to be the best at what you do and the master of your future, you had to be able to learn how to create and advance all of the technology in your own house rather than collaborating too closely with outsiders. Ed's eclectic interests led him in a natural progression from the Manhattan Project, to measurements of cosmic rays, to studies of the physics of balloon flight, to atmospheric and solar physics, to research on the solar corona and the zodiacal light, and finally into the world of astronomy.

=== Doctoral students ===
A less visible impact is that made by Ney's students after they finished their PhDs. In 1959, John Naugle joined Goddard Space Flight Center, and in 1960, took charge of the National Aeronautical and Space Administration's particles and fields research program. Later, he became associate administrator for NASA's Office of Space Science, and from 1977 until 1981, served as NASA Chief Scientist. Similarly, Frank McDonald joined Goddard in 1959 as head of the Energetic Particles Branch in the Space Science Division, where he was project scientist on nine satellite programs. In 1982 he became NASA Chief Scientist, serving until 1987, when he returned to Goddard as associate director/chief scientist.

At Princeton Bob Danielson played a key role in the Stratoscope project, where he was a pioneer of infrared astronomy. James M. Rosen became a professor at the University of Wyoming Department of Physics and Astronomy, where he studied atmospheric dust and aerosols. He was also instrumental in the founding of the Wyoming Infrared Observatory, which was built by Robert Gherz and John Hackwell, another Ney student.

In 1973, Fred Gillett moved from UCSD to Kitt Peak National Observatory where he helped to develop the Infrared Astronomical Satellite. His investigations on this mission revealed the "Vega phenomenon", which refers to dust in orbit around certain young stars. This discovery provided the first solid evidence that planet formation occurs throughout the galaxy. From 1987 to 1989, he was a visiting senior scientist at NASA headquarters, where he played a major role in defining the future of infrared astronomy. More specifically, he made major technical and programmatic contributions to the Space Infrared Telescope, which was renamed the Spitzer Space Telescope after its launch in 2003, the Stratospheric Observatory for Infrared Astronomy, which consists of a large infrared telescope aboard an airplane, and 2MASS, which is an infrared all-sky survey. After this administrative interlude, he went to the Gemini Observatory, where he became project scientist. After Gillett's untimely death on April 22, 2001, the telescope on Mauna Kea, Hawaii, was officially named the Fredrick C. Gillett Gemini Telescope.

=== Honors and awards ===
- 1964 University of Minnesota, Outstanding Teaching Award
- 1969 NASA Apollo Achievement Award
- 1971 National Academy of Sciences
- 1974 University of Minnesota, Regent's Professorship
- 1975 NASA Exceptional Scientific Achievement Medal
- 1979 American Academy of Arts and Sciences
- 1992 University of Minnesota, Outstanding Achievement Award

=== Advisory committee memberships ===
- 1955 US Air Force, study group on biological aspects of cosmic radiation
- 1959 United States National Research Council, subcommittee on nuclear emulsions
- 1960 - 1961 NASA, planetary and interplanetary subcommittee
- 1975 National Science Foundation, visiting committee, astronomy section
- 1976 - 1978 Science magazine, editorial board
- 1976 - 1979 American Astronomical Society, council
- 1979 - 1982 NRC, space sciences board
- 1982 - 1985 University of Minnesota, university senate

== Selected remarks by Ney ==
I knew I couldn't compete with Al Nier.

Whatever you don't test will come back to haunt you.

It was fun to get to know the astronauts, but a hard way to do science.

I went to Australia to get my merit badge in astronomy.

Commenting on the discovery of carbon and silicate grains around aging stars:

In a cosmology dominated by Hydrogen and Helium, it was a relief to find a source of the material that forms the terrestrial planets.

On January 19, 1953, replying to an invitation to attend the Bagnères-de-Bigorre cosmic ray conference from Louis Leprince-Ringuet, whom he addressed as "petit Prince", Ney wrote:

I would like very much to attend the conference in the Pyrenees in July. It would be very good if I could locate some little French girl to teach me the language before I come over. I am looking forward to seeing your "charming" scanners.

== Remarks about Ney ==
The principal at Waukon High School said:

Nobody who ever graduated from this school has ever done anything in science, and neither will you.
