= Fred Gillett (astronomer) =

American astronomer (1937–2001)

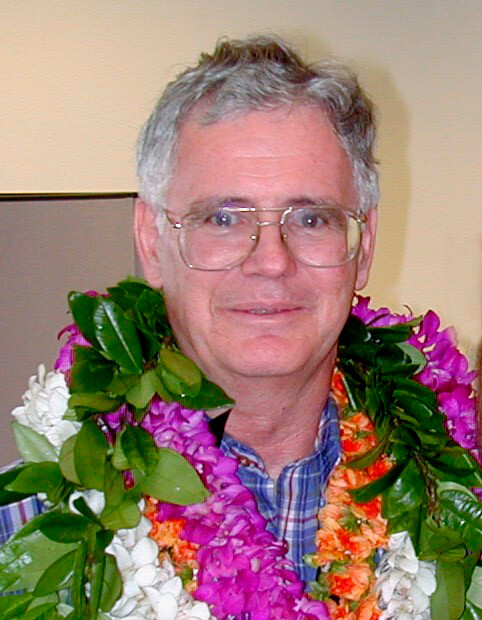
- Gillett in June 1999
- Born: Frederick Carl Gillett; February 7, 1937; Minot, North Dakota, U.S.
- Died: April 22, 2001 (aged 64); Seattle, Washington, U.S.
- Education: University of Minnesota (B.S., Ph.D.)
- Spouse: Marian Ruth DeGriselle (m. 1960)
- Awards: NASA Exceptional Scientific Achievement Medal (1984)
- Scientific career
- Fields: Astronomy
- Workplaces: University of California, San Diego; Kitt Peak National Observatory; Gemini Observatory
- Thesis: Zodiacal Light and Interplanetary Dust (1966)
- Doctoral advisor: Edward P. Ney

Frederick Carl Gillett (February 7, 1937 – April 22, 2001) was an American astronomer who was a pioneer of infrared astronomy. He was based successively at the University of California, San Diego, Kitt Peak National Observatory, and the International Gemini Observatory. His discoveries include the Vega phenomenon and the first unidentified infrared emission bands.

== Biography ==
Gillett was born on February 7, 1937, in Minot, North Dakota. He studied at the University of Minnesota, receiving a bachelor of science in physics in 1960. In 1960 he also married Marian Ruth DeGriselles, a registered nurse. As a graduate student at the university he took an interest in the new field of infrared astronomy, under the guidance of his doctoral advisor Edward P. Ney. Gillett travelled to Tucson, Arizona to use Frank Low's new infrared detector, a bolometer. With Low, he designed and built the first spectrometer that could measure infrared radiation with wavelengths of 8–14μm. As part of his thesis Gillett used an infrared photometer attached to a high-altitude balloon to observe the zodiacal cloud. He was awarded a Ph.D. in physics in 1966, one of the first doctorates awarded for infrared astronomy.

After graduating he worked at the University of California, San Diego for seven years. In 1973, with his university colleagues William Forrest and Kenneth Merrill, he identified an unexpected infrared emission feature with a wavelength of 11.3μm from the planetary nebulae NGC 7027 and HD 184738. This was the first discovered example of the now widely observed phenomenon known as unidentified infrared emission (UIE) bands. The exact causes of these emissions remain unidentified.

In 1973 he moved to Kitt Peak National Observatory (KPNO) in Arizona where he introduced infrared instrumentation to the observatory.

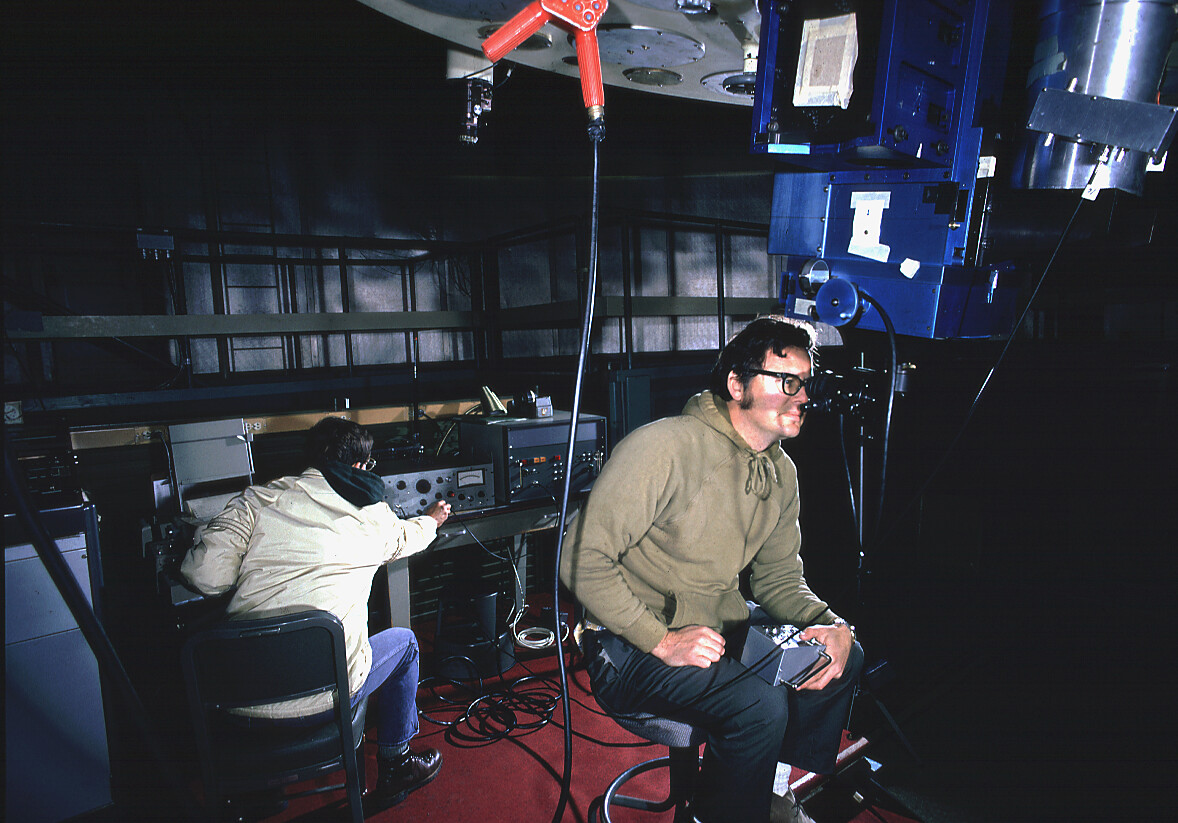
Gillet using the 2.1m telescope at Kitt Peak National Observatory in the mid-1970s

In 1975 he was part of the team selected by NASA that developed the Infrared Astronomical Satellite (IRAS). The project helped open up access to military infrared detector technology that had until then been classified.

For the 10-month duration of the IRAS mission in 1983 Gillett, Marion, and Gillett's colleague George Aumann relocated to the Rutherford Laboratory in Oxfordshire, England. Using IRAS, Gillett and Aumann identified an unexpected excess of infrared emissions from one of the IRAS mission's standard stars, Vega (Alpha Lyrae). They concluded the emissions were caused by circumstellar dust particles over 1.2 mm (0.05 in) in diameter orbiting Vega at a distance of roughly 85 AU (1.3×10^{10} km) and at a temperature of about 85 K (−188.2 °C). The Vega phenomenon, as it became known, provided the first solid evidence that planet formation occurs outside of the Solar System.

In 1984 he was awarded the NASA Exceptional Scientific Achievement Medal "for outstanding contributions to IRAS".

In 1987 Gillett took a two-year sabbatical to be a visiting senior scientist in the Office of Space Science at NASA's headquarters in Washington, D.C. He contributed to the development of several infrared telescope projects, including SIRTF, later renamed the Spitzer Space Telescope; the Stratospheric Observatory for Infrared Astronomy (SOFIA), a 2.5 m (8.2 ft) reflector telescope mounted inside a Boeing 747SP; and 2MASS, an astronomical survey of the whole sky.

The Frederick C. Gillett Gemini Telescope in 2022

In 1994 Gillett was appointed the project scientist for the development of the International Gemini Observatory, a pair of 8.1 m (27 ft) optical/infrared telescopes on Mauna Kea in Hawai'i and Cerro Pachón in Chile that saw first light in 1999 and 2000 respectively. In August 1999 Gillett was diagnosed with myelodysplastic syndrome. He died on April 22, 2001, aged 64, at the University of Washington Medical Center in Seattle, Washington following a stem-cell transplant. He was survived by his wife, three children, and his mother.

In 2002 the Gemini North Telescope on Mauna Kea, Hawai'i was officially named The Frederick C. Gillett Gemini Telescope. The 4.6 km (2.9 mi) wide main belt asteroid 74509 Gillett is named in his honor.
