= Charles Critchfield =

American mathematical physicist (1910–1994)

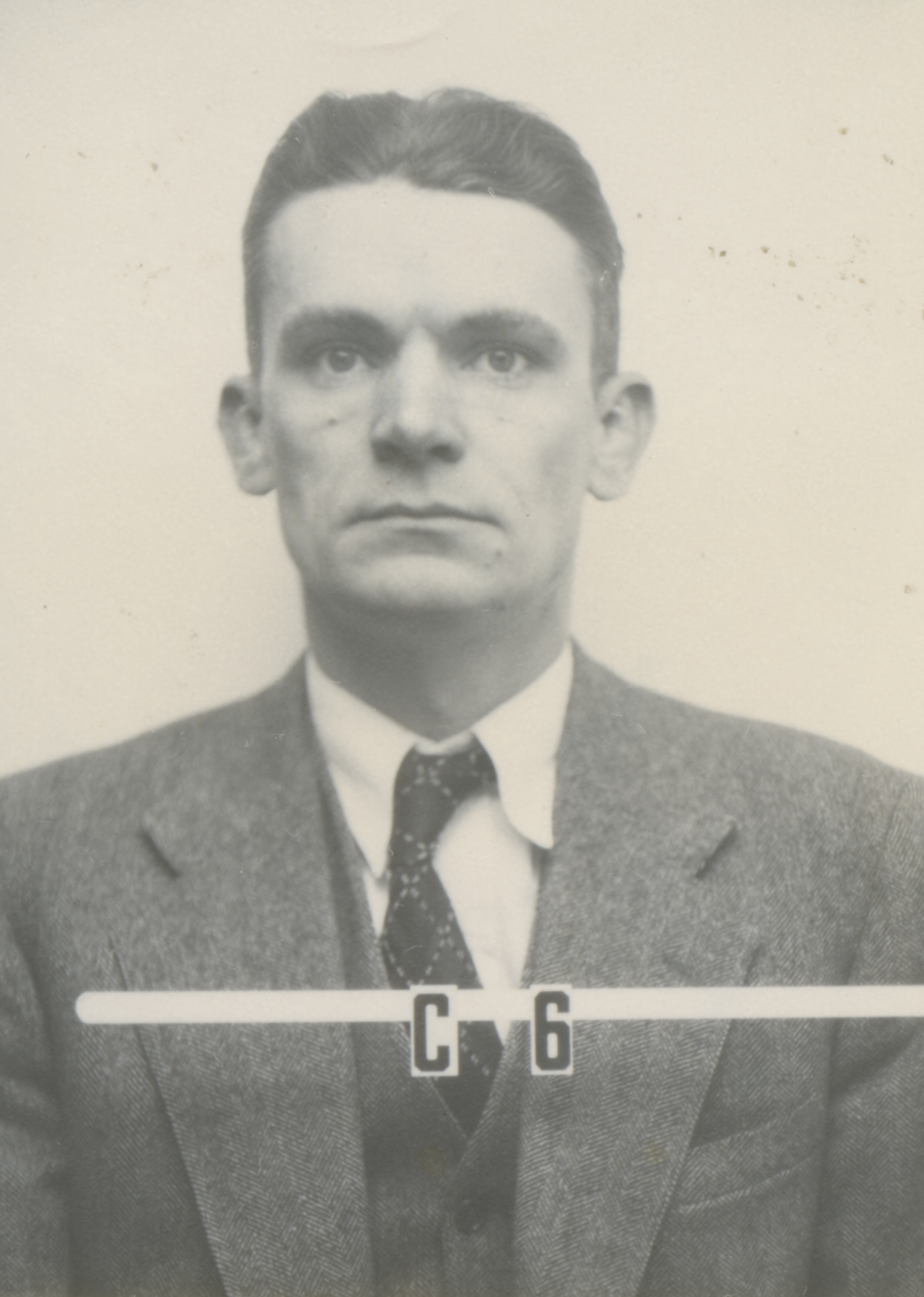
- Critchfield's Los Alamos ID badge photo
- Born: June 7, 1910; Shreve, Ohio, US
- Died: February 12, 1994 (aged 83); Los Alamos, New Mexico, US
- Education: George Washington University (BS, MS, PhD)
- Known for: Nuclear weapons Manhattan Project; Balloon technology
- Scientific career
- Fields: Mathematical Physics
- Workplaces: Institute for Advanced Study; Harvard University; Carnegie Institution; Los Alamos National Laboratory; University of Minnesota
- Doctoral advisor: Edward Teller

Charles Louis Critchfield (June 7, 1910 – February 12, 1994) was an American mathematical physicist. A graduate of George Washington University, where he earned his PhD in physics under the direction of Edward Teller in 1939, he conducted research in ballistics at the Institute for Advanced Study in Princeton and the Ballistic Research Laboratory at the Aberdeen Proving Ground, and received three patents for improved sabot designs.

In 1943, Teller and Robert Oppenheimer persuaded Critchfield to come to the Manhattan Project's Los Alamos National Laboratory, where he joined the Ordnance Division under Captain William Parsons on the gun-type fission weapons, Little Boy and Thin Man. After it was discovered that the Thin Man design would not work, he was transferred to Robert Bacher's Gadget Division as the leader of the Initiator group, which was responsible for the design and testing of the "Urchin" neutron initiator that provided the burst of neutrons that kick-started the nuclear detonation of the Fat Man weapon.

After the war he became a professor at the University of Minnesota, and then vice president for research at the Convair division of General Dynamics, where he worked on the Atlas family of rockets. In 1961, J. Carson Mark and Norris Bradbury offered him a position at Los Alamos, which he held until he retired in 1977.

== Early life ==
Charles Louis Critchfield was born in Shreve, Ohio, on June 7, 1910, and grew up in Washington, D.C. He received his B.S. (1934) and M.A. (1936) degrees in mathematics from George Washington University, where he also earned a PhD in Physics (1939) under the direction of Edward Teller.

During Critchfield's graduate studies, Teller's colleague George Gamow introduced him to Hans Bethe, with whom he wrote a paper in 1938, which analyzed the nuclear fusion of protons into deuterons. The next year, Bethe showed that this process is a key link in the proton-proton chain reaction and the CNO cycle, which are the major ways that nuclear energy is released in the solar core and in massive stars. In 1967, Bethe was awarded the Nobel Prize for this work on stellar nucleosynthesis.

== World War II ==
After he graduated, Critchfield taught optics for a year at the University of Rochester at the invitation of Victor Weisskopf. In 1940, he was awarded a National Research Council fellowship, and went to work under Eugene Wigner at the Institute for Advanced Study in Princeton. At this time, Robert Kent had just recruited John von Neumann to the advisory board of the Ballistic Research Laboratory at the Aberdeen Proving Ground. Critchfield joined von Neumann and Wigner there on several visits.

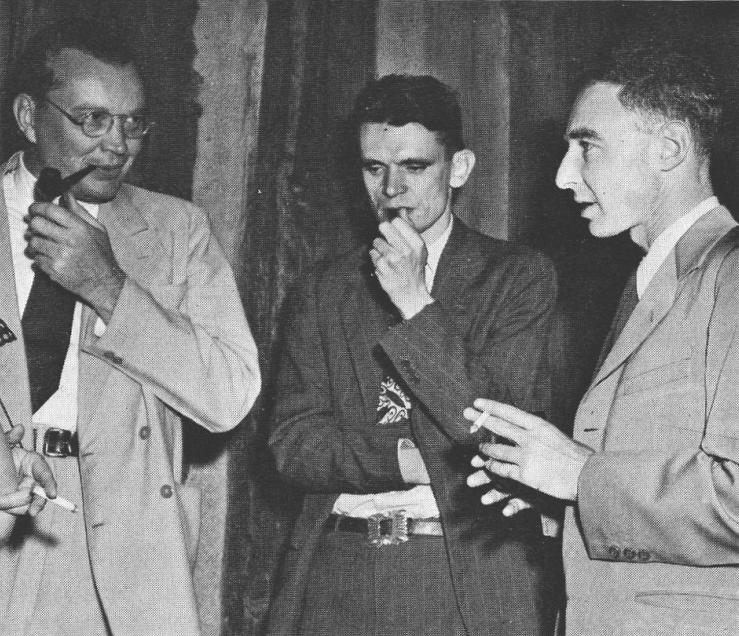
Eric Jette, Charles Critchfield, and Robert Oppenheimer at Los Alamos

In 1942, after a brief stay at Harvard University, Critchfield went to the Carnegie Institution of Washington, where he continued his ballistic studies, which resulted in three patents for improved sabot designs. Because of his experience with ballistics, Teller and Robert Oppenheimer persuaded Critchfield to come to the Manhattan Project's Los Alamos National Laboratory in 1943, where he joined the Ordnance Division under Captain William Parsons. As leader of the target, projectile, and source group, he worked on the gun-type fission weapons, Little Boy and Thin Man.

In April 1944, the Manhattan Project experienced a crisis when Emilio Segrè discovered that plutonium made in nuclear reactors would not work in Thin Man. In response, Oppenheimer completely reorganized the laboratory to focus on development of an implosion-type nuclear weapon in August. He reassigned Critchfield to a new Gadget Division under Robert Bacher, as the leader of the Initiator group. This group was responsible for the design and testing of the "Urchin" neutron initiator, which provided a burst of neutrons that kick-started the nuclear detonation of the Fat Man weapon.

== Postwar ==
Critchfield left Los Alamos in 1946 and returned to George Washington University, but soon left to join Wigner at the Oak Ridge National Laboratory. In 1947 he became an assistant professor at the University of Minnesota, where he participated, with Edward P. Ney and John R. Winckler, in a classified project to improve balloon technology. Here, with Leland S. Bohl, he invented and patented the natural shape balloon, and participated, with Ney and his student Sophie Oleksa, in an early search for primary cosmic ray electrons.

In 1955, after advancing to full professor at Minnesota, Critchfield became vice president for research at the Convair division of General Dynamics. Here, he worked on the Atlas family of rockets, which began as a series of ICBMs and evolved into launch vehicles for Project Mercury and many other space missions. He also created the Convair Scientific Research Laboratory whose staff were expected to serve as consultants for the company's engineering divisions and to carry out basic scientific research. In 1957, Critchfield's student William C. Erickson joined the staff, and created the Clark Lake Radio Observatory. In 1963, this facility, where observations focused on long wavelength radio waves, was transferred to the University of Maryland, where Erickson had become a professor. Although the original observatory has been abandoned, similar research continues at the much larger Long Wavelength Array in central New Mexico.

== Later life ==
In early November 1959, President Dwight D. Eisenhower's Secretary of Defense Neil H. McElroy selected Critchfield to be head of the Defense Advanced Research Projects Agency. McElroy hoped that Critchfield would be able to fix the nation's troubled missile program, but Critchfield was reluctant to serve at the director's $19,000 salary. McElroy then offered to let Critchfield serve without pay, with the government paying only his expenses of $15 per day, while allowing Critchfield to continue to draw his Convair salary of around $40,000. Critchfield accepted this offer, but ran into a storm of political and media criticism over the conflict of interest involved in heading an agency that did $4 million worth of business with Convair each year. Critchfield then withdrew his name from consideration.

In 1961, Critchfield accepted a professorship at the University of Wisconsin, but before he moved to Madison, his friends at Los Alamos, J. Carson Mark and Norris Bradbury offered him a position there that he took instead. He held this position until he retired in 1977, but he continued his association with the laboratory until his death after a long battle with cancer on February 12, 1994. His obituary in Physics Today was written by Carson Mark, Louis Rosen, Edward Teller, and Roger Meade.

Charles Critchfield is buried next to his wife, Jean, in Guaje Pines Cemetery in Los Alamos County, New Mexico.

== Books ==
- Theory of Atomic Nucleus and Nuclear Energy Sources (1949) - co-authored with George Gamow
