= J. Curry Street =

Jabez Curry Street (May 5, 1906 – November 7, 1989) was an American physicist, a co-discoverer of atomic particles called muons. Street was also notable for heading the group at the wartime Radiation Laboratory at MIT that created ground and ship radar systems. He also directed development of LORAN Navigation System, which is used worldwide for navigation purposes. Street was chairman of the physics department at Harvard University and acting director of the Cambridge Electron Accelerator, a member of the National Academy of Sciences. The National Academies Press called him "a boldly innovative experimental physicist whose discoveries in cosmic rays influenced decisively the course of high-energy physics."

== Chronology ==
- May 5, 1906: born in Opelika, Alabama
- 1927: B.S. in electrical engineering, the Alabama Polytechnic Institute (renamed in 1960 Auburn University)
- 1931: Ph.D., the University of Virginia with thesis The fall of potential in electrical discharges under the supervision of Jesse Wakefield Beams
- 1932–1970: Harvard University, Instructor to Professor of Physics
- 1936: elected a Fellow of the American Physical Society
- 1937: discovers muons with E. C. Stevenson at Harvard University
- 1940–1945: MIT Radiation Laboratory, Researcher
- 1953: elected to the National Academy of Sciences
- 1955–1960: Harvard University, Chair, Department of Physics
- 1962–1963: Harvard-MIT Cambridge Electron Accelerator, Acting Director
- 1970–1976: Harvard University, Mallinckrodt Professor of Physics
- 1976: retired
- 1976–1989: Harvard University, Emeritus Mallinckrodt Professor of Physics
- November 7, 1989: died in Charleston, South Carolina
