= Jesse Beams =

American physicist (1898–1977)

Jesse Wakefield Beams
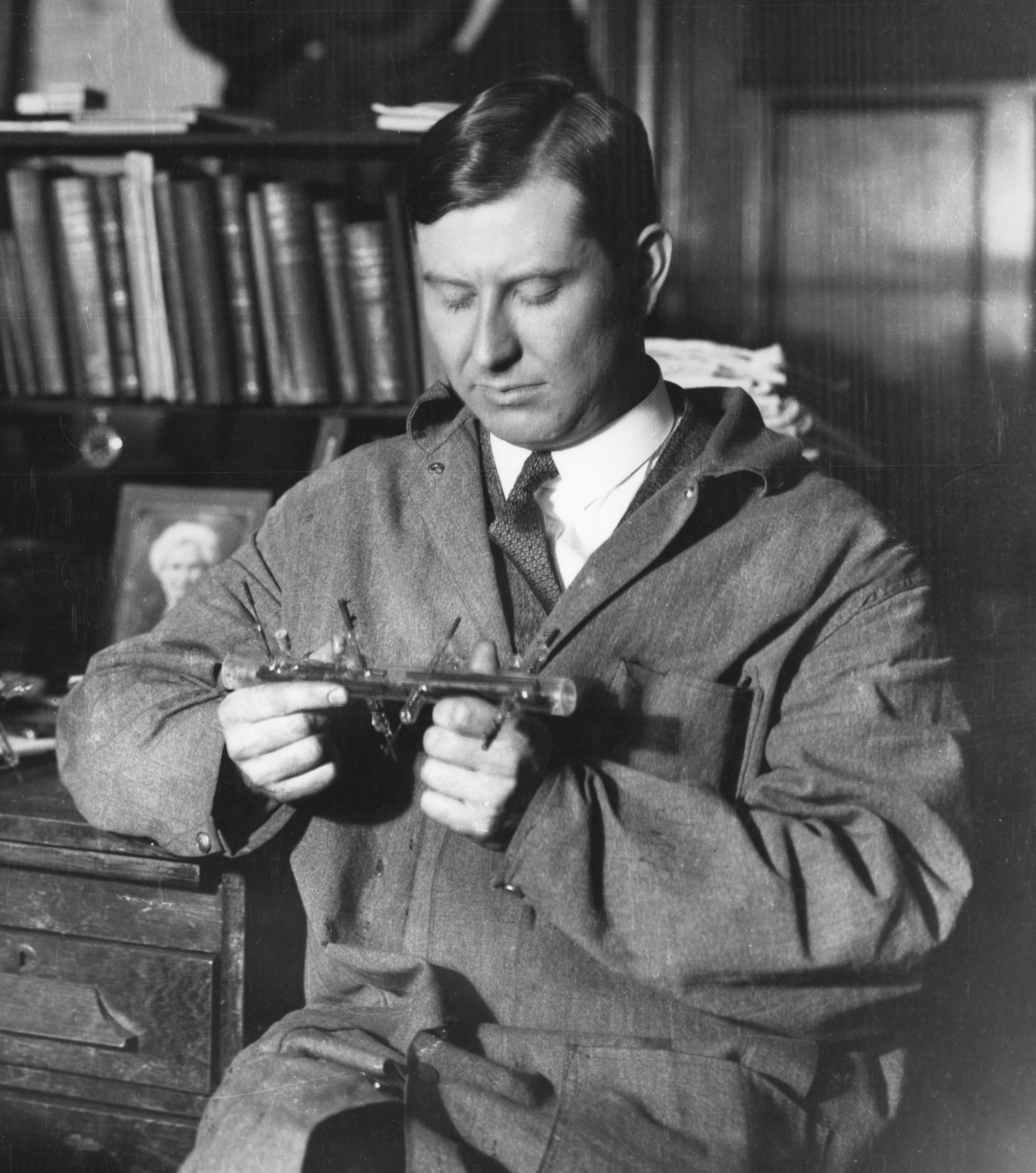
- Born: December 25, 1898; Belle Plaine, Kansas, US
- Died: July 23, 1977 (aged 78); Charlottesville, Virginia, US
- Education: University of Virginia, University of Wisconsin
- Known for: Development of the ultracentrifuge/gas centrifuge
- Awards: Howard N. Potts Medal (1942); National Medal of Science (1967)
- Scientific career
- Fields: Physics
- Workplaces: University of Virginia
- Doctoral advisor: Carroll M. Sparrow
- Notable students: Frank Hereford; Edward P. Ney; J. Curry Street

Jesse Wakefield Beams (December 25, 1898 in Belle Plaine, Kansas – July 23, 1977) was an American physicist at the University of Virginia. He was particularly known for his role in the development of the concept of gas centrifuge and the technology of ultracentrifuge.

== Biography ==
Beams completed his undergraduate B.A. in physics at Fairmount College in 1921 and his master's degree the next year at the University of Wisconsin. He spent most of his academic career at the University of Virginia, where he received his Ph.D. in physics in 1925. He spent the next three years in a physics fellowship at Yale University, where he performed research on the photoelectric effect with Ernest Lawrence. Beams was appointed a professor of physics at the University of Virginia in 1929 and was chair of the department from 1948 to 1962. During World War II, he worked on the Manhattan Project, where his ultracentrifuge was used to demonstrate the separation of the lighter uranium isotope U-235 from other isotopes. Officials in charge of the atomic bomb project concluded, however, that Beams's centrifuges were not as likely as other methods to produce enough highly enriched uranium for a bomb in the time available, and the centrifuge program was abandoned. After World War II, centrifuge separation of uranium isotopes was perfected by German scientists and engineers working in the Soviet Union. In 1953 Beams was appointed the Francis H. Smith Professor of Physics at the University of Virginia. Beams was awarded the National Medal of Science in 1967 for his work on the ultracentrifuge. He retired from the university in 1969.

Beams' contributions include the first linear electron accelerator, the magnetic ultracentrifuge, and the application of the ultracentrifuge to the separation of isotopes and to the separation of viruses from liquids. He held many patents in magnetic bearings and ultracentrifuges. In addition to the National Science Medal, he was awarded the American Physical Society's John Scott Medal, the Lewis Award of the American Philosophical Society (of which he was also a member), and the University of Virginia's first annual Thomas Jefferson Award.

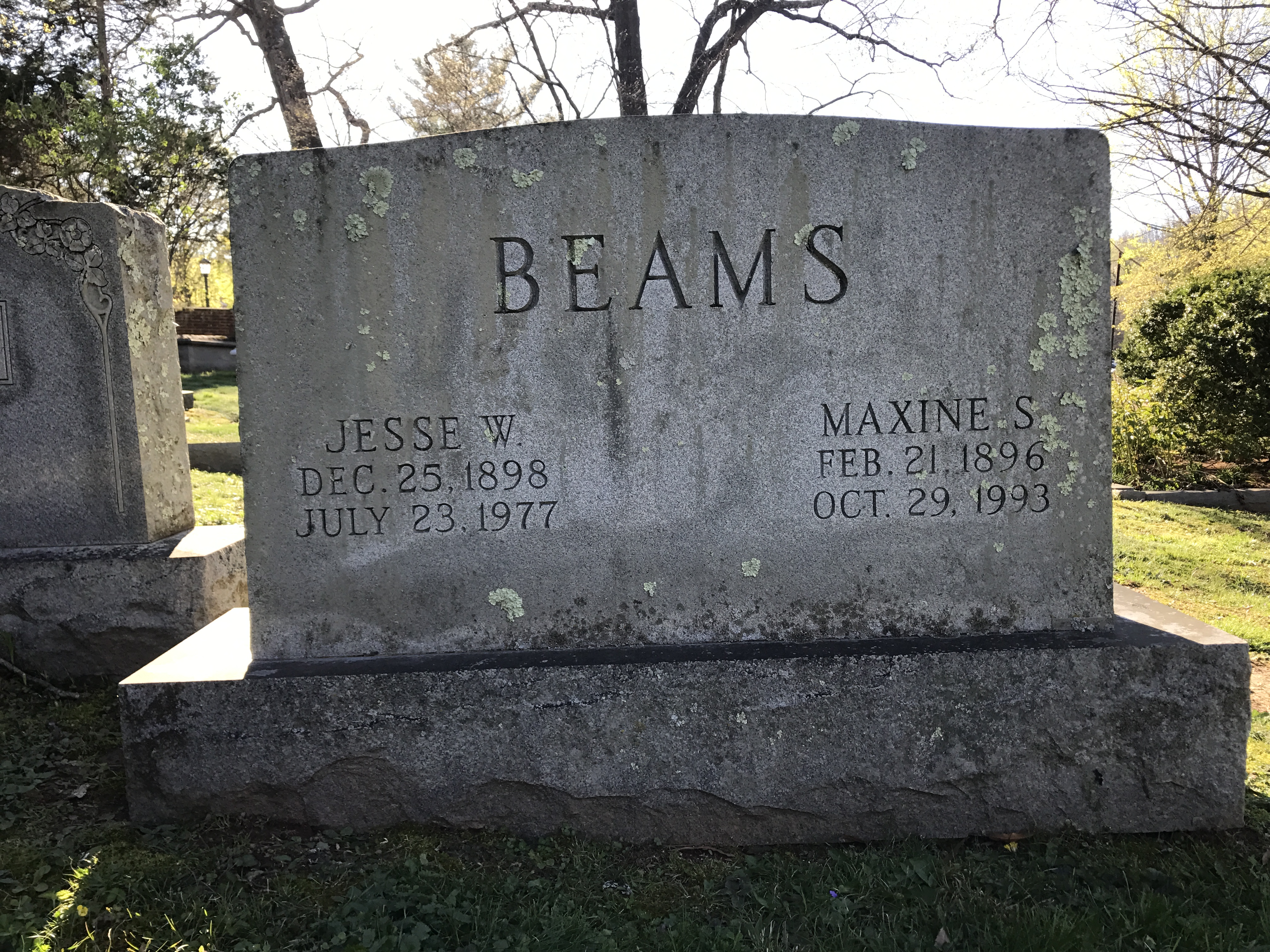
Beams's gravestone at the University of Virginia Cemetery in Charlottesville, Virginia.

He is buried at the University of Virginia Cemetery.

== Patents ==
Inventor(s)	Year	Patent No.	Invention Title
Trotter, Woodstock, Beams	1935	U.S. patent 2,016,825	Air Conditioning
Beams, Holmes	1941	U.S. patent 2,256,937	Suspension of Rotatable Bodies
Masket, Snoddy, Beams	1949	U.S. patent 2,478,663	Projectile Testing Machine
Beams	1950 *(filed 1944)	U.S. patent 2,521,112	Method and Apparatus for Separating Fluids by Thermal Diffusion
Beams	1950 *(filed 1944)	U.S. patent 2,521,891	Valve
Beams, Snoddy, Hoxton	1950 *(filed 1944)	U.S. patent 2,525,197	Thermal Flowmeter
Beams, Morton	1954	U.S. patent 2,666,363	Transmission Line Kerr Cell
Beams	1954	U.S. patent 2,691,306	Magnetically Supported Rotating Bodies
Beams, Snoddy	1956	U.S. patent 2,763,155	High Altitude Burner Simulator
Beams, Snoddy	1960 *(filed 1944)	U.S. patent 2,948,572	Centrifuges
Beams	1962	U.S. patent 3,041,482	Apparatus for Rotating Freely Suspended Bodies
Beams	1962	U.S. patent 3,066,849	High Vacuum Pump System
Beams	1965	U.S. patent 3,196,694	Magnetic Suspension System
Goss, Porter, Roberts, Tuve, Beams, Selvidge	1975 *(filed 1956)	U.S. patent 3,908,933	Guided Missile

Patents with the noted long duration between filing dates and being granted, along with their being assigned to either the United States Atomic Energy Commission or the United States Navy, indicates that they were kept classified under patent secrecy regulations.

== Publications ==
- Beams, J. W.; Haynes, F. B. (1936-09-01). "The Separation of Isotopes by Centrifuging". Physical Review. 50 (5). American Physical Society (APS): 491–492. Bibcode:1936PhRv...50..491B. doi:10.1103/physrev.50.491. ISSN 0031-899X.
- Beams, J. W. (1954-10-22). "Production and Use of High Centrifugal Fields". Science. 120 (3121). American Association for the Advancement of Science (AAAS): 619–625. Bibcode:1954Sci...120..619B. doi:10.1126/science.120.3121.619. ISSN 0036-8075. PMID 17816146.

== See also ==
- Magnetic bearings
