= Frank B. McDonald =

American astrophysicist (1925–2012)

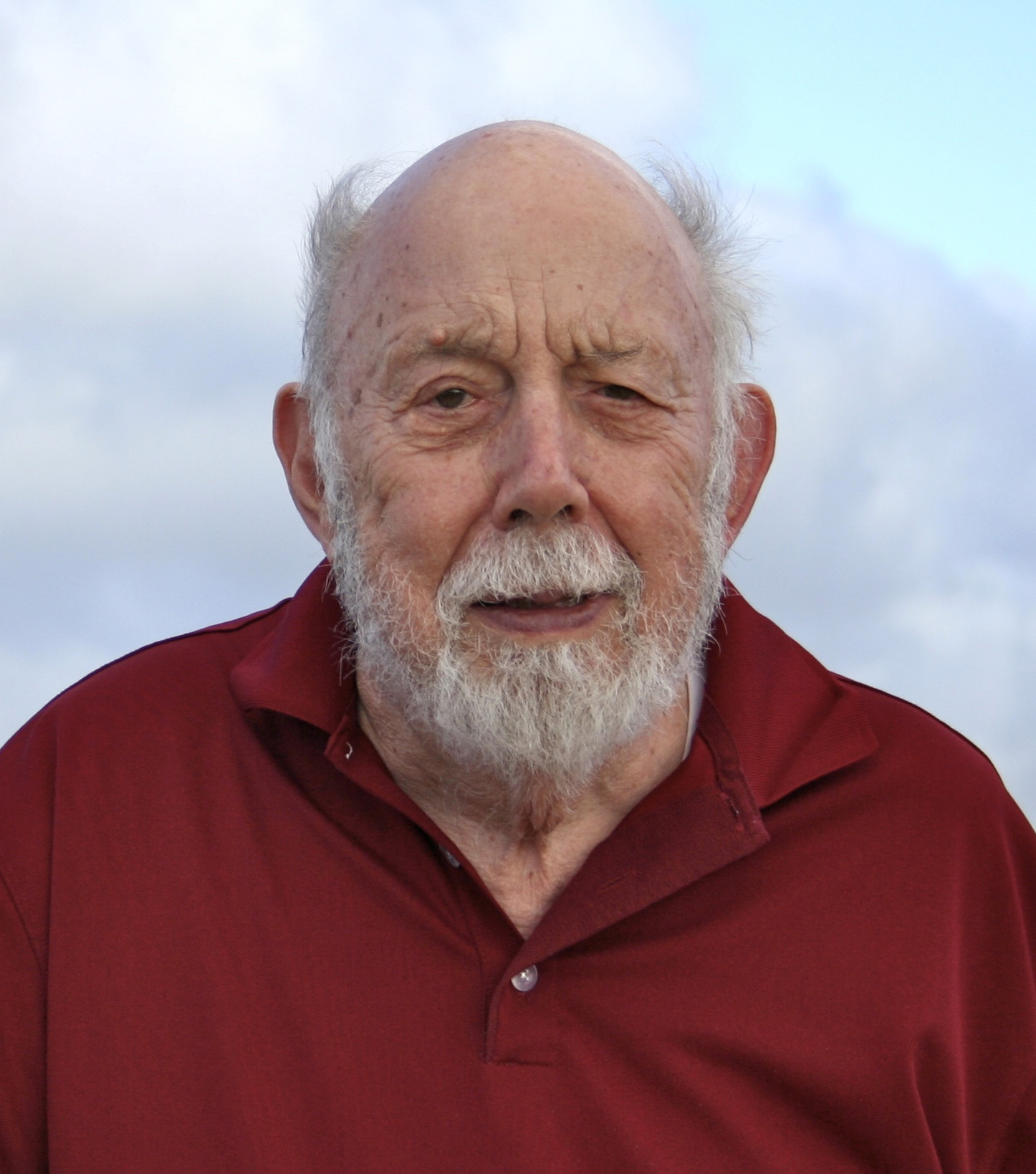
- Born: May 28, 1925; Columbus, Georgia
- Died: August 31, 2012 (aged 87); Ann Arbor, Michigan
- Citizenship: American
- Education: Duke University; University of Minnesota
- Scientific career
- Fields: Physics, Astrophysics
- Workplaces: University of Iowa; Goddard Space Flight Center; University of Maryland
- Doctoral advisor: Edward P. Ney
- Notable students: Bonnard J. Teegarden

Frank Bethune McDonald (May 28, 1925 – August 31, 2012) was an American astrophysicist who helped design scientific instruments for research flights into space. He was a key force behind several initiatives and programs of the National Aeronautics and Space Administration, for which he served as chief scientist.

During his career, he was project scientist on nine NASA missions and principal investigator on 15 space experiments. He wrote more than 300 scientific publications. In 1986, he was elected to the National Academy of Sciences.

== Biography ==
=== Early life and education ===
McDonald was born in Columbus, Georgia to Frank B. McDonald and Lucy Kyle McDonald. After he graduated from Duke University in 1948, he attended the University of Minnesota where he obtained a master's degree in 1951. Here, under the supervision of Edward P. Ney, he completed a doctorate in physics in 1955. For his thesis, he carried out balloon flights to the top of the atmosphere of a cloud chamber triggered by a scintillation counter to study the charge distribution of primary cosmic rays.

=== Iowa ===
In 1956, McDonald began his career at the University of Iowa. In collaboration with James A. Van Allen he worked on "rockoons", which were small rockets lifted to 70,000 feet by balloons. At this height, the rockets would ignite and shoot up to 350,000 feet, carrying equipment intended to study cosmic rays and particles trapped in Earth's magnetic field. The same year, McDonald combined the scintillation counter of his thesis with a cherenkov detector into a balloon instrument that not only provided a novel measurement of the energy spectrum of primary cosmic ray helium nuclei, but also served as a prototype for devices carried on many spacecraft.

=== Goddard Space Flight Center ===
In 1959, McDonald became one of the first scientists to join NASA's new Goddard Space Flight Center in Greenbelt, Maryland. For the next 11 years, he carried out cosmic ray research here as head of the Energetic Particles Branch. During that time, he provided the conceptual framework for a series of small spacecraft known as the international monitoring platforms, or IMP.

From 1970 to 1982, McDonald was chief of Goddard's Laboratory of High Energy Astrophysics, where he helped design a satellite program with instruments that could study X-rays, gamma rays and cosmic rays. He also led experiments flown on space probes that have gone beyond the Solar System. In particular, on Pioneer 10, Pioneer 11, Voyager 1 and Voyager 2, he helped design, build and use instruments to measure cosmic rays.

=== NASA Chief Scientist ===
From 1982 to 1987, as NASA Chief Scientist, McDonald was a principal adviser to the NASA administrator and other senior officials. In that role, he helped start a NASA partnership with historically black colleges to fund research projects by faculty members and graduate students.

He also played an active role launching NASA's Teacher in Space Project to connect schoolchildren with science and space exploration. Christa McAuliffe, the first teacher in space, died in the Space Shuttle Challenger disaster in 1986.

In 1987, McDonald returned to Goddard, where he became associate director and chief scientist.

=== Maryland ===
After McDonald retired from NASA in 1989, he joined the Institute for Physical Science and Technology at the University of Maryland, where he was a senior research scientist until his death. While at Maryland, he was awarded the 2003 Ó Ceallaigh Medal by the IUPAP Cosmic Ray Commission.
