= NASA Chief Scientist =

Senior science position at the NASA

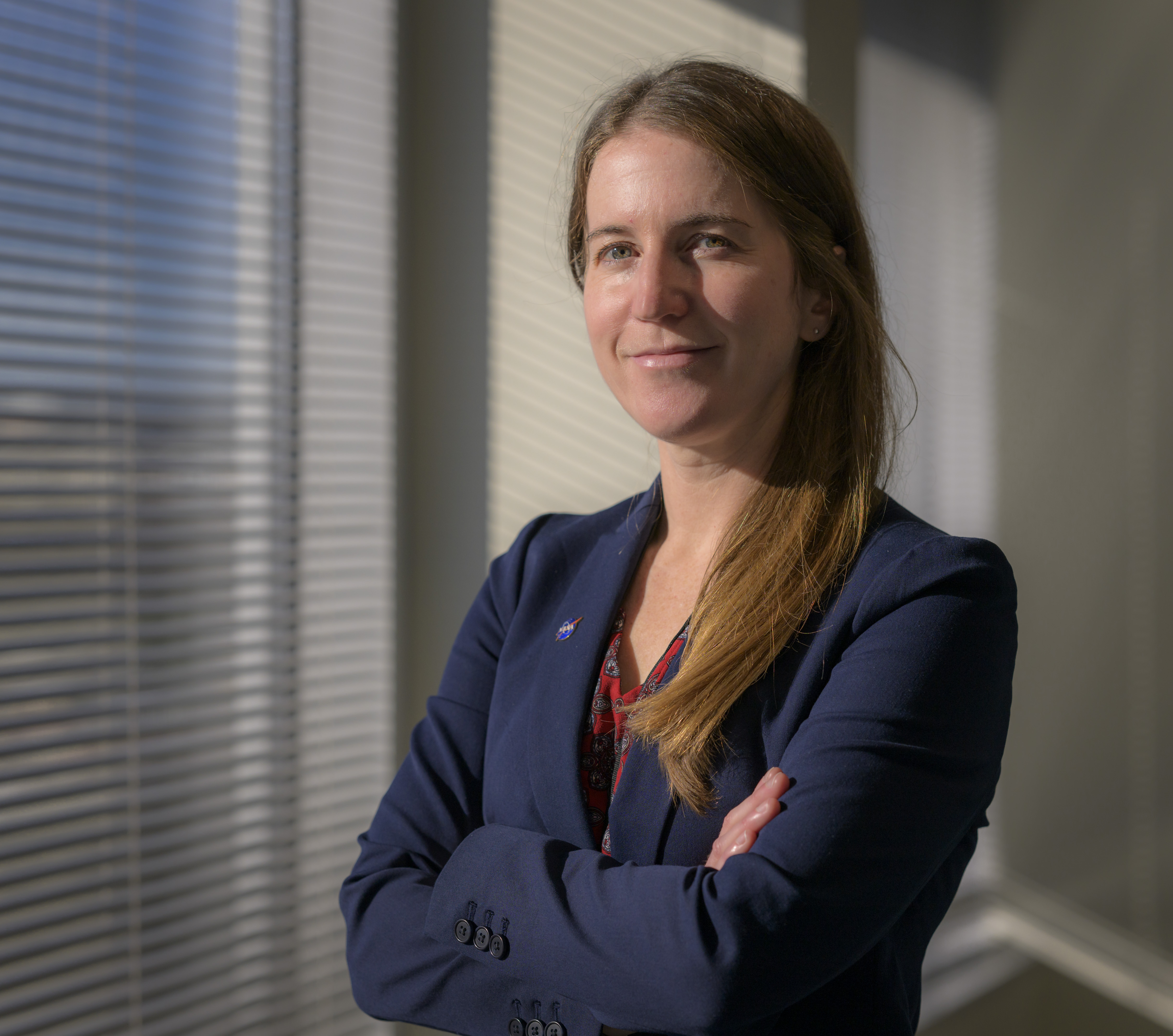
- Last officeholder Dr. Katherine Calvin in 2022
- Status: Position abolished
- Reports to: NASA Administrator
- Appointer: NASA Administrator
- Formation: 1982
- First holder: Frank B. McDonald
- Final holder: Katherine Calvin
- Abolished: March 10, 2025

Chief Scientist is the most senior science position at the National Aeronautics and Space Administration (NASA). The chief scientist serves as the principal advisor to the NASA Administrator in science issues and as interface to the national and international science community, ensuring that NASA research programs are scientifically and technologically well founded and are appropriate for their intended applications.

== History ==
The Chief Scientist position was created to advise the NASA Administrator on budget, strategic objectives, and current content of NASA's science programs. The Chief Scientist works closely with appropriate representatives of the NASA Strategic Enterprises and the Field Centers, as well as advisory committees and the external community. The Chief Scientist represents the agency's scientific objectives and accomplishments to other federal agencies, industry, academia, other government organizations, the international community, and the general public.

The chief scientist chairs the NASA Science Council, a forum for discussion of the agency policies, practices, and issues from the viewpoint of the science disciplines.

The NASA chief scientist position was discontinued in September 2005 and many of the functions moved to be within the Science Mission Directorate (SMD).

The position was restored in 2011 and was eliminated for a second time in 2025. The final abolishment of the position included two additional departments, the DEIA and the Office of Technology, Policy, and Strategy.

== List of chief scientists ==
The following is a list of NASA chief scientists. All officeholders have earned multiple masters and doctoral degrees in a hard science or engineering.

No.	Image	Name	Term start	Term end	Notes
1		Frank B. McDonald	1982	1987	
2		Noel Hinners	1987	1989	
3		France A. Córdova	1993	1996	
4		Kathie L. Olsen	May 24, 1999	April 2002	
5		Shannon Lucid	February 2002	September 2003	
6		John M. Grunsfeld	September 2003	October 20, 2004	
7		James B. Garvin	October 21, 2004	September 2005	
Position was eliminated in September 2005 but was restored in January 2011
8		Waleed Abdalati	January 3, 2011	December 2012	
acting		Gale Allen	December 2012	August 24, 2013	
9		Ellen Stofan	August 25, 2013	December 2016	
acting		Gale Allen	December 2016	April 30, 2018	
10		Jim Green	May 1, 2018	December 31, 2021	
11		Katherine Calvin	January 10, 2022	March 11, 2025	
Position was eliminated in March 2025.
