= Phyllis S. Freier =

American astrophysicist

- Born: Phyllis St. Cyr; Minneapolis, Minnesota
- Died: December 18, 1992 (aged 71); St. Paul, Minnesota
- Education: University of Minnesota, Minneapolis (B.S., M.A., Ph.D.)
- Spouse: George Freier
- Scientific career
- Fields: Astrophysics
- Workplaces: University of Minnesota, Minneapolis

Phyllis S. Freier (19 January 1921, Minneapolis – 18 December 1992, St. Paul) was an American astrophysicist and a Fellow, American Association for the Advancement of Science and a Fellow, American Physical Society. Freier also served on NASA committees. As a graduate student she presented evidence for the existence of elements heavier than helium in cosmic radiation. Her work was published in Physical Review in 1948 with co-authors Edward J. Lofgren, Edward P. Ney, and Frank Oppenheimer.

== Early life and education ==
Phyllis St. Cyr was born in Minneapolis, Minnesota, on January 21, 1921. She received her B.S. in 1942, her M.A. in 1944, and finally her Ph.D. in 1950 from the University of Minnesota, Minneapolis. St. Cyr married fellow physicist George Freier after receiving her M.A.

== Career ==
During World War II, Freier was employed as a physicist at the Naval Ordnance Laboratory from 1944 to 1945. Following the war, she continued her graduate studies in physics at the University of Minnesota. Freier worked on her doctoral research with Edward Ney and Frank Oppenheimer, using high altitude balloons to study cosmic radiation. In 1948, this research led to Freier becoming the first person to see tracks in nuclear emulsions, proving that nuclei of heavy elements were included in cosmic radiation. After completing her Ph.D., Freier was a research associate at the University of Minnesota, Minneapolis from 1950 to 1970. She stayed at that university and from 1970 to 1975 she was an associate professor, and from 1975 to 1992 she was a professor of physics.

In 1988, Freier was recognized by the University of Minnesota with a distinguished teaching award for her outstanding contributions to the education of physics undergraduates. She taught for eighteen years where she originated the application of student textbook learning to the laboratory settings.

== Research contributions ==
More specifically, Freier was an internationally reputable cosmic-ray physicist. Her expertise was the application of nuclear emulsions to astrophysics and physics. At the University of Minnesota, she and her colleagues discovered the presence of heavy nuclei in cosmic radiation, which remains one of the key discoveries in astrophysics.

In addition to her contribution as graduate student, mentioned above, she also published other significant contributions in the fields of particle physics, geophysics, and astrophysics that covered nuclear emission spectra, cosmic rays, and applying nuclear emulsions.

== Death ==
Freier died at home in St. Paul, Minnesota, on December 18, 1992, from Parkinson's disease.

== Legacy ==
- "Primary Cosmic Radiation," Phys. Rev. 74:1818-1827 (1948) with E.J. Lofgren, E.P. Ney, and F. Oppenheimer
- "Emulsion Measurements of Solar Alpha Particles and Protons," J. Geophys. Res. 68:1605-1629 (1963)
- "The Helium Nuclei of the Primary Cosmic Radiation as Studied over a Solar Cycle of Activity, Interpreted in Terms of the Electric Field Modulation," Space Science Reviews 4:313-371 (1965) with C.J. Waddington
- "The Cascading of Cosmic Ray Nuclei in Various Media," Astrophys. and Space Sci. 38:419-436 (1975)with C.J. Waddington.
- "Nucleus-Nucleus Collisions and Interpretation of Cosmic Ray Cascades above 100 TeV," Phys. Rev. D Vol. 25, No. 9, 1 May (1982) with T.K. Gaisser, Todor Stanev, and C.J. Waddington.
- "The Interactions of Energetic Gold Nuclei in Nuclear Emulsions," Nucl. Tracks 9:107-111 (1984) with C.J. Waddington.
- "Central Collisions 14.6, 60, and 200 GeV/Nucleon ^{16}O Nuclei in Nuclear Emulsion," Phys. Rev. Lett. 60:405 (1988)with L.M. Barbier, R. Holynski, W.V. Jones, A. Jurak, A. Olszewski, O.E. Pruet, C.J. Waddington, J.P. Wefel, B. Wilczynska, H. Wilczynski, W. Wolter, and B. Wosiek.

== Honors ==
Fellow, American Association for the Advancement of Science Fellow, American Physical Society

Horace T. Morse-Minnesota Alumni Association Award
