= Kathie L. Olsen =

American neuroscientist

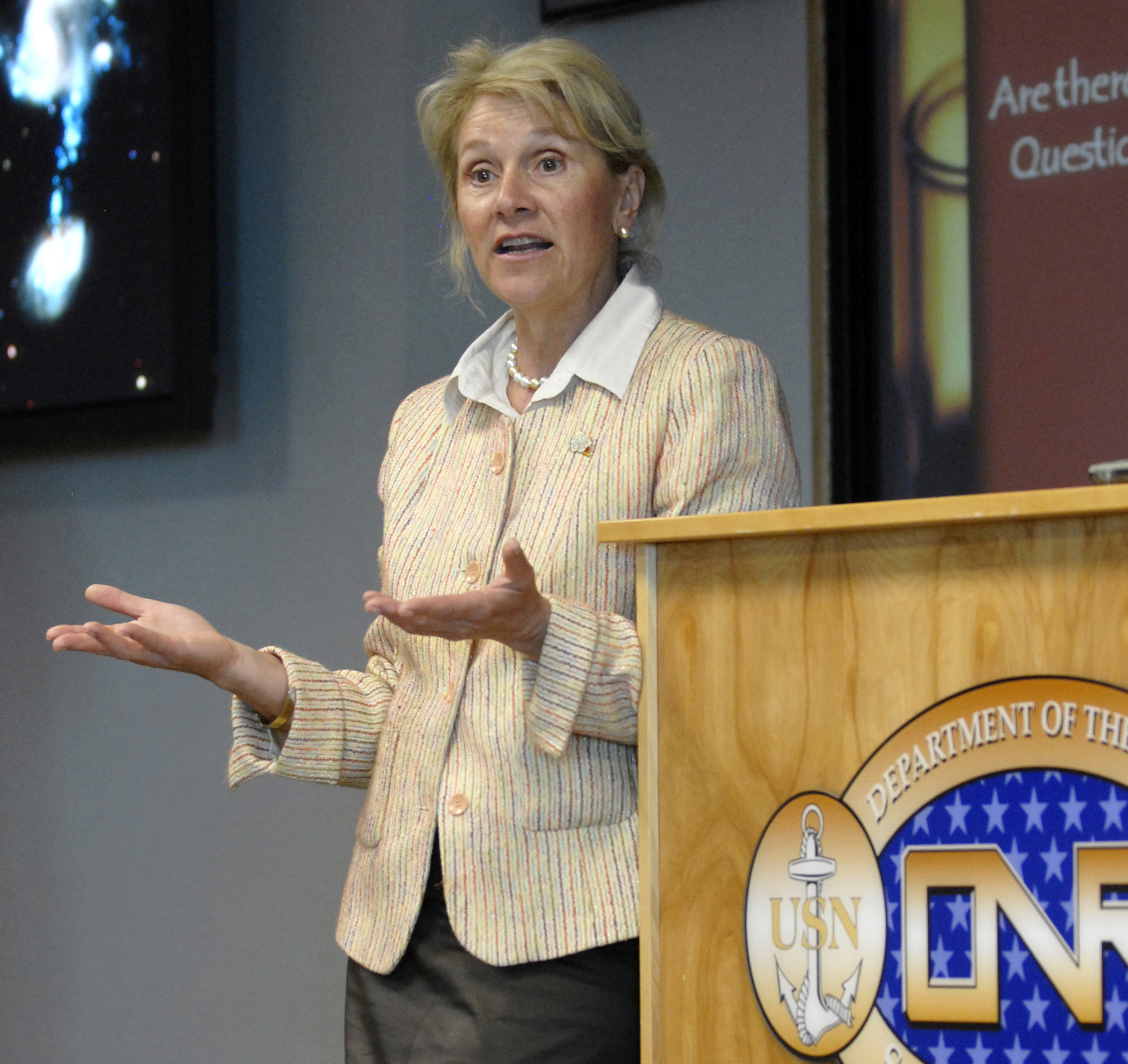
Dr. Kathie Olsen speaks to employees of the US Office of Naval Research

Kathie L. Olsen is an American neuroscientist who is noted for her work in scientific policy. Between August 2005 and January 2009, she was the deputy director and Chief Operating Officer of the National Science Foundation, a United States government agency. She was also NASA's Chief Scientist from May 24, 1999, to April 2002.

She serves on the advisory board of the Journal of Science Policy & Governance.

== Biography ==
Olsen earned a BS with honors from Chatham College in Pittsburgh Pa where she majored in biology and psychology. She earned her Ph.D. in neuroscience in 1979 with a dissertation entitled Hormonal mechanisms controlling the development and regulation of male-female differences, from University of California, Irvine.

Olsen conducted post-doctoral research in the department of neuroscience at Children's Hospital of Harvard Medical School. There, her NIH fellowship supported her research on neural and genetic mechanisms underlying development and expression of behavior. She started a lab at the State University of New York (SUNY) as an assistant professor. From there, she was recruited to NSF.

== Career ==
Olsen worked as a Brookings Institute Fellow from the National Science Foundation in 1995 in Senator Conrad Burns office where he oversaw NASA and NSF appropriations. There, she learned policy. In 1997, she became Senior Staff Associate for Science an Technology Centers at NSF.

Olsen served as Chief Scientist for NASA (1999–2002) and the Acting Associate Administrator for the Enterprise in Biological and Physical Research (2000–2002). She followed by serving in the federal government in scientific leadership positions including Deputy Director and Chief Operating Officer of NSF, 2005 – 2009. There, she was responsible for management and oversight of program creation and administration, collaborations, strategic and budget development. Previously, she served as Associate Director for the Office of Science and Technology Policy responsible for overseeing science and education policy.

Olsen has served in the academic sector by working with University of Nebraska-Lincoln as the Office of Research and Innovation's primary NSF consultant. She has helped UNL researchers and strengthened the university's research culture and competitiveness.

Olsen was the Vice President for International Programs at the Association of Public and Land Grant Universities (APLU).

Olsen is the Founder of KLO International, LLC, a consulting firm in Virginia. Olsen serves on the Carl R. Wose Institute for Genomic Biology advisory panel.

== Awards and honors ==
Twice nominated as a member of ARCS in 1995 and 2007. Olsen received University of Nebraska Lincoln's Champion of Research Award to recognize her exceptional contributions to UNL's research mission which included the award of dozens of federal grants. In addition, she was given an admiralship in the Great Navy of the State of Nebraska. Olsen serves on the advisory board of the Journal of Science Policy and Government.

(temporarily a list derived from

- Commander of the Norwegian Royal Order of Merit
- NASA Outstanding Leadership Medal
- NSF Director's Award of Excellence
- 2014: Barry M. Goldwater Educator Award from the American Institute of Aeronautic and Astronautics
- 2000: Barnard College Medal of Distinction
- Elected fellow of the American Association for the Advancement of Science
- Association for Women in Science
- Elected member of the Explorer's Club
- Honorary doctoral degrees from Chatham College, Clarkson University and University of South Carolina

== Significant publications ==
=== Book ===
- Haug, M, R. Whalen, R.E; Aron, Cl., and Olsen, K (Eds.). The Development of Sex Differences and Similarities in Behaviour. Dordrecht: Kluwar Academic Publishers, 1993.

=== Book chapters ===
- Olsen, K.L. and Carlson, A., "Federal Science Policy: A Perspective from Inside the Beltway" in Defining Values for Research and Technology-The University's Changing Role. Greenough, W.T, McConnaughay, P. J., and Kesan, J. P. New York: Rowman & Littlefield Publishers, 2007.
- Olsen, K.L., "Sex and the Mutant Mouse: Strategies for Understanding the Sexual Differentiation of the Brain," in NATO Advanced Research Workshop: The Development of Sex Differences and Similarities in Behaviour. M. Haug, R. Whalen, Cl. Aron, and K. L. Olsen (Eds.) Dordrecht: Kluwar Academic Publishers, 1993.
- Olsen, K.L., "Genetic Influences on Sexual Behavior Differentiation," in Sexual Differentiation: A Life-Span Approach, Handbook of Neurobiology. Handbook of Behavioral Neurobiology. A. Gerall, H. Moltz, and I. L. Ward (Eds.) Plenum Press, 1992, pp. 1–40.
- Olsen, K.L., "Aromatization: Is It Critical for Differentiation of Sexually Dimorphic Behaviors?" in Neurobiology. R. Gilles and J. Balthazart (Eds.) Berlin/Heidelberg: Springer-Verlag, 1985, pp. 149–164.
- Olsen, K.L., "Genetic Determinants of Sexual Differentiation," in Hormones and Behavior in Higher Vertebrates. J. Balthazart, E. Prove, and R. Gilles (Eds.). Heidelberg: Springer-Verlag, 1983, pp. 138–158,
- Fox, T.O., Olsen, K.L., Vito, C.C., and Wieland, S.J., "Putative Steroid Receptors: Genetics and Development," in Molecular Genetics and Neurosciences: A New Hybrid. F.O. Schmitt, S.J. Bird, and F.E. Bloom (Eds.). New York: Raven Press, 1983, pp. 289–306.

=== Significant articles ===
- Olsen, Kathie. L.; Neysa M. Call; Melissa A. Summers; and Ann B. Carlson. "The Evolution of Excellence: Policies, Paradigms, and Practices Shaping U.S. Research and Development. In China, India, and the United States (Special Issue)". Technology in Society: An International Journal, vol. 30, no. 3–4, 2008.
- Silver, R.; Boahen, K.; Grillner, S.; Kopell, N.; Olsen, K. L. (2007). "Neurotech for Neuroscience: Unifying Concepts, Organizing Principles, and Emerging Tools". Journal of Neuroscience. 27 (44): 11807–11819. doi:10.1523/JNEUROSCI.3575-07.2007. PMC 3275424. PMID 17978017.
- Goldin, D. S.; Dahl, C. A.; Olsen, K. L.; Ostrach, L. H.; Klausner, R. D. (2001). "Biomedicine. The NASA-NCI collaboration on biomolecular sensors". Science. 292 (5516): 443–444. doi:10.1126/science.1059744. PMID 11330296. S2CID 44386403.
- Charest, N. J.; Zhou, Z. X.; Lubahn, D. B.; Olsen, K. L.; Wilson, E. M.; French, F. S. (1991). "A frameshift mutation destabilizes androgen receptor messenger RNA in the Tfm mouse". Molecular Endocrinology. 5 (4): 573–581. doi:10.1210/mend-5-4-573. PMID 1681426.
- Yarbrough, W. G.; Quarmby, V. E.; Simental, J. A.; Joseph, D. R.; Sar, M.; Lubahn, D. B.; Olsen, K. L.; French, F. S.; Wilson, E. M. (1990). "A single base mutation in the androgen receptor gene causes androgen insensitivity in the testicular feminized rat". The Journal of Biological Chemistry. 265 (15): 8893–8900. doi:10.1016/S0021-9258(19)38972-0. PMID 2341409.
- Olsen, K. L.; Heydorn, W. E.; Rodriguez-Sierra, J. F.; Jacobowitz, D. M. (1989). "Quantification of proteins in discrete brain regions of androgen-insensitive testicular feminized Tfm mice". Neuroendocrinology. 50 (4): 392–399. doi:10.1159/000125254. PMID 2812273.
- Olsen, K. L.; Edwards, E.; Schechter, N.; Whalen, R. E. (1988). "Muscarinic receptors in preoptic area and hypothalamus: Effects of cyclicity, sex and estrogen treatment". Brain Research. 448 (2): 223–229. doi:10.1016/0006-8993(88)91259-0. PMID 3378147. S2CID 41369568.
- Olsen, K. L. (1988). "A comparison of the effects of three androgens on sexual differentiation in female hamsters". Physiology & Behavior. 42 (6): 569–573. doi:10.1016/0031-9384(88)90159-x. PMID 3261873. S2CID 5540312.
- Whalen, R. E.; Gladue, B. A.; Olsen, K. L. (1986). "Lordotic behavior in male rats: Genetic and hormonal regulation of sexual differentiation". Hormones and Behavior. 20 (1): 73–82. doi:10.1016/0018-506x(86)90030-9. PMID 3957262. S2CID 24726154.
- Olsen, K. L.; Whalen, R. E. (1984). "Dihydrotestosterone activates male mating behavior in castrated King-Holtzman rats". Hormones and Behavior. 18 (4): 380–392. doi:10.1016/0018-506x(84)90024-2. PMID 6519654. S2CID 38442925.
- Olsen, K. L. (1983). "Effects of 17 beta-hydroxy-17 alpha-methyl-estra-4,9,11-triene-3-one (R 1881): Evidence for direct involvement of androgens in the defeminization of behaviour in rats". The Journal of Endocrinology. 98 (3): 431–438. doi:10.1677/joe.0.0980431. PMID 6604780.
- Olsen, K. L.; Whalen, R. E. (1982). "Estrogen binds to hypothalamic nuclei of androgen-insensitive (tfm) rats". Experientia. 38 (1): 139–140. doi:10.1007/bf01944575. PMID 7056359. S2CID 13136260.
- Olsen, K. L.; Whalen, R. E. (1981). "Hormonal control of the development of sexual behavior in androgen-insensitive (tfm) rats". Physiology & Behavior. 27 (5): 883–886. doi:10.1016/0031-9384(81)90058-5. PMID 7323196. S2CID 1600059.
- Whalen, R. E.; Olsen, K. L. (1981). "Role of aromatization in sexual differentiation: Effects of prenatal ATD treatment and neonatal castration". Hormones and Behavior. 15 (2): 107–122. doi:10.1016/0018-506x(81)90022-2. PMID 7250905. S2CID 36765150.
- Olsen, K. L.; Whalen, R. E. (1980). "Sexual differentiation of the brain: Effects on mating behavior and 3H-estradiol binding by hypothalamic chromatin in rats". Biology of Reproduction. 22 (5): 1068–1072. doi:10.1095/biolreprod22.5.1068. PMID 7417642.
- Olsen, K. L. (1979). "Induction of male mating behavior in androgen-insensitive (tfm) and Normal (King-Holtzman) male rats: Effect of testosterone propionate, estradiol benzoate, and dihydrotestosterone". Hormones and Behavior. 13 (1): 66–84. doi:10.1016/0018-506x(79)90035-7. PMID 521021. S2CID 44397548.
- Olsen, K. L. (1979). "Androgen-insensitive rats are defeminised by their testes". Nature. 279 (5710): 238–239. Bibcode:1979Natur.279..238O. doi:10.1038/279238a0. PMID 440434. S2CID 4328258.
- Whalen, R. E.; Olsen, K. L. (1978). "Prednisolone modifies estrogen-induced sexual differentiation". Behavioral Biology. 24 (4): 549–553. doi:10.1016/s0091-6773(78)91023-4. PMID 747592.
- Whalen, R. E.; Olsen, K. L. (1978). "Chromatin binding of estradiol in the hypothalamus and cortex of male and female rats". Brain Research. 152 (1): 121–131. doi:10.1016/0006-8993(78)90138-5. PMID 679020. S2CID 32749637.
- Whalen, R. E.; Martin, J. V.; Olsen, K. L. (1975). "Effect of oestrogen antagonist on hypothalamic oestrogen receptors". Nature. 258 (5537): 742–743. Bibcode:1975Natur.258..742W. doi:10.1038/258742a0. PMID 174000. S2CID 4249568.

== See also ==
- National Science Foundation
- National Aeronautics and Space Administration (NASA)
