= Katherine Calvin =

American earth scientist

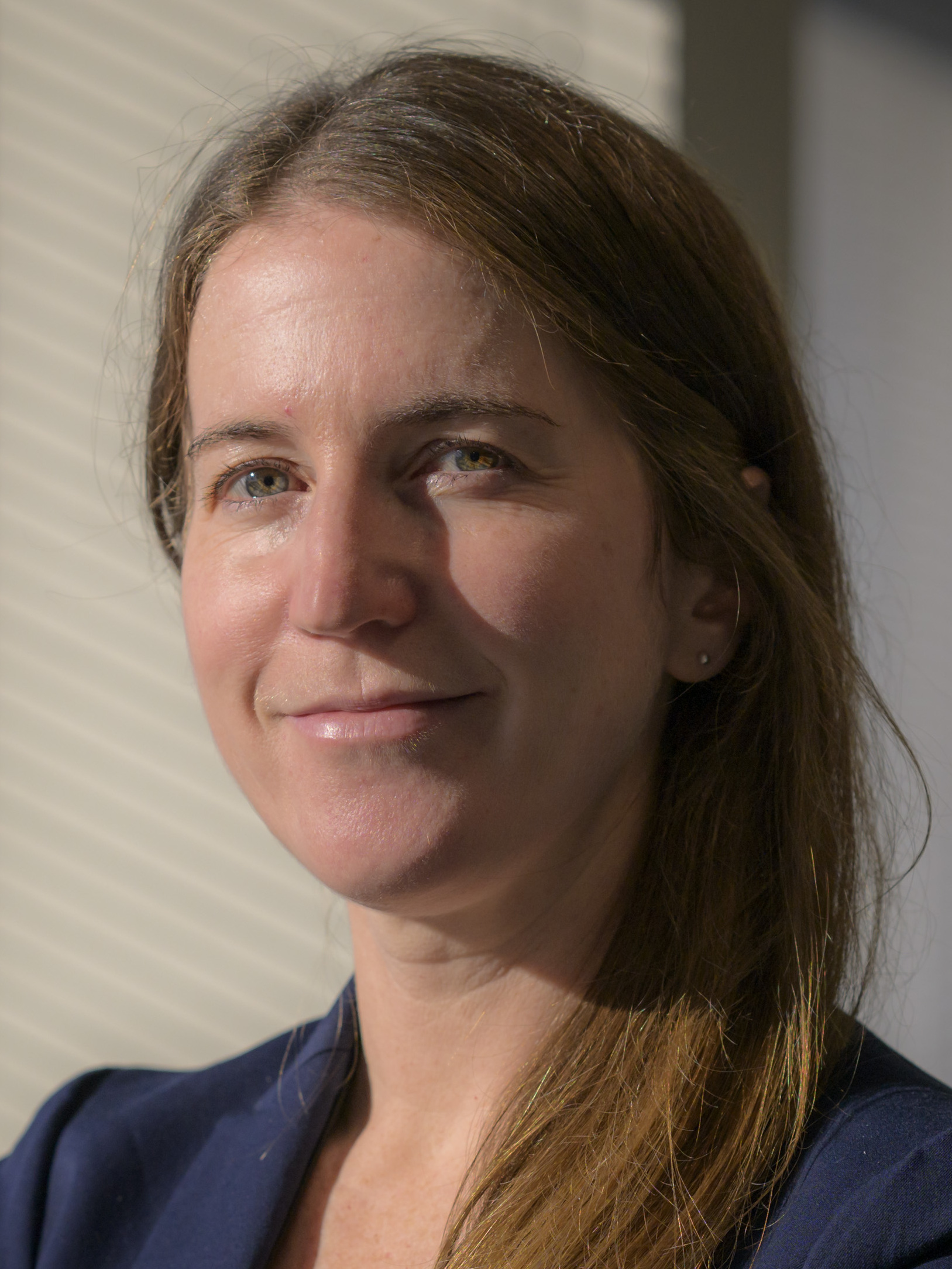
- Calvin in 2022
- Education: University of Maryland; Stanford University
- Known for: Contributions to US National Climate Assessment and IPCC special reports on climate change
- Scientific career
- Fields: Earth science, Integrated assessment, Land use, Climate science
- Workplaces: NASA, Joint Global Change Research Institute, Pacific Northwest National Laboratory, University of Maryland, US Energy Information Administration

Katherine Calvin (born in the 1980s) is an American scientist. From 2022 to 2025, she was NASA's Chief Scientist and Senior Climate Advisor. In July 2023, she was elected co-chair of the Intergovernmental Panel on Climate Change (IPCC) Working Group III. As an earth scientist at the Joint Global Change Research Institute (JGCRI), she has researched human use of global resources using Earth modeling systems at JGCRI under the direction of Pacific Northwest National Laboratory (PNNL) and the University of Maryland. She has contributed to the third US National Climate Assessment as well as two special reports by the Intergovernmental Panel on Climate Change (IPCC).

== Education ==
Calvin attended the University of Maryland from 1999 to 2003 where she earned bachelor's degrees in computer science and mathematics. She then attended Stanford University where she earned her master's degree and PhD in management science and engineering. While earning her PhD, Calvin worked at the US Energy Information Administration for two years as an international energy analyst. She completed her thesis, titled "Participation in international environmental agreements : a game-theoretic study" in 2008.

== Career and research ==
After completing her PhD in 2008, Calvin began working at PNNL. She works in College Park Maryland with JGCRI's Global Change Assessment Model, a system for exploring and analyzing the relationships between Earth systems in response to global climate change. Her research simulates the interaction between global resources, focusing on the impact of land, water, and energy use through an environmental and socioeconomic lens. In her eleven years at PNNL, Calvin has co-authored over 90 PNNL publications, 20 of which she was the primary author. Her recent publications have investigated growing populations against agriculture and water scarcity in the face of climate change.

In 2015, Calvin was selected to serve on a National Academy of Sciences research committee on models of the world. The committee was commissioned by the National Geospatial Intelligence Agency to create various models for interrelated global systems such as economics, politics, and environment. The committee successfully concluded its research the following year, and its findings were published under the National Academies Press.

=== National Climate Assessment ===
Calvin was a lead author on the "Mitigation" chapter of the United States' third National Climate Assessment in 2014. The chapter describes the degree that which reduced global carbon dioxide emissions would alleviate the effects of climate change and concludes that the world's governments would need to heavily reduce the amount of global carbon dioxide emissions by the end of the century in order to limit the global increase in temperature to 3-5°F (1.5-3°C). The chapter closes by offering potential measures to reduce the United States' greenhouse gas emissions.

=== IPCC Special Reports ===
Calvin has contributed to two IPCC special reports on climate change. In 2018 the IPCC used Calvin's research on its Special Report on Global Warming of 1.5°C. Calvin was a contributing author on chapter two of the report, which offered strategies to mitigate the effects of climate change in order to prevent a global average temperature increase of 1.5 °C. The article cited Calvin's research on land use and its relationship with socioeconomic and environmental effects.

Calvin also contributed to the IPCC's Special Report on Climate Change and Land in 2019. This report examines the effect that elevated greenhouse gasses will have on the planet from a perspective of human land usage. Calvin was a coordinating lead author in the report's sixth chapter, in which her research was used extensively throughout. Chapter six offers pathways of mitigating the harmful effects of global climate change on land use, such as reduced deforestation and agricultural diversification.

== Publications ==
Notable articles by Calvin include:

- The RCP greenhouse gas concentrations and their extensions from 1765 to 2300. Meinshausen et al., Climatic Change, 2011.
- RCP4.5: a pathway for stabilization of radiative forcing by 2100. Thomson et al., Climatic Change, 2011.
- Implications of limiting CO2 concentrations for land use and energy. Wise et al., Science, 2009.
- The shared socioeconomic pathways and their energy, land use, and greenhouse gas emissions implications: an overview. Riahi et al., Global Environmental Change, 2017.
- 2.6: Limiting climate change to 450 ppm CO2 equivalent in the 21st century. Calvin et al., Energy Economics, 2009.

== Awards ==
In 2015, Calvin was awarded PNNL's Ronald L. Brodzinski Early Career Exceptional Achievement Award. She was nominated by Ghassem Asrar, director of JGCRI.

In 2019, Calvin received the Piers J. Sellers Global Environmental Change Mid-Career Award from the American Geophysical Union. She also received the IAMC Award for extraordinary contributions to the field of integrated assessment modeling.

- Highly Cited Researcher (2020)
