= O'Brien Observatory =

Observatory in Minnesota, US

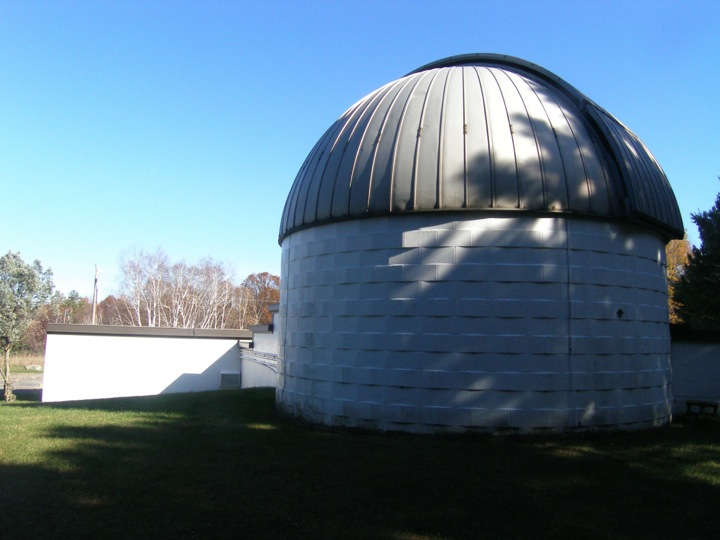
- Organization: University of Minnesota
- Location: Marine on St. Croix, Minnesota
- Coordinates: 45.1815°N 92.7757°W
- Altitude: 308 meters (1,010 ft)
- Established: 1968
- Website: O'Brien Observatory

Telescopes
- unnamed telescope: 0.76 m reflector

The O'Brien Observatory (OBO) is an astronomical observatory in the city of Marine on St. Croix, Minnesota, United States, about 35 kilometers (22 miles) northeast of Minneapolis. The observatory is owned and operated by the University of Minnesota and opened in 1968. It has one telescope, a 0.76-meter (30 in) Cassegrain reflector capable of observing at both optical and infrared wavelengths. It is used for primarily for instruction and instrument testing, and occasionally for research purposes.

== See also ==
- Mount Lemmon Observatory
- List of astronomical observatories
