= Unidentified infrared emission =

The unidentified infrared emission (UIR or UIE) bands are infrared discrete emissions from circumstellar regions, interstellar media, star-forming regions and extragalactic objects for which the identity of the emitting materials is unknown. The main infrared features occur around 3.3, 6.2, 7.7, 8.6, 11.2, and 12.7 μm, although there are many other weak emission features within the ~ 5–19 μm spectral range. In the 1980s, astronomers discovered that the origin of the UIR emission bands is inherent in compounds made of aromatic C–H and C=C chemical bonds, and some went on to hypothesize that the materials responsible should be free-flying polycyclic aromatic hydrocarbon (PAH) molecules. This assignment was based on the observation that the carrier operates far from thermal equilibrium and should therefore be transiently excited by single-photon absorption, which was taken as indicative of a molecule rather than a bulk solid material.

Data recorded with the ESA's Infrared Space Observatory and NASA's Spitzer Space Telescope have suggested that the UIR emission bands arise from compounds that are far more complex in composition and structure than PAH molecules. Moreover, the UIR bands follow a clear evolutionary spectral trend that is linked to the lifespan of the astronomical source; from the time the UIR bands first appear around evolved stars in the protoplanetary nebula stage to evolved stages such as the planetary nebula phase.

It has been suggested that this evolutionary spectral behaviour reflects irradiation-driven modifications through the inclusion of defects in the aromatic carbonaceous material, including the formation of intermediate fullerene-like structures. Increasing curvature and strain may in turn influence carbon bonding vibrational properties and contribute to the observed shifts of the 6.2 μm and 7.7 μm features.

The UIR emission phenomenon is referred by some authors as the aromatic infrared bands (AIBs) and has been studied for more than 40 years.
