= John R. Winckler =

John Randolph Winckler

John Randolph Winckler (October 27, 1916 – February 6, 2001) was an American experimental physicist notable for his discovery of sprites in 1989 and other discoveries in the fields of solar, magnetospheric, auroral, and atmospheric physics. (Note: Attributed to multiple sources:)

He was also notable for designing new methods and apparatus to collect scientific data from high altitude flying objects such as balloons, rockets, and spacecraft. This data collection led Winckler and his staff to major discoveries, such as: discovering that high-energy electrons accompany auroras. Winckler was an advisor to NASA, and a member of the National Academy of Sciences.

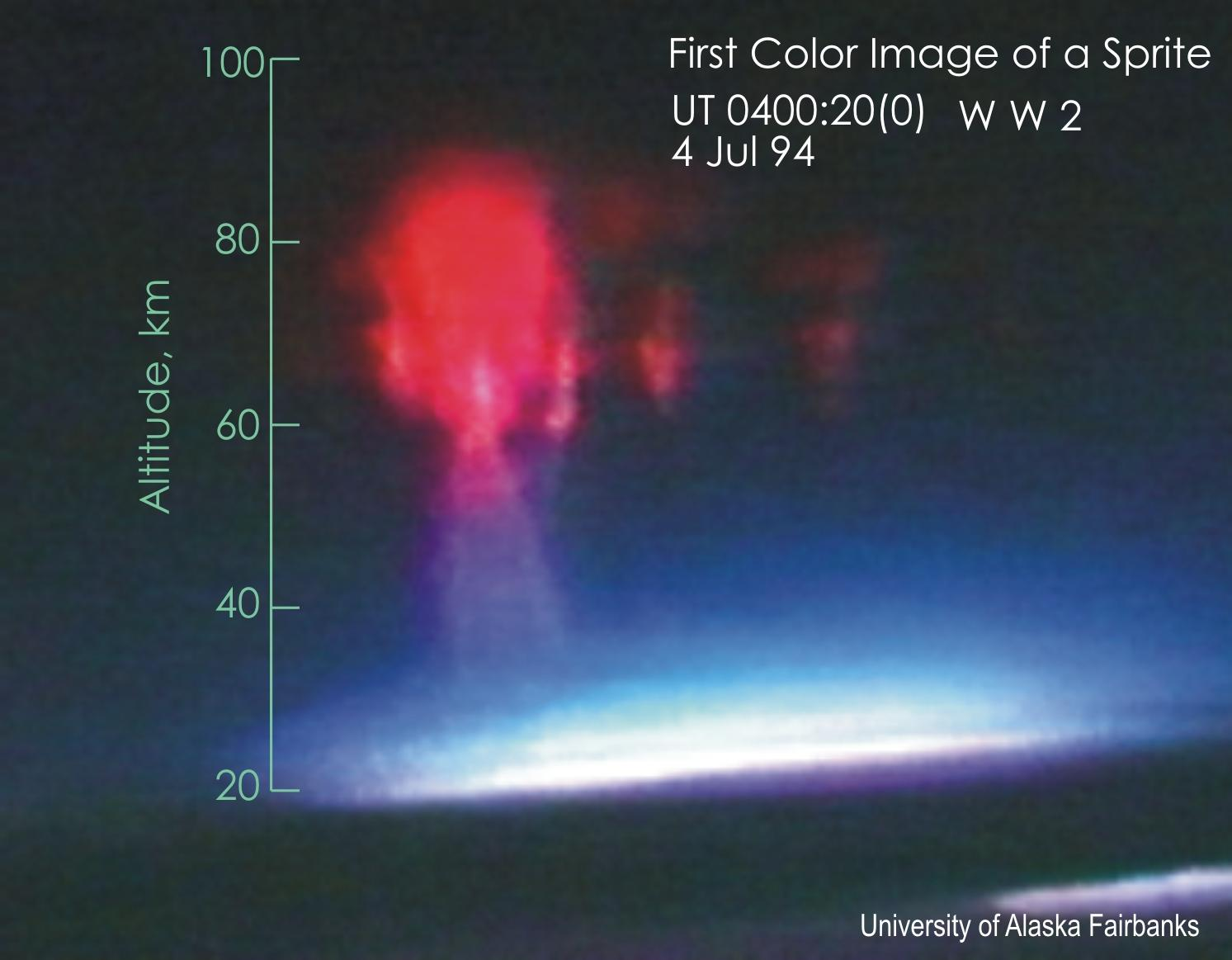
First color image of a sprite, taken from an aircraft.

== Notable awards and distinctions ==
- 1953 Fellow of the American Physical Society
- 1962 American Institute for Aviation and Astronautics, Space Science Award
- 1965-66 Guggenheim fellow, France
- 1972 Doctor honoris causa, Universite Paul Sabatier, Toulouse, France
- 1978 Arctowski Medal, National Academy of Sciences
- 1985 Soviet Geophysical Committee International Geophysical Year Commemorative Medal
- 1991 NASA Medal for Exceptional Scientific Achievement
- 1996 Member, the National Academy of Sciences

== Chronology ==
- October 27, 1916, born, North Plainfield, New Jersey
- 1942: B.S., Rutgers University
- 1946: Ph.D., Princeton University
- 1946: joins faculty of Princeton University
- 1949–1986: University of Minnesota, assistant professor to professor of physics
- 1986–2001: University of Minnesota, emeritus professor of physics
