= List of balloonists =

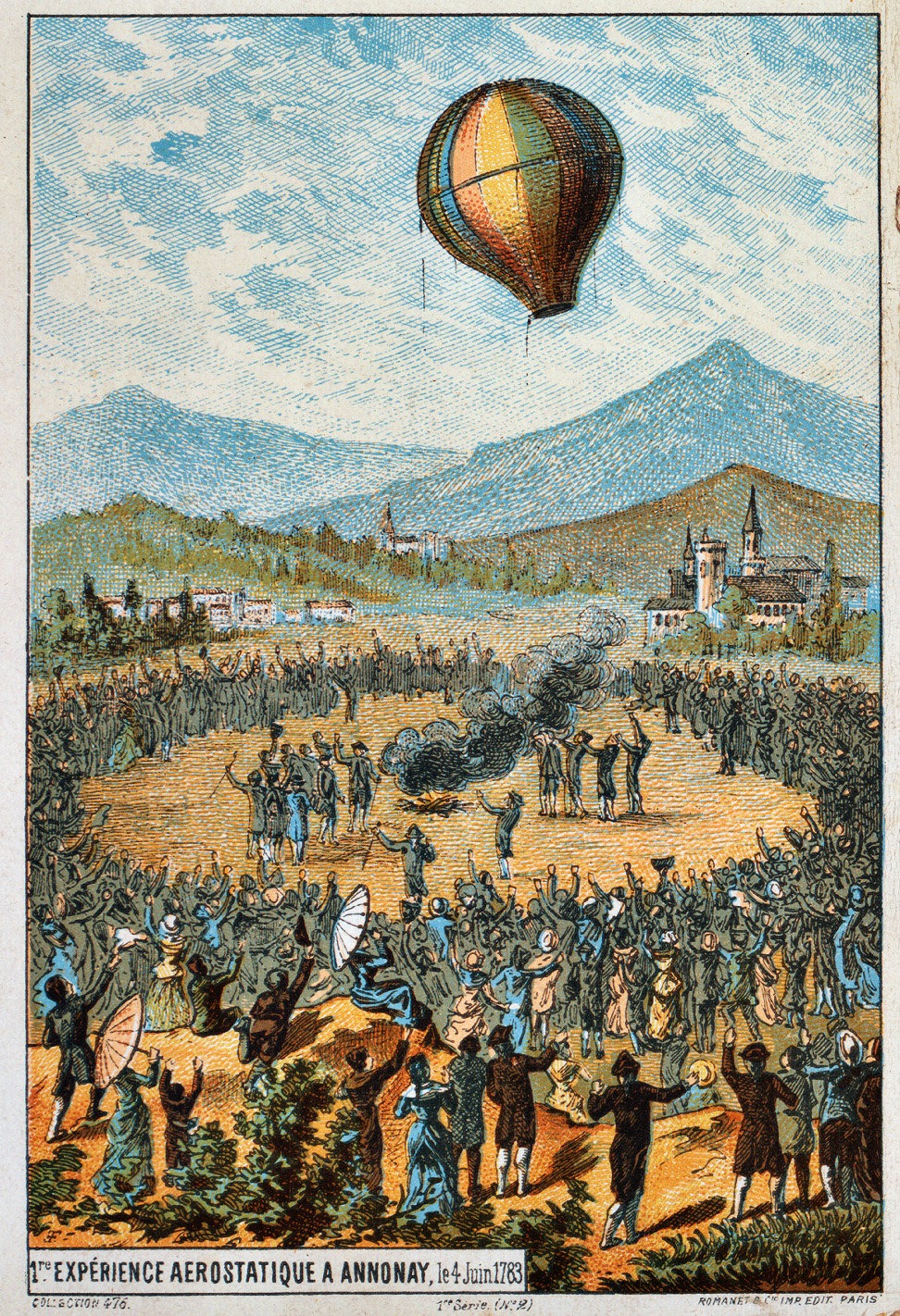
First public demonstration of the Montgolfier brothers balloon.

This is a list of notable balloonists:

- Jean-Pierre Blanchard (French) and John Jeffries (American), first flight across the English Channel, 1785.
- Sophie Blanchard (1778-1819), first professional female balloonist, first woman to pilot her own balloon, received honours from both Napoleon and Louis XVIII
- Mercedes Corominas (1886–1926), first female Spanish balloonist to make a solo ascent, later famed exhibitionist in Portugal and Brazil.
- Alberto Santos-Dumont (1873–1932), Brazilian and one of the very few people to have contributed significantly to the development of both lighter-than-air and heavier-than-air aircraft.
- Francisque Arban (1815-1849), famous for being the first to cross the Alps by balloon in the September of 1849, and for getting lost at sea a month later.
- Steve Fossett (1944–2007), American, first solo non-stop balloon flight around the Earth.
- James Glaisher FRS (1809–1903), English meteorologist, astronomer, and pioneering balloonist, with a world record-breaking ascent in 1862
- David N. Levin (1948–2017), American, only "triple crown pilot"
- J. B. Holmes - (1982), American professional golfer who plays on the PGA Tour. Bronze medal balloonist.
- Joseph-Michel and Jacques-Étienne Montgolfier, French, inventors of the Montgolfière-style hot air balloon
- Jean Pierre Alfred Nadal, Siege of Paris 1870 French balloon aeronautist, 1871 lieutenant magasinier général des aérostiers civils et militaires
- Louise Poitevin (c. 1820–1908), French balloonist, pioneer of aviation
- Letitia Ann Sage (c.1750–1817), first British woman to ascend in a balloon
- James Sadler (balloonist) (1753–1828), first English balloonist
- Élisabeth Thible (1757–c.1784), first female balloonist
- John Wise (1808–1879), American
- Roger Wootton (1944–2017), English
