= Balloon (aeronautics) =

Type of aerostat that remains aloft due to its buoyancy

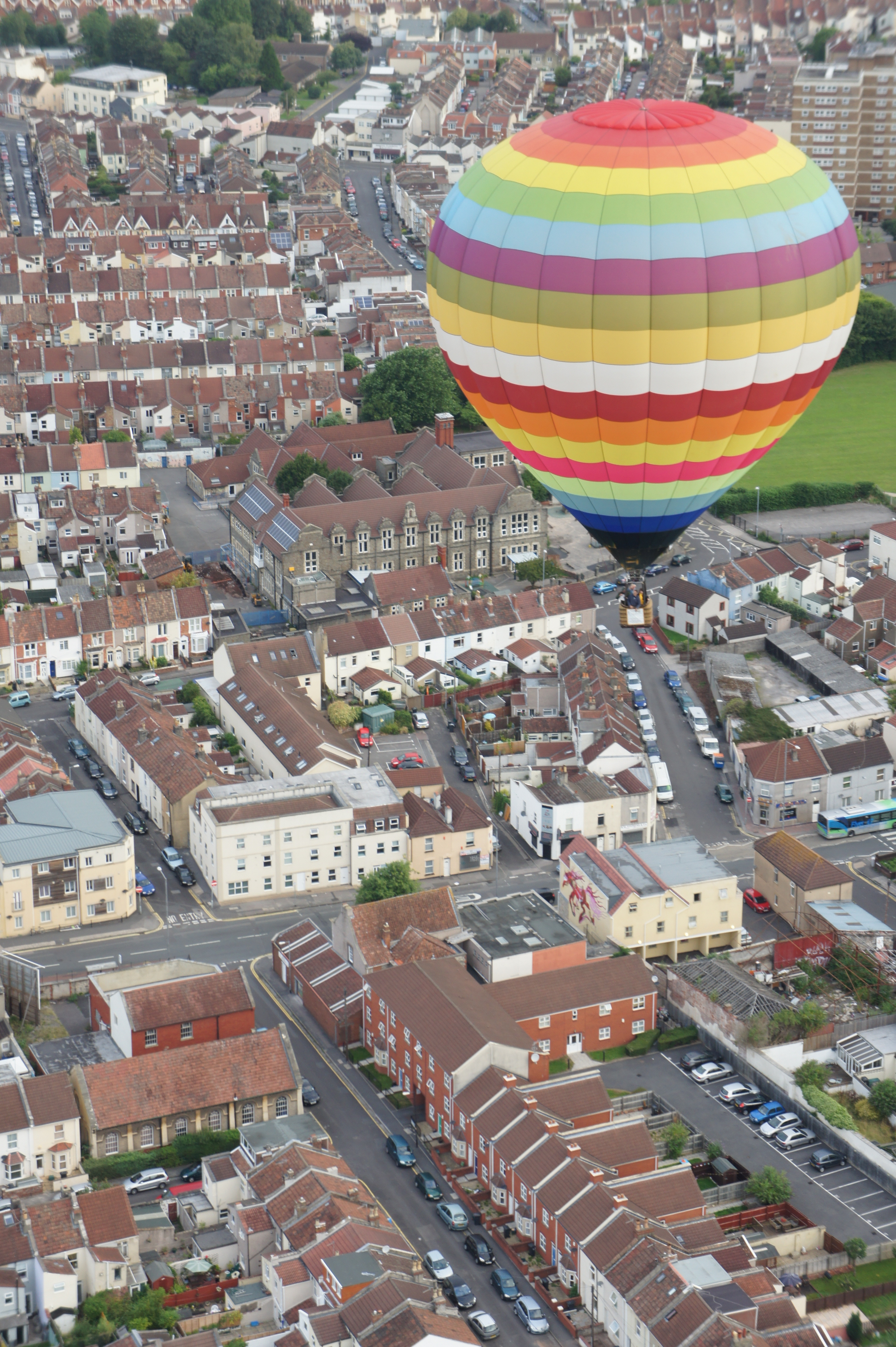
A hot air balloon in flight

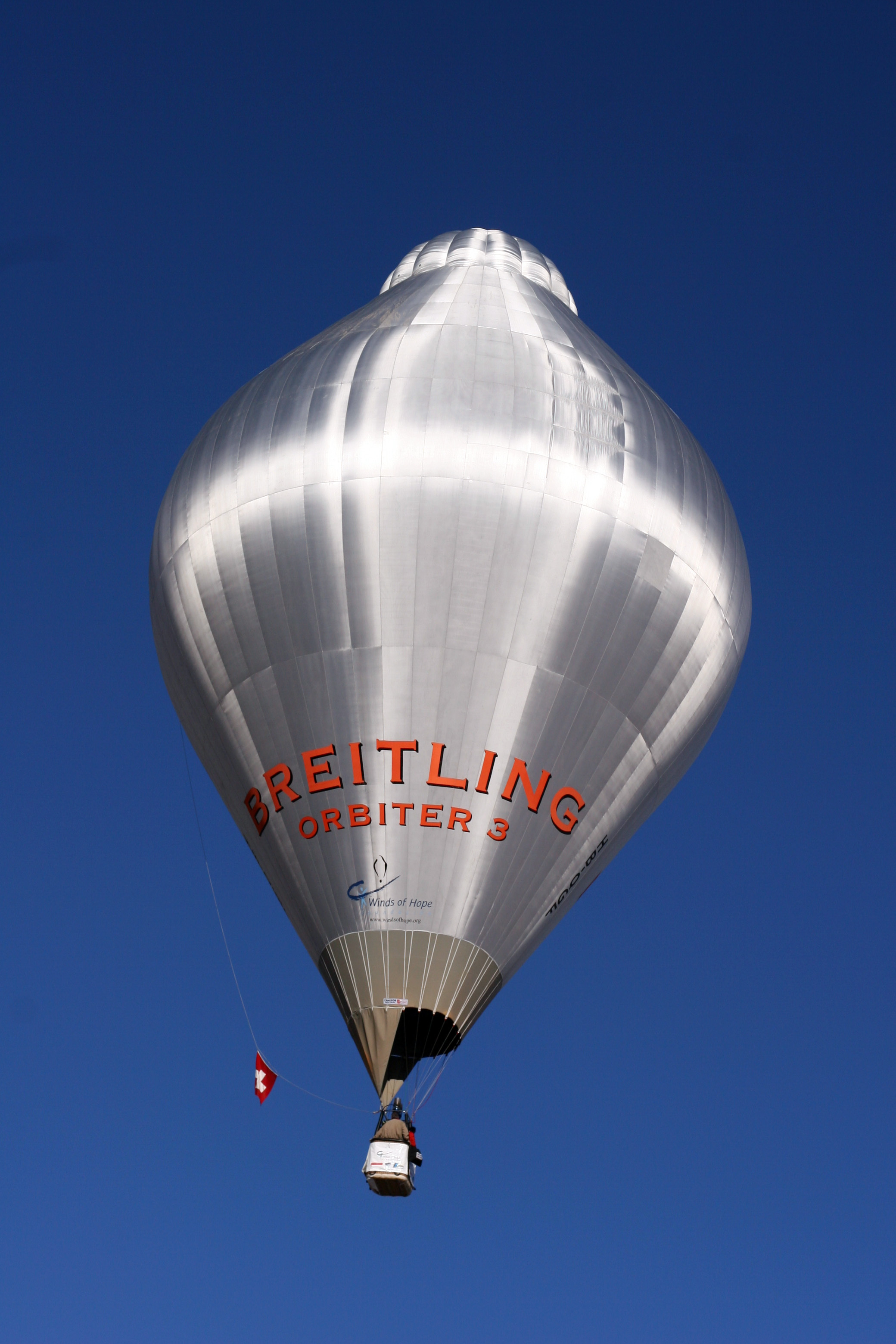
In 1999, Bertrand Piccard and Brian Jones achieved the first non-stop balloon circumnavigation in Breitling Orbiter 3.

In aeronautics, a balloon is an unpowered aerostat, which remains aloft or floats due to its buoyancy. It may use hot air as a lifting gas, or it will use gas that is not air like hydrogen or helium. A balloon may be free, moving with the wind, or tethered to a fixed point. It is distinct from an airship, which is a powered aerostat that can propel itself through the air in a controlled manner.

Many balloons have a basket, gondola, or capsule suspended beneath the main envelope for carrying people or equipment (including cameras and telescopes, and flight-control mechanisms).

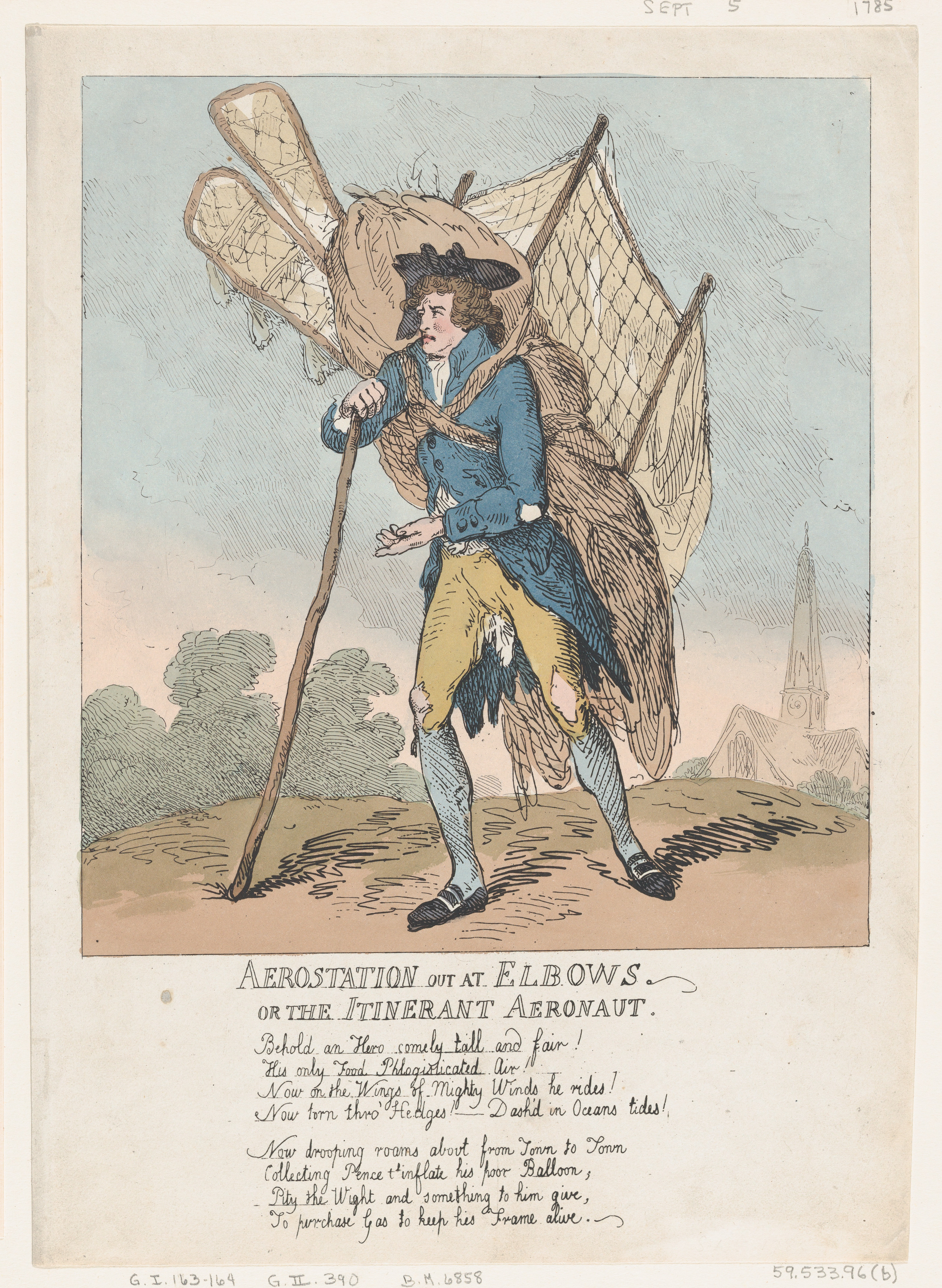
"Aerostation out at Elbows, or The Itinerant Aeronaut" print illustration and poem (1785)

== Principles ==
A balloon is conceptually the simplest of all flying machines. The balloon is a fabric envelope filled with a gas that is lighter than the surrounding atmosphere. As the entire balloon is less dense than its surroundings, it rises, taking along with it a basket, attached underneath, which carries passengers or payload. Although a balloon has no propulsion system, a degree of directional control is possible by making the balloon rise or sink in altitude to find favorable wind directions.

There are three main types of balloons:

- The hot air balloon or Montgolfière obtains its buoyancy by heating the air inside the balloon; it has become the most common type.
- The gas balloon or Charlière is inflated with a gas of lower molecular weight than the ambient atmosphere; most gas balloons operate with the internal pressure of the gas the same as the pressure of the surrounding atmosphere; a superpressure balloon can operate with the lifting gas at pressure that exceeds that of the surrounding air, with the objective of limiting or eliminating the loss of gas from day-time heating; gas balloons are filled with gases such as:
  - hydrogen – originally used extensively but, since the Hindenburg disaster, is now seldom used due to its high flammability;
  - coal gas – although giving around half the lift of hydrogen, extensively used during the nineteenth and early twentieth century, since it was cheaper than hydrogen and readily available;
  - helium – used today for all airships and most manned gas balloons;
  - other gases have included ammonia and methane, but these have poor lifting capacity and other safety defects and have never been widely used.
- The Rozière type has both heated and unheated lifting gases in separate gasbags. This type of balloon is sometimes used for long-distance record flights, such as the recent circumnavigations, but is not otherwise in use.

Both the hot air, or Montgolfière, balloon and the gas balloon are still in common use. Montgolfière balloons are relatively inexpensive, as they do not require high-grade materials for their envelopes, and they are popular for balloonist sport activity.

=== Hot air balloons ===
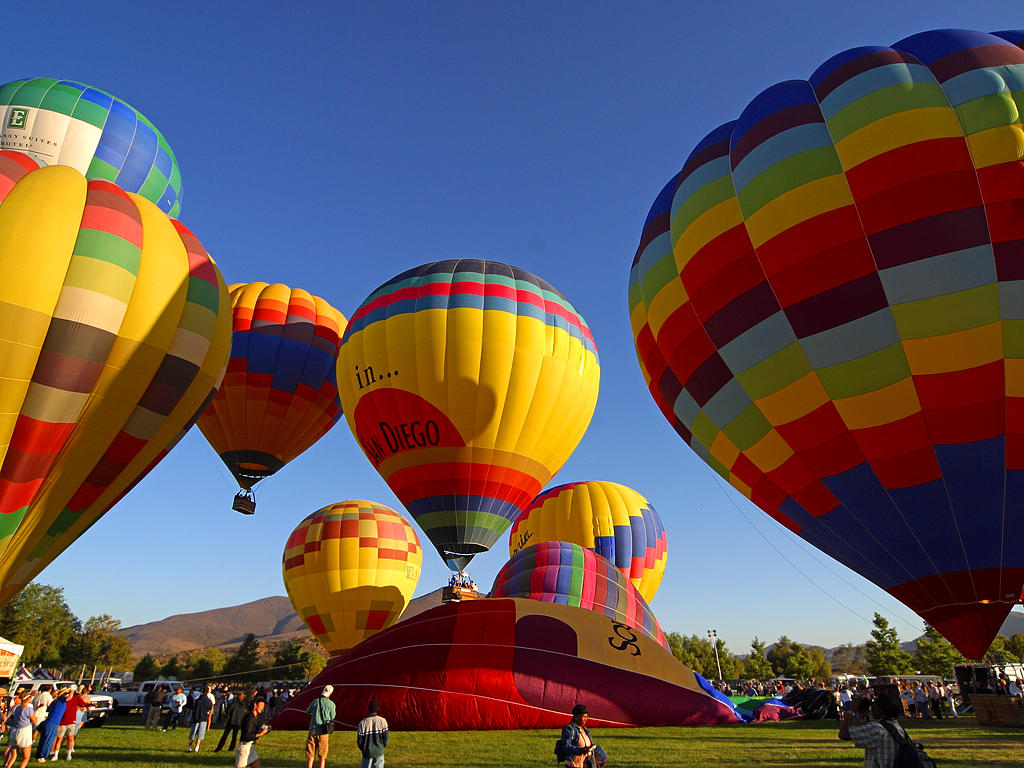
Hot air balloons, San Diego

Hot air balloon taking off

The first balloon which carried passengers used hot air to obtain buoyancy and was built by the brothers Joseph and Etienne Montgolfier in Annonay, France in 1783: the first passenger flight was 19 September 1783, carrying a sheep, a duck, and a rooster.

The first tethered manned balloon flight was by a larger Montgolfier balloon, probably on 15 October 1783. The first free balloon flight was by the same Montgolfier balloon on 21 November 1783.

When heated, air expands, so a given volume of space contains less air. This makes it lighter and, if its lifting power is greater than the weight of the balloon containing it, it will lift the balloon upwards. A hot air balloon can only stay up while it has fuel for its burner, to keep the air hot enough.

The Montgolfiers' early hot air balloons used a solid-fuel brazier which proved less practical than the hydrogen balloons that had followed almost immediately, and hot air ballooning soon died out.

In the 1950s, the convenience and low cost of bottled gas burners led to a revival of hot air ballooning for sport and leisure.

The height or altitude of a hot air balloon is controlled by turning the burner up or down as needed, unlike a gas balloon where ballast weights are often carried so that they can be dropped if the balloon gets too low, and in order to land some lifting gas must be vented through a valve.

=== Gas balloons ===
A man-carrying balloon using the light gas hydrogen for buoyancy was made by Professor Jacques Charles and flown less than a month after the Montgolfier flight, on 1 December 1783. Gas balloons have greater lift for a given volume, so they do not need to be so large, and they can also stay up for much longer than hot air, so gas balloons dominated ballooning for the next 200 years. In the 19th century, it was common to use manufactured town gas (coal gas) to fill balloons; this was not as light as pure hydrogen gas, having about half the lifting power, but it was much cheaper and readily available.

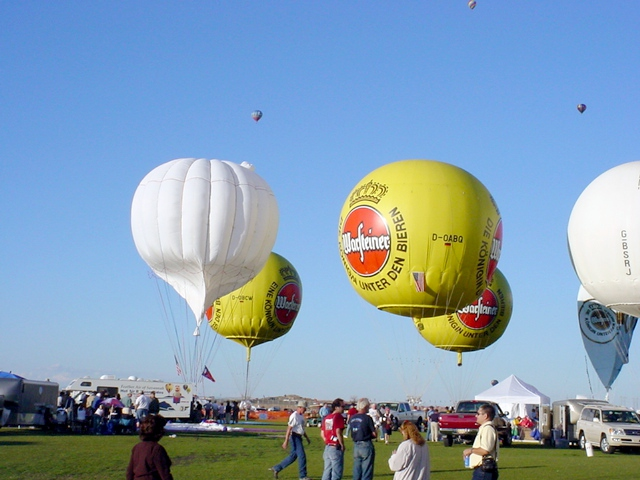
Gas balloons at the Albuquerque International Balloon Fiesta

Light gas balloons are predominant in scientific applications, as they are capable of reaching much higher altitudes for much longer periods of time. They are generally filled with helium. Although hydrogen has more lifting power, it is explosive in an atmosphere rich in oxygen. With a few exceptions, scientific balloon missions are unmanned.

There are two types of light-gas balloons: zero-pressure and superpressure. Zero-pressure balloons are the traditional form of light-gas balloon. They are partially inflated with the light gas before launch, with the gas pressure the same both inside and outside the balloon. As the zero-pressure balloon rises, its gas expands to maintain the zero pressure difference, and the balloon's envelope swells.

At night, the gas in a zero-pressure balloon cools and contracts, causing the balloon to sink. A zero-pressure balloon can only maintain altitude by releasing gas when it goes too high, where the expanding gas can threaten to rupture the envelope, or releasing ballast when it sinks too low. Loss of gas and ballast limits the endurance of zero-pressure balloons to a few days.

A superpressure balloon, in contrast, has a tough and inelastic envelope that is filled with light gas to pressure higher than that of the external atmosphere, and then sealed. The superpressure balloon cannot change size greatly, and so maintains a generally constant volume. The superpressure balloon maintains an altitude of constant density in the atmosphere, and can maintain flight until gas leakage gradually brings it down.

Superpressure balloons offer flight endurance of months, rather than days. In fact, in typical operation an Earth-based superpressure balloon mission is ended by a command from ground control to open the envelope, rather than by natural leakage of gas.

High-altitude balloons are used as high flying vessels to carry scientific instruments (like weather balloons), or reach near-space altitudes to take footage or photos of the earth. These balloons can fly over 100,000 feet (30.5 km) into the air, and are designed to burst at a set altitude where the parachute will deploy to safely carry the payload back to earth.

Cluster ballooning uses many smaller gas-filled balloons for flight.

=== Combination balloons ===
Early hot air balloons could not stay up for very long because they used a lot of fuel, while early hydrogen balloons were difficult to take higher or lower as desired because the aeronaut could only vent the gas or drop off ballast a limited number of times. Pilâtre de Rozier realised that for a long-distance flight such as crossing the English Channel, the aeronaut would need to make use of the differing wind directions at different altitudes. It would be essential therefore to have good control of altitude while still able to stay up for a long time. He developed a combination balloon having two gas bags, the Rozier balloon. The upper one held hydrogen and provided most of the steady lift. The lower one held hot air and could be quickly heated or cooled to provide the varying lift for good altitude control.

In 1785 Pilâtre de Rozier took off in an attempt to fly across the Channel, but shortly into the flight the hydrogen gas bag caught fire and de Rozier did not survive the ensuing accident. This earned de Rozier the title "The First to Fly and the First to Die".

It wasn't until the 1980s that technology was developed to allow safe operation of the Rozier type, for example by using non-flammable helium as the lifting gas, and several designs have successfully undertaken long-distance flights.

=== Tethering and kite balloons ===
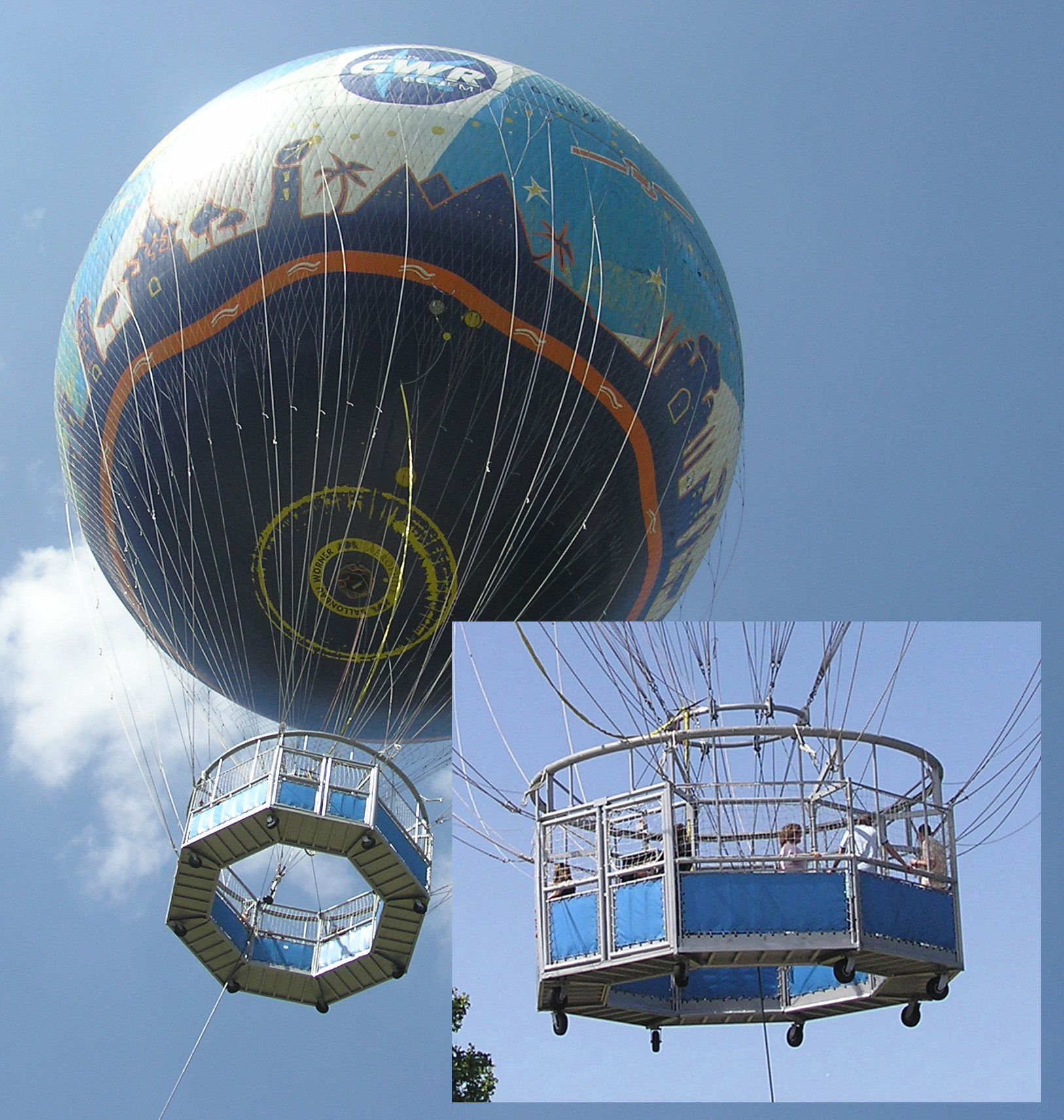
A tethered helium balloon gives the public rides to 500 feet (150 m) above the city of Bristol, England. The inset shows detail of the gondola.

As an alternative to free flight, a balloon may be tethered to allow reliable take off and landing at the same location. Some of the earliest balloon flights were tethered for safety, and since then balloons have been tethered for many purposes, including military observation and aerial barrage, meteorological and commercial uses.

The natural spherical shape of a balloon is unstable in high winds. Tethered balloons for use in windy conditions are often stabilised by aerodynamic shaping and connecting to the tether by a halter arrangement. These are called kite balloons.

A kite balloon is distinct from a kytoon, which obtains a portion of its lift aerodynamically.

== History ==
=== Antecedents ===
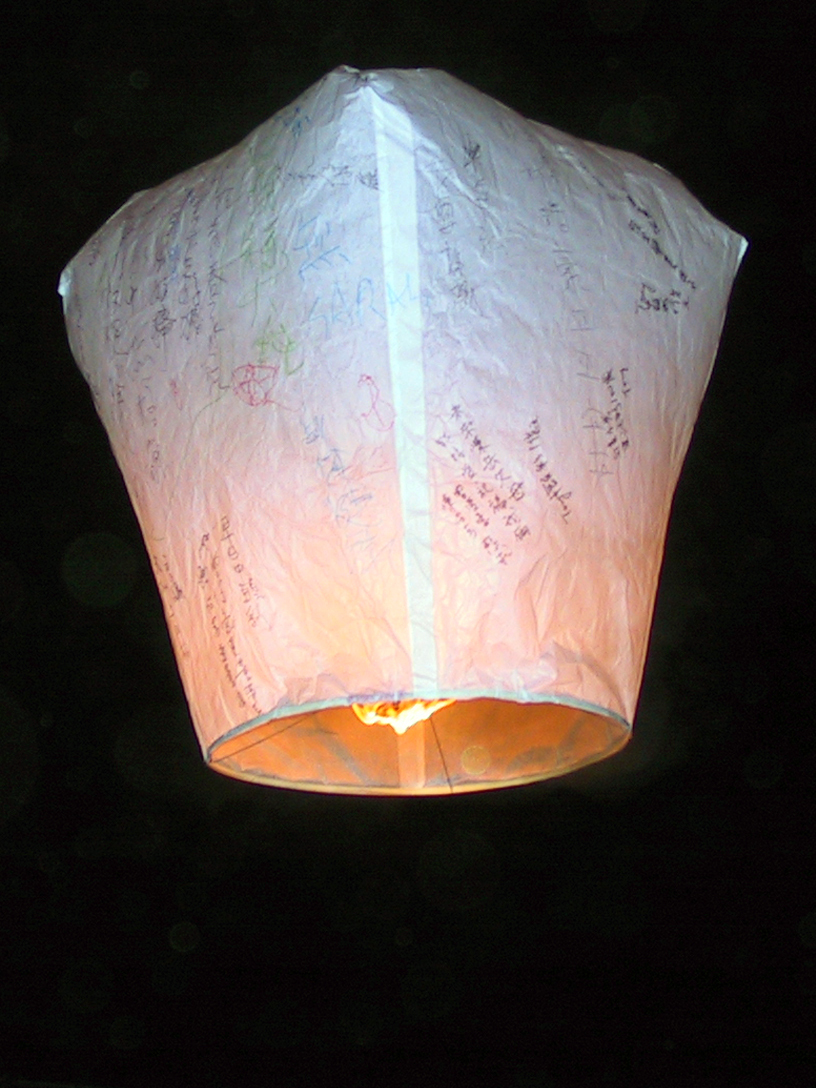
A modern Kongming Lantern

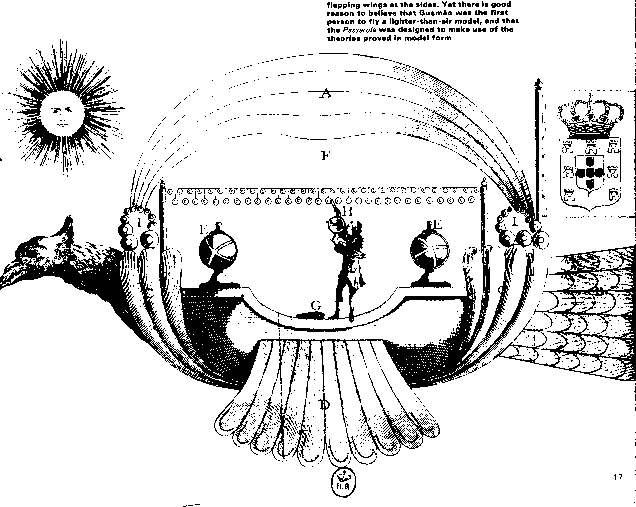
Bartolomeu de Gusmão's prototype airship Passarola devised 1709.

Unmanned hot air balloons are mentioned in Chinese history. Zhuge Liang of the Shu Han kingdom, in the Three Kingdoms era (220–280 AD) used airborne lanterns for military signaling. These lanterns are known as Kongming lanterns (Kǒngmíng dēng 孔明灯). The Mongolian army learned of the Kongming lantern from the Chinese and used it in Battle of Legnica during the Mongol invasion of Poland. In his work „Il volare non e imposible come fin hora universalmente e stato creduto” ("Flying is Not Impossible, as was commonly believed until now"), the Polish nobleman and scientist Tytus Boratyni presented the concept of flight using a gas lighter than air. In 1709 the Brazilian-Portuguese cleric Bartolomeu de Gusmão made a balloon filled with heated air rise inside a room in Lisbon. On August 8, 1709, in Lisbon, Gusmão managed to lift a small balloon made of paper with hot air about four meters in front of king John V and the Portuguese court He also claimed to have built a balloon named Passarola (Big bird) and attempted to lift himself from Saint George Castle in Lisbon, landing about one kilometre away. However the claim of this feat remains uncertain, even though there is record of this flight in the source used by the FAI the exact distance and conditions of the flight are not confirmed.

=== The first modern balloons ===
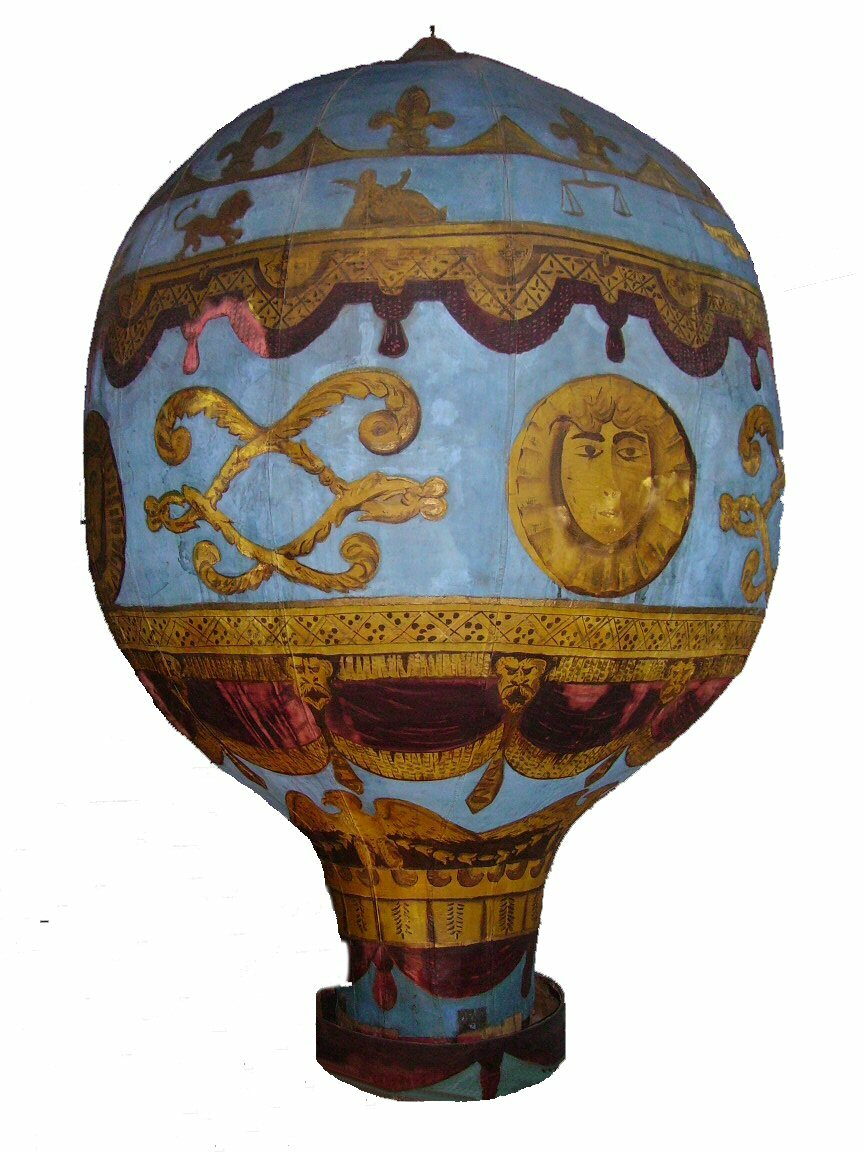
A model of the Montgolfier brothers balloon at the London Science Museum

Following Henry Cavendish's 1766 work on hydrogen, Joseph Black proposed that a balloon filled with hydrogen would be able to rise in the air.

The first recorded manned flight was made in a hot air balloon built by the Montgolfier brothers on 21 November 1783. The flight started in Paris and reached a height of 500 feet or so. The pilots, Jean-François Pilâtre de Rozier and François Laurent d'Arlandes, covered about 5.5 miles (8.9 km) in 25 minutes.

On 1 December 1783, Professor Jacques Charles and the Robert brothers made the first gas balloon flight, also from Paris. Their hydrogen-filled balloon flew to almost 2,000 feet (600 m), stayed aloft for over 2 hours and covered a distance of 27 miles (43 km), landing in the small town of Nesles-la-Vallée.

The first Italian balloon ascent was made by Count Paolo Andreani and two other passengers in a balloon designed and constructed by the three Gerli brothers, on 25 February 1784. A public demonstration occurred in Brugherio a few days later, on 13 March 1784, when the vehicle flew to a height of 1,537 metres (5,043 ft) and a distance of 8 kilometres (5.0 mi). On 28 March Andreani received a standing ovation at La Scala, and later a medal from Joseph II, Holy Roman Emperor.

De Rozier, together with Joseph Proust, took part in a further flight on 23 June 1784, in a modified version of the Montgolfiers' first balloon christened La Marie-Antoinette after the Queen. They took off in front of the King of France and King Gustav III of Sweden. The balloon flew north at an altitude of approximately 3,000 metres, above the clouds, travelling 52 km in 45 minutes before cold and turbulence forced them to descend past Luzarches, between Coye et Orry-la-Ville, near the Chantilly forest.

The first balloon ascent in Britain was made by James Tytler on 25 August 1784 at Edinburgh, Scotland, in a hot air balloon.

The first aircraft disaster occurred in May 1785 when the town of Tullamore, County Offaly, Ireland was seriously damaged when the crash of a balloon resulted in a fire that burned down about 100 houses, making the town home to the world's first aviation disaster. To this day, the town shield depicts a phoenix rising from the ashes.

Several early works about ballooning were published following these early flights, using the now obsolete term aerostation to refer the construction, operation, and navigation of balloons. Tiberius Cavallo's The History and Practice of Aerostation was published in 1785. Dramatist Frederick Pilon wrote a play called Aerostation in 1785. Other books were published on the subject, also referring to it as aerostation, including by Monck Mason.

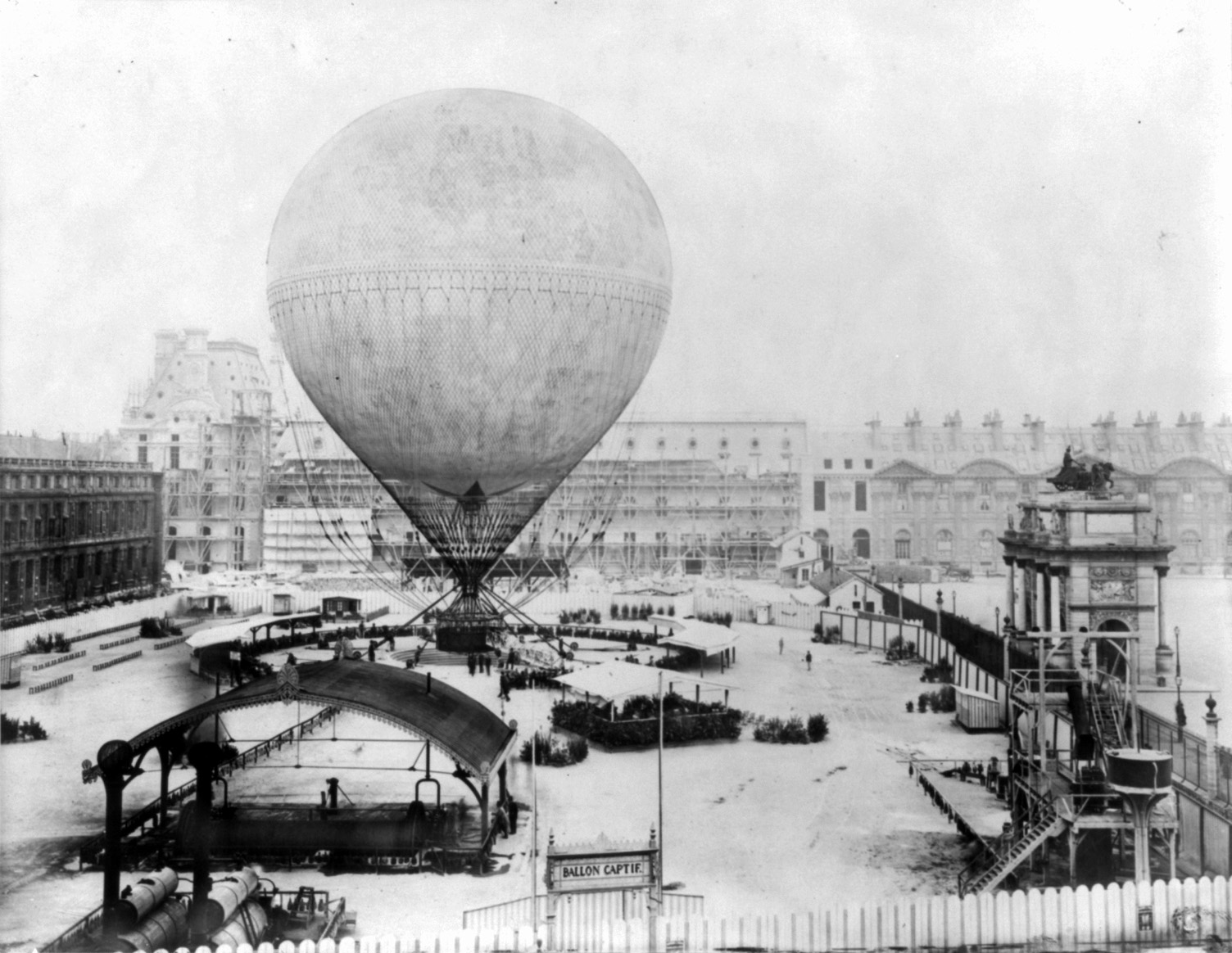
Henri Giffard's tethered passenger balloon prior to an ascent from Tuilerie Garden in 1878.

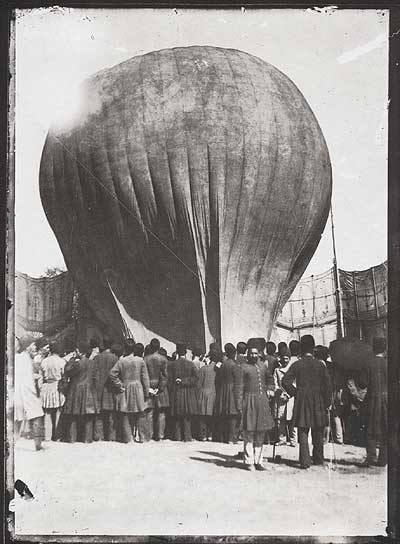
Balloon landing in Mashgh square, Iran (Persia), at the time of Nasser al-Din Shah Qajar, around 1850.

Jean-Pierre Blanchard went on to make the first manned flight of a balloon in America on 9 January 1793, after touring Europe to set the record for the first balloon flight in countries including the Austrian Netherlands, Germany, the Netherlands and Poland. His hydrogen filled balloon took off from a prison yard in Philadelphia, Pennsylvania. The flight reached 5,800 feet (1,770 m) and landed in Gloucester County, New Jersey. President George Washington was among the guests observing the takeoff. Sophie Blanchard, married to Jean-Pierre, was the first woman to pilot her own balloon and the first woman to adopt ballooning as a career.

On 29 September 1804, Abraham Hopman became the first Dutchman to make a successful balloon flight in the Netherlands.

Gas balloons became the most common type from the 1790s until the 1960s. The French military observation balloon L'Intrépide of 1795 is the oldest preserved aircraft in Europe; it is on display in the Heeresgeschichtliches Museum in Vienna. Jules Verne wrote a short, non-fiction story, published in 1852, about being stranded aboard a hydrogen balloon.

The earliest successful balloon flight recorded in Australia was by William Dean in 1858. His balloon was gas-filled and travelled 30 km with two people aboard. On 5 January 1870, T. Gale, made an ascent from the Domain in Sydney. His balloon was 17 metres in length by 31 metres in circumference and his ascent, with him seated on the netting, took him about a mile before he landed in Glebe.

Henri Giffard also developed a tethered balloon for passengers in 1878 in the Tuileries Garden in Paris. The first tethered balloon in modern times was made in France at Chantilly Castle in 1994 by Aerophile SA.

Ballooning developed as a leisure activity. It was given a significant boost when Charles Green discovered that readily-available coal gas, then coming into urban use, gave half the lifting power of hydrogen, which had to be specially manufactured. In 1836 Green made an almost 500 mile long-distance flight from London, England to Weilberg in Germany.

=== Military use ===
The first military use of a balloon was at the Battle of Fleurus in 1794, when L'Entreprenant was used by the French Aerostatic Corps to watch the movements of the enemy. On 2 April 1794, an aeronauts corps was created in the French army; however, given the logistical problems linked with the production of hydrogen on the battlefield (it required constructing ovens and pouring water on white-hot iron), the corps was disbanded in 1799.

The first major use of balloons in the military occurred during the American Civil War with the Union Army Balloon Corps established in 1861.

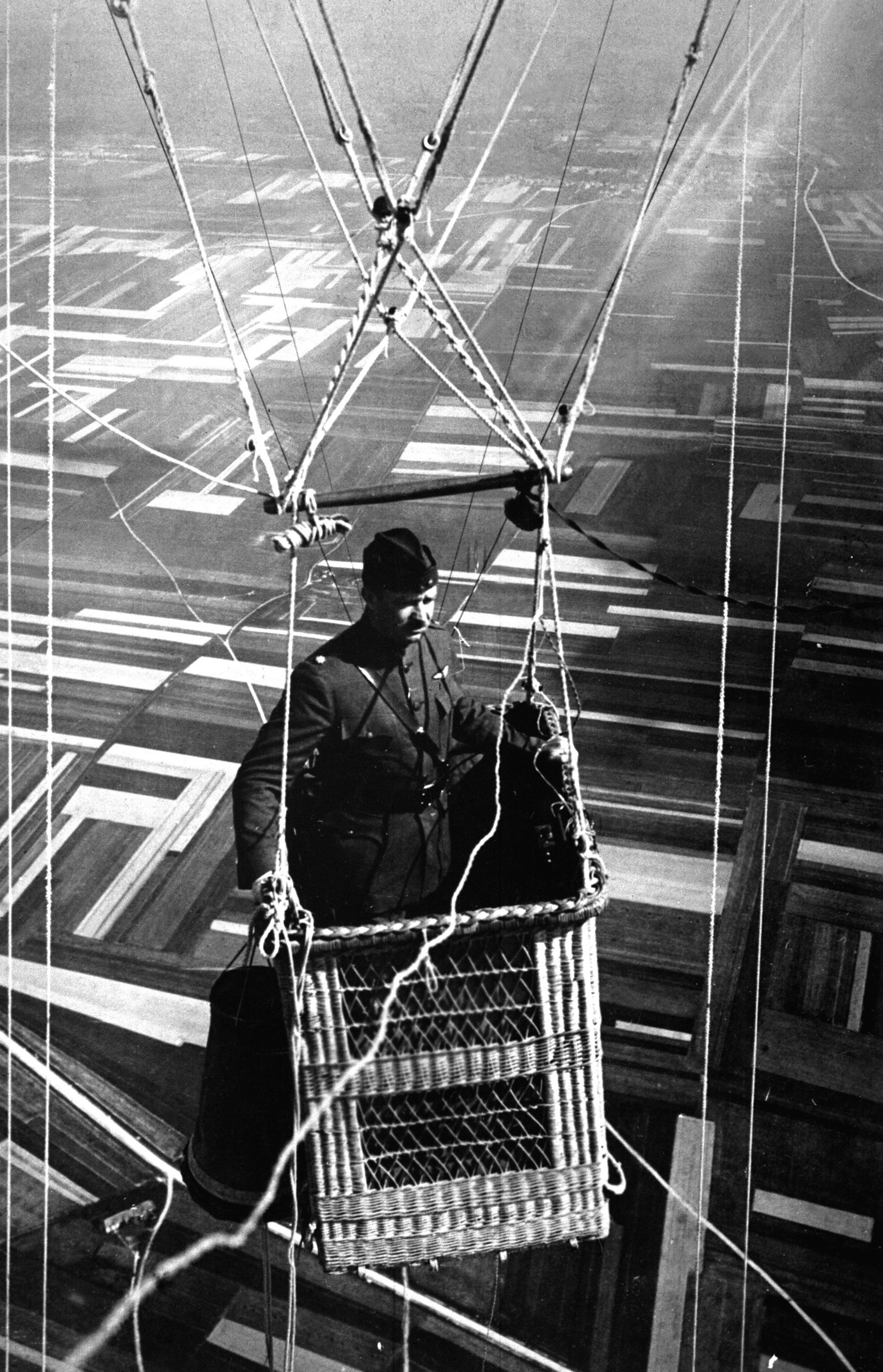
Close-up view of an American major in the basket of an observation balloon flying over territory near front lines during World War I.

During the Paraguayan War (1864–70), observation balloons were used by the Brazilian Army.

Balloons were used by the British Royal Engineers in 1885 for reconnaissance and observation purposes during the Bechuanaland Expedition and the Sudan Expedition. Although experiments in Britain had been conducted as early as 1863, a School of Ballooning was not established at Chatham, Medway, Kent until 1888. During the Anglo-Boer War (1899–1902), use was made of observation balloons. A 11,500 cubic feet (330 m^{3}) balloon was kept inflated for 22 days and marched 165 miles into the Transvaal with the British forces.

Hydrogen-filled balloons were widely used during World War I (1914–1918) to detect enemy troop movements and to direct artillery fire. Observers phoned their reports to officers on the ground who then relayed the information to those who needed it. Balloons were frequently targets of opposing aircraft. Planes assigned to attack enemy balloons were often equipped with incendiary bullets, for the purpose of igniting the hydrogen.

The Aeronaut Badge was established by the United States Army in World War I to denote service members who were qualified balloon pilots. Observation balloons were retained well after the Great War, being used in the Russo-Finnish Wars, the Winter War of 1939–40, and the Continuation War of 1941–45.

During World War II the Japanese launched thousands of hydrogen "fire balloons" against the United States and Canada. In Operation Outward the British used balloons to carry incendiaries to Nazi Germany. During 2018, incendiary balloons and kites were launched from Gaza at Israel, burning some 12,000 dunams (3,000 acres) in Israel.

Large helium balloons are used by the South Korean government and private activists advocating freedom in North Korea. They float hundreds of kilometers across the border carrying news from the outside world, illegal radios, foreign currency and gifts of personal hygiene supplies. A North Korean military official has described it as "psychological warfare" and threatened to attack South Korea if their release continued.

=== Hot air balloons return ===
Ed Yost redesigned the hot air balloon in the late 1950s using rip-stop nylon fabrics and high-powered propane burners to create the modern hot air balloon. His first flight of such a balloon, lasting 25 minutes and covering 3 miles (5 km), occurred on 22 October 1960 in Bruning, Nebraska. Yost's improved design for hot air balloons triggered the modern sport balloon movement. Today, hot air balloons are much more common than gas balloons.

In the late 1970s the British hot air balloonist Julian Nott constructed a hot air balloon using technologies he believed would have been available to the Nazca culture of Peru some 1500 to 2000 years earlier, and demonstrated that it could fly. and again in 2003, Nott has speculated that the Nazca might have used it as a tool for designing the Nazca Lines. Nott also pioneered the use of hybrid energy, where solar power is a significant heat source, and in 1981 he crossed the English Channel.

== Modern ballooning ==
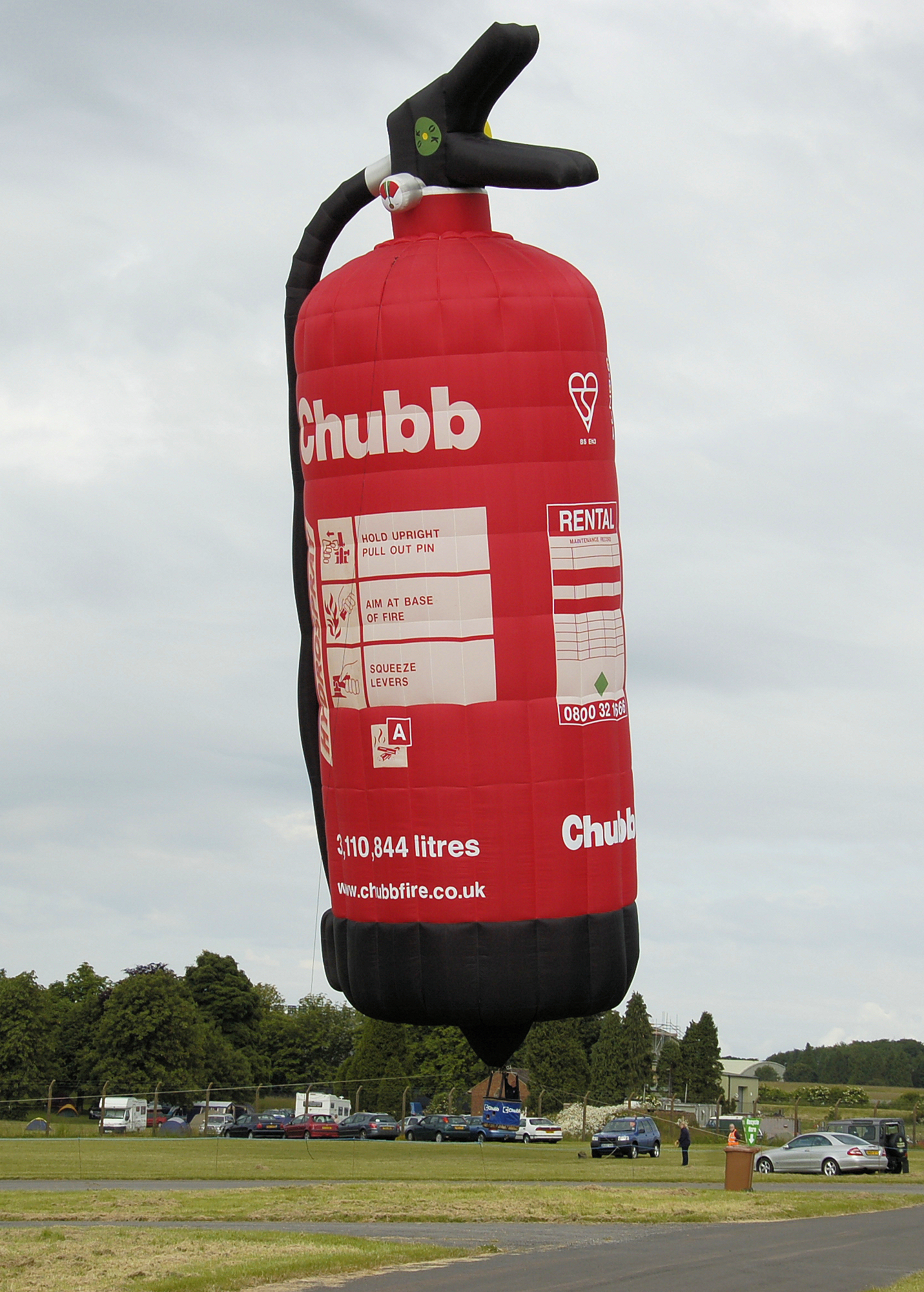
A special-shape hot air balloon – Chubb fire extinguisher

In 2012, the Red Bull Stratos balloon took Felix Baumgartner to 128,100 ft. for a freefall jump from the stratosphere.

=== Commercial ===
Tethered gas balloons have been installed as amusement rides in Paris since 1999, in Berlin since 2000, in Disneyland Paris since 2005, in the San Diego Wild Animal Park since 2005, in Walt Disney World in Orlando since 2009, and the DHL Balloon in Singapore in 2006. Modern tethered gas balloons are made by Aerophile SAS.

Hot air balloons used in sport flying are sometimes made in special designs to advertise a company or product, such as the Chubb fire extinguisher illustrated.

=== Astronautics ===
==== Balloon satellites ====
A balloon in space uses internal gas pressure only to maintain its shape.

The Echo satellite was a balloon satellite launched into Earth orbit in 1960 and used for passive relay of radio communication. PAGEOS was launched in 1966 for worldwide satellite triangulation, allowing for greater precision in the calculation of different locations on the planet's surface.

==== Planetary probes ====
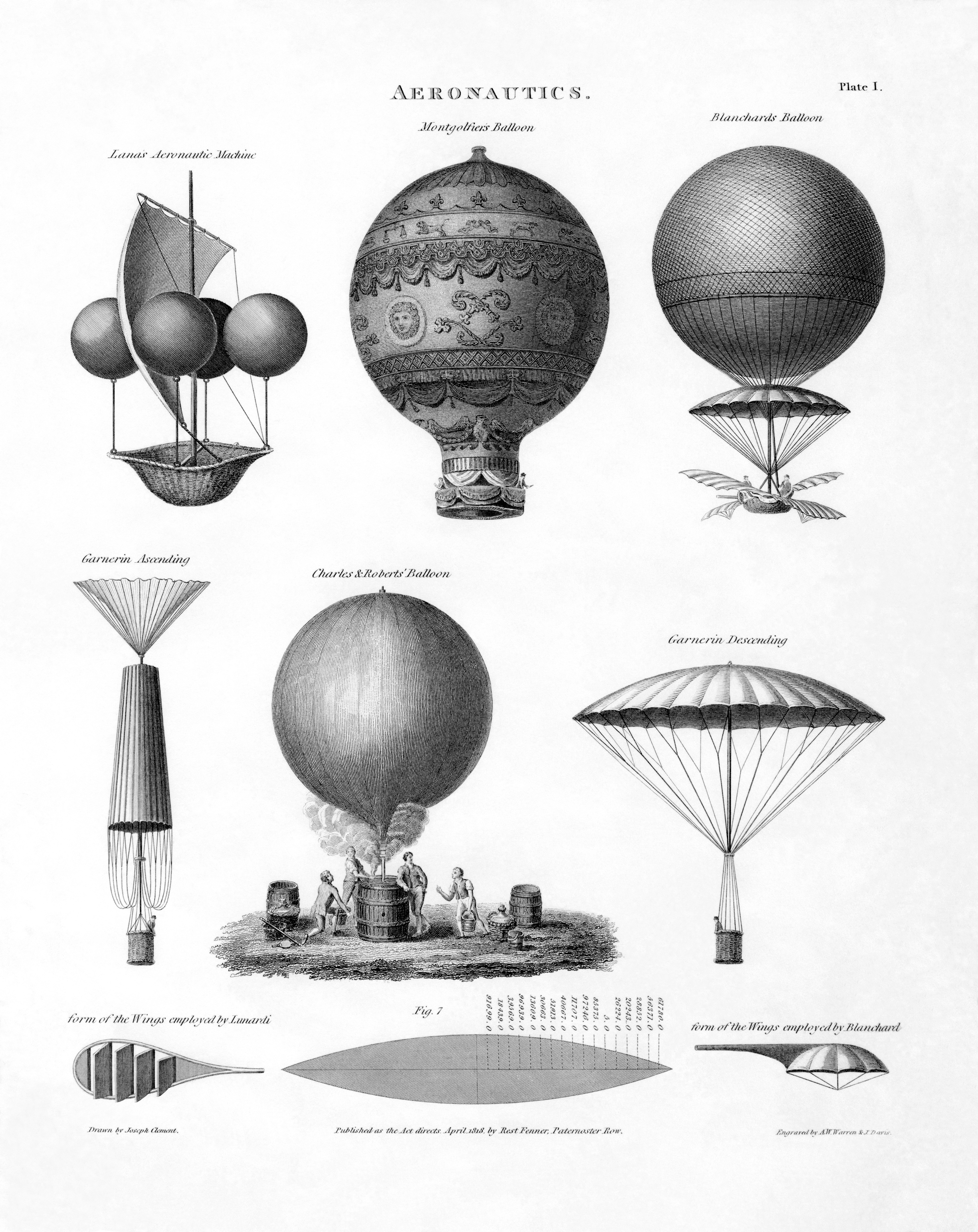
Lana's aeronautic machine

In 1984, the Soviet space probes Vega 1 and Vega 2 released two balloons with scientific experiments in the atmosphere of Venus. They transmitted signals for two days to Earth.

== Ballooning records ==
On 19 October 1910, Alan Hawley and Augustus Post landed in the wilderness of Quebec, Canada after traveling for 48 hours and 1887.6 kilometers (1,173 mi) from St. Louis during the Gordon Bennett International Balloon Race, setting a distance record that held for more than 20 years. It took the men a week to hike out of the woods, during which time search parties had been mobilized and many had taken the pair for dead.

On 13 December 1913 through 17 December 1913 Hugo Kaulen stayed aloft for 87 hours. His record lasted until 1976.

On 27 May 1931, Auguste Piccard and Paul Kipfer became the first to reach the stratosphere in a balloon.

On 31 August 1933, Alexander Dahl took the first picture of the Earth's curvature in an open hydrogen gas balloon.

The helium-filled Explorer II balloon, piloted by US Army Air Corps officers Capt. Orvil A. Anderson, Maj. William E. Kepner and Capt. Albert W. Stevens, reached a new record height of 22,066 m (72,395 ft) on 11 November 1935. This followed the same crew's previous near-fatal plunge in July 1934 in a predecessor craft, Explorer, after its canopy ruptured just 190 m (624 ft) short (it transpired) of the then-current altitude record of 22,000 m (72,178 ft) set by the Soviet balloon Osoaviakhim-1.

In 1976, Ed Yost set 13 aviation world's records for distance traveled and amount of time aloft in his attempt to cross the Atlantic Ocean —solo— by balloon (3.938 km, 107:37 h).

In 1978, Ben Abruzzo and his team became the first to cross the Pacific Ocean in a hot air balloon.

The current absolute altitude record for manned balloon flight was set at 34,668 m (113,739 ft) on 4 May 1961 by Malcolm Ross and Victor Prather in the Strato-Lab V balloon payload launched from the deck of the USS Antietam in the Gulf of Mexico. (Note: 4 May 1961 FAI Absolute Altitude (#2325) record for balloon flight set by Malcolm Ross and Victor Prather is still current, as it requires the balloonist to descend with the balloon. The succeeding altitude records were set by parachutists who either separated from or abandoned the balloon at the flight ceiling.)

The previous record altitude for a manned balloon was set at 38,960.5 m (127,823 ft) by Felix Baumgartner in the Red Bull Stratos balloon launched from Roswell, New Mexico on Sunday, 14 October 2012.

The current record altitude for a manned balloon was set at 41,419.0 m (135,889.108 ft) by Alan Eustace on 24 October 2014 as part of the StratEx Space Dive project.

On 1 March 1999 Bertrand Piccard and Brian Jones set off in the balloon Breitling Orbiter 3 from Château d'Oex in Switzerland on the first non-stop balloon circumnavigation around the globe. They landed in Egypt after a 40,814 km (25,361 mi) flight lasting 19 days, 21 hours and 55 minutes.

The altitude record for an unmanned balloon is 53.0 kilometres (173,882 ft) in the mesosphere, reached with a volume of 60,000 cubic metres. The balloon was launched by JAXA on 25 May 2002 from Iwate Prefecture, Japan. This is the greatest height ever obtained by an atmospheric vehicle. Only rockets, rocket planes, and ballistic projectiles have flown higher.

In 2015, the two pilots Leonid Tiukhtyaev and Troy Bradley arrived safely in Baja California, Mexico after a journey of 10,711 km. The two men, originally from Russia and the United States of America respectively, started in Japan and flew with a helium balloon over the Pacific. In 160 hours, the balloon named "Two Eagles" arrived in Mexico, which is new distance and duration records for straight gas balloons.

== See also ==
- Aerostat
- Balloon release
- Balloon-carried light effect
- Blimp
- Ceiling balloon
- Early flying machines
- Hopper balloon
- Lane hydrogen producer
- Flight altitude record
- List of balloonists
- List of civil aviation authorities
- List of firsts in aviation
- List of inflatable manufactured goods
- Project Manhigh
- QinetiQ 1
- Research balloon
- Skyhook balloon
- Tethered balloon
- Thermal airship
- Virgin Balloon Flights
- Zeppelin

== Notes ==
	Aerostat	Aerodyne		
	Lift: Lighter than air gas	Lift: Fixed wing	Lift: Unpowered rotor	Lift: Powered rotor
Unpowered free flight	(Free) balloon	Glider	Helicopter, etc. in autorotation	(None – see note 2)
Tethered (static or towed)	Tethered balloon	Kite	Rotor kite	(None – see note 2)
Powered	Airship	Airplane, ornithopter, etc.	Autogyro	Gyrodyne, helicopter
