= Alexander Dahl =

Alexander Dahl (29 November 1892 – 15 December 1978) was a German industrialist, author and balloonist. He is known for his pioneering balloon flights, he made 107 different ascents throughout his life, especially his 1933 high altitude balloon attempt.

== Life ==
Alexander Dahl was born on 29 November 1892, in Barmen, today a part of Wuppertal. Dahl was a reserve lieutenant World War I, where he received training as a free and tethered balloon observer and officer. After the war ended, he became a senior leader at his fathers leather factory, which he took over in 1934. His chief interest remained aviation however, with a particular interest in radio and balloons. From 1941–1945 he took part in the Second World War, once again in the reserve, this time as a major in the Luftwaffe. He was stationed in Dresden as part of Luftgau IV, an aerial reconnaissance group where he was able to contribute to the development of numerous radio related technologies. After the war, he continued work at the factory until its closure in 1958. From this point on he was a consultant at the German Association for Positioning and Navigation until his retirement in 1965. He died in Wuppertal on 15 December 1978.

== 1933 balloon flight ==
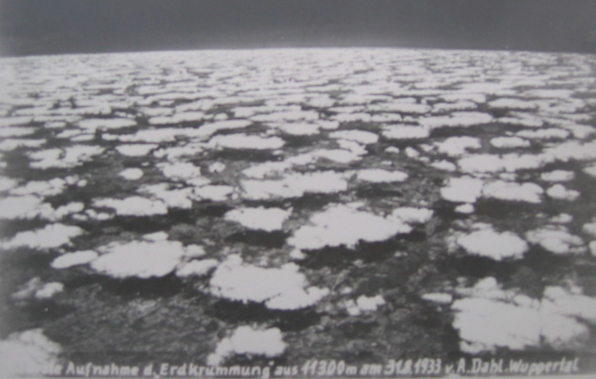
Dahl's alleged picture of the Earth's curvature probably mostly shows barrel distortion of the lens.

The first image showing the Earth's curvature allegedly was taken at a height of 11,300 metres (37,100 ft) on 31 August 1933 from the high performance (9.800 cbm) hydrogen gas balloon Bartsch von Sigsfeld. The official purpose of the flight was not to gain maximum height, but rather to measure the effect of sun radiation within the tropopause. However, as part of the flight, the crew also set the first height record for unaided altitude flight in an open air balloon.

== Writings ==
- Alexander Dahl: Bumerang, Ein Beitrag zum Hochfrequenzkrieg, Wehrwissenschaftliche Berichte, Volume 13, J.F.Lehmanns Verlag, 1973 ISBN 3-469-00465-X.
- Mj. d. R. Dahl: Deutsche Gegenmaßnahmen gegen fdl. Funk-Navigation 1942–45, AFO Sonderbücherei, Nr. 1029, 1960.
- Alexander Dahl: Im offenen Freiballonkorb in die Stratosphäre, Starten und Fliegen, Volume 5, Dt. Verlags-Anstalt Stuttgart.
- Alexander Dahl: Radartechnik seit mehr als 60 Jahren, Verlag DGON, Heft II/1964.
