= Coye =

Coye is both a given name and a surname.

Notable people with the given name include:

- Coye Dunn (1916–2000), American football player
- Coye Francies (born 1986), American football player

Notable people with the surname include:

- Jean-Baptiste Coye (1711–1771), French provençal writer
- Jose Coye (born 1942), Belizean politician
- Kevin Coye (born 1976), American soccer player
- Lee Brown Coye (1907–1981), American artist
- Warren Coye (born 1965), Belizean cyclist
