= Mercedes Corominas =

Spanish aviator and balloonist

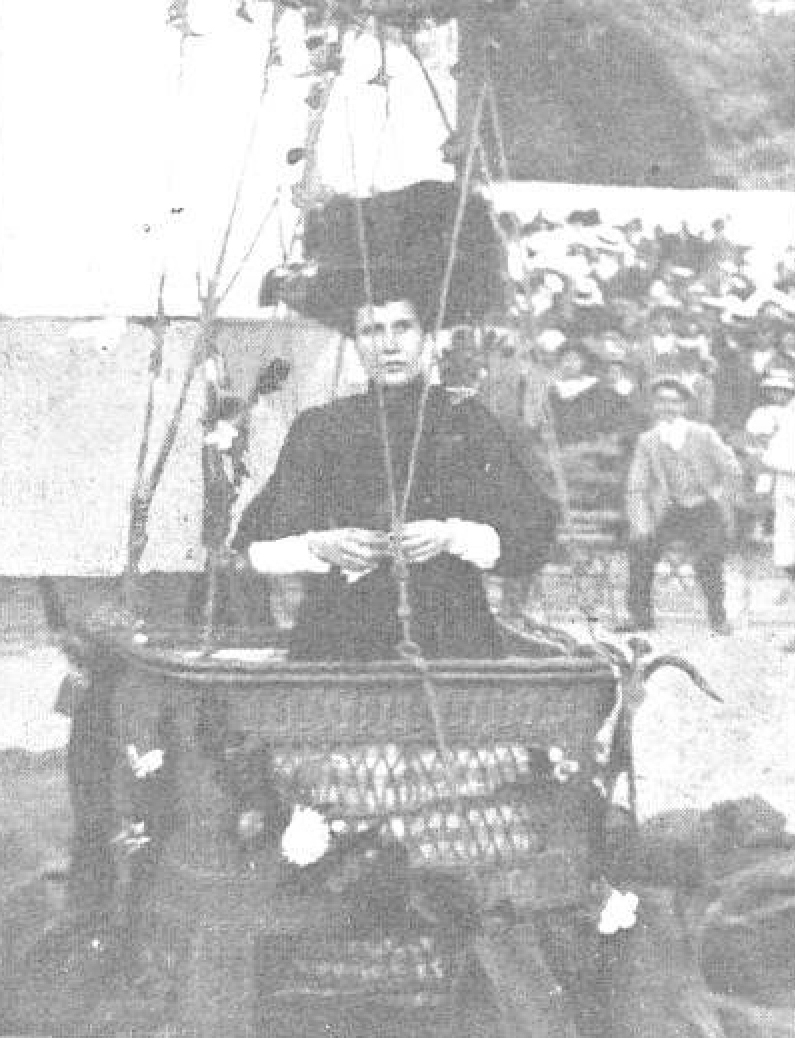
- Born: 1886; Spain
- Died: 1926 (aged 39–40); Brazil
- Occupations: Balloonist, aviator, exhibitionist

Mercedes Corominas was a Spanish aviator and balloonist. Best known for her exhibitions in Portugal, she was one of the first female Spanish aviators.

== Biography ==
Corominas was born in Spain in 1886. She trained as a circus acrobat, and by the turn of the 20th century was participating in the Circo Calderón in Spain. In 1904, she performed a solo aerial ascent in Barcelona, making her the first Spanish woman to make a solo ascent in a balloon. In 1906 she began performing aerial stunts, suspending herself on a trapeze hung underneath a hot air balloon. Her first series of exhibitions, titled "Aerostatic Ascensions", took place in Portugal; these were a major success, and Corominas performed aerial stunts in several Portuguese cities. She would go on to perform her stunts in other parts of Europe.

She married a Portuguese circus performer, Francisco Pedro Monteiro, in 1911. That same year, Corominas performed stunts in Brazil. While in the country, the couple decided to settle down, eventually going on to establish a circus company.
