= Louise Poitevin =

French balloonist (c. 1820–1908)

Louise Rosalie Poitevin (c. 1820–1908) was a French pioneer of aviation, known for being the first woman to carry horses aloft using her gas-filled balloons. She was the second woman to fly by balloon over Portugal.

== Biography ==
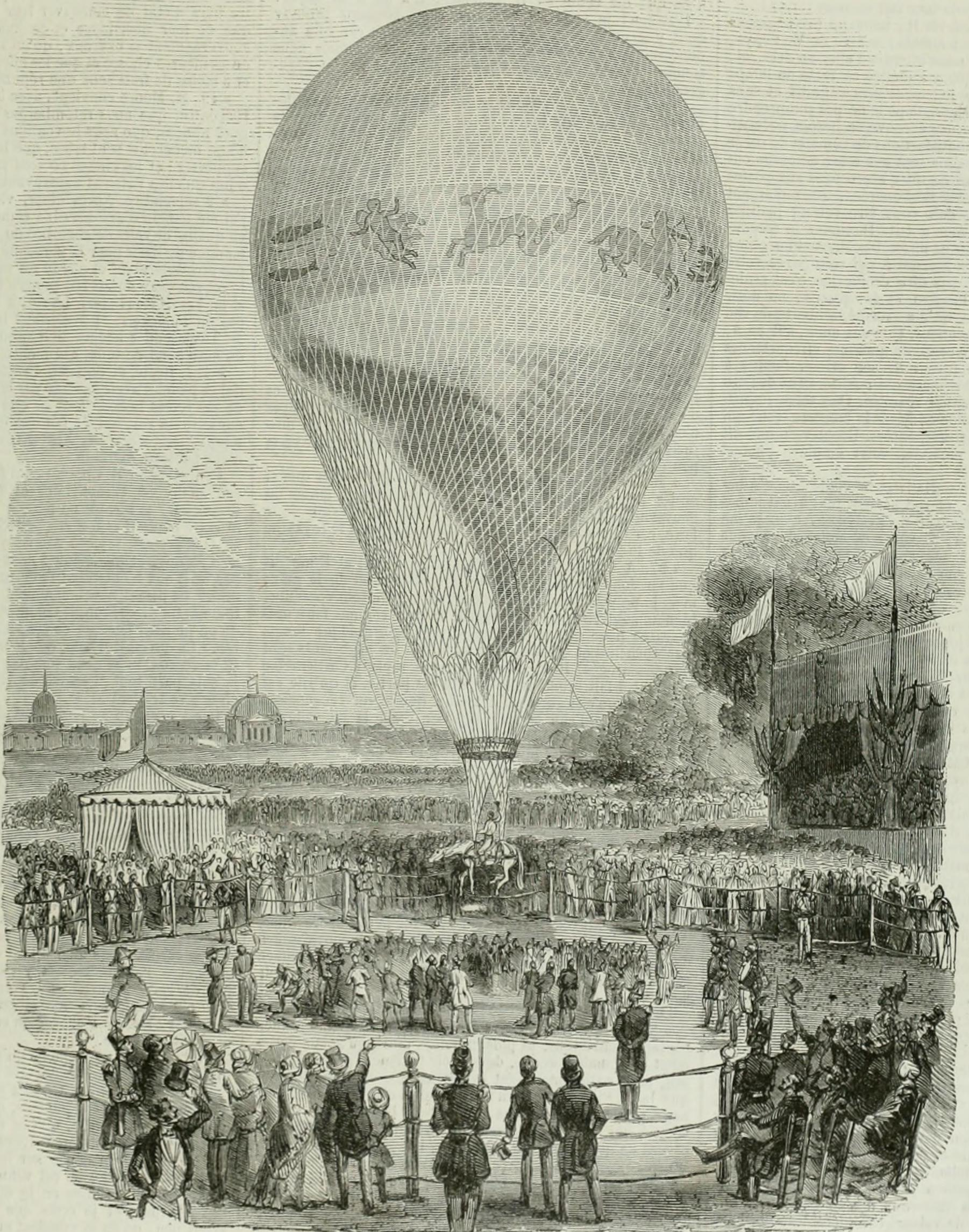
Poitevin and her hot air balloon in Paris

Louise was born on 7 June 1819 in Paris and died on 3 April 1908 in Meudon, France.

On 12 September 1847, she took flight in a balloon with a man named Rossi in Geneva, Switzerland, from the Coulouvrenière district, and they remained in flight for two hours.

In 1850, according to Pionnaire, the latest trend in ballooning was to attach a horse, with a rider in the saddle, beneath a balloon and lift the horse with rider into the air. These equestrian ascents became the specialty of Louise and her husband, Jean Eugène Poitevin. On one occasion in Geneva, her husband piloted the gondola into the air, bringing with him a guest. His wife was sitting astride a pony suspended, dangling, underneath the basket/gondola. Then the balloon took flight. According to the guest, the French showman, Charles Lafontaine:

I ask the intrepid Madame Poitevin how she feels on her horse. 'Very well,' she replies, 'though that is a question you ought to be asking yourself.' 'Oh! But I couldn't be happier with what I see.' Soon after, her voice was heard:' My friend, I would like to mount.' 'Very well, very well,' replied her husband calmly, continuing to arrange the ropes. Madame Poitevin repeated her request, adding, 'I'm getting tired.' Then her husband said to her, 'You may now.' The courageous equestrienne rose to her feet on her horse, took the front of her riding habit and put it between her teeth, then, without letting go of her whip, calmly climbed the rope ladder: her head appeared at the hole in our floor; I offered to help her, but she replied, 'There is no need.' Then she was near us, sitting down.

To keep audiences entertained, the couple would increase the number of horses suspended beneath their gas balloon, and once they even lifted a full-sized carriage into the air. Beginning in 1852, they staged several such demonstrations in Geneva.

Ten years later, in Portugal, during the summer of 1857, Louise and her husband carried out a series of balloon flights, two in Porto, four in Lisbon, and two in Coimbra. She was the second woman to fly over Portugal, the first being Bertrande Senges.

By 1867, Louise Poitevin was a widow, but that did not stop her equestrian ascents. She continued to pilot gas balloons carrying animals on her own.

Madame Poitevin ended her career in 1894 at the age of 55, by landing on horseback on a rooftop in Copenhagen, Denmark.

== Further reading (in French) ==
- "Diverses ascensions genevoises en ballons". Pionnair-GE (in French). 2005-09-07..
- "À cheval en ballon !". L'Art d'être Centaure•sse (in French). 2017-01-12..
- Bernard Marck, Les Aviatrices : des pionnières aux cosmonautes, L’Archipel, 1993.
- Bernard Marck, Elles ont conquis le ciel: 100 femmes qui ont fait l'histoire de l'aviation, 2009.
